= Dilofo =

Dilofo or Dilofos (Greek meaning two hills), may refer to several places in Greece:

- Dilofos, a village in the Evros regional unit
- Dilofo, Ioannina, a village in the Ioannina regional unit, in the municipal unit Central Zagori
- Dilofo, Kozani, a village in the Kozani regional unit
- Dilofo, Larissa, a village in the Larissa regional unit, in the municipal unit Nikaia
- Dilofos, Serres, a former village in the Serres regional unit
