= Vikos =

Vikos may refer to:

- Vikos, Ioannina, village in the Central Zagori municipal unit in Ioannina regional unit, Greece
- Vikos Gorge, gorge in the Pindus Mountains of north-western Greece
- Vikos doctors, folk healers or practical medical practitioners from the Greek area of Zagori
- Vikos–Aoös National Park, national park in the region of Epirus in northwestern Greece
- Vikos-Aoos Geopark, national park in mainland Greece
