= Koinon of the Zagorisians =

Coordinates: 39°54′N 20°49′E

Koinon of the Zagorisians Κοινόν τῶν Ζαγορισίων
- Flag of the Spachides
- Interactive map of Koinon of the Zagorisians
- Capital: Tsepelovo
- Common languages: Greek
- Religion: Greek Orthodox Church
- Government: Autonomous region

The Koinon of the Zagorisians (Greek: Κοινόν τῶν Ζαγορισίων), alternatively Commons of the Zagorisians, League of the Zagorisians, League of Zagori, or Nohaye Zagor in Turkish, was an autonomous region of the Ottoman Empire.

Koinon means "Common", it could be attributed with commonwealth, commune or collective but these terms have associated connotations because of already established usage. The Koinon was a form of government that had existed in various periods in Greek history. In Epirus itself there had in ancient times existed the Koinon of the Molossians. There was a Koinon of Laconians, centred on Sparta and its old dominions for a period under Roman rule, a Koinon of the Macedonians, also under Roman rule. In modern Greek history, during the Greek War of Independence, a local self-government termed Koinon was set up in the islands of Hydra, Spetsai and Psara.

== History ==
In the 1420s, Epirus was a Byzantine dominion. In 1430-1431, Sinan Pasha, a general of Sultan Murad II, led an army into Epirus and fought a series of battles that led to its eventual conquest. Fourteen villages of central Zagori reached a very favourable agreement with Sinan Pasha, following one such battle (near Votsa), that the Turks would guarantee certain privileges for the region of Zagori in return for vassalage. These privileges included an autonomous government headed by a Head Prelate called Vekylis (Greek: Βεκύλης) (elected every 6 months or every year) and a Council of Elders (Greek: Δημογεροντία). The Elders were representing each village and were elected locally. The Zagorisians would not pay taxes to the Ottomans but an obligation was agreed upon to maintain a number of attendants to the Sultan's stables. The Zagorisians maintained a small armed force of Sipahi cavalry (Σπαχῆδες). Fifty years later, the villages of Eastern Zagori also joined the Treaty.

This agreement, called "Voiniko" was modified in 1670. The Koinon of the Zagorisians was set up and further privileges called "Siouroutia" were established, thanks to the influence of Phanariots of Zagorisian descent. These included the replacement of the obligation to send attendants to the Sultan's stables with a tax, the free exercise of the Christian faith and significantly a prohibition of entry of Turks into Zagori. The villages of Western Zagori entered the Koinon of the Zagorisians in 1750.

From 1750, the Vekylis of Zagori took up residence in Ioannina, in a House of the Koinon of the Zagorisians or in private. He was responsible for the collection of taxes and for judging civil law disputes.

During the Ottoman period Zagori was one of three Greek regions that enjoyed autonomy under a treaty, the other two were Mani in the Peloponnese and Mademochoria in Macedonia.
