= Dilofo, Ioannina =

Greek village

Dilofo Δίλοφο
- Community
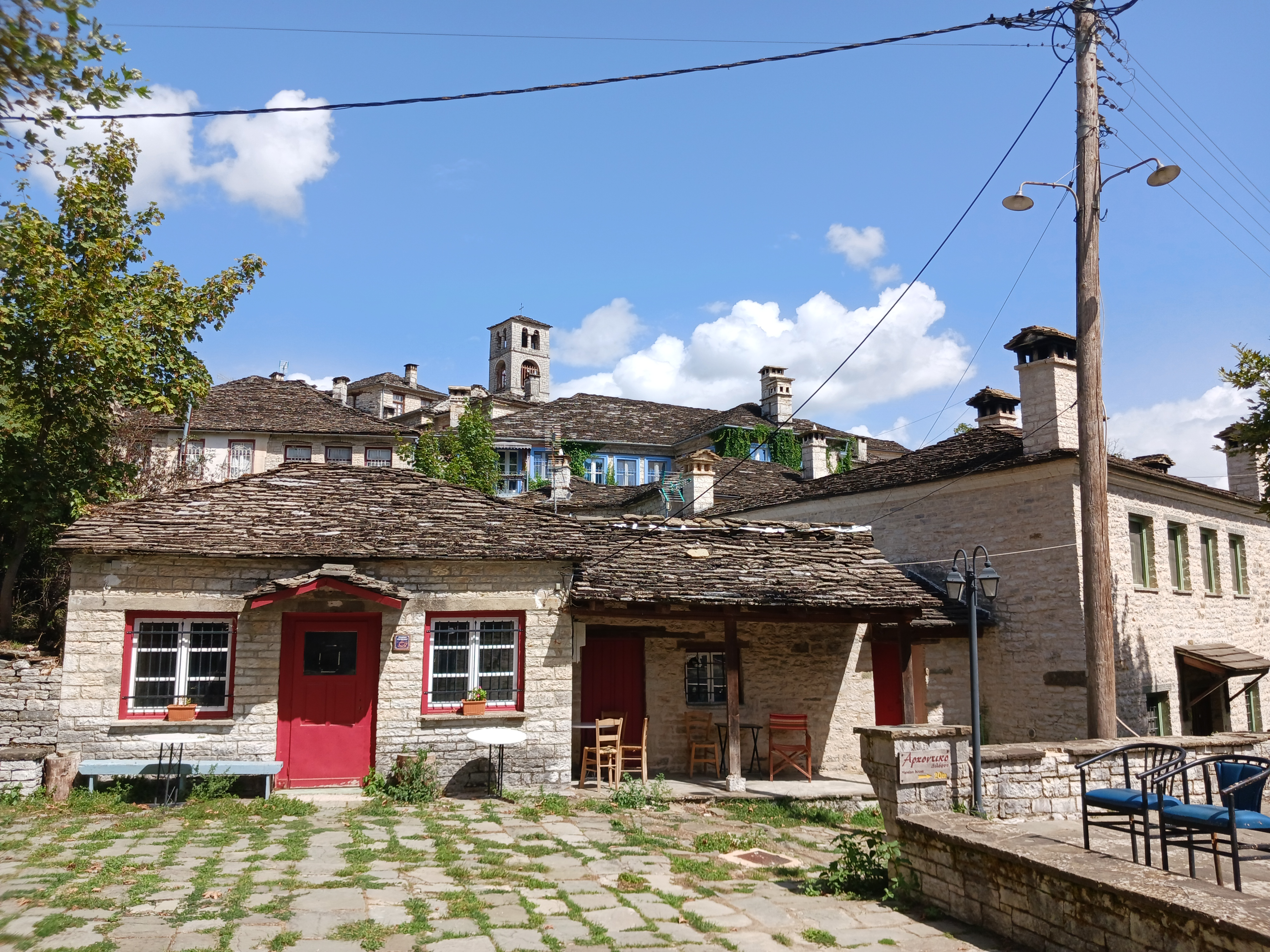
- Dilofo

- Location within Greece
- Coordinates: 39°51′6.8″N 20°45′51.8″E
- Country: Greece
- Administrative region: Epirus
- Regional unit: Ioannina
- Municipality: Zagori
- Municipal unit: Central Zagori

Population (2021)
  - Community: 13
- Time zone: UTC+2 (EET)
  - Summer (DST): UTC+3 (EEST)

Dilofo (Greek: Δίλοφο, before 1927: Σωποτσέλιον, Sopotselion, between 1927 and 1928: Αμπελιές, Ampelies) is a village in the Ioannina Regional Unit in Epirus, northwestern Greece.

== Name ==
The placename Sopotseli stems from the Aromanian noun șoput, meaning 'pipe from which the water of a spring is poured, tap, fountain', and is derived from the Slavic word sopotъ, 'pipe, water flowing with noise, spring, waterfall'. The diminutive suffix is from the Aromanian (and Romanian) -el, from Latin -ellum. The toponym underwent inflection where the t and e (or i) became ț and e (or i). The linguist Max Vasmer derived the toponym from the Slavic words sopotъ and selo, while the linguist Kostas Oikonomou stated the etymology is less likely for the placename.

== History ==
Dilofo is one of the 46 historic villages of Zagori, known in Greek as the Zagorochoria (Greek: Ζαγοροχώρια). It is situated at an altitude of 1,000 meters on the slopes of Mount Tymfi.

In 1870, the village had 550 inhabitants and a large school. It became part of Greece in 1913 following the First Balkan War. In 1940 it had 140 inhabitants.

== Demographics ==
The village is inhabited by Greeks, and an Aromanian community which has assimilated into the local population.

== Culture ==
Dilofo is one of the best preserved villages in Zagori. It is a typical example of Zagori architecture and has been declared a traditional settlement. The multistory school was founded in 1855 when Dilofo had around 550 inhabitants. It is now used as a cultural center.

Other attractions include stone fountains, cobblestone roads, small churches and several mansions. Among them is the 13.5 meter high Makropoulos mansion, which is the tallest residence in Zagori. According to tradition, the son of a wealthy local resident married a girl from the neighboring village of Koukouli. When they settled in the groom's house in Dilofo, the bride expressed a sad nostalgia for her village. As a result, the husband built the towering mansion so that his wife could see her village from its highest floors.
