= Vikos, Ioannina =

Greek village

Vikos Βίκος
- Settlement
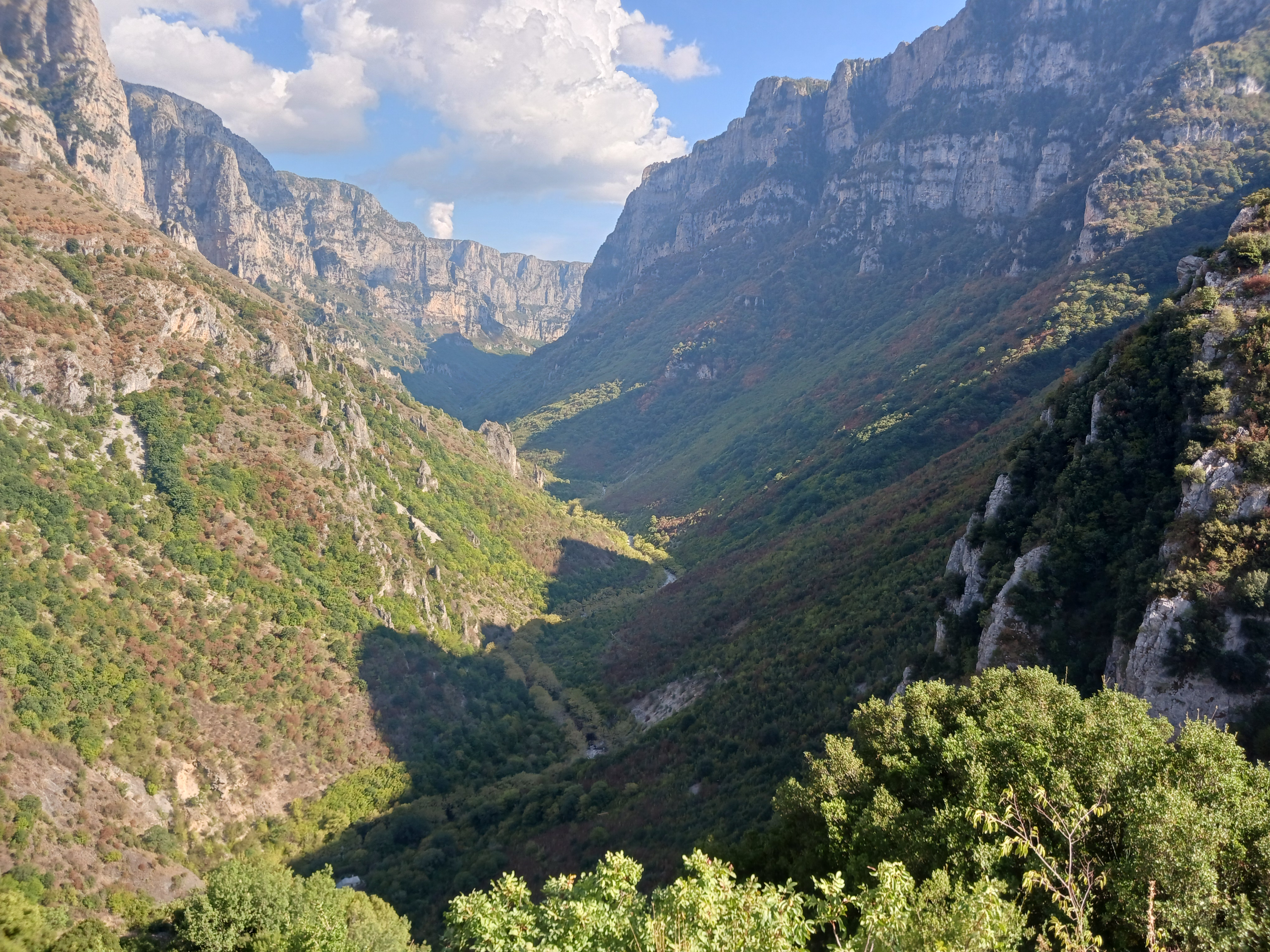
- View of the Vikos Gorge from the village of Vikos

- Location within Greece
- Coordinates: 39°58′N 20°44′E
- Country: Greece
- Administrative region: Epirus
- Regional unit: Ioannina
- Municipality: Zagori
- Municipal unit: Central Zagori
- Community: Aristi

Population (2021)
  - Total: 27
- Time zone: UTC+2 (EET)
  - Summer (DST): UTC+3 (EEST)

Vikos (Greek: Βίκος, before 1955: Βετσικόν, Vetsikon) is a village in the municipality of Zagori, in the Ioannina regional unit, Epirus, Greece. It is part of the community of Aristi. The village is located on a hill above the Vikos Gorge and the Voidomatis river has its main sources below the settlement. Vikos borders the Vikos-Aoos National Park.

== Name ==
The toponym has been rendered as Vovetsikon and Vovitsikon. The placename is Slavic and has two possible derivations. The first is from the combination of the Slavic preposition v(o) 'in' and the Slavic noun vysokъ 'high place', rendered in Bulgarian and Serbian as visok and in Russian vysokij. Within the toponym, the s became ts, followed by the anomalous deletion of the initial syllable vo- and the paretymological influence of the Greek adjectival suffix -ikos.

The second derivation is from the Slavic noun bobъ 'bean' and the suffix -isko or -ьsko, with which nouns are formed to indicate a place where something exists. From the phonetic form bobisko emerged bobitsko, where sk became tsk in Bulgarian, a change observed in the 14th century. This evolved into vovitsko with the hellenisation of b-b into v-v in Greek and the anomalous deletion of the syllable vo- and the paretymological influence of the suffix -ikos. The linguist Kostas Oikonomou stated the form Bobetsikon is an incorrect restoration.

== Demographics ==
The village is inhabited by Greeks.

In 1951, the village had 50 inhabitants. In the 2021 census, it recorded 27 inhabitants.
