= Aristi =

Aristi Αρίστη
- Community
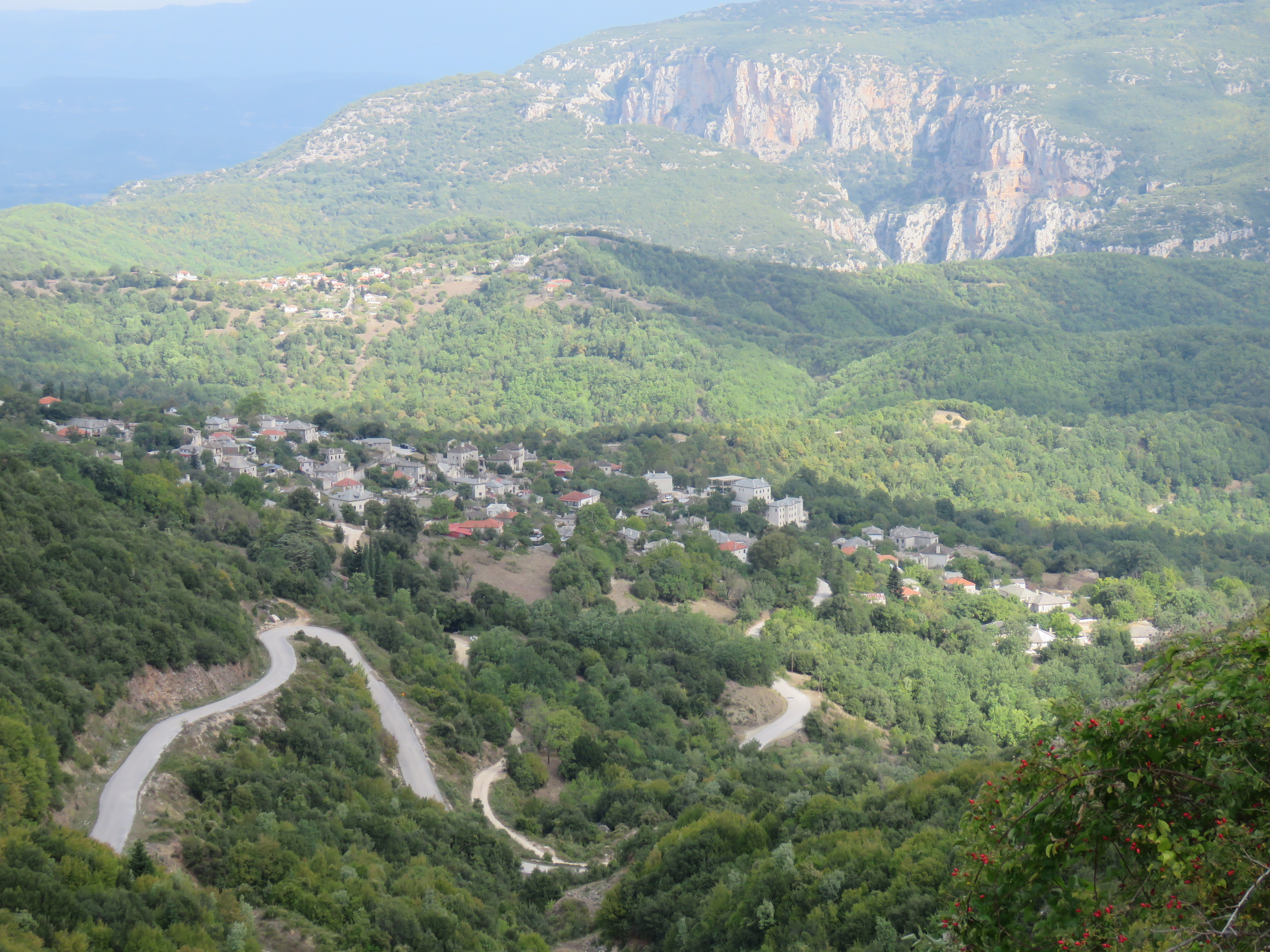
- View of Aristi from the south

- Location within Greece
- Coordinates: 39°56′4.14″N 20°40′19.49″E
- Country: Greece
- Administrative region: Epirus
- Regional unit: Ioannina
- Municipality: Zagori
- Municipal unit: Central Zagori

Population (2021)
  - Community: 115
- Time zone: UTC+2 (EET)
  - Summer (DST): UTC+3 (EEST)

Aristi (Greek: Αρίστη; before 1929: Αρτσίστα, Artsista) is a village in the Ioannina Regional Unit in Epirus, northwestern Greece. The community consists of the villages Aristi and Vikos.

== Name ==
The village is recorded with the form Artzista both in the Chronicle of Ioannina (14th century) and in the book Chronography (1854) by the scholar Panagiotis Aravantinos. Aravantinos described the toponym as Albanian. It is derived from the Albanian phytonym arrç, -i 'buckthorn' and the Slavic-derived Albanian suffix -ishtë (and -ishta in the definite form), which indicates the place where a certain type of grass, bush, or tree grows. In the Zagori region, Albanian toponyms are among the few traces of a late medieval Albanian migration toward central and southern Greece.

== History ==
Aristi is one of the 46 historic villages of Zagori, known in Greek as the Zagorochoria (Greek: Ζαγοροχώρια). During the Ottoman census of 1895, Aristi had 899 inhabitants. During the last years of Ottoman rule, the village had a boys' school with 50 students and a girls' school with 40 students.

The village became part of Greece in 1913, following the First Balkan War. The first Greek census that year recorded a population of 574. In 2021, the village had 115 inhabitants.

== Demographics ==
The village is inhabited by Greeks, and Arvanite families who assimilated into the local population. The arrival of Orthodox Albanians (locally called "Arvanites") occurred in the modern period and originate from the wider Souli area in central Greek Epirus.
