= Manthos Oikonomou =

Manthos Economou (Greek: Μάνθος Οικονόμου; 1754 – 22 August 1820) was a Greek member of the Filiki Eteria, private secretary and advisor of Ali Pasha of Ioannina. He was executed by the Ottoman troops.

== Biographical information ==
Εconomou was born in 1754 in Koukouli of Zagori region. Later, he settled to Ioannina in order to study at city's well-known schools. Due to his skills and personality, he was engaged in Ali’ s court, and soon he managed to become one of his most distinguished and trustworthy advisors. According to a theory, in 1807 he saved from certain death the notable Greek scholar and priest Konstantinos Ekonomos Economon when he was imprisoned in Ioannina.

During the period 1817 to 1819, Economou was involved in negotiations with the British for the purchase of the coastal town of Parga on behalf of Ali Pasha. Furthermore, he tried to dissuade the residents of Parga (whom by fearing Ali Pasha, they decided to abandon their homes and seek refuge in the Ionian Islands) or at least to achieve the reduction of the number of the refugees in order to reduce the amount of the compensation that Pasha had to pay.

In order to achieve this, allegedly he attempted to bribe without success, the police authorities of the town. The same year he was initiated into the Filiki Eteria by his brother Christodoulos and then he was the one that initiated the interpreter and advisor of Ali Pasha, Spyros Kolovos. During the war of Ali Pasha with the Sublime Porte, Ekonomou played a key role in the defection of significant chieftains of Ali, such as Omer Vrioni, Tahir Abaz, Ago Vasiarj etc., to the sultan troops. According to Lambros Koutsonikas, an agreement existed between Economou and the two pashas (Ismail Pasha and Mahmud Dramali) who were marching against Ioannina.

Fearing that any revealing of his actions would lead to his certain death, Economou defected and fled to Metsovo where he intended to meet with an old acquaintance of Ismail Pasha in order to offer him his services. However, he was captured by the vanguard of Dramali and after interrogation, he was executed in August 1820, being probably a victim of the personal rivalry between Ismail and Dramali.

== Posthumous fame ==
Manthos Economou is presented positively by a portion of - Epirotes mainly - historians and writers: according to Ioannis Lambridis, Economou was a benefactor of Zagori because he took care of the preservation of the privileges that this region enjoyed while Spiridon Aravantinos argues that the action of Economou benefited his fellow citizens and helped the work of the Filiki Eteria. Also, Dimitrios Kampouroglou had a positive view about Economou in the section that he edited in Modern Encyclopedia Eleftheroudaki (Σύγχρονος Εγκυκλοπαίδεια Ελευθερουδάκη) for Economou.

On the opposite, Trifonas Evaggelidis mentions him as wrangler and one of the "abhorrently enforcers” of Ali Pasha while a similar negative position is reflected in Moustoxidis and Duval’s reference.

== Bibliography ==
- Amaury Duval – Andreas Moustoxidis, Έκθεσις των γεγονότων όσα συνέβησαν πριν και μετά την παραχώρησιν της Πάργας - Σύγγραμμα εκδοθέν εν Παρισίοις γαλλιστί κατά το 1820 έτος Νυν δε μεταφρασθέν υπό Ιωάννου Βερβιτσιώτου, Τυπογραφείον Ερμής Χ. Νικολαΐδου Φιλαδελφέως, Corfu, 1851.
- Trifonas E. Evaggelidis, Ιστορία Αλή πασά του Τεπελενλή Σατράπου της Ηπείρου ( 1741 - 1822 ), Εκδοτικόν Κατάστημα Π. Ζανουδάκη, Athens, 1896.
- Ioannis Filimonas, Δοκίμιον ιστορικόν περί της ελληνικής Επαναστάσεως, vol. 1, 1859.
- Lampros Koutsonikas, Γενική ιστορία της Ελληνικής Επαναστάσεως, Τύποις του "Ευαγγελισμού" Δ. Καρακατζάνη, Athens, 1863.
- Ioannis Lampridis, Ζαγοριακά οις προσετέθησαν και τινά περί Ηπείρου, Εκ του Τυπογραφείου της Αυγής, Athens, 1870.
