= Koukouli, Ioannina =

Koukouli Κουκούλι
- Community
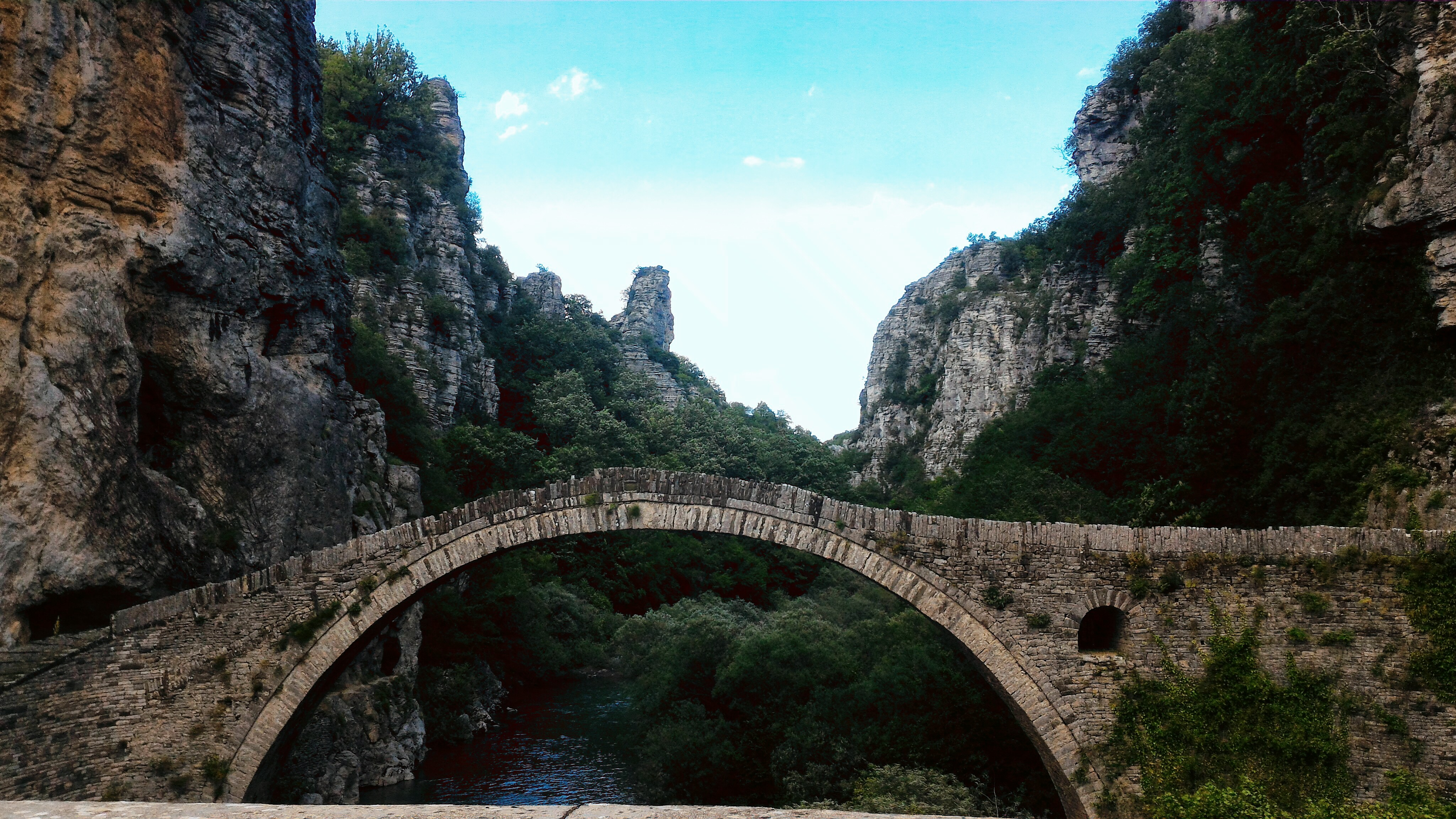
- Kokorou Bridge, Koukouli

- Location within Greece
- Coordinates: 39°52.3′N 20°46.5′E
- Country: Greece
- Administrative region: Epirus
- Regional unit: Ioannina
- Municipality: Zagori
- Municipal unit: Tymfi

Population (2021)
  - Community: 67
- Time zone: UTC+2 (EET)
  - Summer (DST): UTC+3 (EEST)
- Vehicle registration: ΙΝ

Koukouli (Greek: Κουκούλι) is a village of the Zagori region, in the municipal unit of Tymfi, in northwestern Greece. The village is situated at the southern end of the Vikos Gorge.

== Name ==
Historian J. R. McNeill (1992) states the village takes its name from the Greek word of silkworm cocoon; silk production in the wider region of Zagori was popular during the past centuries.

The linguist Kostas Oikonomou (2002) stated the toponym stemmed from the Greek noun koukouli. In the Zagori region, this term means 'rock, stone', a word formed from the diminutive noun koukoulia, meaning 'skull cap, conical or spherical crown', derived from the Latin cuculla. In Aromanian, the word cucul'ĭŭ has various meanings, including 'tassle, peak, hood, bumblebee'. As a Greek surname, it is rendered as Koukoulis or Koukoulas; while Koukouli as a toponym in the Katsanohoria region of the Ioannina regional unit means 'place where there is a large stone'.

== History ==
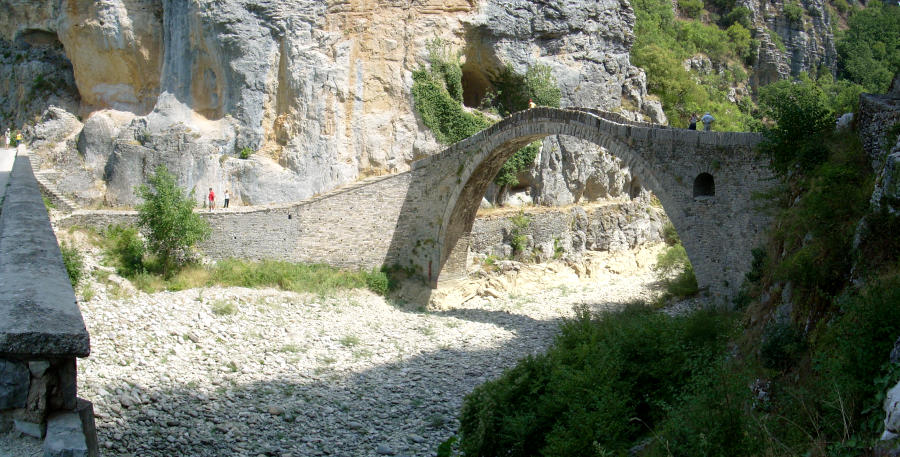
Kokorou bridge, between Koukouli and Kipoi.

The village appears to be founded somewhere in the 13th century. It was included in the treaty signed between the villages of Zagori (there were 14 at the time) and the Ottomans at 1430, which marked the beginning of Ottoman rule in the region. The villages of Zagori formed an autonomous federation for the next centuries. The privileges which were granted to the federation of Zagori and which are due, in the biggest part, to the influence of notable Zagorians over the Sublime Porte, were preserved until 1868. According to these privileges, Zagori was autonomous and self-governed under the surveillance of the Vekili of Zagori.

Many inhabitants during the 18th century became merchants, traveled abroad and made huge profits. The Plakidas family was one of those that made a fortune. Alexios Plakidas, a local benefactor, donated huge amounts of money for the village and the Zagori region.

Prior to the Second World War, Koukoulians used to migrate to Asia Minor and the United States. Inside Greece, they mostly migrated to Macedonia.

Today, like the rest of Zagori, the village is a tourist destination, mainly in winter season. Buildings of traditional architecture such as the 2 schools and the historical Inn, serve as hotels for the tourists.

== Demographics ==
The village is inhabited by Greeks, and some Sarakatsani who settled in the village during the early 20th century. The Sarakatsani are Greek speakers.

== Notable people ==
- Manthos Iconomou (1754–1822), scholar and advisor of Ali Pasha.
- Alexios Plakidas, merchant and benefactor.
- Konstantinos Lazaridis, scholar and botanologist, founder of the natural museum of Koukouli.
- Lefteris Zagoritis, former member of the Greek parliament.
- Demetrios Stroubos (1806 - 1890), professor.
