= Asprangeloi =

Asprangeloi Ασπράγγελοι
- Community
- Location within Greece
- Coordinates: 39°49′24″N 20°43′43″E
- Country: Greece
- Administrative region: Epirus
- Regional unit: Ioannina
- Municipality: Zagori
- Municipal unit: Central Zagori

Population (2021)
  - Community: 159
- Time zone: UTC+2 (EET)
  - Summer (DST): UTC+3 (EEST)

Asprangeloi (Greek: Ασπράγγελοι, before 1927: Δοβρά, Dovra) is a village in the Ioannina Regional Unit in Epirus, northwestern Greece. It is the seat of the Zagori Municipality.

== Name ==
The toponym is derived from the feminine Slavic adjective dobъ, -bra, -bro, meaning 'good'; the placename emerged after the associated noun was dropped.

== History ==
Local tradition states the village was created by the migration of inhabitants from the now deserted village of Kosartsiko (or Dovra) in the Konitsa region.

Asprangeloi (also spelled Aspraggeloi, Aspraggeli or Asprangeli in English) is a mountain village in the Ioannina Regional Unit, built at an altitude of 989 meters, on the slopes of Mt Mitsikeli. It is the seat of the Municipality of Zagori and its permanent population, according to the 2021 Census, is 159 inhabitants. Until 1927, it was called Dovra (Greek: Δοβρά) or Ntovra (Greek: Ντοβρά). The name "Asprangeloi" was taken from the Asprangeloi Monastery which exists in the area.

The first mention of the settlement is found in 1380 and it experienced development during the 16th and 17th centuries. During the 19th century, it was a large and economically prosperous village. The village was burned by the Nazis on 15 July 1943.

=== Churches and monasteries ===
The stone church of Panagia was built in 1915. In the village is the church of Agios Nikolaos, built in 1776. The old monastery (Moni Dovras), dating from 1600, is also preserved in the village.

== Demographics ==
The village is inhabited by Greeks, Arvanite families who assimilated into the local population and some Sarakatsani who settled in the village during the early 20th century. The arrival of Orthodox Albanians (locally called "Arvanites") occurred in the modern period and originate from the wider Souli area in central Greek Epirus, while the Sarakatsani are Greek speakers.
