= Zagori =

Region in Epirus, Greece

Zagori Greek: Ζαγόρι Aromanian: Zagori
- Municipality
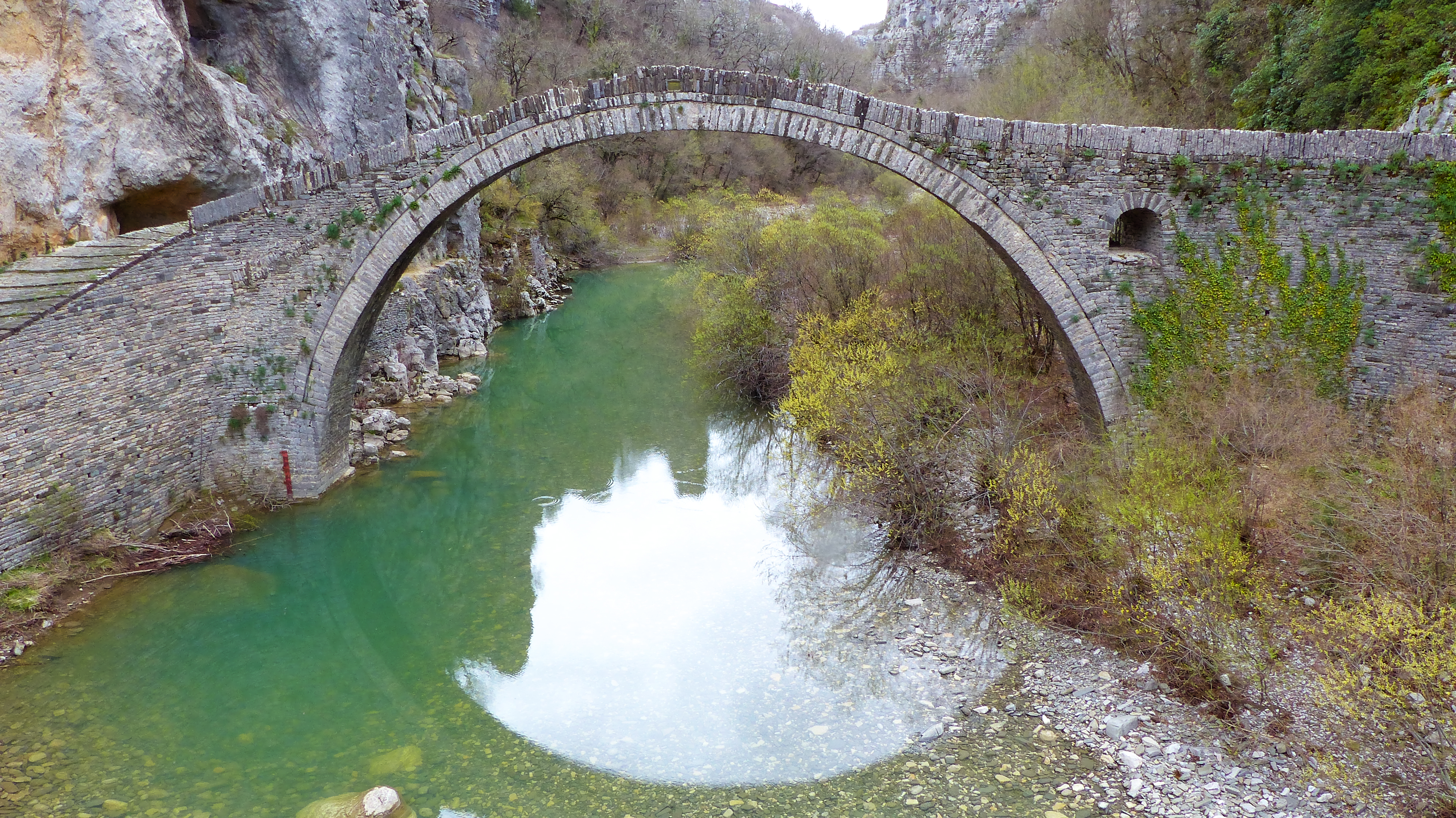
- Kokori's bridge in Vikos-Aoos National Park

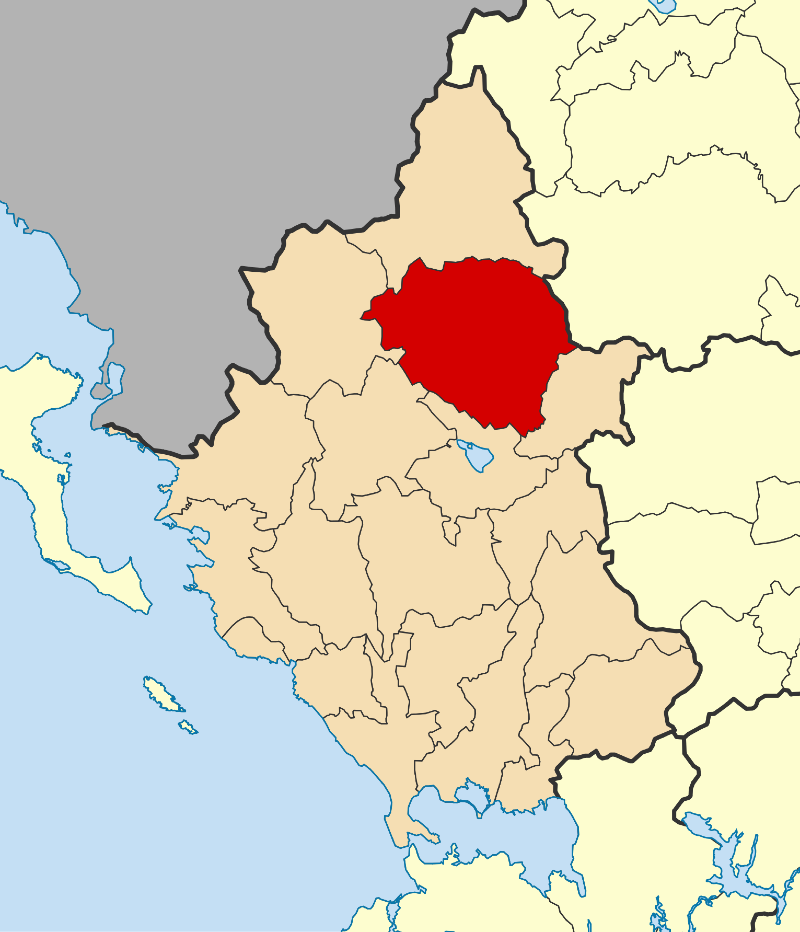

- Location within Greece
- Coordinates: 39°52′N 20°42′E
- Country: Greece
- Administrative region: Epirus
- Regional unit: Ioannina
- Seat: Asprangeloi

Area
  - Municipality: 989.8 km^{2} (382.2 sq mi)

Population (2021)
  - Municipality: 3,374
  - Density: 3.409/km^{2} (8.829/sq mi)
- Time zone: UTC+2 (EET)
  - Summer (DST): UTC+3 (EEST)
- Vehicle registration: ΙΝ

UNESCO World Heritage Site
- Official name: Zagori Cultural Landscape
- Type: Cultural
- Criteria: v
- Designated: 2023 (45th session)
- Reference no.: 1695
- UNESCO region: Europe

Zagori (Greek: Ζαγόρι; Aromanian: Zagori) is a region, a municipality, and a designated UNESCO World Heritage Site, in the Pindus mountains in Epirus, in northwestern Greece. The seat of the municipality is the village Asprangeloi. It has an area of some 1,000 square kilometres (390 mi^{2}) and contains 46 villages known as Zagori villages (or Zagorochoria or Zagorohoria), and is in the shape of an upturned equilateral triangle.

Ioannina, the capital of the administrative region of that name, borders the southern point of the triangle, while the southwestern side is formed by Mount Mitsikeli (1,810m). The Aoos river running north of Mount Tymphe forms the northern boundary, while the southeastern side runs along the Varda river to Mount Mavrovouni (2,100m) near Metsovo. The municipality has an area of 989.796 km^{2}. The population of the area is about 3,400, which gives a population density of 3.4 inhabitants per square kilometer, very sparse when compared to an average of 73.8 for Greece as a whole.

== Geography ==
Zagori is an area of great natural beauty, with striking geology and two National Parks, one including the river Aoos and the Vikos Gorge, the other around Valia Kalda, to the east of the imposing snow-capped Mt Tymphe. The 46 or so villages of Zagori were interconnected by mountain roads and traditional arched stone bridges until modern roads were opened in the 1950s. The stone arched bridges were built by benefactions from expatriate merchants in the 18th century and replaced older wooden bridges.

== History ==
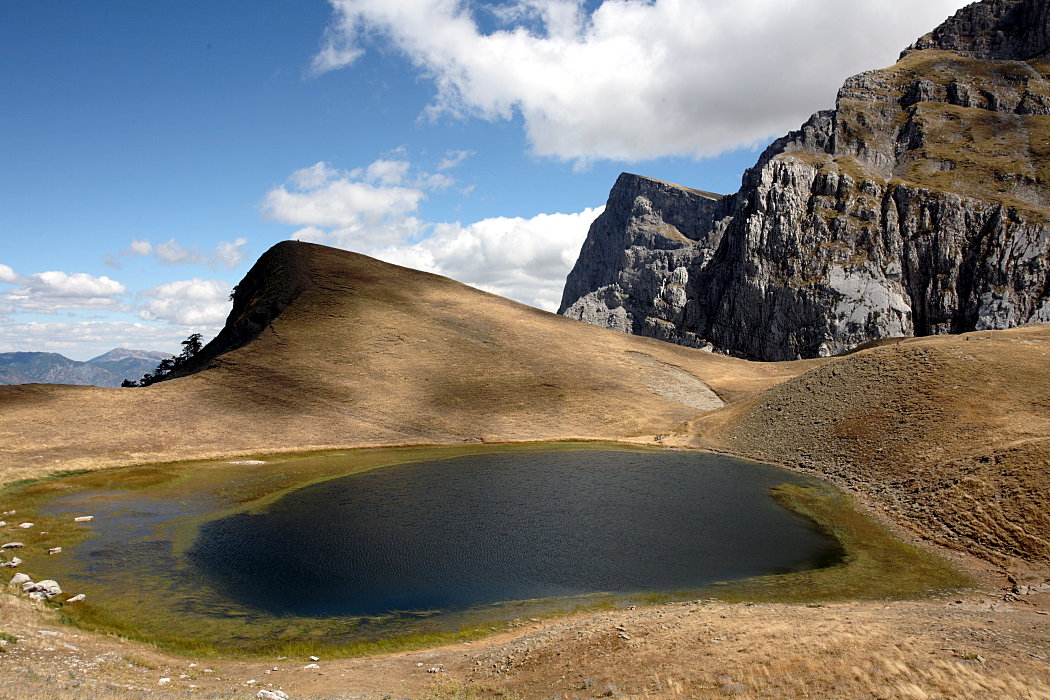
Dragonlake and Gamila summit (2497 m.)

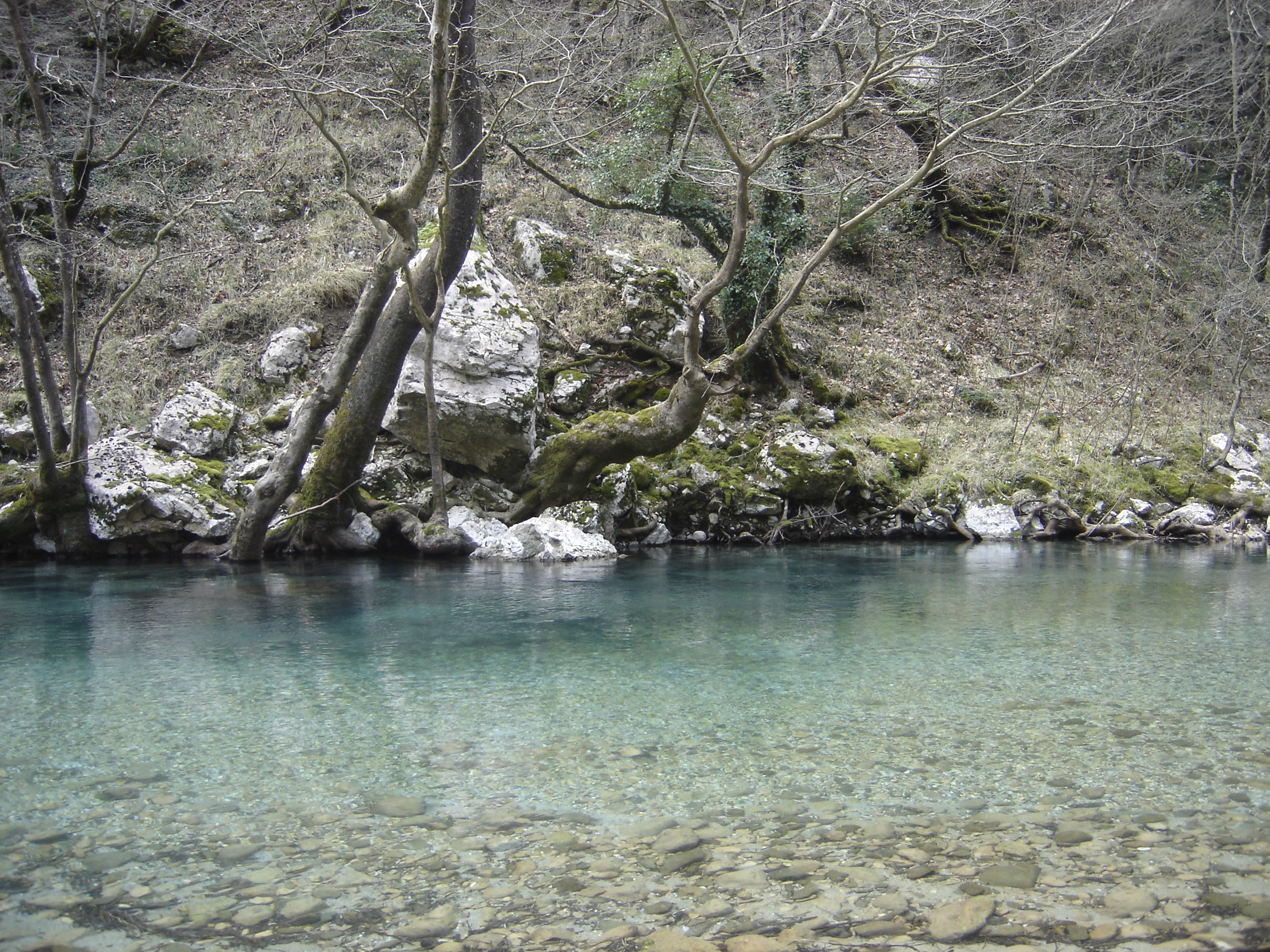
Voidomatis river, Vikos-Aoos National Park

The region has been historically difficult to access due to its mountainous terrain which likely contributed to its unique character. The Sarakatsani people who can be found in this area use several Greek words of a Northern Greek dialect not commonly found in Greek elsewhere. They are consequently considered by some as indigenous to the area.

=== Early history ===
The first evidence of human presence in the area is dated between 17,000 and 10,000 years ago. Important epipaleolithic artifacts have been unearthed from Kleidi Cave on the banks of Voidomatis. In antiquity, the region of Zagori was inhabited by the Tymphaeans and formed a part of the ancient kingdom of the Molossians, a Greek tribe of Epirus that gained control over all of Epirus in classical times. The Molossian royal house ruled Epirus from the ancient town of "Molossis" which was located near modern Konitsa, in the northern boundary of Zagori, where the rivers Voidomatis, Aoös and Sarantaporos come together. The Molossians were known among else for a breed of great mastiffs they used to guard their flocks from wolves and bears and which were even used in war.

Molossus, their eponymous ancestor, was said to have been born of a union between Neoptolemus (son of Achilles ) and Andromache (the wife of Hector of Troy). Neoptolemus, also called Pyrrhus for his blond hair, was first in a line of Epirotan kings leading to the king Pyrrhus of Hellenistic times who launched several campaigns against the Romans in Italy. Olympias, the mother of Alexander the Great, was a Molossian princess. Remains of cyclopean walls in Skamneli also testify to the antiquity of human occupation. During the 9th–4th centuries BC, a small Molossian settlement existed between Monodendri and Vitsa, including stone houses and two cemeteries which have yielded important findings. Additionally, foundations of fortifications and graves from the Hellenistic period have been found in Skamneli. However, throughout most of the historical time the local population was sparse.

=== Byzantine period ===
The Despotate of Epirus (in green) from 1230 to 1251

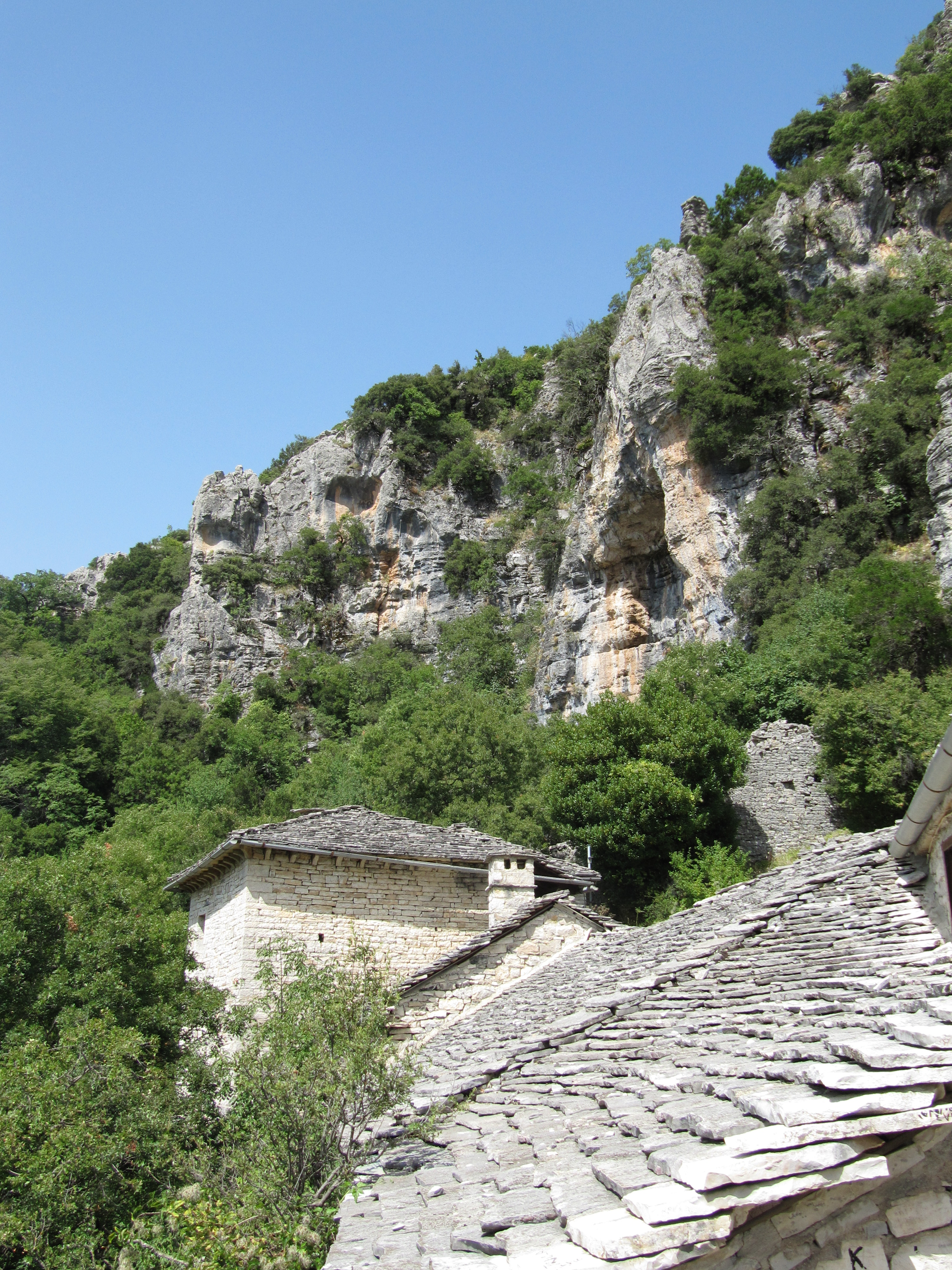
Monastery of Saint Paraskevi

The passage of the Slavs during the early Byzantine period is testified to by numerous placenames. The placename "Zagori" itself is probably derived from the Slavic Zagore meaning "beyond the mountains". Under the Byzantine Empire, Zagori occasionally attracted groups of soldiers who built villages and settled there. Several monasteries were royal endowments, including the monastery of Votsa near the village of Greveniti and the monastery of the Transfiguration near Kleidonia, founded in the 7th century by the Byzantine Emperor Constantine IV Pogonatus and the monastery of St John of Rogovou near Tsepelovo founded in 1028 by the sister of Emperor Romanos III Argyros.

From 1204 to 1337 the region was part of the Despotate of Epirus. In the 14th century, when various Albanian clans made incursions into Epirus, Zagori was the source of soldiers that served in the Ioannina garrison. In turn, as the center of Greek rule, Ioannina shielded Zagori against Albanian attacks. As a result of the campaigns of Andronikos III Paleologos in 1337, the Despotate of Epirus and, therefore, Zagori along with Ioannina and the surrounding region came again briefly under Byzantine rule.

The region came under Serbian rule in 1348 and the Despotate of Epirus was reformed and was under Latin rule by Carlo II Tocco when Ioannina and Zagori fell to the Turks in 1430, at the time of Sultan Murad II. Zagori (which then only consisted of 14 villages) "bowed the knee", which meant in practice that there were obligations between delegations of the two sides and a sum in tax was agreed upon in exchange for very considerable privileges: autonomy, administrative independence, and a ban on Turks crossing the borders into the area.

=== Ottoman period ===
The Zagorisian League or Koinon of the Zagorisians (Κοινόν Ζαγορισίων) was formed after the treaty of 1431 with Sinan-Pasha. At that point the arrangement that granted local autonomy was called "Voiniko". The autonomy guaranteed non-interference in the local affairs by the Ottoman overlords. Zagorisians had their affairs entrusted to a Council of Elders called Demogerontia (Δημογεροντία), headed by a president or governor called Vekylis (Βεκύλης). As part of the treaty they maintained a force of Sipahi cavalry (σπαχήδες), with each village contributing a number of horsemen to that force according to its means. Under the terms of this agreement no intervention by the Ottoman authorities was allowed, nor did any Ottoman armed units had the right to set foot on Zagori. The villages of Eastern Zagori, inhabited by Aromanians, entered the Treaty in 1480.

Many toponyms in northern and eastern Zagori that have Aromanian etymology, while toponyms with mainly Greek or Slavic etymology are present in western and southern Zagori. In a 1986 study of 3546 local toponyms ~70% are mediated via Greek and ~30% via non-Greek languages in their modern form: 13% Aromanian, 8,3% Slavic, 5,2% Albanian and 2,2% Turkish, while in terms of linguistic origin 56% Greek, and about non-Greek (including loanwords that were already incorporated in the local Greek language): 14% Aromanian, 11.5% Slavic, 6% Albanian, 4.8% Turkish, 3.3% of mixed linguistic origin and 2.5% Latin.

The main source of income for the local communities came from commercial activities which resulted in migration to distant places. From 17th century the economy of Zagori primarily depended on the remittances and bequests of the diaspora. This activity peaked at the 18th century. Due to the thriving trade activities of the Zagorisian diaspora several instances of donations were recorded: bridges, cobblestones, fountains, schools, temples and monasteries and social charity.

Up to the end of the Ottoman rule the native Zagorians preserved their social superiority over the other classes, as well they were engaged in lucrative and socially recognized professions. Among the Zagorians the most distinguished class due to their wealth and status were the archontes. The economic affluence of Zagori's past is still reflected in the architecture of the villages. This was accompanied by an impressive cultural and intellectual life that produced many renowned scholars and benefactors of Greece.

Over the centuries, some groups of Orthodox Albanians (locally known as Arvanites) settled in at least 12 villages of Zagori. Albanian settlers in Zagori must have been very few in the 15th century. Most of the Albanian settlement can be attributed to a later era and was fuelled by outward migration from Zagori of locals, which created the need for new inhabitants to help with local economic activities. Many Orthodox Albanians intermarried into the communities of Zagori or were adopted by Zagorisian families. They often served as guards for the villages of Zagori and their fields which had no military protection, however would occasionally resort to banditry. Hence Albanian immigrants filled these labour gaps and quickly became part of the local population. Most of them had already participated in the Greek national struggles as Klephts and were experienced warriors. Some Albanians from Konitsa (Gorgopotamos, Chionades) worked as masons or painters in Zagori but rarely settled there. Christian Orthodox Albanians have settled in at least 12 Zagori villages, including Tristeno, Aristi, Megalo Papingo, Anthrakitis, Asprangeloi, Kavallari, Kipi, Leptokarya, Monodendri, Tsepelovo, Vitsa, Vradeto and possibly Kapesovo. Local Albanian traces, with the exception of some toponyms, have disappeared.

At that era Orthodox Roma families settled in most villages in low numbers. They served as musicians and blacksmiths in Zagori. Arvanites and Roma were considered metoikoi (literary: foreigners) and comprised the lower social class in the region and lived at the outskirts of the villages without civil and property rights in Zagori politics, and were assimilated.

Greek nomadic communities of Sarakatsani appeared in Zagori in the late 18th century. They were initially used as shepherds for the flocks of the native Zagorisians, but started developing their own flocks from the mid-19th century.

Nevertheless, Zagori retained much of its Greek character through its system of government and the benefactions of its expatriates that favoured Greek education. The Koinon of the Zagorisians was reformalised by a treaty signed in 1670, under which Zagori enjoyed considerable privileges called Surutia, which were only rescinded fully by the Sultan in 1868. This solution suited the conquerors and the conquered, as it added statutory rules to the geographical factors which had made Zagori a natural refuge. Consequently, Zagori was never broken up to be shared out among Turkish landowners. Its economy flourished thanks to expatriate merchants active in Romania, Ukraine, Russia and Constantinople, who through remittances to their families and numerous benefactions contributed to the relative prosperity Zagori enjoyed during the period of Turkish rule. Schools for boys and, from the 18th century onwards, also for girls were built. Additionally, new churches and watermills to grind the corn were constructed, while the water wells were often decorated with ornamental fountains.

In the 17th century, the villages of Western Zagori were also admitted to the Treaty, so that by 1678 the total number of villages in Zagori had increased to 60. Traditional medicine flourished in the form of "Vikos doctors", who gathered herbs for their preparations from the Vikos gorge. As such Zagori became a major center of folk medicine. These herbal healers used special recipes that were often copies of ancient Greek recipes of Hippocrates or Dioscorides and became famous beyond the borders of Greece.

The growing prosperity, aided by privileges obtained by Phanariotes of Zagorisian descent and benefactions from expatriates, allowed the building of several schools, some still surviving, for example the Common School of Greek Studies (Greek: Κοινή Σχολή Ελληνικών Μαθημάτων) in Monodendri built by the brothers Manthos and Georgios Rizaris (1835). The brothers also funded the building of the Rizareios Ecclesiastical School in Athens (1844), while Zagori itself was under full Ottoman rule. The brothers Ioannis and Demetrios Anagnostopoulos from Dilofo founded the Anagnostopouleios in their home village and contributed to the expenses for the Zosimaia School in Ioannina. Michael Anagnostopoulos from Papingo built the Kallineios School in Papingo and the Anagnostopouleios School in Konitsa. As a result of the numerous schools, the Greek language was preserved in the area.

As the mountains were outside the direct rule of the Ottoman Empire, they offered a haven for Greeks on the run from the Ottoman authorities. Several prominent scholars of the Greek Enlightenment, such as Neofytos Doukas, Georgios Gennadios and Athanasios Psalidas sought refuge here, after the Sultan's army destroyed Ioannina in 1820. Some among them even made plans to set up a university in the monastery of St John of Rogovou, near Tsepelovo. In 1820, after the rebellion of Ali Pasha, a Turkish force of 1500 under Ismael Pasha arrived in Zagori, part of the total army of 20,000 sent against Ali Pasha. Alexis Noutsos from Kapesovo, a member of the Philike Hetairia, was in command of the force opposing Ismael Pasha. However, the Sultan's armies prevailed. Ismael Pasha removed most privileges other than the right to appoint a local governor (Vekylis), whose powers however became nominal. Ismael Pasha introduced very heavy taxation, amounting to 250 silver coins per person and additional taxation in kind. Zagori was liberated in 1913 during the Balkan Wars.

=== Modern period ===
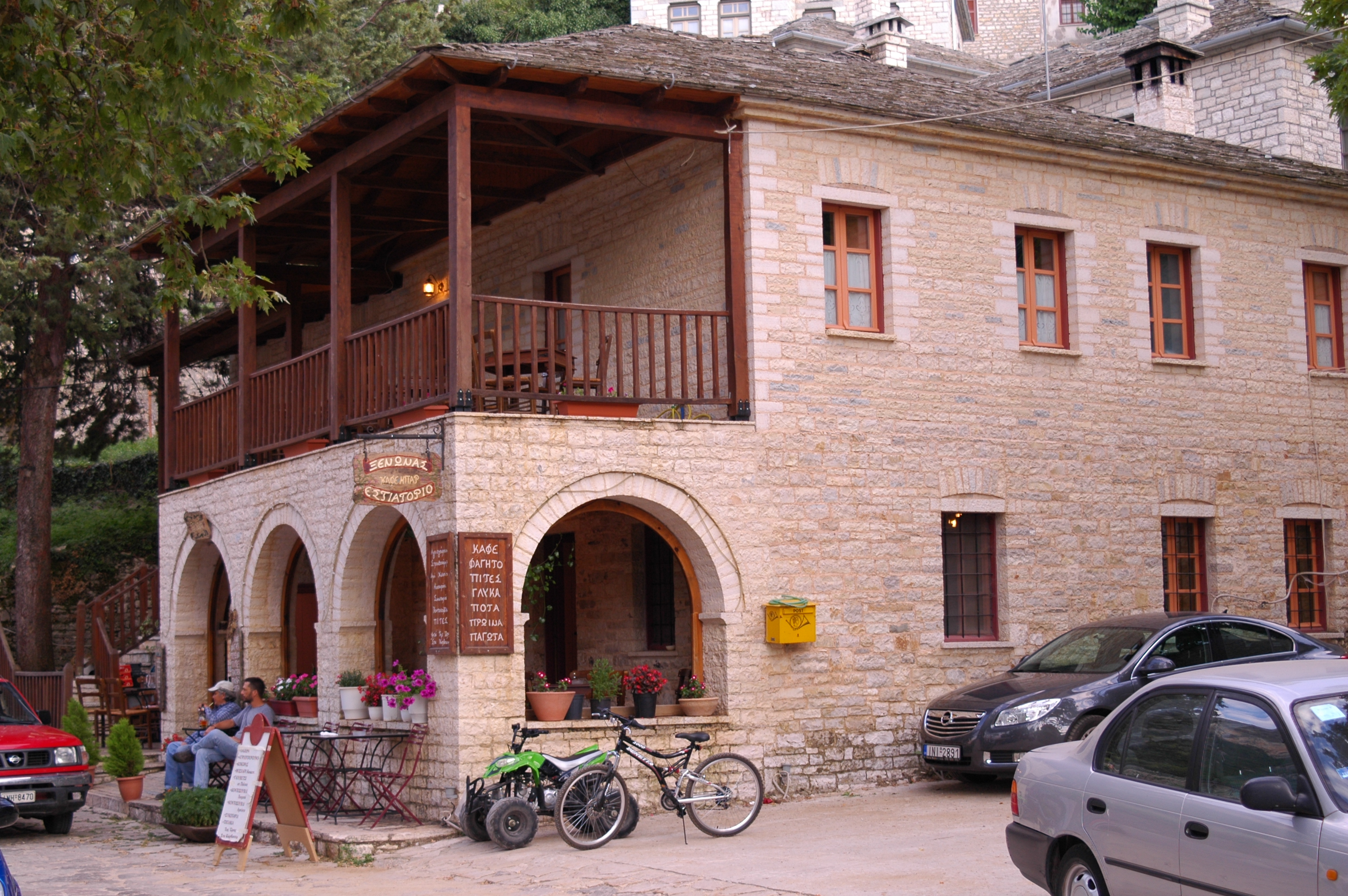
View of Aristi village

Following the union with Greece after the Balkan Wars, the area suffered a demographic decline partly due to emigration to Greek urban centres. The area of Epirus around Zagori bore the brunt of the Italian attack on Greece in 1940. The area became additionally affected by the conflicts between the Germans and the partisans of Napoleon Zervas during the Second World War. At that time several of the villages of Zagori and the monastery of Votsa were burned in German reprisals. Most of the villages became deserted during the Greek Civil War of 1946–1949. Since the 1980s, state initiatives aim to preserve the traditional character of the villages and the natural landscape. In September 2023, UNESCO added Zagori to the list of Cultural Landscapes, acknowledging the universal value of Zagori's architecture as a representative example of traditional, stone-built settlements. This recognition highlights its significance in the shared heritage of Byzantine and Ottoman architecture within the broader Balkan region.

== Folklore ==
Unique customs are associated with Hellenistic or Christian festivals. The larger churches and monasteries celebrate their nominal saint feast with a festival that can last several days.

Characteristic songs of mourning (moirologia) accompany the lamentation of the dead. Funerary rites include the exhumation of the bones of the deceased following a period of 1–3 years. The bones are washed, perfumed and placed in a wooden larnax and kept in ossuaries in each village.

== Traditional architecture ==
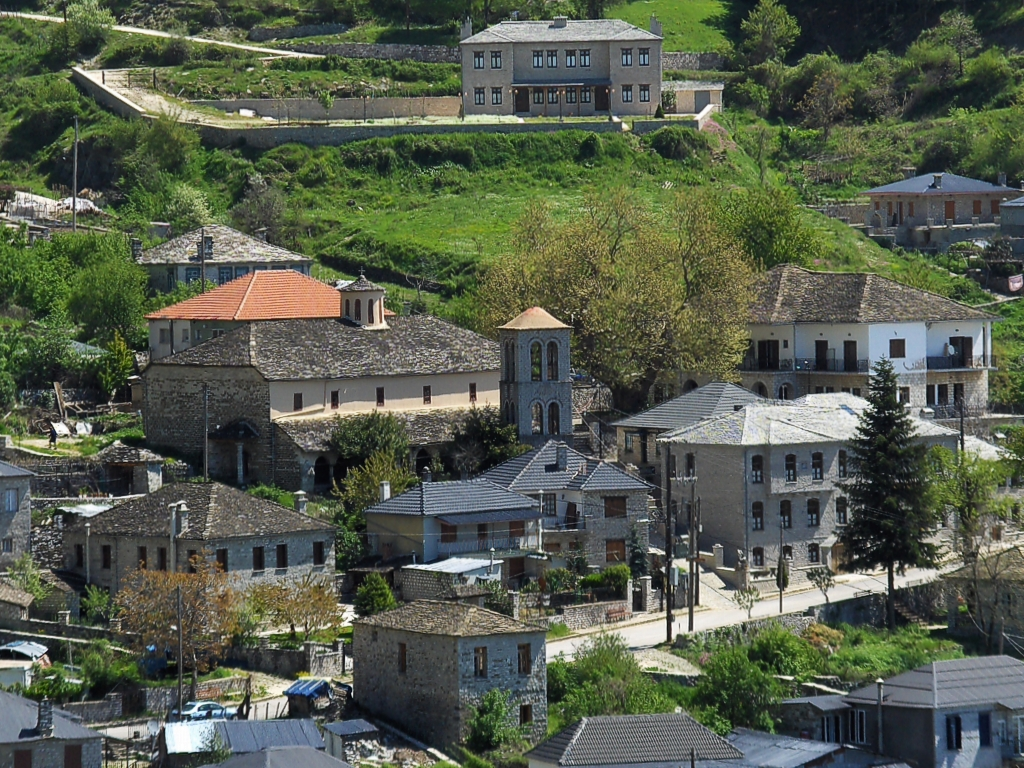
Skamneli village, example of Epirotic architecture

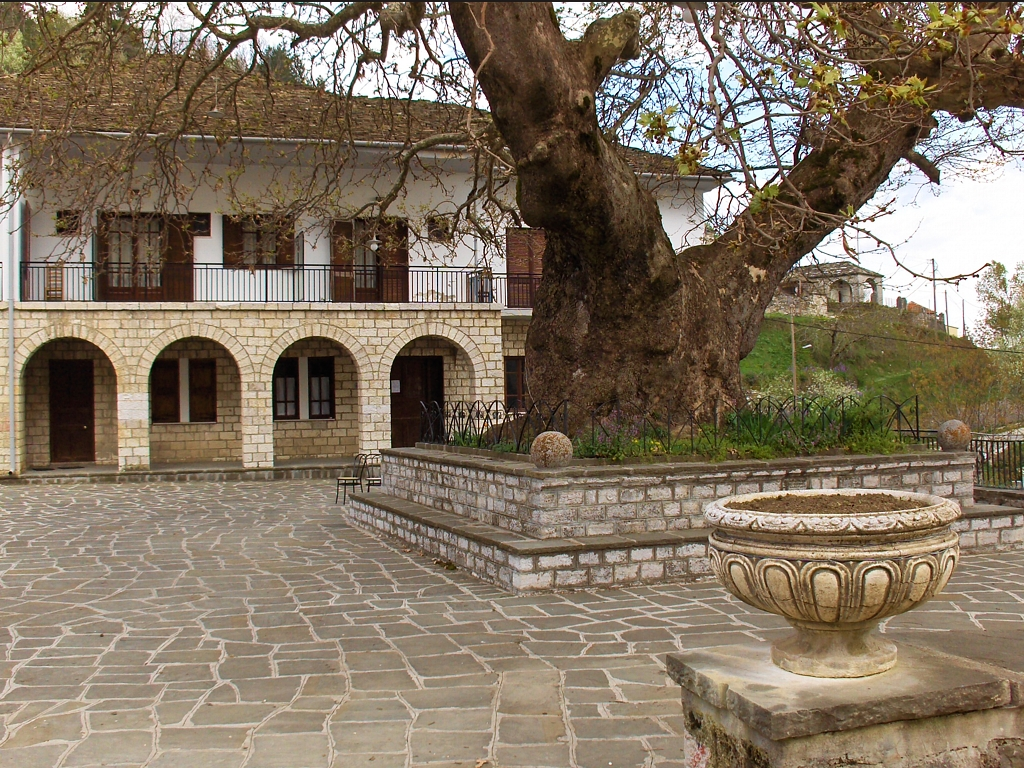
Central square of Skamneli village

Historically, all the villages of the Zagori region were connected by a system of paths or small roads and they functioned more like a single entity rather than as separate communities.

Villages are built around a central square, also called mesochori (village centre) with a large church, a plane tree and a public fountain. Cobbled streets and footpaths interconnect the rest of the village. Each individual neighbourhood has a smaller church.

=== Churches ===
Most churches in Zagori date from the 17–18th centuries onwards, although some older foundations survive. In most villages the main church consists of a sizeable basilica built of stone with a wooden roof covered by slate. They are decorated by mainly Epirotan iconographers in the Byzantine tradition. The entrance to the church may be protected by a colonnaded arcade. The campanile is usually detached from the church.

=== Houses ===
Houses until the 18th century were simple rectangular dwellings, often with only a ground floor and with ancillary areas in the basement used as stables. Indeed, this appears to be the style of construction of the dwellings in the excavated Molossian site near Vitsa. Houses are built of local stone and have a roof made of stone tiles (either of limestone or sandstone) which are held together without cement, only by the weight of the tiles above them. The stone roof therefore requires continual upkeep, subjected as it is to heavy snowfalls during the winter months.

That older type was developed through the 18–19th centuries into more complex styles all the way to the multi-storied manors of the wealthier families of the late 18th century. Many houses are fronted by a walled courtyard or garden. The courtyard gate is an edifice in itself, covered by a stone roof and connecting the house to the rest of the village. In addition to the house, there are ancillary buildings, usually a "mageirio" (kitchen), an external toilet at the furthest corner from the kitchen, and stables. The main house is built with walls up to a meter thick that may have an internal sand compartment for insulation against the cold. The house entrance opens into the foyer called "hagiati" which leads to adjoining rooms called "ondas" or "mantzato". The hagiati originally was and sometimes still is a partially open area in front of the house. The name is probably derived from the Persian word Hayāt, a style of Persian garden with pavilions or other edifices. The mantzato is the main room for the winter months with a fireplace, a "tavla" (table) and seating areas that can be used as beds, called "basia". Opposite the fireplace there is a walled closet called "mesantra". As an aid to its function, the mantzato often has a location in the south of the house.

A usually wooden staircase leads from the hagiati to the upper floor landing called "krevatta". This is a space between the bedrooms. In rare cases, the krevatta opens into a small balcony covered by a wooden roof. "Glavané" is a small entrance to the attic. The basement of the house contains cellars and other storage areas that may be used as additional quarters for animals.

Few of the old manors survive, most having fallen victim to disrepair. In those that survive, the ondas room is the most spacious, has a large fireplace and may have floral frescoes. It was used for the reception of guests.

=== Bridges ===
More than 160 arched bridges were built in the greater area of Zagori, many of which still stand helping travelers to cross the numerous rivers and streams of the region. They were mostly built during the 18th and 19th centuries by local master craftsmen using local stone. These bridges usually have one to three arches called "kamares" in Greek. One of the most iconic is the three arched bridge of Plakidas, also known as Kalogeriko, near the village of Kipoi (Κἠποι).

== The Vikos Gorge ==
The Vikos Gorge or Vikos Canyon at the heart of the Vikos–Aoös National Park, is the most impressive natural feature of the region. A seasonal river runs through the Vikos Gorge which is about 38 km long. The deepest part of the gorge is about 12 km long. In the middle of its main part, far from road access or villages, it is traversed by Megas Lakkos, an equally deep secondary gorge. The Voidomatis river has its source in the Vikos Gorge and then continues to flow through its own smaller gorge into the river Aoös. The Vikos Gorge at 990m deep near Monodendri while Mt Tymphe, in which it lies, is 1350 m at its highest peak. It is one of the deepest gorges in the world, indeed the deepest in proportion to its width. The Vikos Gorge is also a site of major scientific interest, because it is in an almost pristine natural condition, untouched by human activity. It is a haven for endangered species and contains many and varied ecosystems.

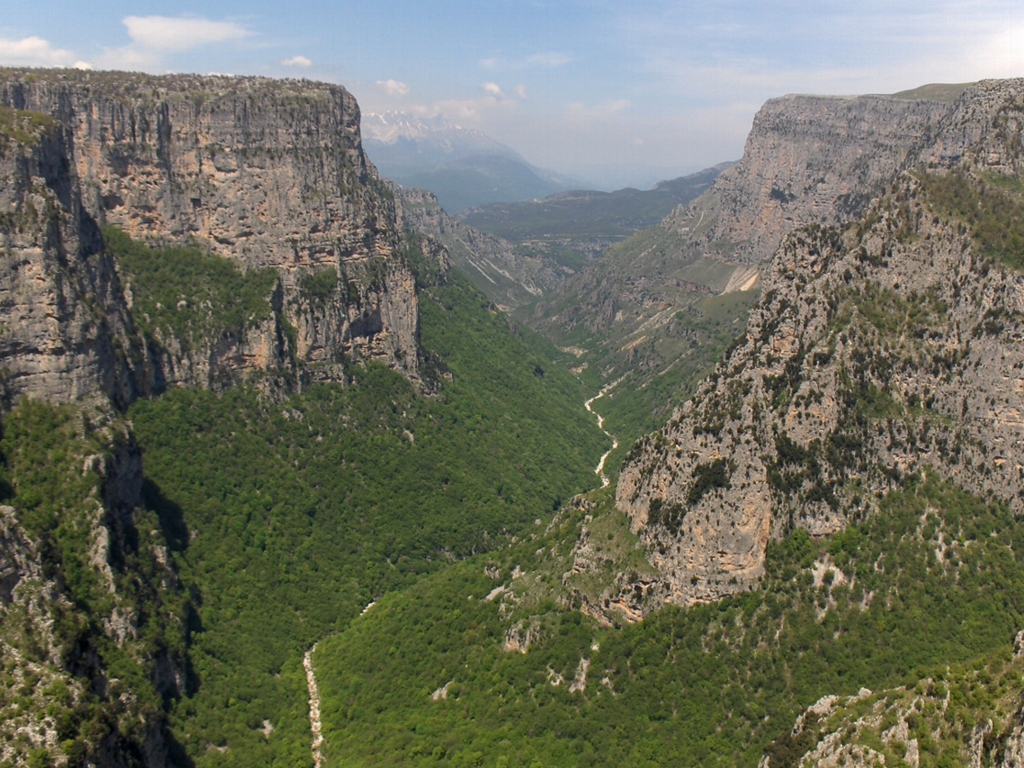
Vikos Gorge from Beloe

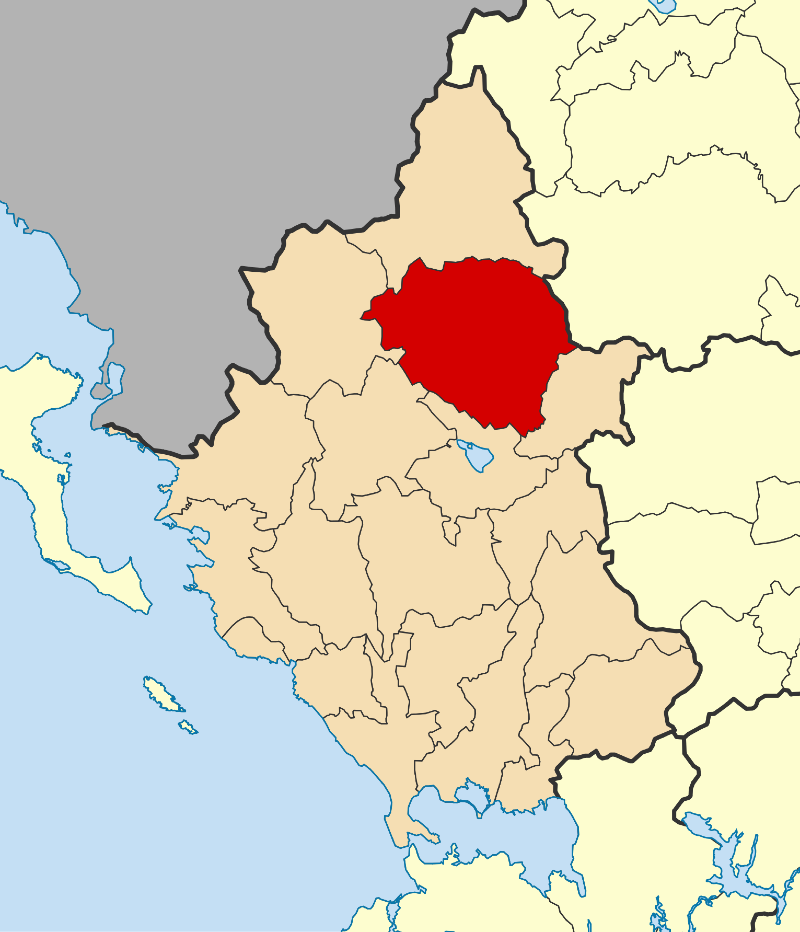
Municipality of Zagori

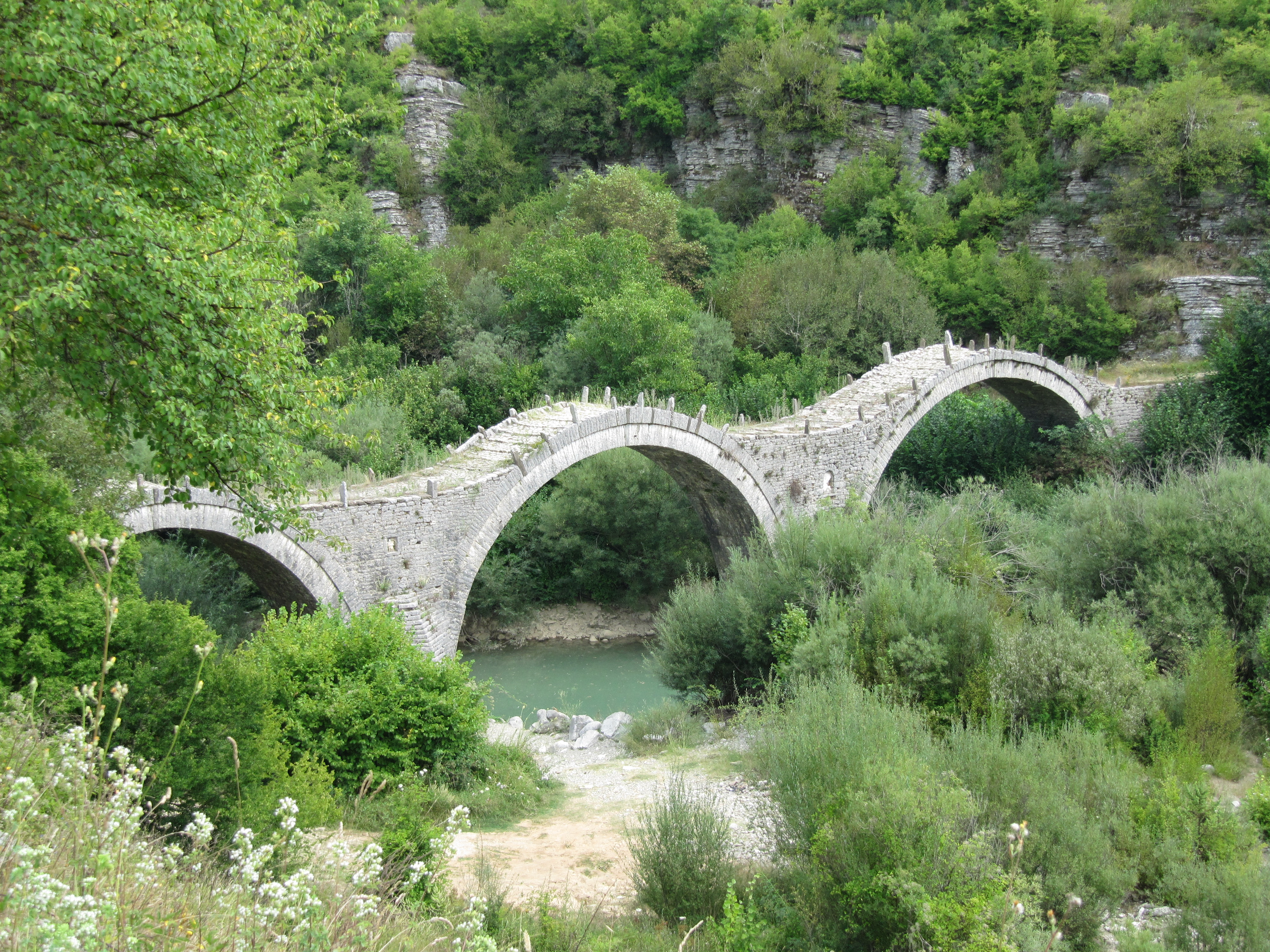
Kalogeriko bridge, Vikos-Aoos National Park

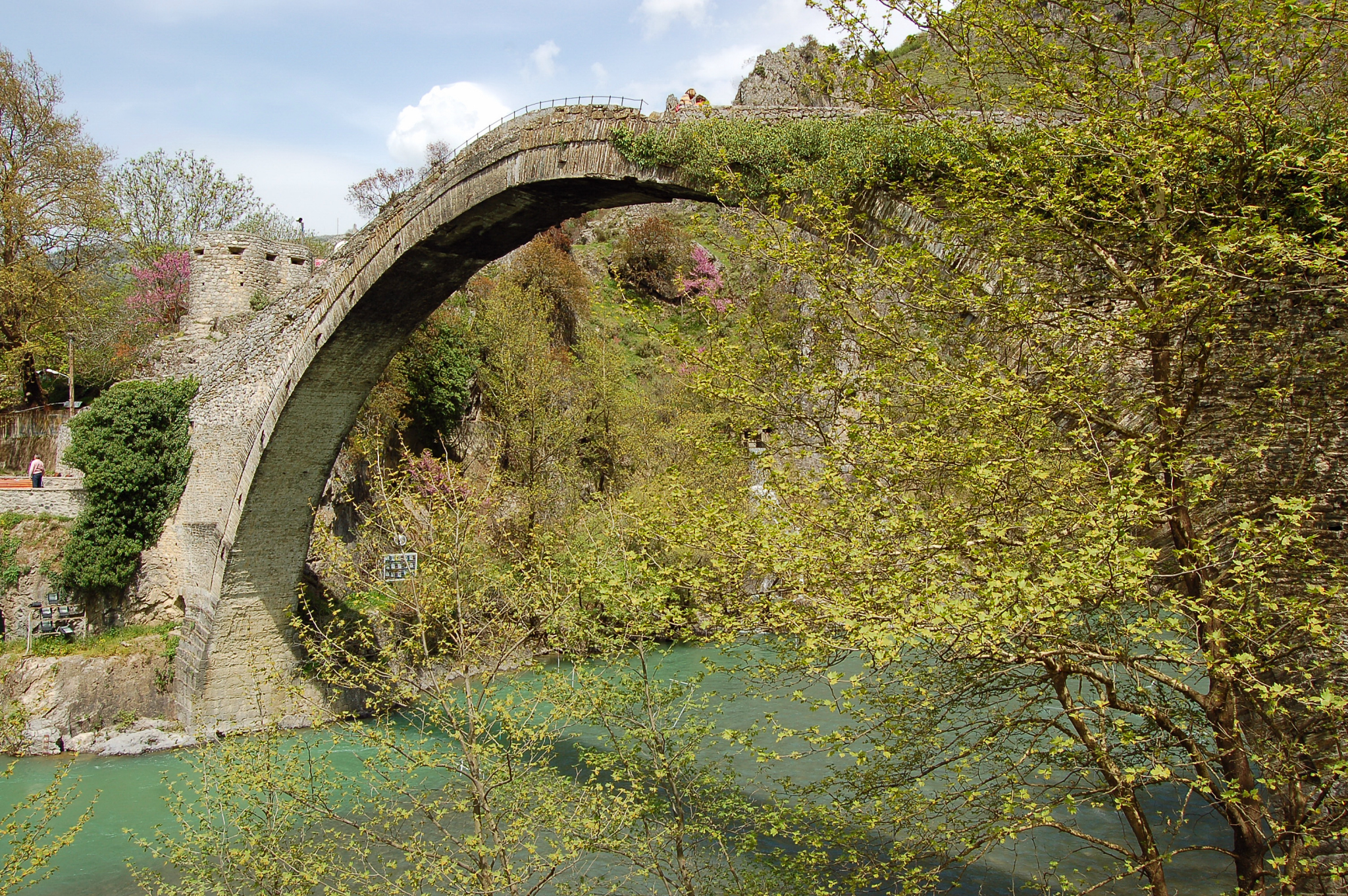
Konitsa bridge, Vikos-Aoos National Park

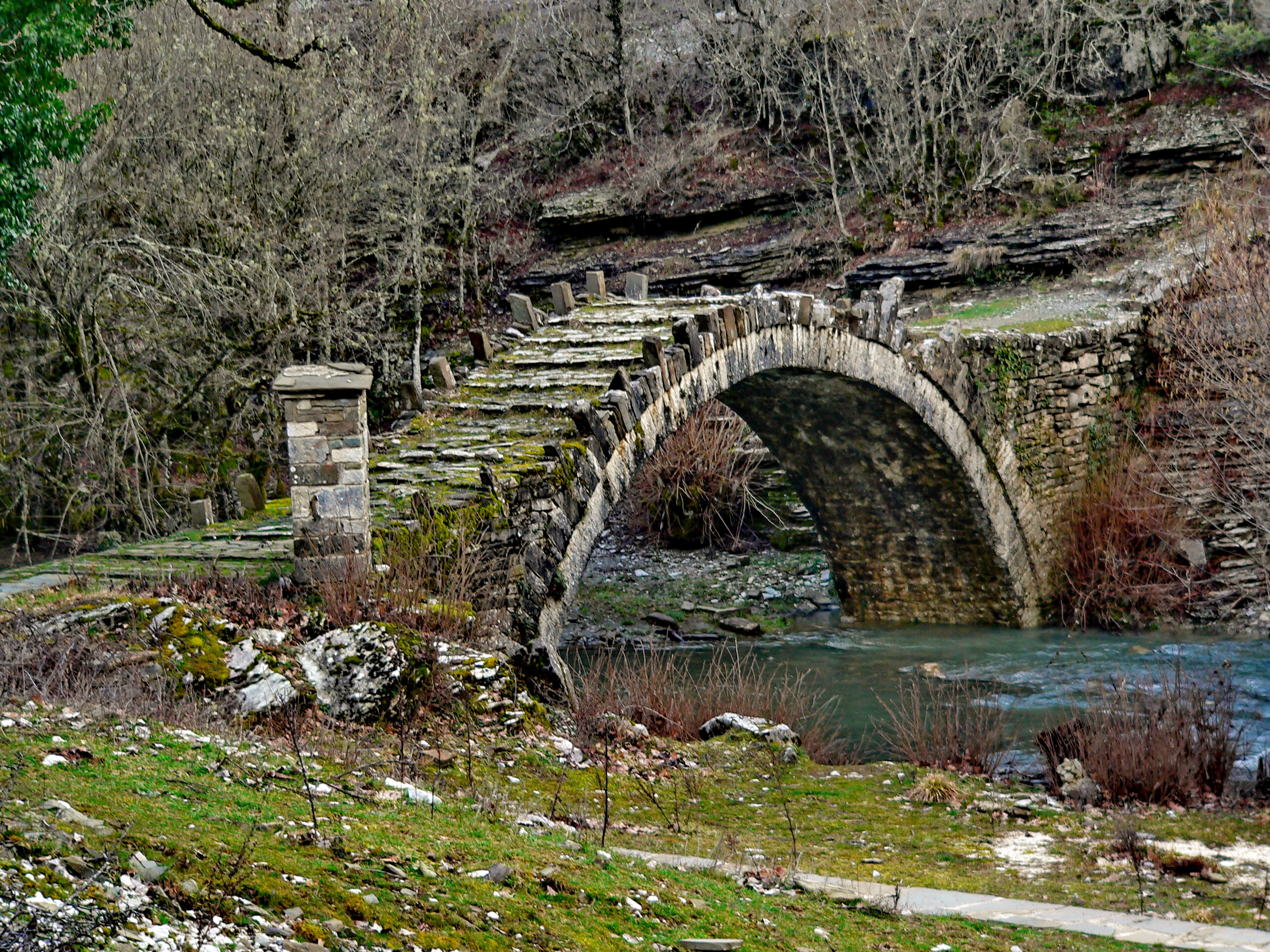
Captain Arkoudas bridge

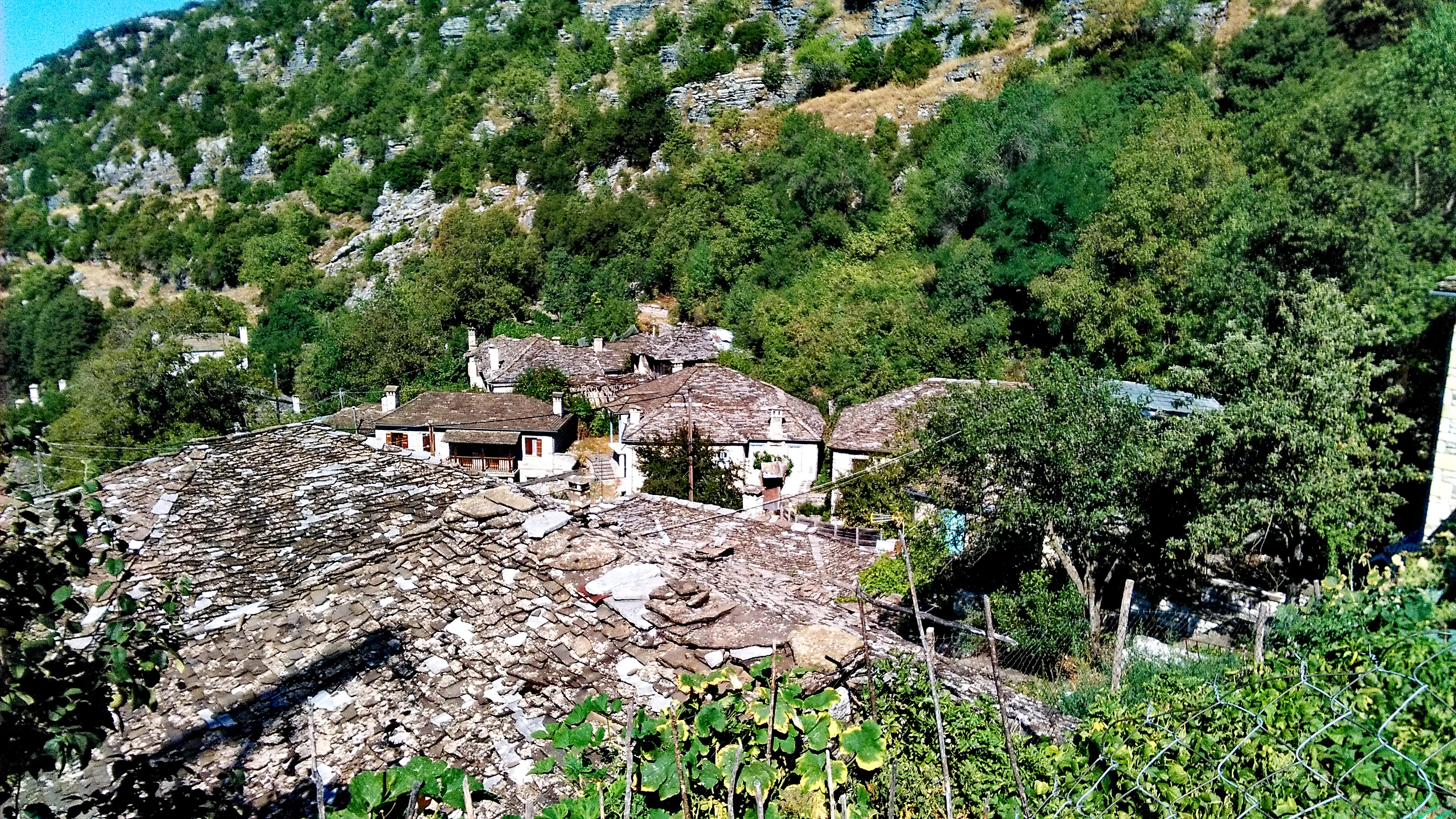
Partial view of Kapesovo village

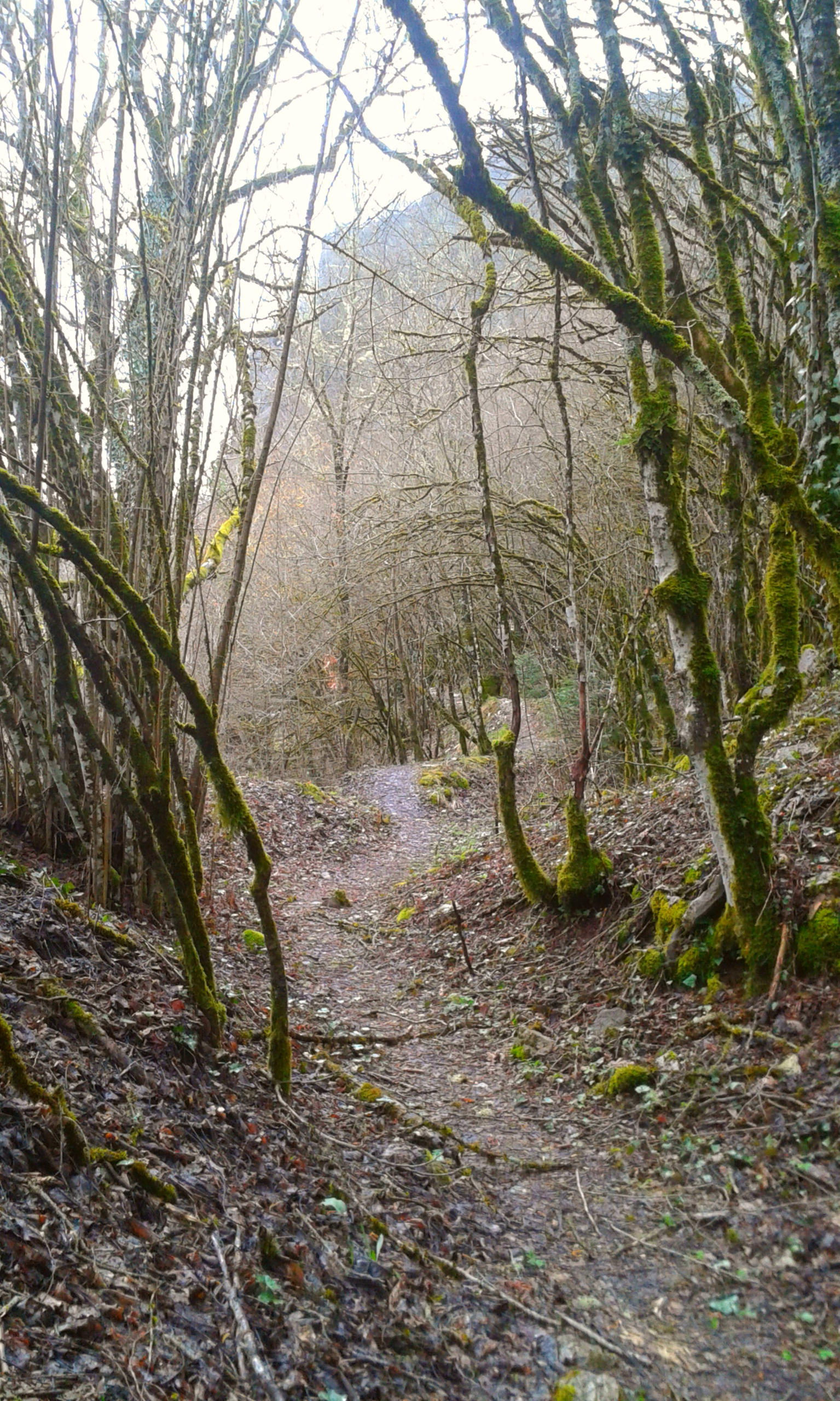
Trail in the woods that leads to the Zagori region

== Municipality and villages ==
The municipality Zagori was formed at the 2011 local government reform by the merger of the following five former municipalities, that became municipal units (constituent communities in brackets):

- Central Zagori (Agios Minas, Ano Pedina, Aristi, Asprangeloi, Vitsa, Dikorfo, Vikos, Dilofo, Dipotamo, Elati, Elafotopos, Kaloutas, Kato Pedina, Manassis, Mesovouni, Monodendri)
- East Zagori (Agia Paraskevi, Anthrakitis, Greveniti, Demati, Doliani, Elatochori, Itea, Kavallari, Karyes, Kastanonas, Makrino, Petra, Potamia, Tristeno, Flambourari)
- Papingo
- Tymfi (Vradeto, Vrysochori, Iliochori, Kapesovo, Kipoi, Koukouli, Laista, Leptokarya, Negades, Skamneli, Tsepelovo, Frangades)
- Vovousa

== Famous Zagorians ==
=== Art ===
- John Cassavetes, actor and director
- Marika Kotopouli, actress
- Alekos Sakellarios, director

=== Commerce and Philanthropy ===
- Manthos and Georgios Rizaris, benefactors, merchants, members of Filiki Eteria and founders of the Rizarios Hieratical School in Athens

=== Education and Literature ===
- Methodios Anthrakites (1660–1736), scholar and priest
- Neophytos Doukas (1760–1845), scholar
- Georgios Gennadios (1786–1854), scholar
- Matthaios Paranikas (1832-1914), scholar, writer and teacher
- Dimitrios Sarros (1869/70-1937), scholar, writer, soldier and teacher
- Angelos Kitsos (1934–2008), former president of Rizarios Foundation

=== Politics ===
- Manthos Oikonomou, chancellor of Ali Pasha, member of Filiki Eteria
- Michael Dukakis, US politician and Democratic presidential nominee in 1988
- Lefteris Zagoritis, former member of the Greek Parliament

== See also ==
- Vikos–Aoös National Park

== Sources ==
- Amanatidou, Despoina (2005). "A case study in Vikos-Aoos National Park – Greece" (PDF). University of Freiburg.
- Kahl, Thede (1999). "Die Zagóri-Dörfer in Nordgriechenland: Wirtschaftliche Einheit – ethnische Vielfalt" [The Zagóri Villages in Northern Greece: Economic Unity – Ethnic Diversity]. Ethnologia Balkanica (in German). 3: 103–119.
- Tsefos, Konstantinos (2001). "Monastery Architecture in Zagori (1430 - 1913)". Didaktorika.gr (in Greek). Πανεπιστήμιο Ιωαννίνων. Σχολή Φιλοσοφική. Τμήμα Ιστορίας και Αρχαιολογίας: 15. doi:10.12681/eadd/13429. hdl:10442/hedi/13429.
- Vokou, Despina; Katradia, Katerina; Kokkini, Stella (1993). "Ethnobotanical survey of Zagori (Epirus, Greece), a renowned center of folk medicine in the past". Journal of Ethnopharmacology. 39 (3): 187–196. doi:10.1016/0378-8741(93)90035-4. PMID 8258976.
- Zissis, Costas (2006). ZAGORI, Images of a Greek Heritage. Costas Zissis. ISBN 978-960-631-684-5.
