= Vikos Gorge =

Canyon in Greece

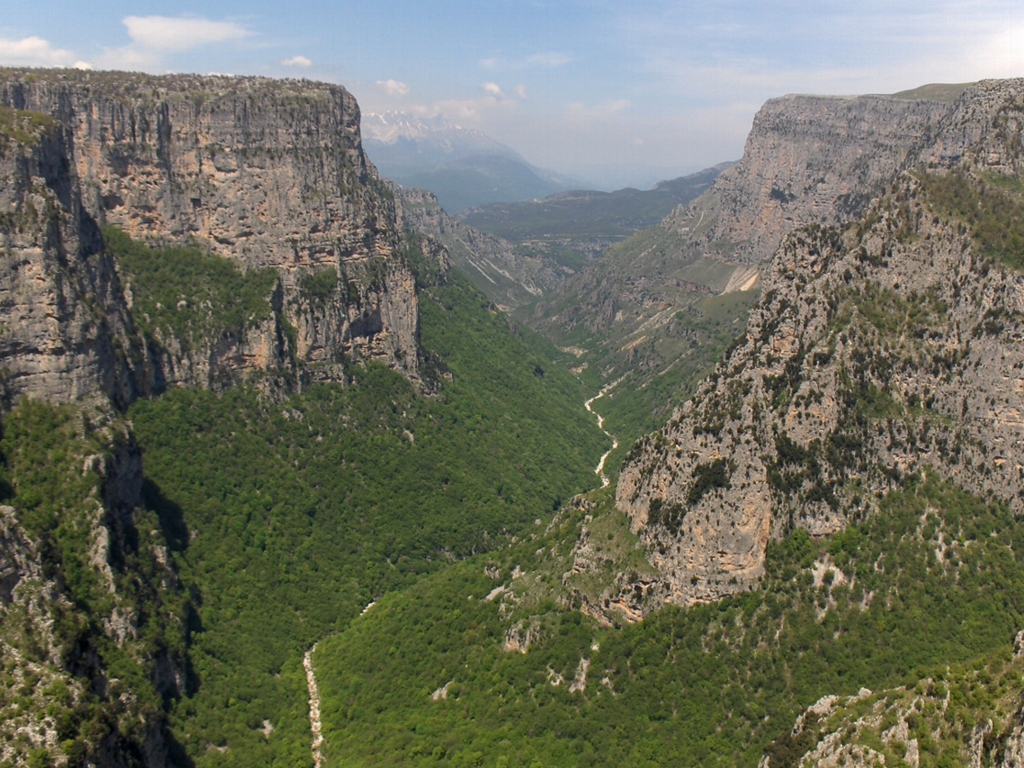
- View of Vikos Gorge from Beloi

- Location within Greece

Geography
- Country: Greece
- State/Province: Epirus
- District: Ioannina
- Population center: Zagori
- Coordinates: 39°58′10″N 20°43′42″E
- Interactive map of Vikos Gorge

The Vikos Gorge or Vikos Canyon (Greek: Φαράγγι του Βίκου) is a gorge in the Pindus Mountains of northwestern Greece. It lies on the southern slopes of Mount Tymphe with a length of about 32 km, depth ranging from 120 to 1350 m, and a width ranging from 2500 m to only a few meters at its narrowest part.

Vikos is listed as the world's "deepest relative to its width" gorge by the Guinness Book of Records among others.

== Etymology ==
There are a number of views regarding the etymology of the name:

- According to Ioannis Lambridis it derives from Slavic and means 'chasm' or 'gorge'.
- According to Evangelos Bogas it derives from the Greek βίκος 'stamnos with ears', which denotes the shape of the gorge and the echoes caused by sounds within it. The word was recorded in the lexicon of Hesychius of Alexandria.
- According to Konstantinos Amantos it derives from the Greek phytonym βικίον.
- According to Konstantinos Oikonomou it derives from an Albanian word for bridge or wooden pass, vig-u or vig-ku, due to an Ottoman-era wooden bridge that was once placed in the canyon; Kostandin Kristoforidhi associates it with the ancient Greek word βαβύκα 'bridge', recorded in the lexicon of Hesychius of Alexandria. Τhe same word is also found in the Greek dialects of northern Epirus with the form βίγκι, and in Aromanian with the forms vig or viga.

== Location ==
The gorge is found in the core zone of the Vikos–Aoös National Park, in the Zagori region. Its main part begins between the villages of Vitsa and Koukouli and ends near the village of Vikos (or Vitsiko). The gorge collects the waters of small, mostly seasonal streams and leads them into the Voidomatis River which forms in the end part of the main gorge. The major part of the Vikos gorge stream is only seasonal, and is permanent only at the lowest part of the gorge. Vikos is also a site of major scientific interest, because it is in almost virgin condition, it is a haven for endangered species and contains many and varied ecosystems.

== Geomorphology ==
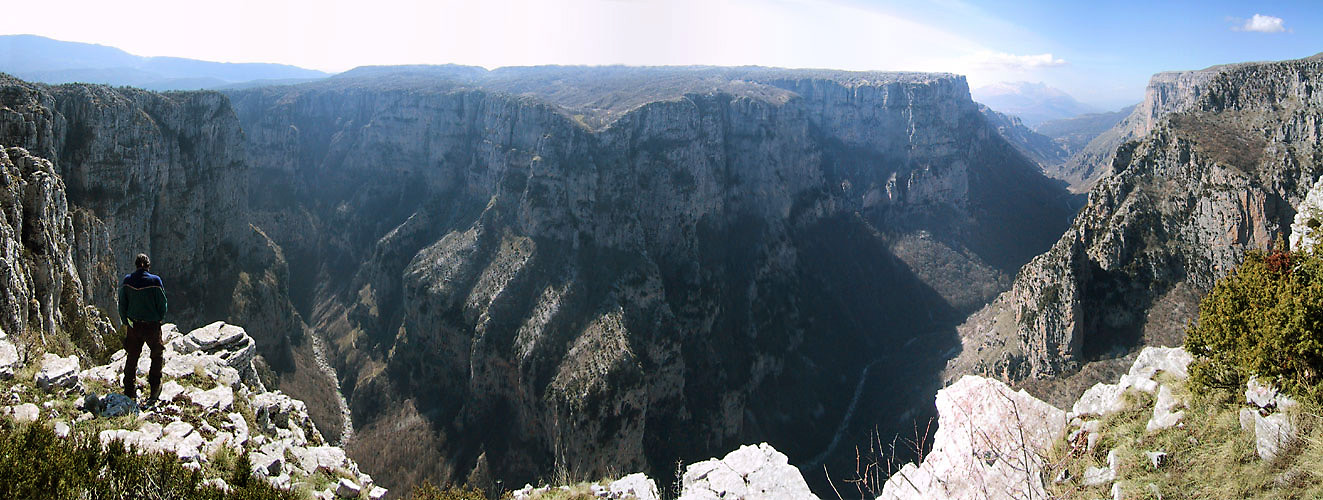
Panoramic view of Vikos Gorge.

The Vikos Gorge, with a length of 32 km (20 mi), walls that range from 120–1,350 m (390–4,400 ft) deep, and a width ranging from 2,500 m (8,202 ft) to just a few meters at its narrowest part, is listed by the Guinness Book of Records as the deepest canyon in the world in proportion to its width, though some gorge lobbyists contest that claim. The main part of the gorge stretches from the village of Vikos to Monodendri, and attains a depth of about 1,350 m (4,429 ft).

The landscape of the 32 km long gorge, 12 km of which belongs to the park's core zone, presents a diverse relief and is characterized by abrupt altitudinal changes. Steep slopes and precipitous rocky cliffs dominate in the middle and higher zones respectively. Numerous gullies dissect both sides of the gorge and the movement of water detaching various rocky materials creates extended screes. The gorge, with a northwest-southeast direction, has been carved over millions of years by the Vikos Stream and its continuation, the Voidomatis River, a tributary of the Aoös (Vjosa).

As the Vikos Gorge is a deep cross section of the mountain, its slopes expose a series of rock formations of various ages. The upper layers, at a depth of 0–200 m (660 ft), consist of relatively young Eocene limestone, at a depth of 200 m (660 ft)–700 m (2,300 ft) they consist of a stratum from the Campanian era, while below 700 m (2,300 ft) they consist of Jurassic and Cretaceous limestone. In the deepest layers, grey Jurassic dolomite is dominant. Sedimentary and lithological investigation in the Voidomatis basin revealed that the innermost alluvial deposits consist of limestone-derived material, carried by the Voidomatis river from higher elevations by glacial action about 30,000 years ago. The subsequent (middle) deposits are the product of de-glaciation and the extended run-off from the uplands about 20,000 years ago, while the outer unit is attributed to human activities associated with pastoralism, which caused extended deforestation and soil erosion. The Voidomatis basin contains evidence for three major phases of glaciation, with the two largest and earliest taking place during the Middle Pleistocene. The final phase of glacial activity probably occurred during the Last Glacial Maximum, between 22,000 and 20,000 ago.

During the large Middle Pleistocene glaciations, surface runoff from glacial meltwaters would have fed directly into the river channel network because much of the upland limestone terrain was covered by ice, and many conduits in the karst would have been choked with sediment or permanently frozen. As a result, the glacier snouts came close to the modern valley bottoms. In contrast, during interglacial and interstadial periods, more effective coupling occurred between the surface drainage network and the internal karst drainage system. Since limestone dissolves as the water percolates through its pores, an extended underground drainage system has developed, with caves and channels that enlarge with time when their roofs collapse, producing rocky exposures and perpendicular slopes, which is also the reason why the water is scarce. Only when an impenetrable stratum is met, does water appear on the surface.

== Wildlife ==
=== Flora ===
Many herbs of the Vikos Gorge and adjacent areas within the Vikos-Aoos National park were regarded to have medicinal properties and were once harvested by local healers, colloquially referred to as "Vikos doctors" (Greek: Βικογιατροί, "Vikoiatri"). These herbal healers used special recipes that were often copies of ancient Greek recipes of Hippocrates or Dioscorides and became famous beyond the borders of Greece. The plants used in these recipes include the lemon balm Melissa officinalis, Tilia tomentosa, the spearmint Mentha spicata, the gas-plant Dictamnus albus, St John’s Wort Hypericum perforatum, absinth Artemisia absinthium, the very popular Sideritis raeseri, known colloquially in Greece as “mountain tea”, and the elder bush Sambucus nigra. A chemical screening of these native plant species has shown that many are characterized by biologically active ingredients. A collection of 2,500 dried species of local plants and herbs is exhibited in the local natural history museum in the village of Koukouli.

=== Fauna ===
One of the special local attractions is the existence of the chamois (Rupicapra rupicapra), a rare species that lives at higher altitudes far from human activity, especially at the rocky cliffs, for example in Megas Lakos, a secondary ravine of the Vikos Gorge.

== Recreation ==
There is a natural viewing platform over the deepest part of the gorge at Oxia, a location 8 km by a newly constructed road from the village of Monodendri. Another viewpoint over the gorge is at Beloi, on the eastern side of the gorge, accessible from the village of Vradeto.

A hiking trail descends into the gorge from Monodendri. The trail then leads north through the gorge to the springs of the Voidomatis river, from where paths lead out of the gorge to the village of Papingo on the north side of the gorge, or to the village of Vikos on the south side of the gorge. It is also possible to hike south through the gorge from Monodendri to the 18th century stone bridges near Kipi.

== Human history ==
Important epipaleolithic artifacts have been unearthed from the Kleithi rock shelter on the banks of the Voidomatis. During the 9th–4th centuries B.C., a small Molossian settlement existed between Monodendri and Vitsa, including stone houses and two cemeteries that have yielded important findings. However, for most of the historical period the local population in the nearby villages was sparse. The land adjacent of the Vikos gorge, as well as the gorge itself, was mainly used for pastoralism and supplying firewood.

== Gallery ==
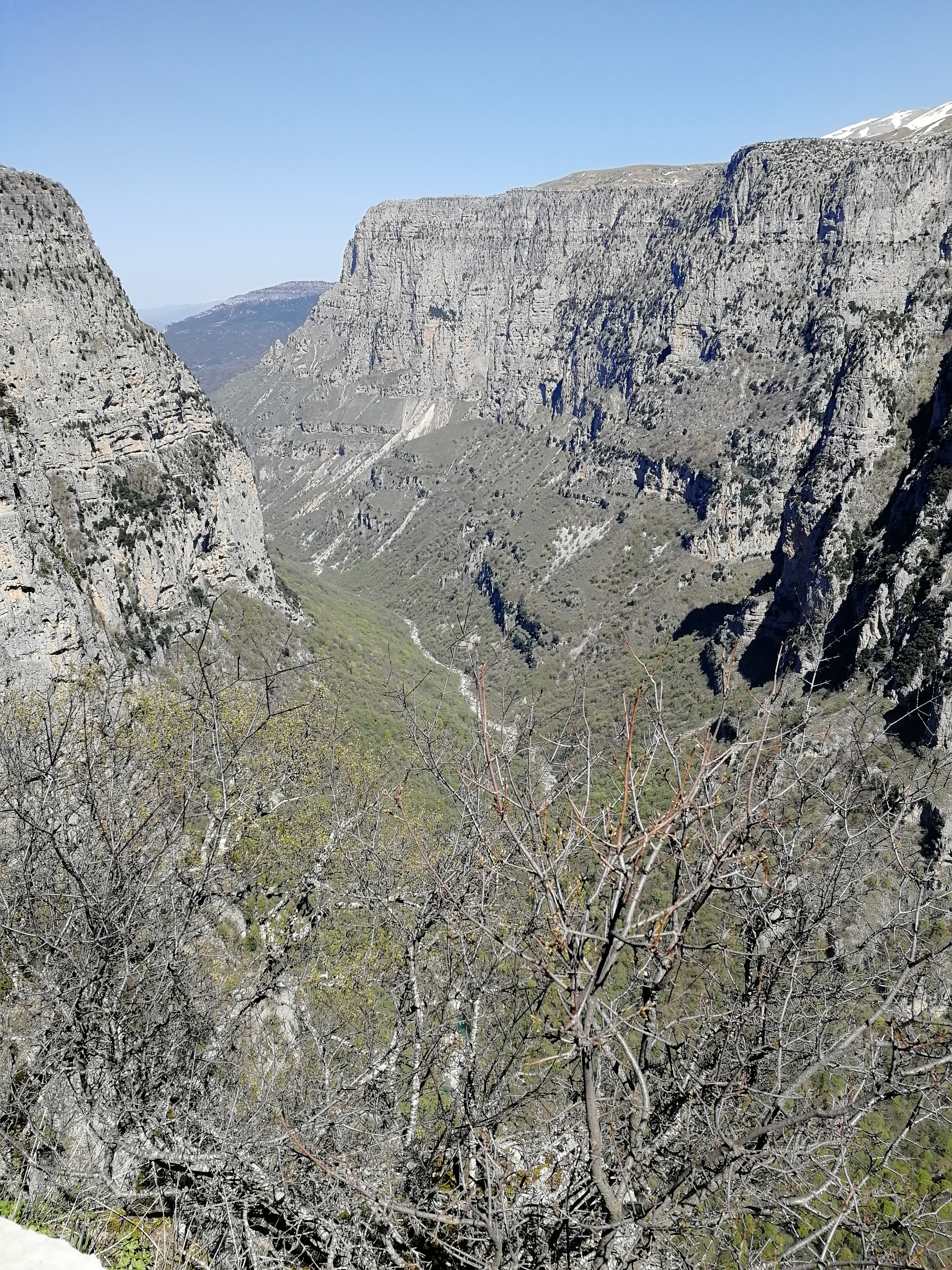
View of Vikos Gorge from Oxia.

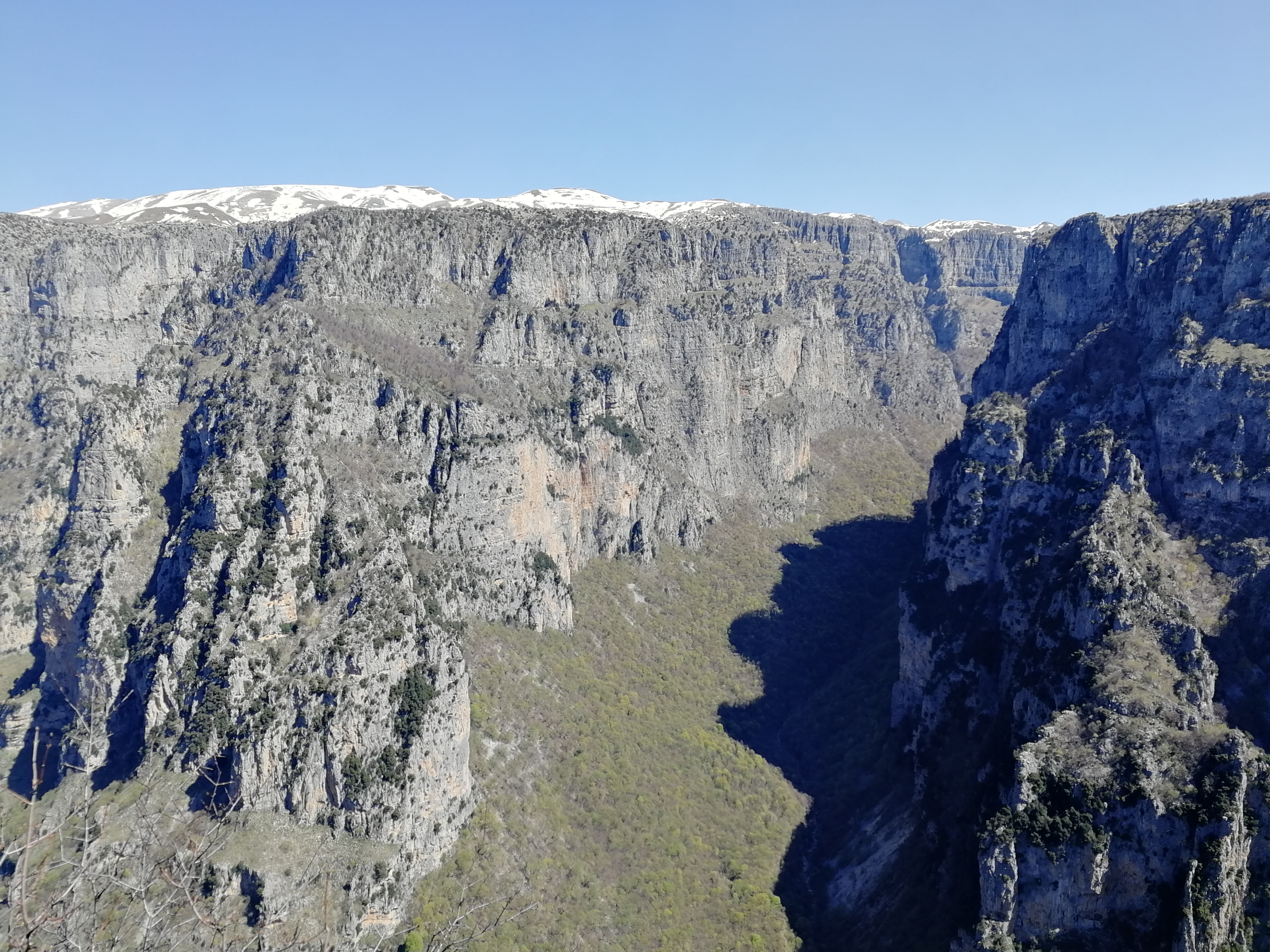
View of Vikos Gorge from Oxia.

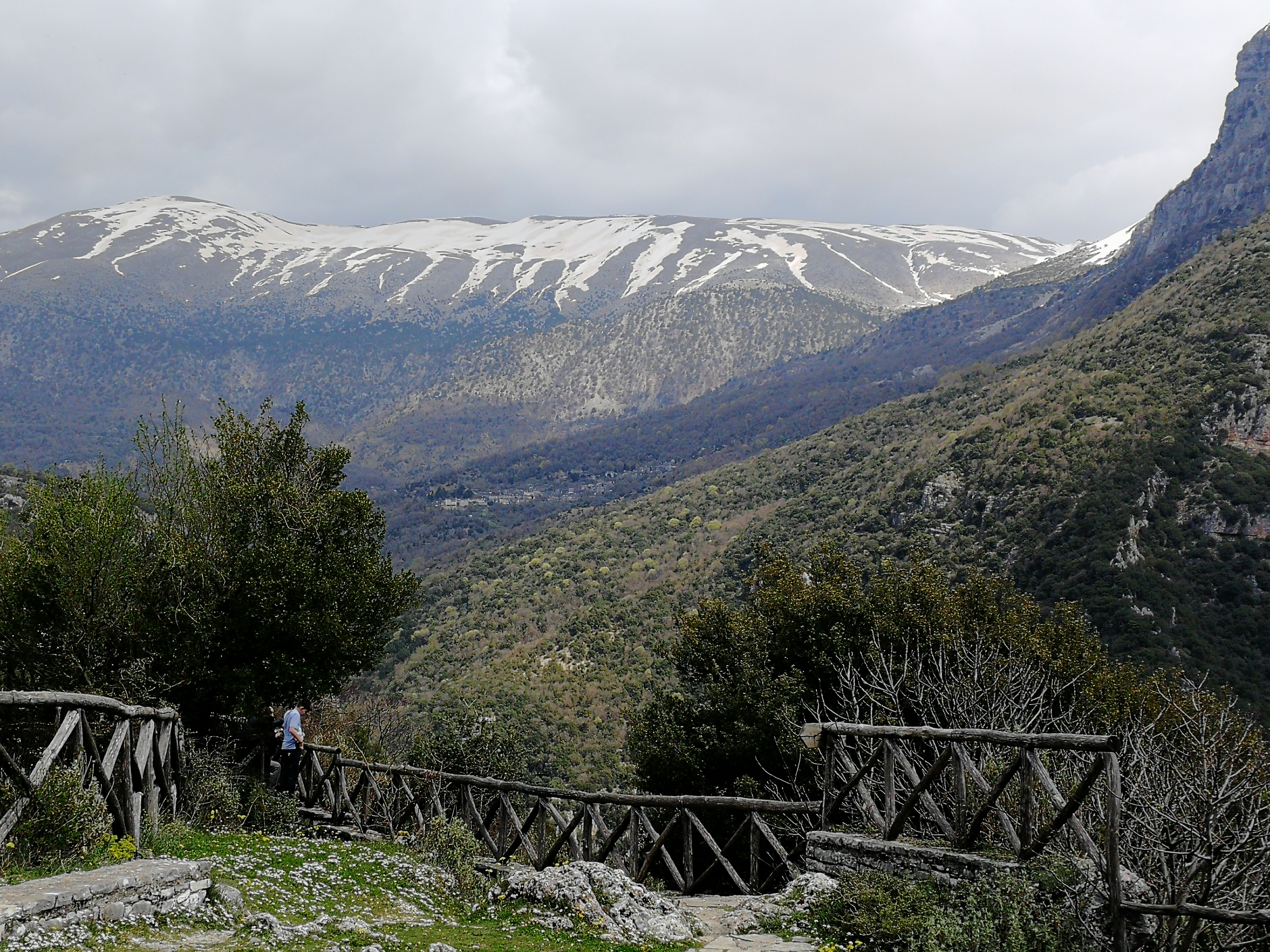
View of Vikos Gorge from Vikos village.

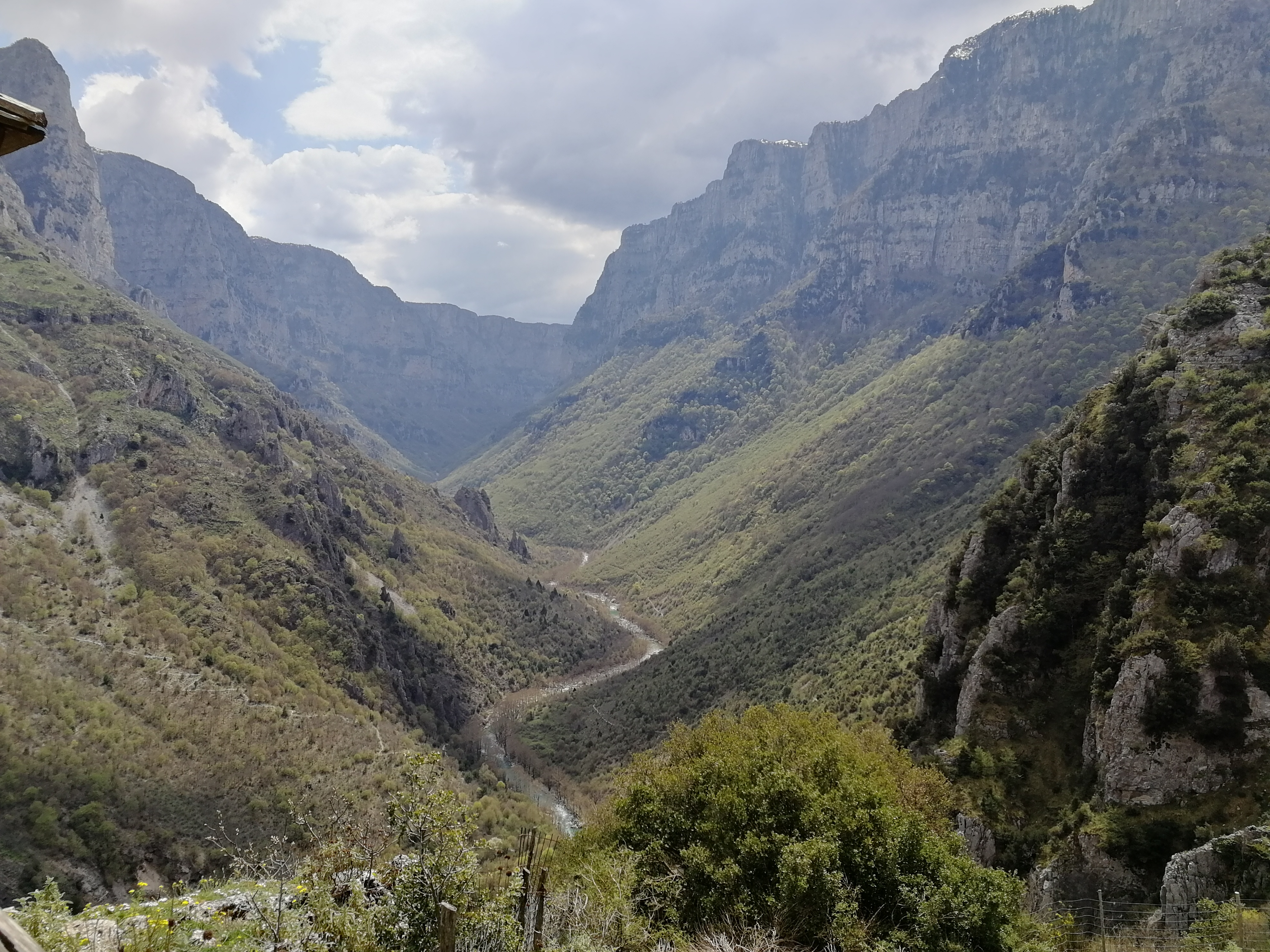
View of Vikos Gorge from Vikos village.

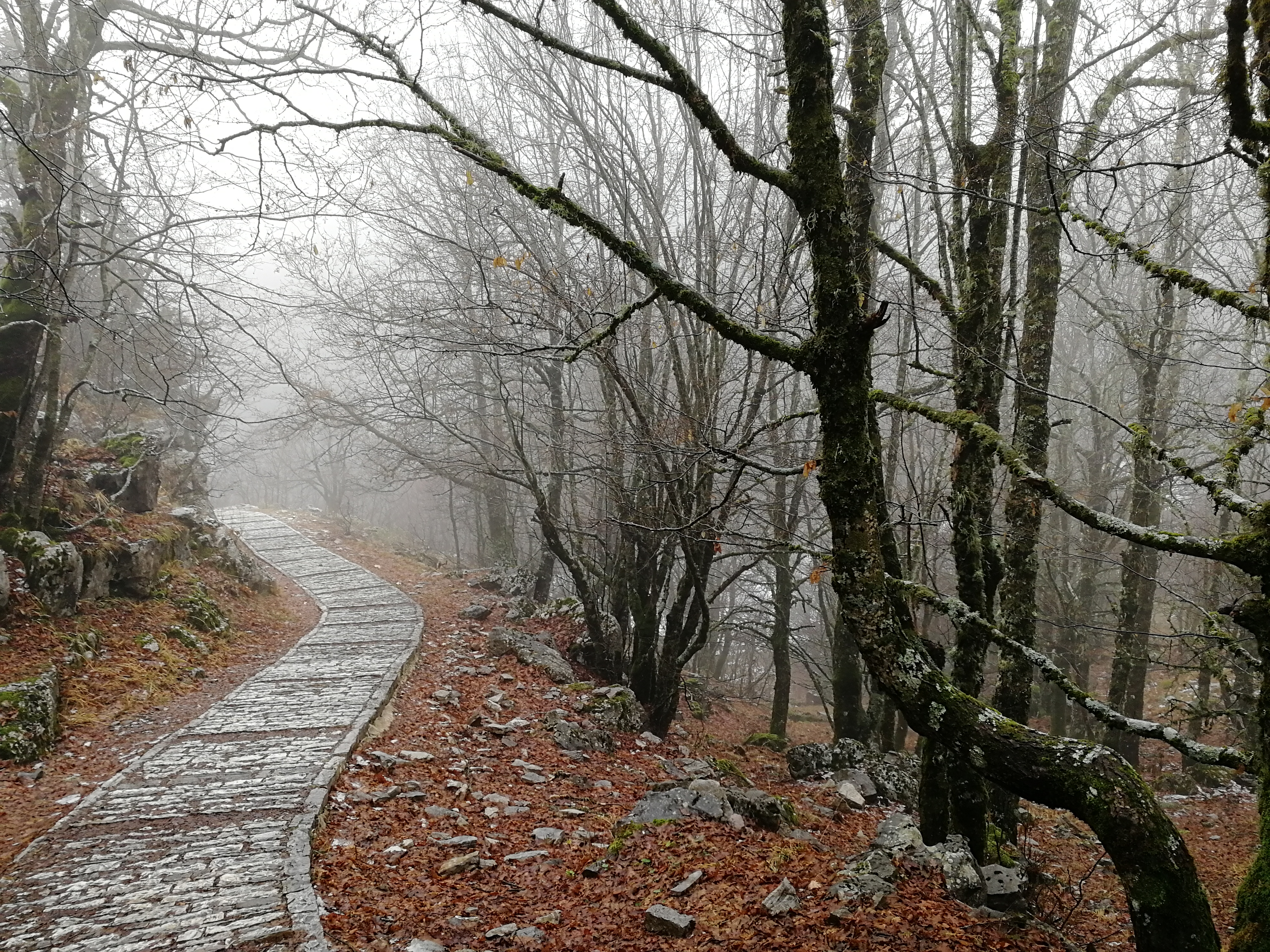
Trail that leads to Vikos Gorge.

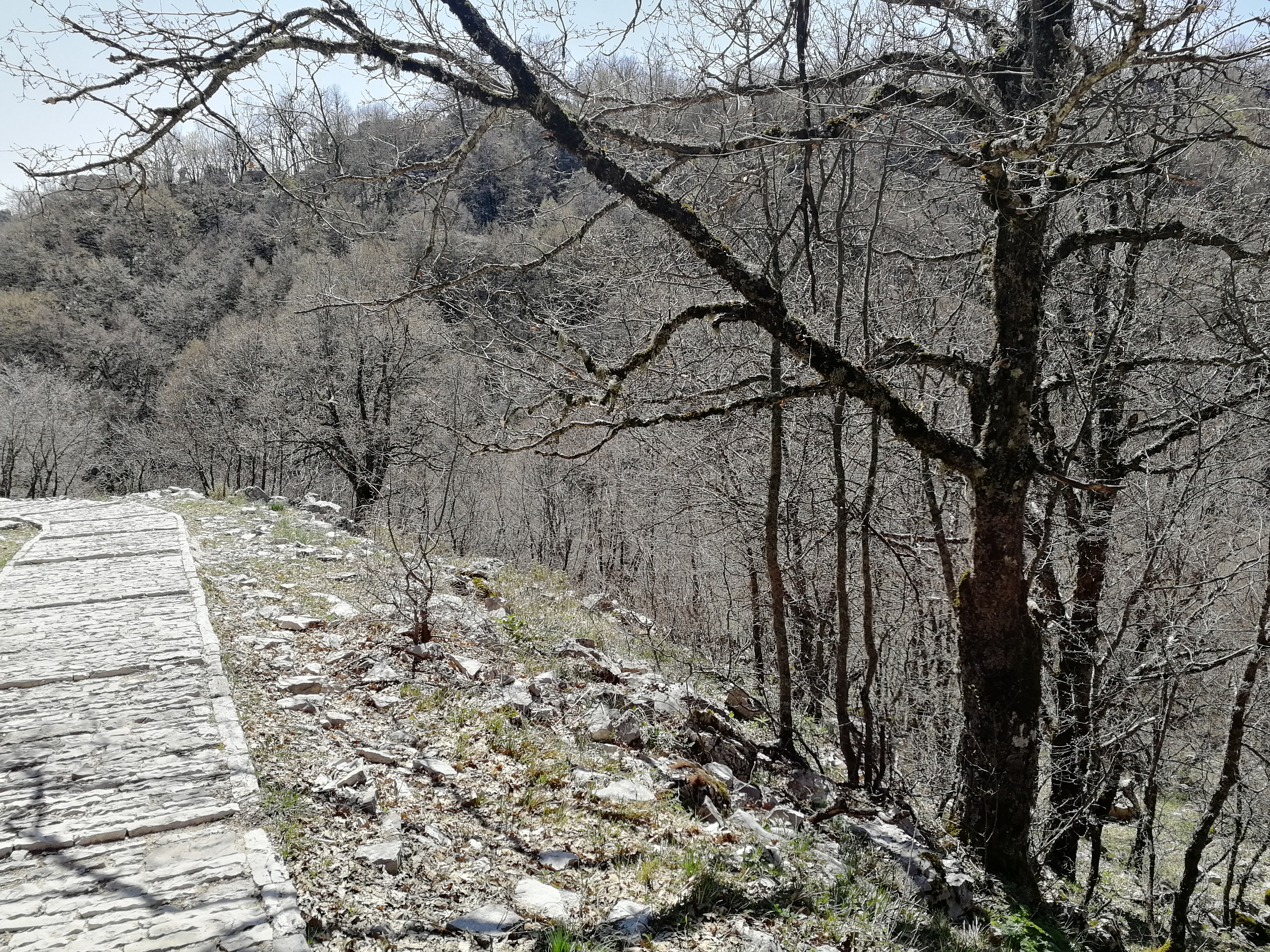
Trail that leads to Vikos Gorge.
