= Dilofo, Kozani =

Dilofo Δίλοφο
- Community
- Location within Greece
- Coordinates: 40°10′16″N 21°09′54″E
- Country: Greece
- Administrative region: Western Macedonia
- Regional unit: Kozani
- Municipality: Voio
- Municipal unit: Pentalofos

Population (2021)
  - Community: 11
- Time zone: UTC+2 (EET)
  - Summer (DST): UTC+3 (EEST)

Dilofo (Greek: Δίλοφο, before 1927: Λιμπόχοβο – Limpochovo, between 1927 and 1929: Βραχοπλαγιά – Vrachoplagia), is a small mountain village located in western Kozani regional unit, in Western Macedonia, Greece. It is part of the municipal unit Pentalofos.

== Attractions ==
- Church of the Koimesis (Dormition) of the Virgin
