= Kipoi, Ioannina =

Kipoi Κήποι
- Community
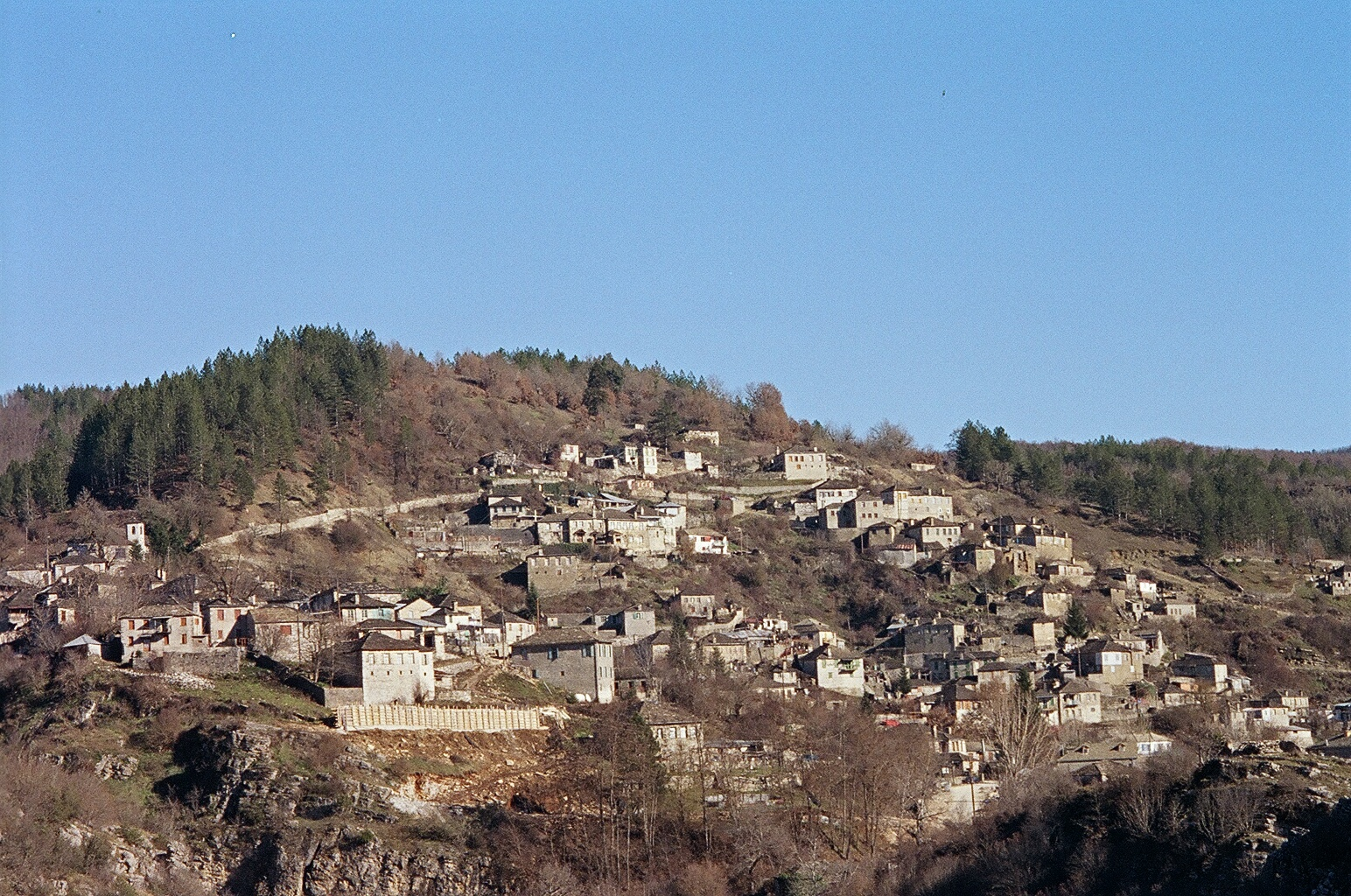

- Location within Greece
- Coordinates: 39°51.8′N 20°47.5′E
- Country: Greece
- Administrative region: Epirus
- Regional unit: Ioannina
- Municipality: Zagori
- Municipal unit: Tymfi

Population (2021)
  - Community: 96
- Time zone: UTC+2 (EET)
  - Summer (DST): UTC+3 (EEST)
- Vehicle registration: ΙΝ

Kipoi (Greek: Κήποι, before 1928: Μπάγια, Bagia) is a village in the region of Zagori. It belongs to the municipal unit of Tymfi, Ioannina regional unit, Greece. The village has the lowest altitude of all Zagori village and is surrounded by rivers. It is built on a rocky hill, in the southern end of Vikos Gorge.

== Name ==
The linguist Kostas Oikonomou wrote that the placename Bagia is related to the Albanian word bajë, baja 'bath', a term the philologist Franz Miklosich said cannot be attributed with certainty to any language. In contrast, the linguist Gustav Meyer connected the word to the Slavic banja 'bath' from the Romanian baje 'mine, bathing place, source of mineral water'.

Oikonomou stated the toponym originates either from the Albanian noun 'bathing place', as there are many ponds in the village suitable for bathing, especially in the summer when the river water ceases to flow and collects only in these ponds, or from the personal name Bagias (and Vagias), which are considered to be of Albanian origin. In the Zagori region, Albanian toponyms are among the few traces of a late medieval Albanian migration toward central and southern Greece.

The new Greek name Kipoi is taken from a nearby toponym for fields where potatoes and other agricultural crops are cultivated.

== History and culture ==
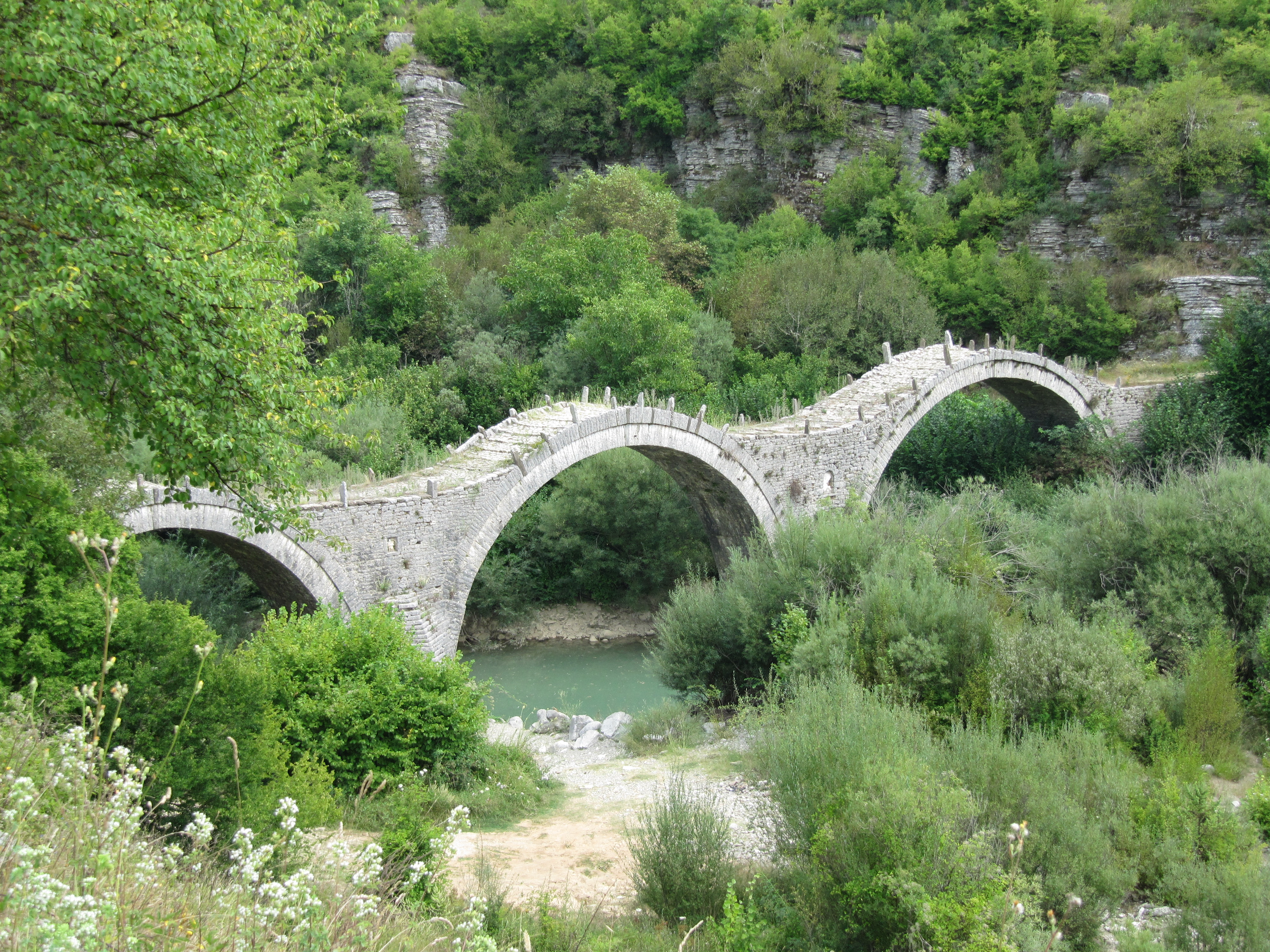
Plakidas' or Kalogeriko (monk's) bridge .

Kipoi was once the centre of Zagori. After the Balkan Wars and the liberation of Epirus in 1913, the people of Kipi demanded that Kipoi becomes the capital of Zagori, because it is the most central village and because it once was the "capital".

In Kipoi, the traditional architectural style of Epirus is well preserved, with stone built roads and dwellings. The village is surrounded by stone bridges. In the entrance lies Kontodimos bridge, down in the valley, the beautiful Milos bridge connects the village to the old water mill and Petsonis bridge in the exit towards Fragades.

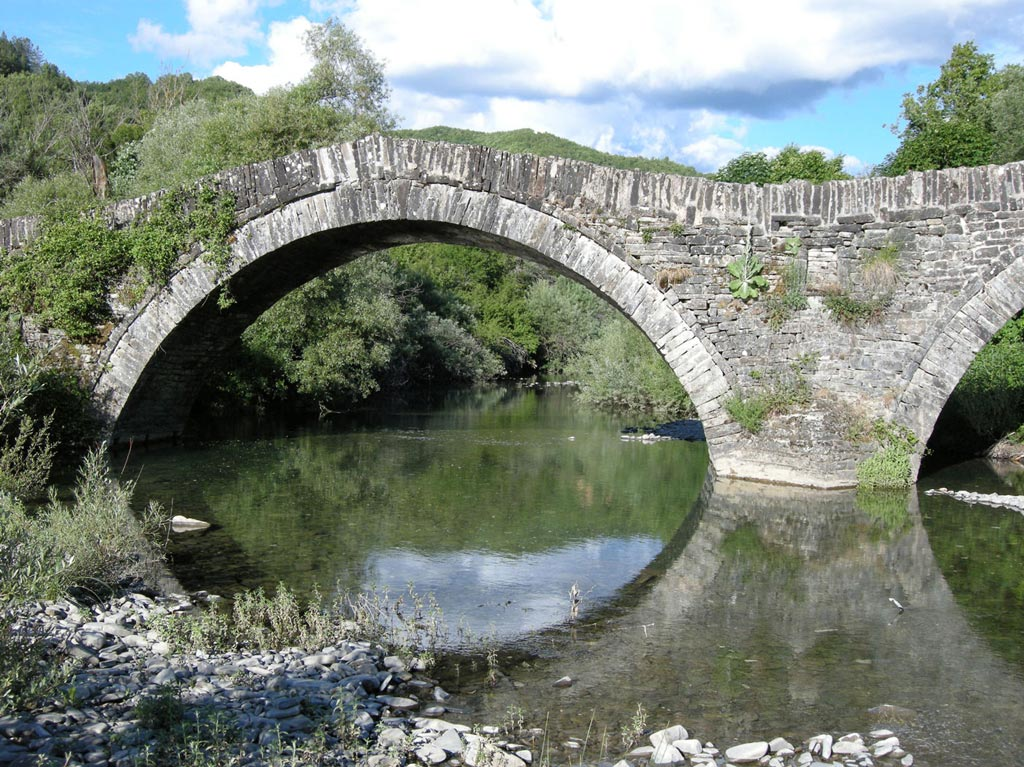
Milos bridge in Kipi village

One can find more bridges on the old paths towards Elati, Dikorfo, Negades and Tsepelovo. Not far from the villages lies a three arched stone bridge, of the 18th century (illustration). The bridge is also a unique tourist attraction of today, on the local road to central Zagori, just out of the village.

Today, the museum of the famous collector Agapios Tolis is located in Kipoi, where more than 40.000 exhibits are included.

== Demographics ==
The village is inhabited by Greeks, and an Aromanian community along with Arvanite families who both have assimilated into the local population. The arrival of Orthodox Albanians (locally called "Arvanites") occurred in the modern period and originate from the wider Souli area in central Greek Epirus.
