= Central Zagori =

Central Zagori Κεντρικό Ζαγόρι
- Municipal unit
- Location within the regional unit

- Location within Greece
- Coordinates: 39°52′N 20°42′E
- Country: Greece
- Administrative region: Epirus
- Regional unit: Ioannina
- Municipality: Zagori

Area
  - Municipal unit: 206.683 km^{2} (79.801 sq mi)

Population (2021)
  - Municipal unit: 1,059
  - Municipal unit density: 5.124/km^{2} (13.27/sq mi)
- Time zone: UTC+2 (EET)
  - Summer (DST): UTC+3 (EEST)
- Vehicle registration: ΙΝ

Central Zagori (Greek: Κεντρικό Ζαγόρι) is a former municipality in the Ioannina regional unit, Epirus, Greece. Since the 2011 local government reform, it has been part of the municipality Zagori, of which it is a municipal unit. The municipal unit has an area of 206.683 km^{2}. Its population was 1,059 in 2021. The seat of the municipal unit is in Asprangeloi.
