= Vikos–Aoös National Park =

National park in Epirus, Greece

Vikos-Aoös National Park
- IUCN category II (national park)
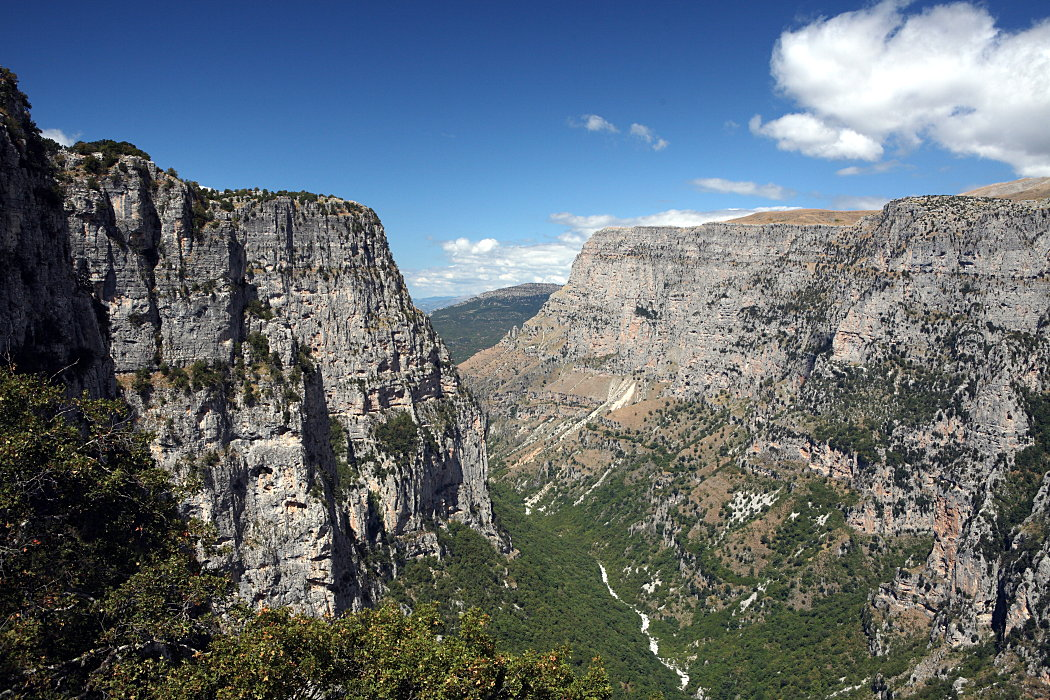
- Vikos Gorge from Oxia spot

- Location within Greece
- Interactive map of Vikos-Aoös National Park
- Location: Ioannina, Epirus, Greece
- Coordinates: 39°58′10″N 20°43′41″E
- Area: 12,600 ha (49 sq mi)
- Established: August 20, 1973
- Visitors: 100,000 per year
- Governing body: National Forest Department (Greek Ministry of Agriculture)

The Vikos–Aoös National Park (Greek: Εθνικός Δρυμός Βίκου–Αώου, romanized: Ethnikós Drymós Víkou–Aóou) is a national park in the region of Epirus in northwestern Greece. The park, founded in 1973, is one of ten national parks in mainland Greece and is located 30 kilometres (19 mi) north of the city of Ioannina in the northern part of the Pindus mountain range. It is named after the two major gorges of the area and encompasses 12,600 hectares (31,135 acres) of mountainous terrain, with numerous rivers, lakes, caves, deep canyons, dense coniferous and deciduous forest. The park is part of the Natura 2000 ecological network and one of UNESCO Geoparks and spans an elevation range from 550 to 2,497 meters (1,804 to 8,192 ft). Over 100,000 people visit the park each year and take part in activities including rafting, canoe-kayaking, hiking and mountain biking.

The core of the park, an area of 3,400 hectares (8,402 acres), comprises the spectacular Vikos Gorge, carved by the Voidomatis river. The gorge's main part is 12 km (7 mi) long, which attains a depth of 1,000 meters (3,300 ft), and has a width ranging from 2500 m to only a few meters at its narrowest part. The Aoös gorge, Mt Tymphe (2,497 meters (8,192 ft) at Gamila peak), and a number of traditionally preserved settlements form the park's peripheral zone. The park's remoteness and relatively small human population, combined with the great variation of biotopes and microclimatic conditions favors the existence of a rich variety of flora (1,800 species) in the area. Vikos–Aoös National Park supports a wide diversity of fauna, with a plethora of large mammals such as the brown bear, for which the park is one of the last European strongholds, and a variety of natural habitats and ecosystems that rank it among the most valuable parks for nature conservation in Greece.

The first evidence of human presence in the area is dated between 17,000 and 10,000 years ago. The area of the park has been sparsely populated throughout historical times, however from the 17th to the 19th century the local communities of Zagori acquired an autonomous status, flourished economically due to increased trade, and became a major center of folk medicine. In recent decades, ecotourism is seen as a remedy to the economic decline of heavily depopulated local settlements, while preserving the natural environment and local architecture.

== Geography and geology ==
=== Vikos Gorge ===
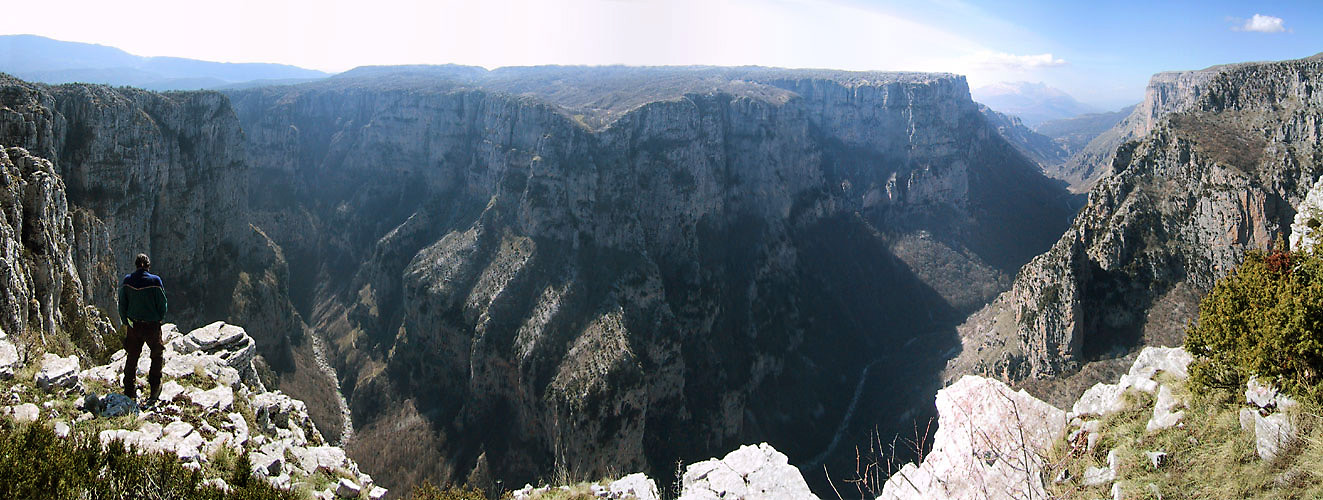
Panoramic view of Vikos Gorge

The Vikos Gorge is located on the southern slopes of Mt Tymphe. Its main part is located between the villages of Vikos and Monodendri and attains a depth of about 1,000 m (3,281 ft), with a southeast–northwest direction. The landscape of the 20 km (12 mi) long gorge, 12 km (7 mi) which belongs to the park's core zone, presents a diverse relief and is characterized by abrupt changes in altitude. At one point the gorge measures 900 m (2,953 ft) deep and 1,100 m (3,609 ft) wide from rim to rim, and as a result is listed by the Guinness Book of Records as the deepest canyon in the world in proportion to its width, though some gorge lobbyists contest that claim. Steep slopes and precipitous rocky cliffs dominate in the middle and higher zones respectively. Numerous gullies dissect both sides of the gorge and the weathering action of water down its walls creates extended screes.

The Vikos Gorge has been carved over millions of years by the Voidomatis river, a tributary of the Aoös. The Voidomatis is mostly seasonal, with year-round flow occurring only in the lower part of the gorge. Due to its nature, the area of the gorge is precipitous and impassable most of the year.

As the Vikos Gorge is a deep cross section of the mountain, its slopes expose a series of rock formations of various ages. The upper layers, at a depth of 0–200 m (660 ft), consist of relatively young Eocene limestone, at a depth of 200 m (660 ft)–700 m (2,300 ft) they consist of a stratum from the Campanian era, while below 700 m (2,300 ft) they consist of Jurassic and Cretaceous limestone. In the deepest layers, grey Jurassic dolomite is dominant. Sedimentary and lithological investigation in the Voidomatis basin revealed that the innermost alluvial deposits consist of limestone-derived material, carried by the Voidomatis river from higher elevations by glacial action about 30,000 years ago. The subsequent (middle) deposits are the product of de-glaciation and the extended run-off from the uplands about 20,000 years ago, while the outer unit is attributed to human activities associated with pastoralism, which caused extended deforestation and soil erosion. The Voidomatis basin contains evidence for three major phases of glaciation, with the two largest and earliest taking place during the Middle Pleistocene. The final phase of glacial activity probably occurred during the Last Glacial Maximum, between 22,000 and 20,000 ago.

A special feature of the limestone, resulting from its weathering by water, is its karstic nature. During the large Middle Pleistocene glaciations, surface runoff from glacial meltwaters would have fed directly into the river channel network because much of the upland limestone terrain was covered by ice, and many conduits in the karst would have been choked with sediment or permanently frozen. As a result, the glacier snouts came close to the modern valley bottoms. In contrast, during interglacial and interstadial periods, more effective coupling occurred between the surface drainage network and the internal karst drainage system. Since limestone dissolves as the water percolates through its pores, an extended underground drainage system has developed, with caves and channels that enlarge with time when their roofs collapse, producing rocky exposures and perpendicular slopes, which is also the reason why the water is scarce. Only when an impenetrable stratum is met, does water appear on the surface.

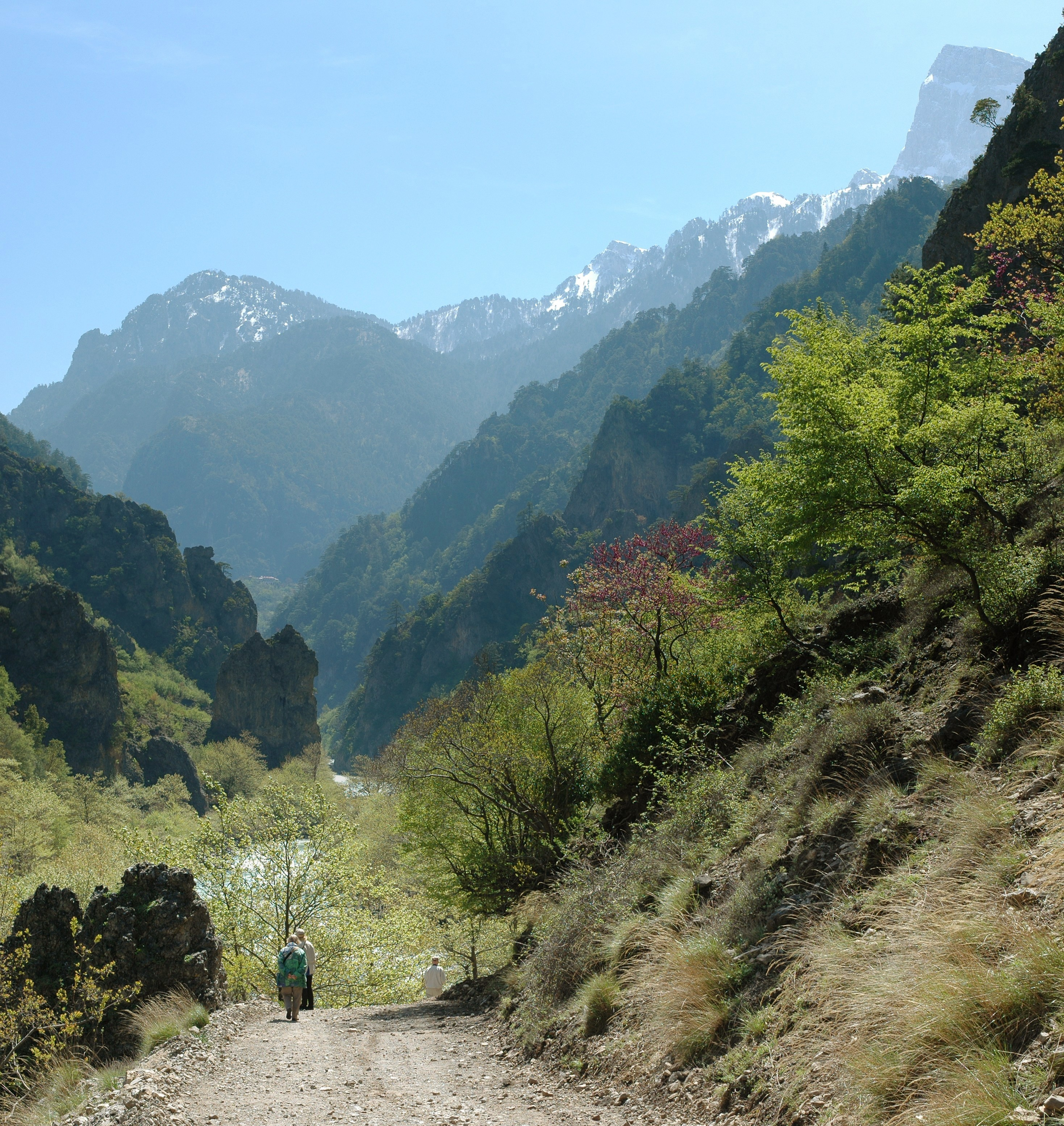
The Aoos Gorge, with Mt Tymphe in the background

=== Aoös Gorge ===
In the northern part of the Park, and very close to the town of Konitsa, the Aoös river passes through channels formed by the bulges of the nearby mountains of Trapezitsa 2,022 m (6,634 ft), Mt Tymphe and Raidovouni 1,957 m (6,421 ft), creating the Aoös Gorge that is 10 km (6 mi) long. It has an east–west direction and features numerous stone single-arched bridges from the 17th to 19th centuries, as well as monasteries built in the local architectural style. It is characterized by the great number of secondary gullies and currents, while the southern part of the gorge is steeper than the northern part. Deep and steep ravines within the perpendicular walls carry down into the Aoös large quantities of material resulting from limestone-weathering. The compact dolomites that lie on the bottom of the gorge date to the Early Jurassic period and are the oldest rock formations in the Park. Their age has been determined by means of sea fossils found inside them.

=== Mt Tymphe ===
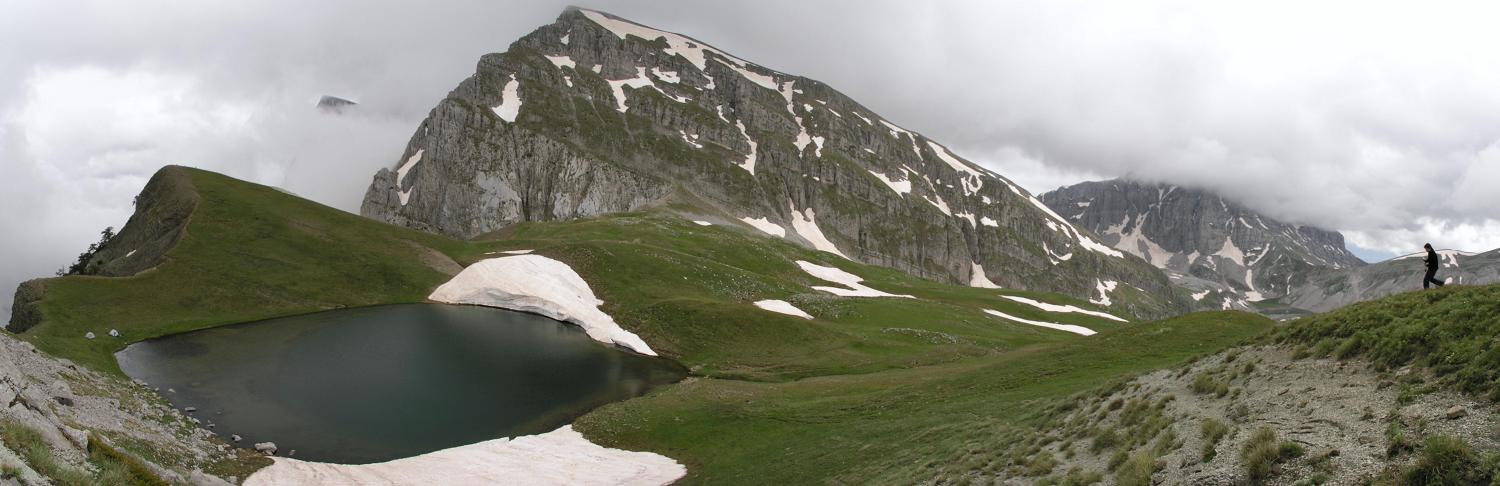
Drakolimni (Dragonlake), overlooked by Ploskos (center) and Astraka (right) peaks

Between the two gorges lies the Tymphe mountain range. Its highest peaks are Gamila 2,497 m (8,192 ft), Astraka 2,436 m (7,992 ft), Ploskos 2,400 m (7,874 ft), and Lapatos 2,251 m (7,385 ft). A unique feature of this area is natural pools formed by the erosion of local stream beds. A number of alpine lakes are found in the high-altitude zone of Mt Tymphe, surrounded by alpine pasture, which are home to several rare amphibian species. The biggest lake of the National Park, Drakolimni ("Dragonlake"), a formation that was created after the retreat of the glaciers, is located at a height of 2,000 m (6,562 ft) on Mt Tymphe. Its maximum depth is 4.95 m (16 ft), while its surface covers 1 ha (2 acres).

A number of vertical caves and precipices are found in the area around the village of Papingo, which lies near the Gamila and Astraka peaks. Some of them bear names inspired from mythology, such as the Hole of Odysseus and Chasm of Epos. These are being studied and explored by caving enthusiasts. The cave of "Provatina" ("Ewe's Cave"), with a depth of 408 m (1,339 ft), one of the deepest worldwide, was first discovered in 1965 by British speleologists of the Cambridge University Caving Club, and has since then been surveyed by a large number of expeditions. The nearby Chasm of Epos, with a depth of 451 m (1,480 ft), drains the water coming from the surrounding plateaus.

Mt Tymphe represents a series of uplifted fault blocks and faulted escarpments and is largely composed of Palaeocene-Eocene limestone, with some exposures of Campanian-Jurassic dolomite and limestone on the northern scarp. The lower slopes are dominated by younger flysch rocks, which consist of thin beds of graded sandstones intercalated with softer, fissile siltstones. Extended glacial conditions prevailed on the uplands of Mt Tymphe during the Late Quaternary period, ca. 28,000 years ago. The glacial landscape is well-developed, especially on the southern slopes of Mt Tymphe, across the Astraka-Gamila plateau, and in the upland terrain above the villages of Skamneli and Tsepelovo, where lateral and terminal moraines form major landscape features. Additional forms of glacial deposits, which extend down to 850 m (2,789 ft) above sea level, include rock glaciers and limestone pavements.

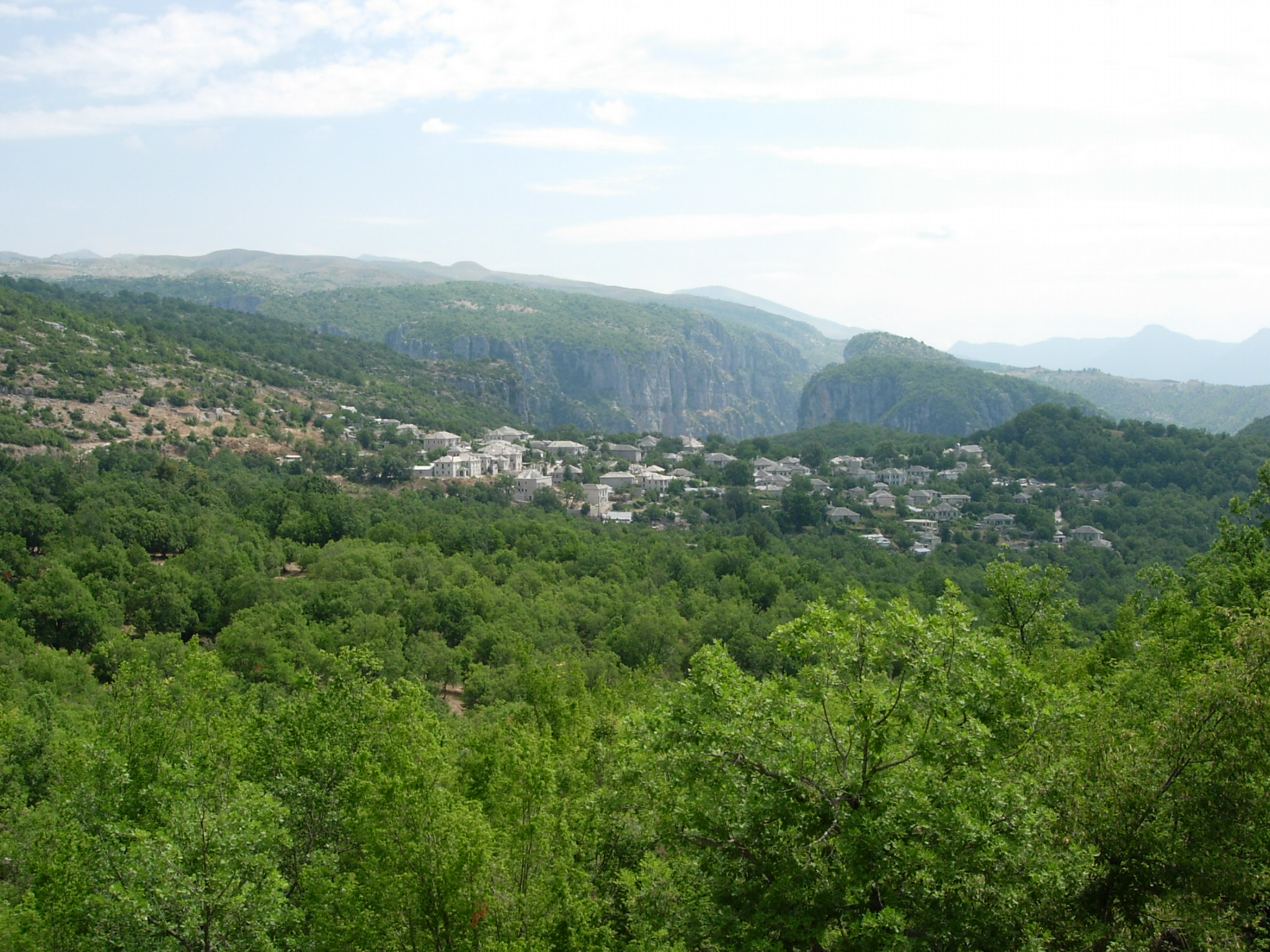
The village of Monodendri, in dense vegetation. Part of the Vikos Gorge is visible in the background

=== Settlements ===
There are four villages inside the Vikos–Aoös National Park, and an additional nine near the borders of the peripheral zone. All of these settlements, in the western part of the Zagori region, are sparsely populated with a total population of 1,515 people. The villages have a nucleus-like form, with the houses situated around the central square and interconnected by pathways paved by slate or cobblestone. Historically, all the villages of the Zagori region were connected by a system of paths or small roads and they functioned more like a single entity rather than as separate communities.

The economic affluence of Zagori's past is still reflected in the architecture of the villages, while today the preservation of the local architectural legacy is enshrined in a law which dictates that all buildings in the area must be constructed with local traditional materials and in compliance with local architecture. One of the characteristic features of the National Park is its stone bridges, which were the only connection to the outside world until roads were built in the 1950s. Sixteen of these stone bridges and seven churches in the region have been listed as protected historical monuments.

== Climate ==
The climate of the Vikos–Aoös National Park is Mediterranean, transitioning to continental. The Mediterranean character is characterized by the annual distribution of precipitation, high in the winter months and experiencing a drought period of two to three months in summer. The continental climatic element is attributed to the high amplitude of annual temperature variation, to such a degree that the difference between mean maximum and mean minimum annual temperature, exceeds 40 °C (104 °F). The climate of the area is quite unique due to the complex relief, variation in altitude, and the position of the area with regard to the Ionian Sea coastline. The mean annual temperature and annual precipitation are 11.9 °C (53 °F) and 1,100.9 mm (43.34 in) respectively. Extremely low temperatures occur in the area during the winter months. Compared to Mediterranean bioclimatic divisions, the area belongs to the humid zone with cold winters.

Climate data for Vikos–Aoös National Park
Month	Jan	Feb	Mar	Apr	May	Jun	Jul	Aug	Sep	Oct	Nov	Dec	Year
Daily mean °C (°F)	3.7 (38.7)	4.0 (39.2)	6.1 (43.0)	9.0 (48.2)	15.4 (59.7)	18.7 (65.7)	22.0 (71.6)	21.1 (70.0)	18.1 (64.6)	12.3 (54.1)	7.8 (46.0)	4.5 (40.1)	11.9 (53.4)
Average precipitation mm (inches)	110.4 (4.35)	108.3 (4.26)	89.4 (3.52)	108.9 (4.29)	68.8 (2.71)	52.4 (2.06)	36.9 (1.45)	36.7 (1.44)	60.1 (2.37)	128.8 (5.07)	156.8 (6.17)	143.4 (5.65)	1,100.9 (43.34)

== Wildlife ==
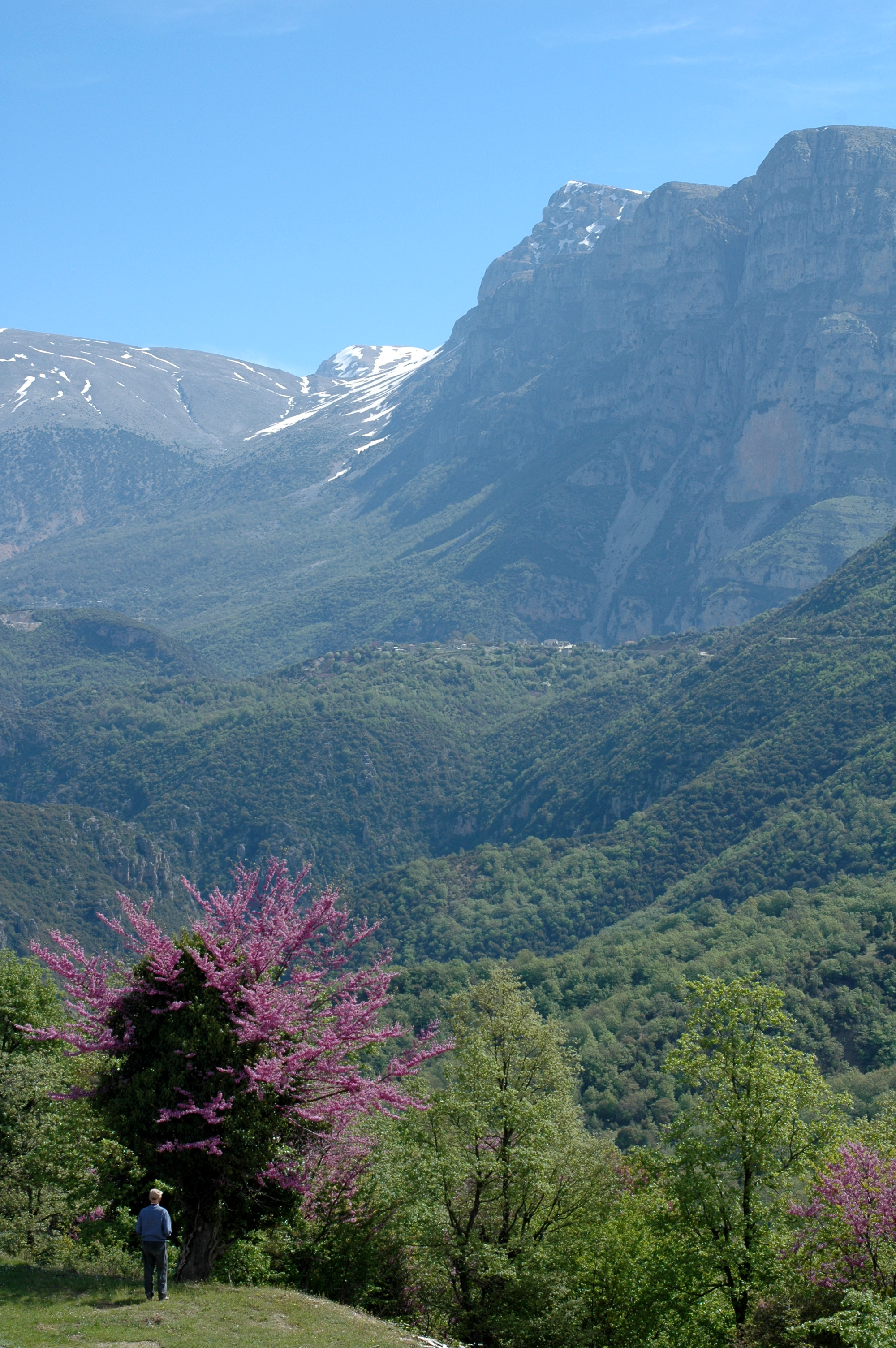
The village of Vikos (center), in dense vegetation lying below Astraka peak

The park's varied geology and topography have resulted in a unique variety of flora and fauna. There are three main habitat zones: (1) Sub-mediterranean woodland which mainly consists of deciduous broadleaf forests and woodlands and extends up to an elevation of about 1,500 m (4,921 ft). (2) Combined areas of agricultural land with tree hedges and various woodlots, in addition to semi-open shrublands and rocky sites of the lower and middle slopes near human settlements. (3) Uplands with subalpine grasslands and rocky cliffs. This habitat is found above 1,500 m (4,921 ft) altitude and hosts rare bird species such as the Mediterranean golden eagle.

=== Flora ===
The forests are composed of diverse species of deciduous and coniferous trees and a great variety of wildflowers. An important element of the region's flora, apart from the rich variety of plant species, is the high degree of endemism in Balkan (23%) and Greek species (5.8%). Recent studies on the flora of the National Park counted 873 vascular plants, including more than 250 medicinal, aromatic, and poisonous taxa. The park's forests are abundant in species associated with the cool local climate, such as Wych Elm, Nettle-leaved Bellflower, Horse-chestnut and Large-leaved Linden. In the valley of the Vikos Gorge, Platanus orientalis form an azonal gallery forest along the banks of the Voidomatis. The woodland in the mountain area around the village of Papingo is characterized by the predominance of different juniper species, such as Juniperus communis, foetidissima, oxycedrus and excelsa. In the upper hills Juniperus foetidissima dominates, with exceptionally high (more than 10 m (33 ft)) trees. At higher altitudes, pure conifer forests of either pine or fir are found.

Studies on the non-vascular flora recorded the presence of about 150 moss species in the area of the national park, including one newly described taxon. Many herbs of the Vikos Gorge and other areas within the park were regarded to have medicinal properties and were once harvested by local healers, colloquially referred to as "Vikos doctors" (Greek: Βικογιατροί, "Vikoiatri"). These herbal healers used special recipes that were often copies of ancient Greek recipes of Hippocrates or Dioscorides and became famous beyond the borders of Greece. The plants used in these recipes include the lemon balm Melissa officinalis, Tilia tomentosa, the spearmint Mentha spicata, the gas-plant Dictamnus albus, St John's Wort Hypericum perforatum, absinth Artemisia absinthium, the very popular Sideritis raeseri, known colloquially in Greece as “mountain tea”, and the elder bush Sambucus nigra. A chemical screening of these native plant species has shown that a high number of them are characterized by biologically active ingredients. A collection of 2,500 dried species of local plants and herbs is exhibited in the local natural history museum in the village of Koukouli.

=== Fauna ===
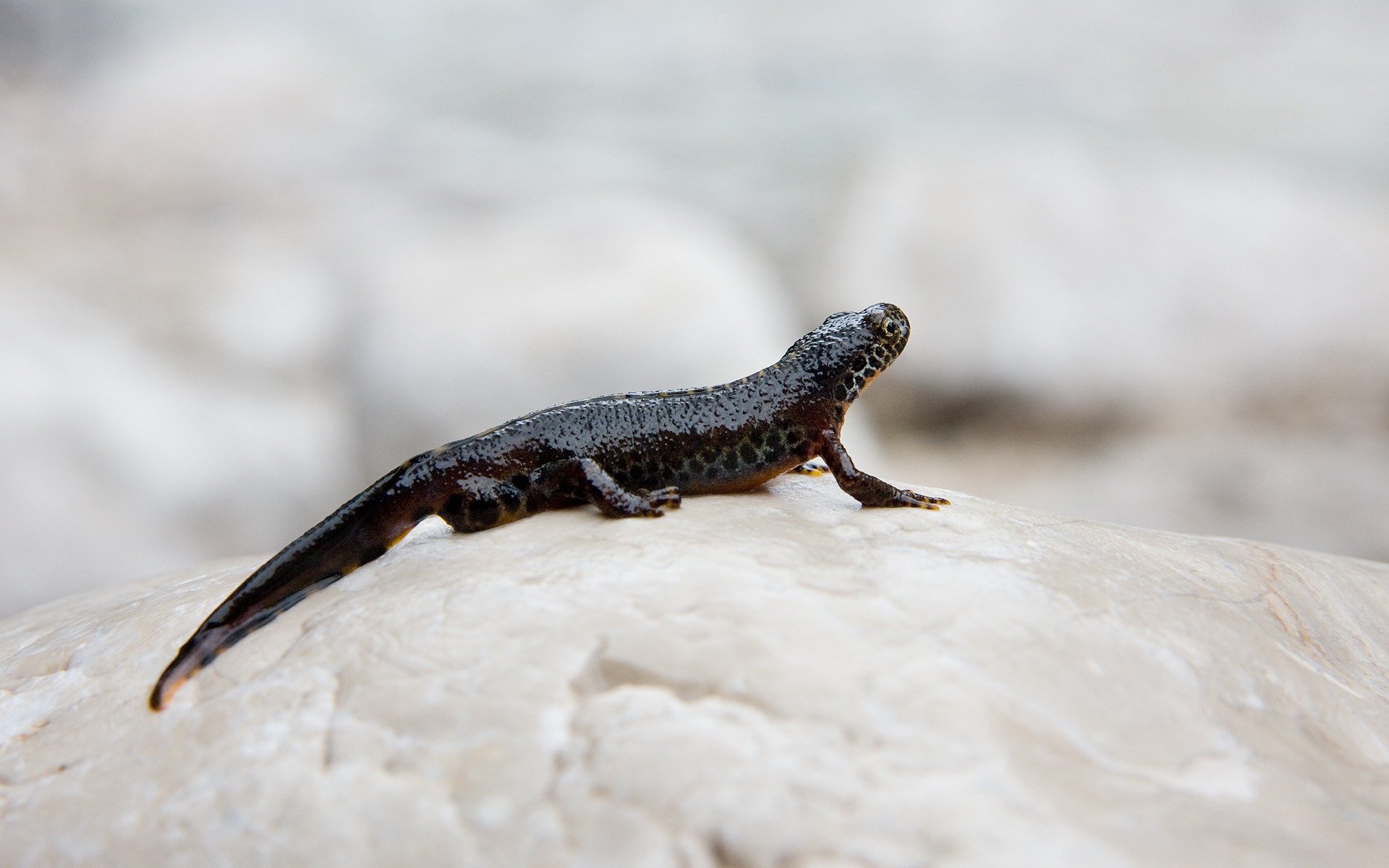
The alpine newt (Ichthyosaura alpestris). Its presence is associated with local folktales about dragons.

The Vikos–Aoös National Park preserves one of the richest mountain and forest ecosystems in terms of wildlife diversity in Greece. Numerous species of large mammals such as wolves, foxes, wild horses, and roe deer are found in the area year-round. Otters and wild cats live around the area of Mt Tymphe, with the latter being quite rare. The Pindus range, of which Vikos–Aoös is part, is home to the endangered brown bear and lynx, and is also the southernmost point of their European habitat. One of the park's special attractions is the existence of the chamois (Rupicapra rupicapra), a rare species that lives at higher altitudes far from human activity, especially on the rocky cliffsides of the gorges, for example in Megas Lakos, a secondary ravine of the Vikos Gorge.

A total of 121 bird species have been observed in the park, with twenty-six of them being considered of conservation priority. The area hosts fifteen raptor species and populations of bird species with limited distribution in Greece, such as the hazel grouse, Tengmalm's owl, wallcreeper and willow tit. Two bird communities that inhabit the subalpine and forest ecosystems are considered among the most complete in Greece: The first community includes species that nest and feed in the subalpine area, like the alpine chough, shore lark, western rock nuthatch and alpine swift, while the second comprises birds of prey like the griffon vulture, Egyptian vulture, peregrine falcon and common kestrel, that search for food in a wider zone.

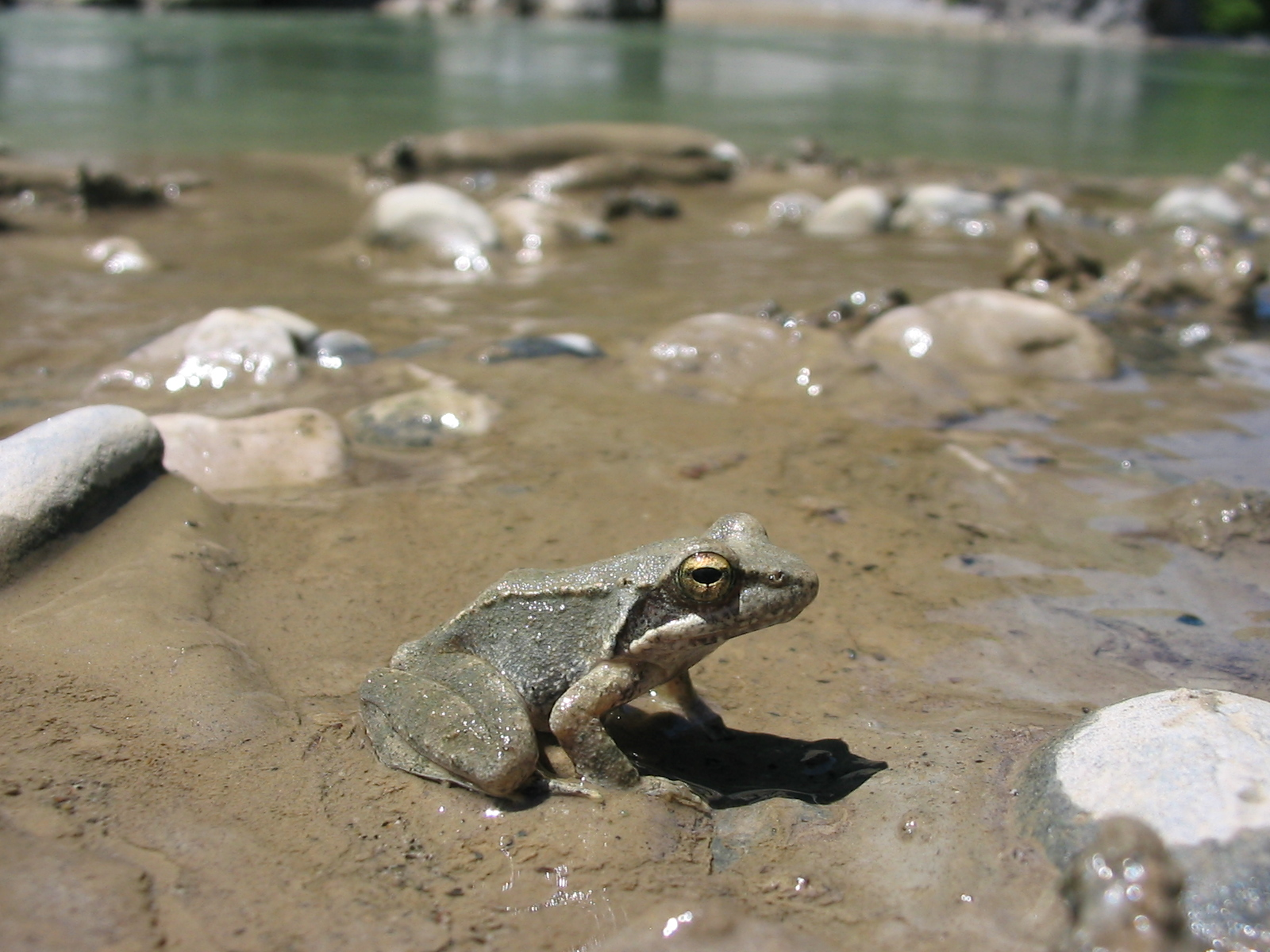
A tiny frog in the river Aoos

The Vikos-Aoös area also contains a variety of suitable habitats that support dense populations of amphibians and reptiles. Vipera ursinii lives in the subalpine meadows and is considered a threatened taxon. The amphibian alpine newts (Triturus alpestris), living in the alpine lakes of the Tymphe region, mostly in Drakolimni, are associated with local folktales of dragons and dragon battles. Yellow-bellied toads (Bombina variegata) are also common in that same area. Numerous fish, such as brown trout, roach, and barbel are to be found in the park's rivers. Regarding invertebrate species, due to the structural complexity of the forests and the close proximity of various small biotopes, i.e. streams, ponds, forest openings, rocky sites, dead trees, old pollards, and coppices, a very diverse fauna exists, especially at the various ecotones, which often includes very specialized species.

== Human history ==
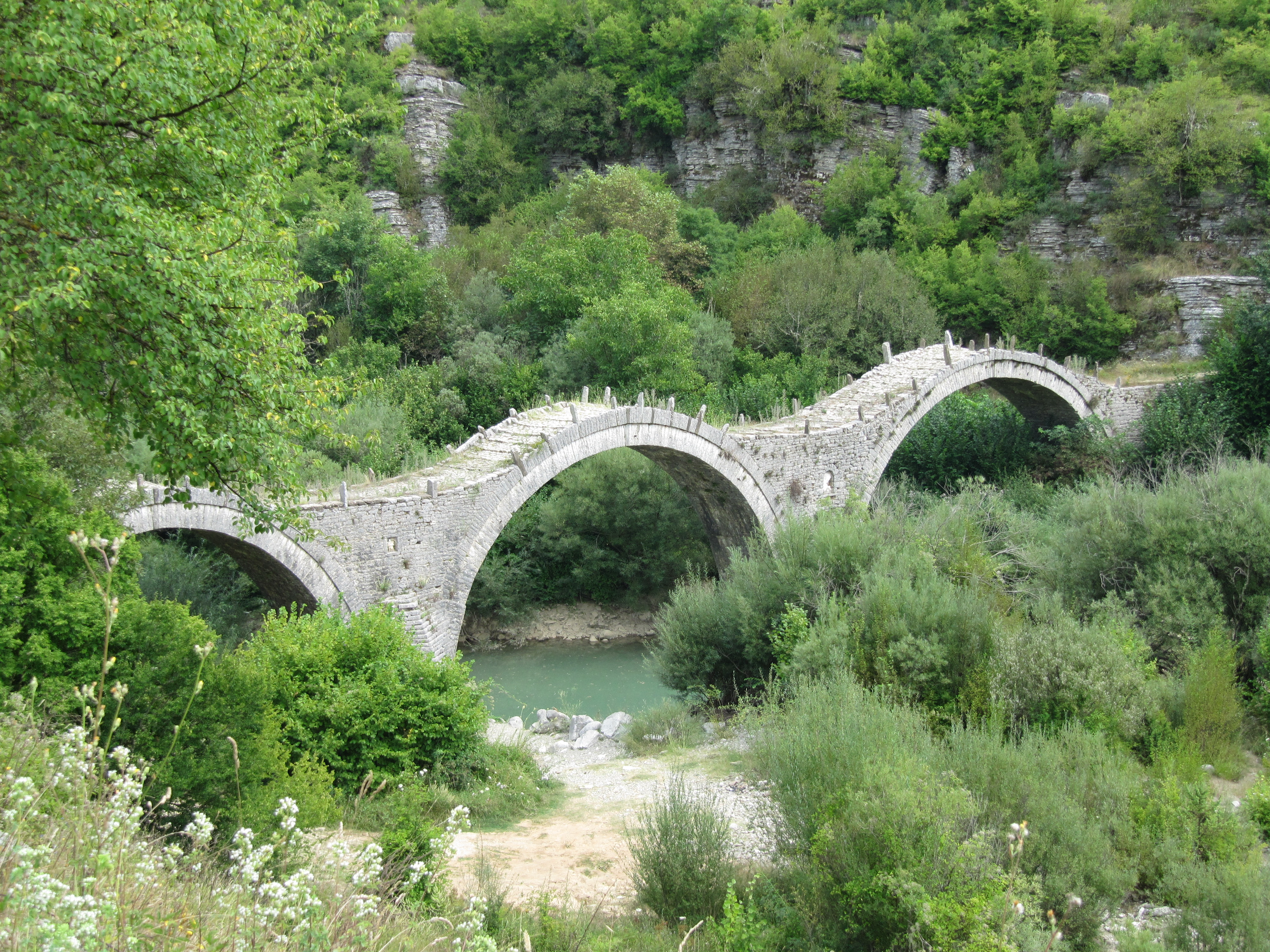
Plakidas bridge, a three arched stone bridge near the village of Kipoi

The first evidence of human presence in the area is dated to between 17,000 and 10,000 years ago. During this period, favorable climatic conditions prevailed that permitted the hunting of the ibex and the chamois on a seasonal basis. Important epipaleolithic artifacts have been unearthed from a rock shelter on the banks of the Voidomatis. During the 9th–4th centuries B.C., a small Molossian settlement existed between Monodendri and Vitsa, including stone houses and two cemeteries that have yielded important findings. However, for most of the historical period the local population was sparse. The land was mainly used for pastoralism and supplying firewood.

In the era of Ottoman rule, and especially from the 17th to the 19th century, the local Greek Orthodox communities were granted special privileges by the Ottoman authorities. At that time the area of Zagori acquired an autonomous status inside the Ottoman Empire, whereby the locals were exempt from the heavy taxation that affected the lowland communities. During this period large groups of villagers emigrated to metropolitan centers. Many among them became members of successful professional classes before finally returning to their home villages, endowing the region with wealth and building luxurious mansions. In such an environment, the art of herbal healing by the so-called Vikos doctors developed and flourished. This was accompanied by an impressive cultural and intellectual life that produced many renowned scholars and benefactors of Greece.

The area is nowadays sparsely populated as the result of urbanization after World War II. Many of the dwellings now remain shut, while abandonment of the traditional rural economy has affected the cultural landscape. Epirus, of which Vikos–Aoös is part, is considered one of the most underdeveloped regions in Greece. Tourism constitutes the principal source of revenue for the local economy, although it has a highly seasonal character. Intense development in terms of accommodation and tourism infrastructure occurred in the 1980s, mainly through state initiatives.

== Park management ==
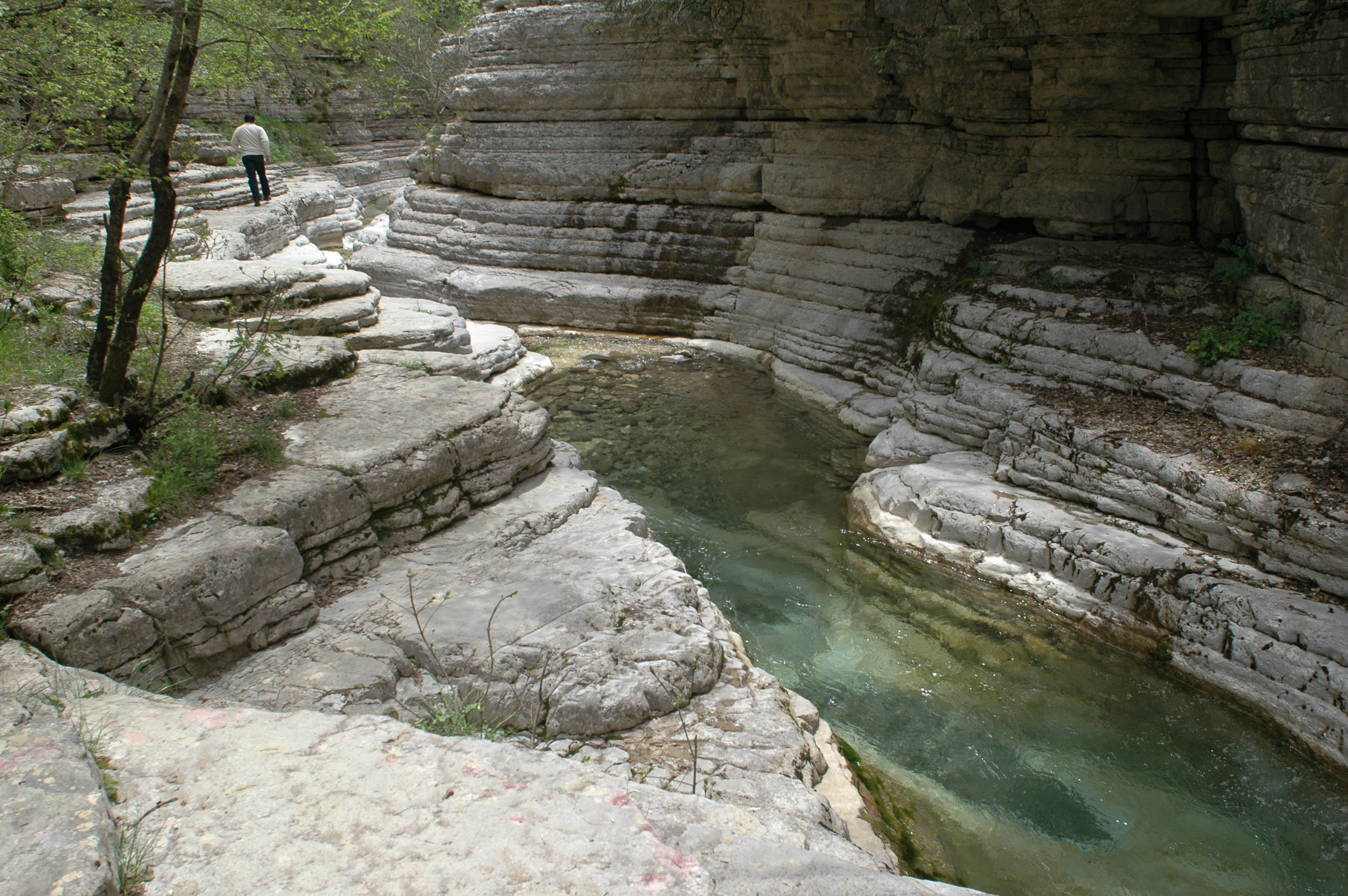
Natural pools near Papingo

The Vikos–Aoös area was designated as a National Park in 1973, in an effort by the Greek Government to conserve the richness of the local fauna and flora and the geological formations of the area.

The administration and management of the Vikos–Aoös National Park belongs to two district forest offices, supervised by a forest directorate at the prefecture level. Moreover, the office of World Wide Fund for Nature (WWF) in the village of Papingo plays an essential role in management issues. Apart from government efforts, incentives have been given to local management organizations and the local population to participate in the protection of the park. Forestry activities, grazing, hunting, and fishing are prohibited by law in the park's core. There are no such restrictions in the peripheral zone but the Forest Service can take any necessary measure for the realization of the aims of the park. Apart from the above-mentioned activities, dangers to the park include land erosion, landslides, and wildfires which threaten the local flora and fauna. Another issue is the impact of tourism in recent decades. On the other hand, extreme geophysical conditions make the construction and maintenance of the necessary infrastructure network, mainly access routes and telecommunications, difficult.

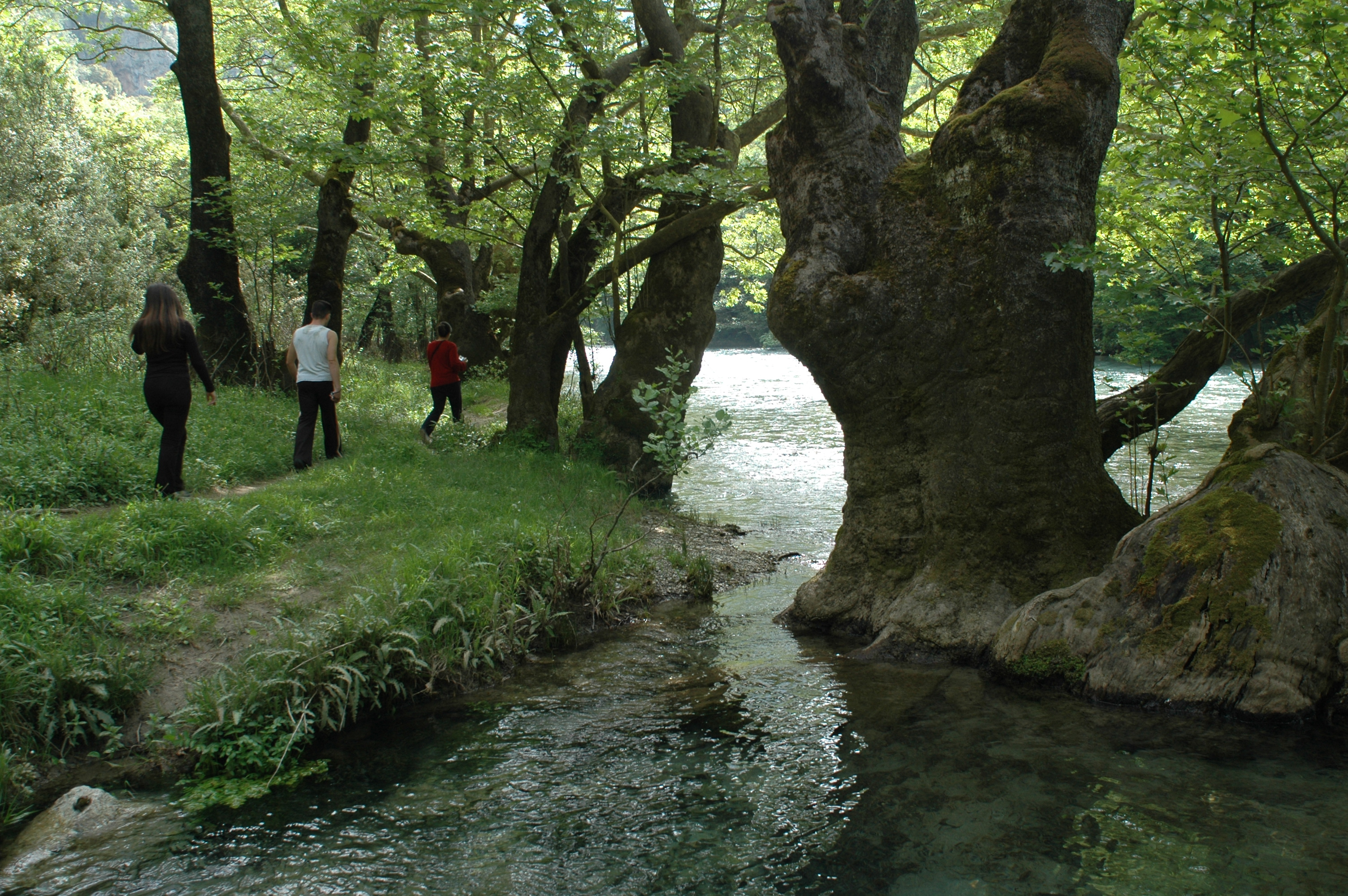
Hikers walking along the Voidomatis river

The vast area of the National Park and the present lack of road infrastructure make remote sensing the only means for monitoring the human activities in the area and their impact on the ecosystem. An analysis has begun by taking a detailed picture of the territory covering at least the following items: orography and slopes, road networks, land cover and use, human settlements, and tourist sites. The use of remote sensing and geographic information system techniques is of essential value for the park's management and constitutes the basis for further evaluations and impact analysis.

The objective of the present state and regional policy is to carefully combine tourism development in the area with the preservation of its natural and cultural heritage. Ecotourism poses an ideal solution, since it has the potential of bringing about the desired balance between socio-economic development and environmental protection. Specific objectives of ecotourism development include reviving traditional activities such as small-scale farming and stock-raising, as well as establishing a network of communities of chamois biotopes.

== Recreation ==
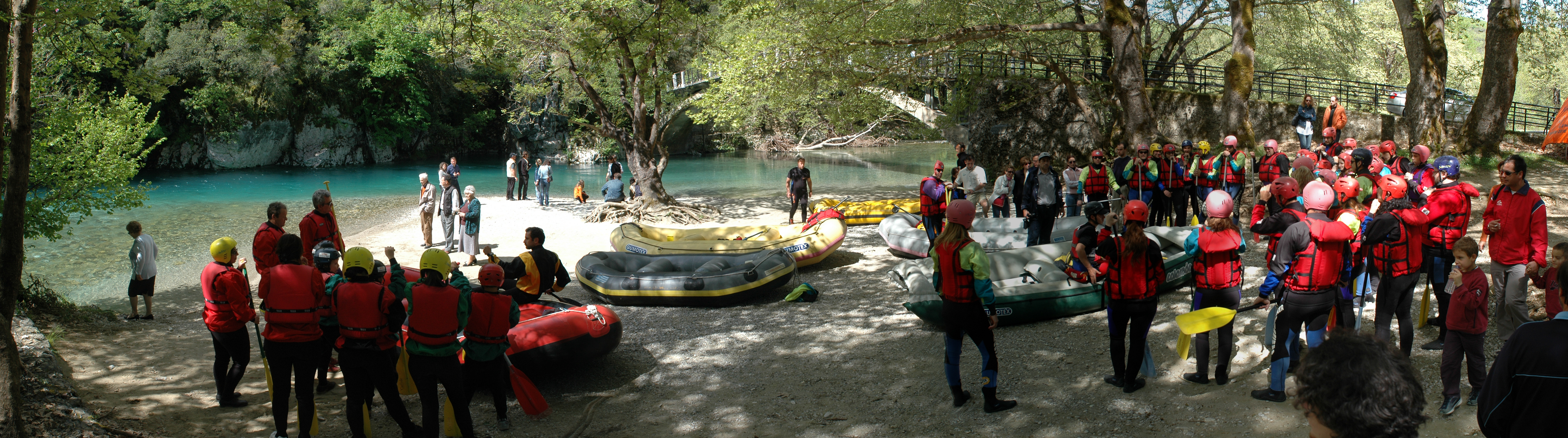
Rafters on the bank of the Voidomatis

The Vikos–Aoös National Park is a natural tourist attraction, with high ecotourism and agrotourism potential. The local tourism industry has been favored by national and European funds and provides modest accommodation and tourism services, respectful towards the local tradition and culture. Characteristically, the Federation of Nature and National Parks of Europe (FNNPE) stated that "the need for a sustainable form of tourism has never been greater in the area".

The rivers in the Vikos–Aoös area are a destination for rafting and canoe-kayaking enthusiasts. Additional forms of adventure sports include climbing, hiking and mountain biking along local paths in order to observe the area's natural features and architecture. Popular trails in the region include the crossing of the Vikos Gorge, which lasts approximately six to seven hours and is considered of medium difficulty, as well as hiking around the peaks of Mt Tymphe. Several lookouts that offer panoramic views of the Vikos Gorge, such as the Oxya and Beloe lookouts and the 15th century Monastery of Saint Paraskevi, are accessible only by foot.

== Gallery ==
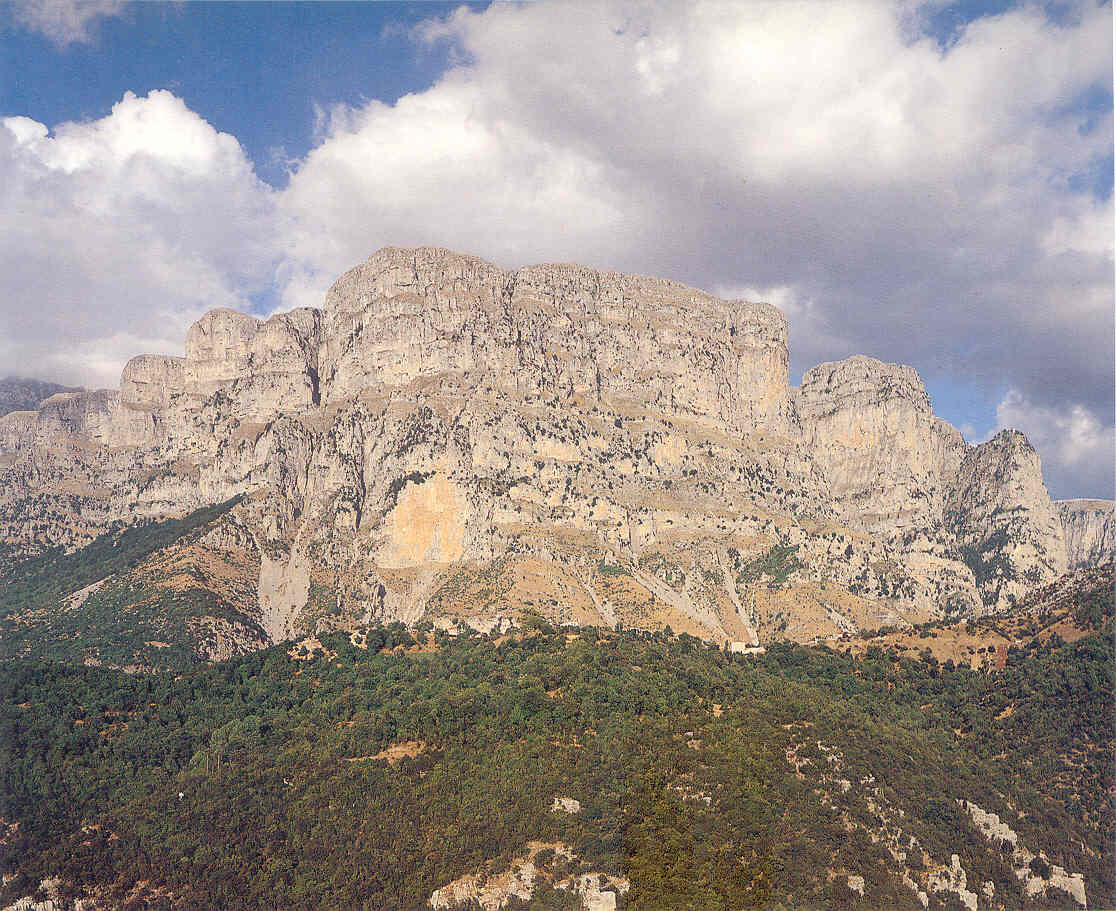
Astraka peak (known as 'Astraka towers') over the village Mikro Papingo

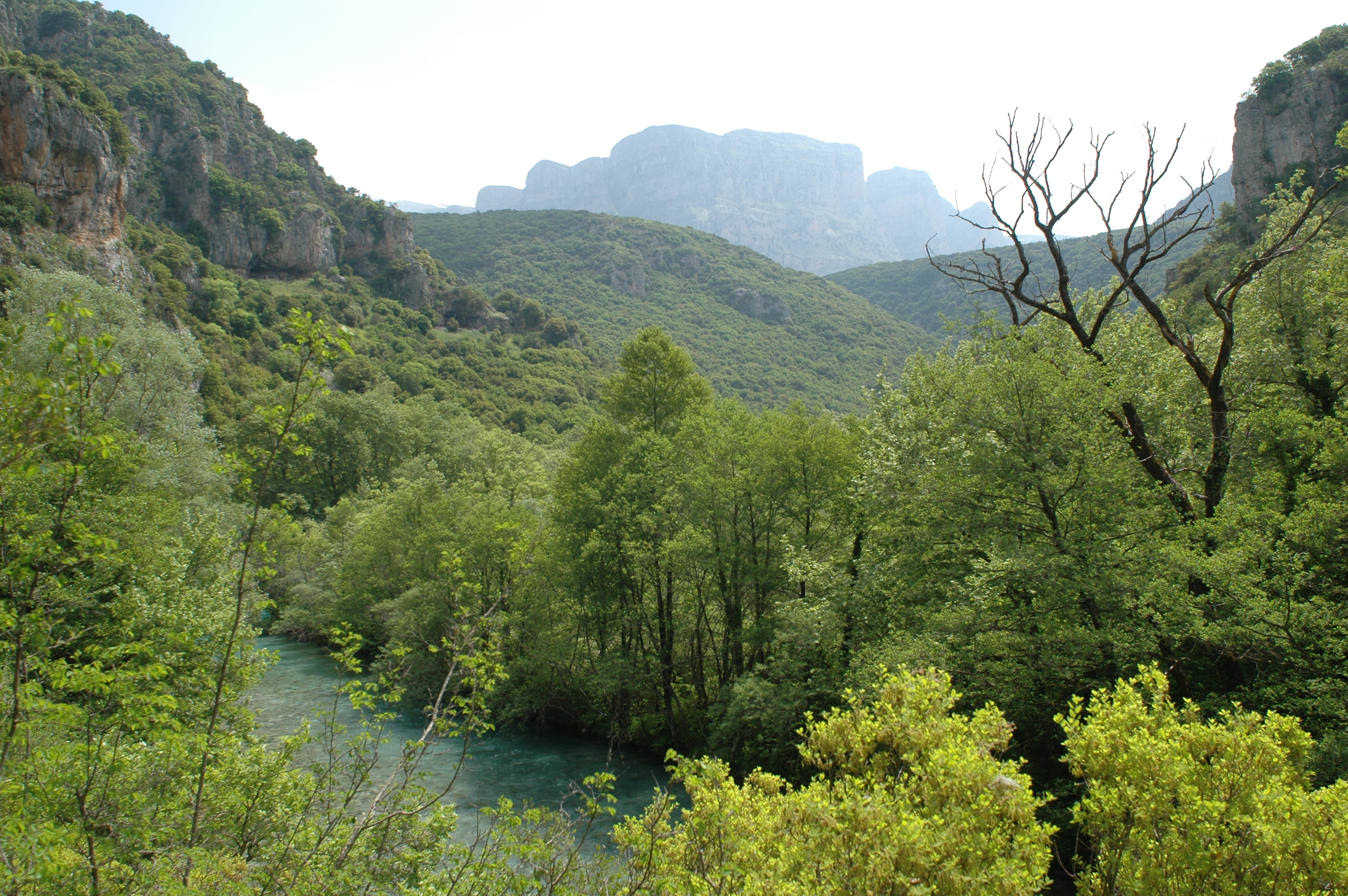
The Voidomatis river with Astraka peak in the background

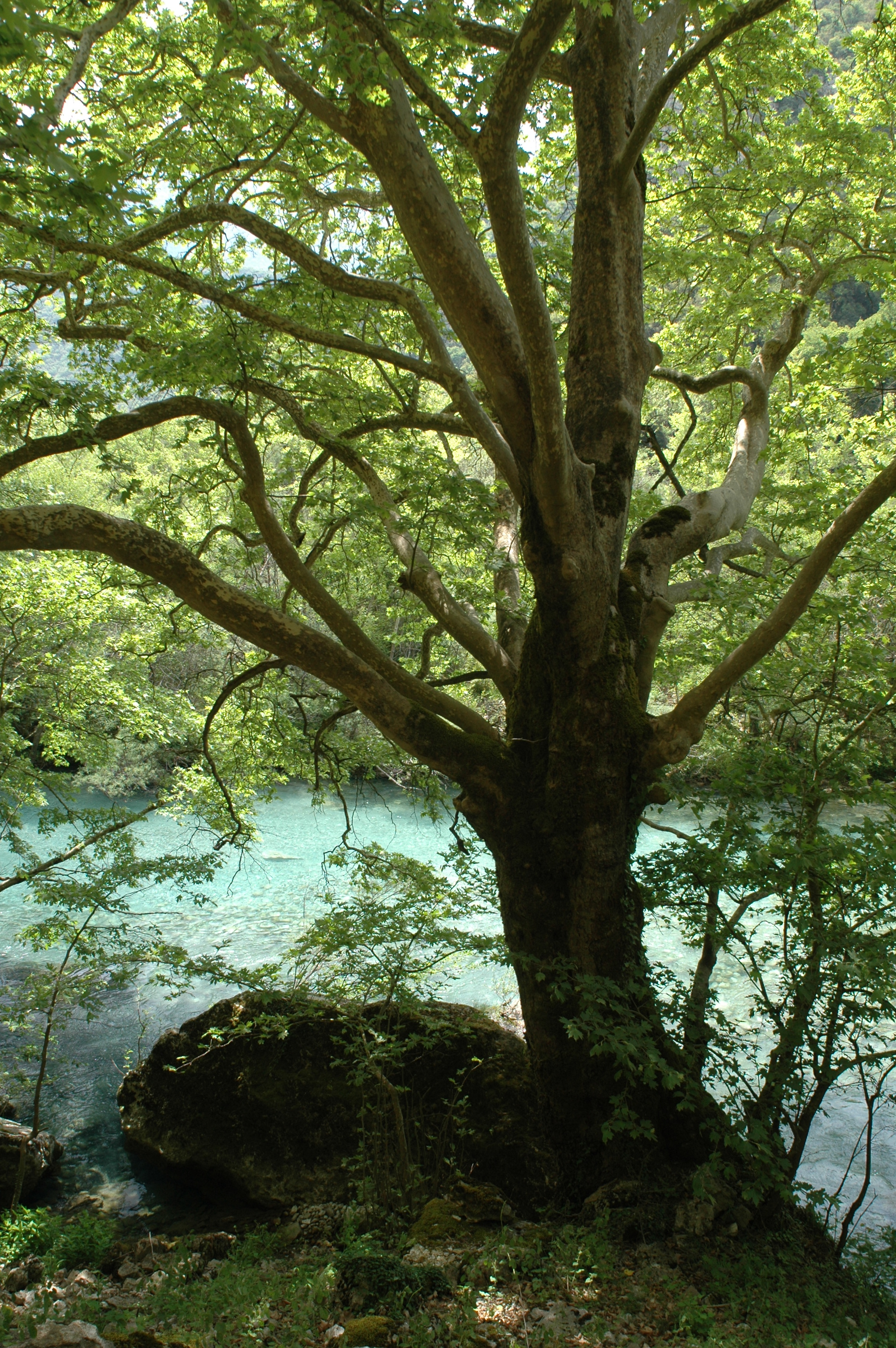
Platanus orientalis tree on the bank of the Voidomatis

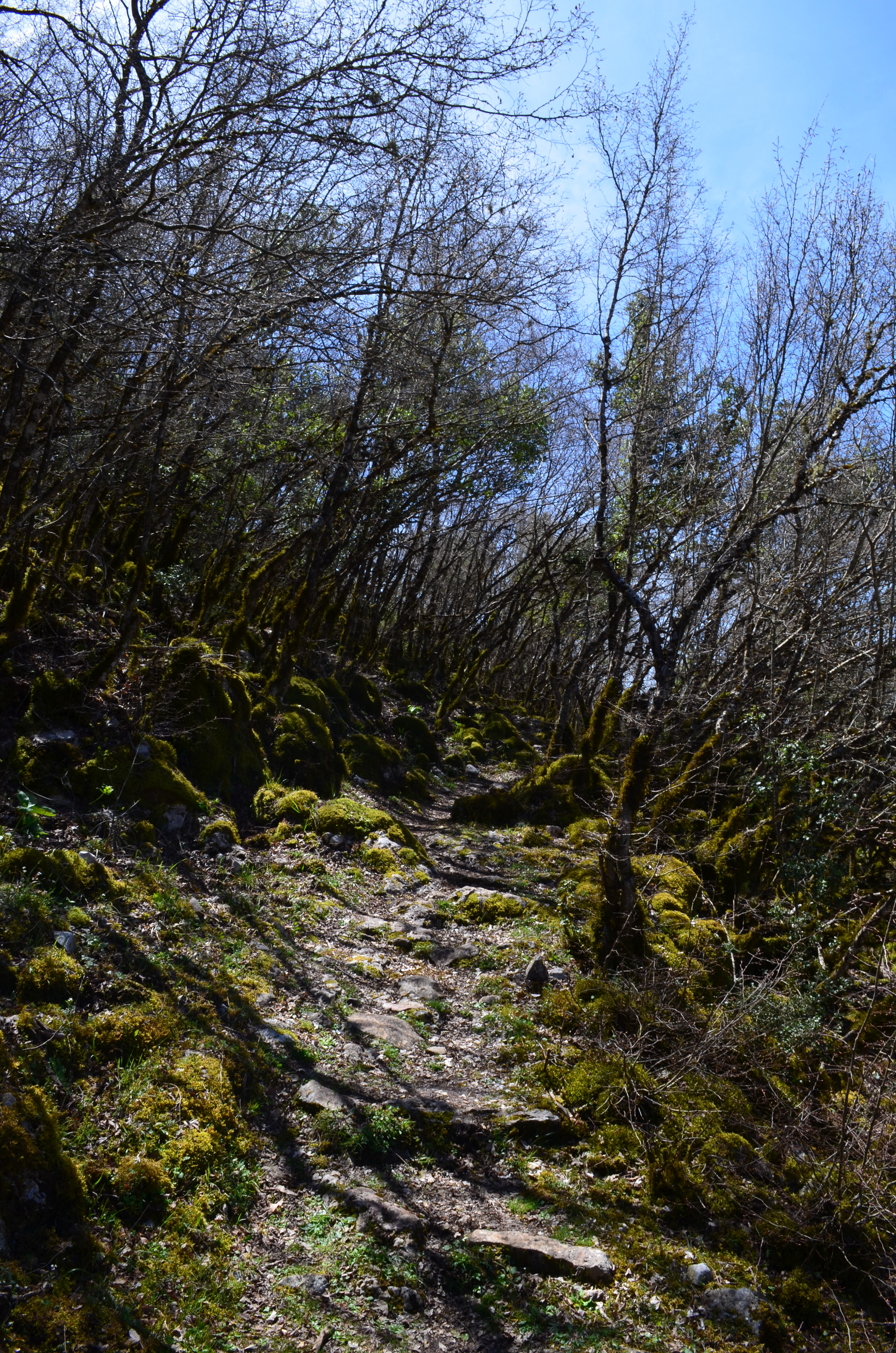
Landscape in Vikos–Aoös National Park.

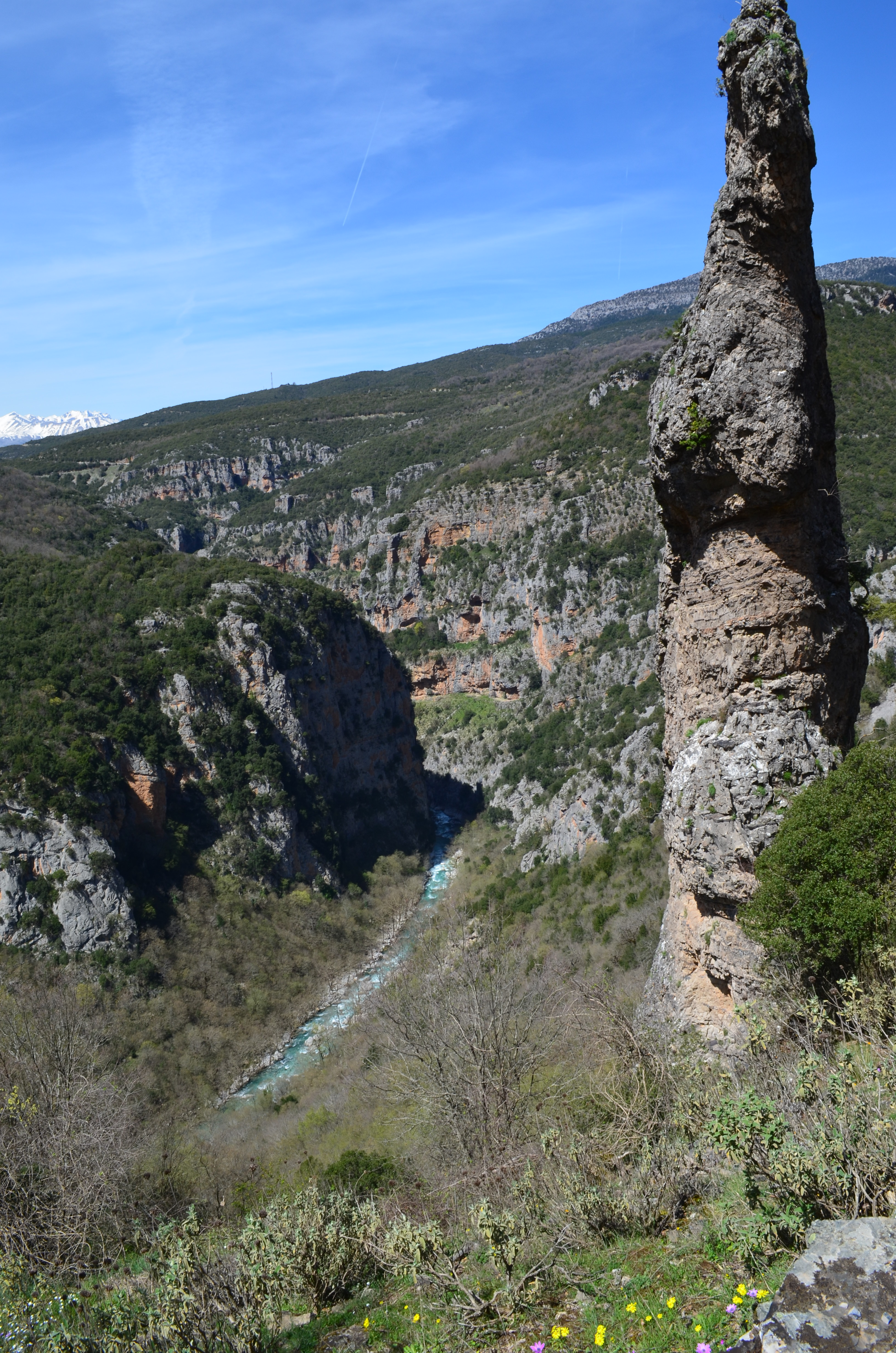
Landscape in Vikos–Aoös National Park.

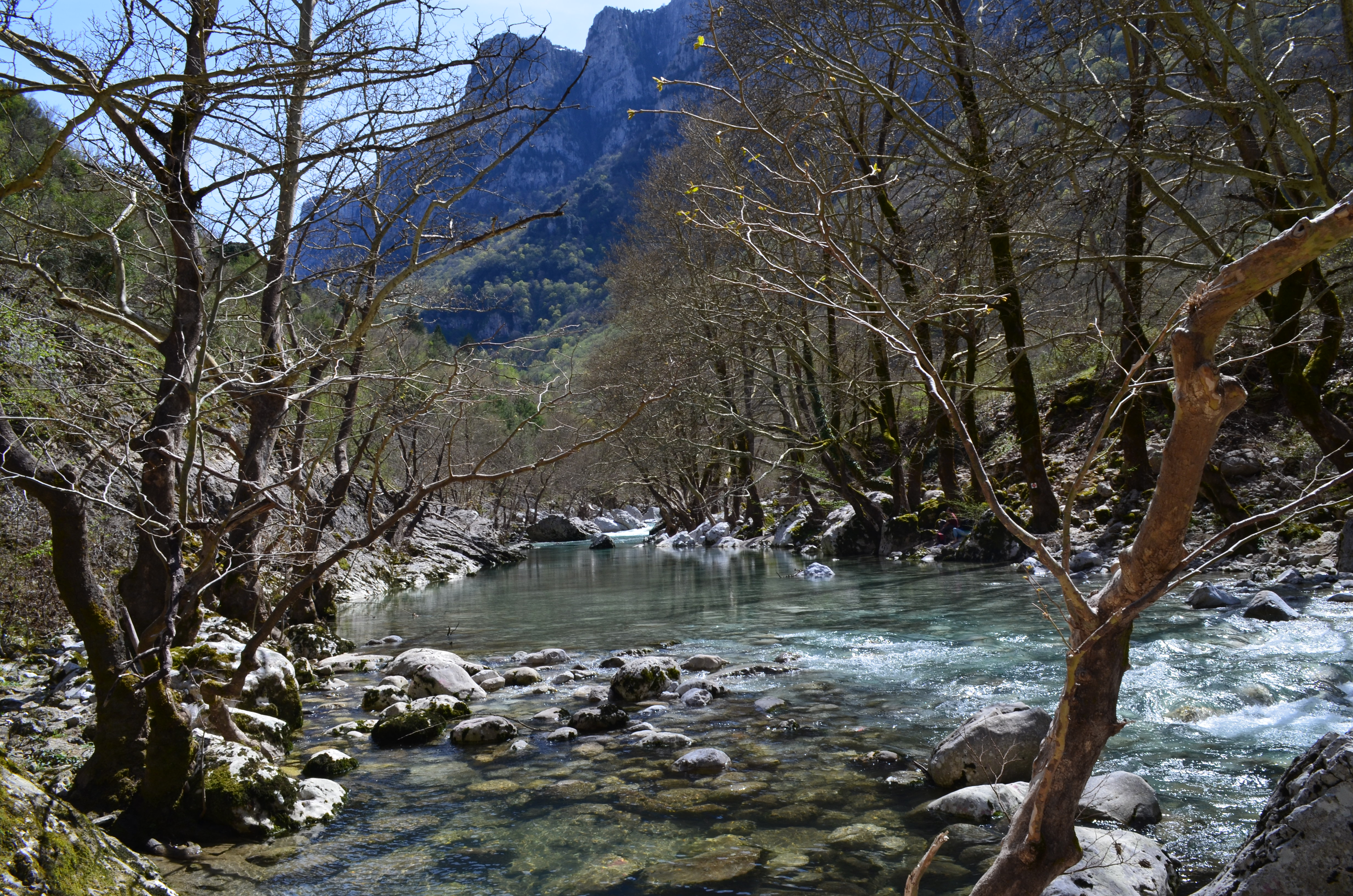
Landscape in Vikos–Aoös National Park.

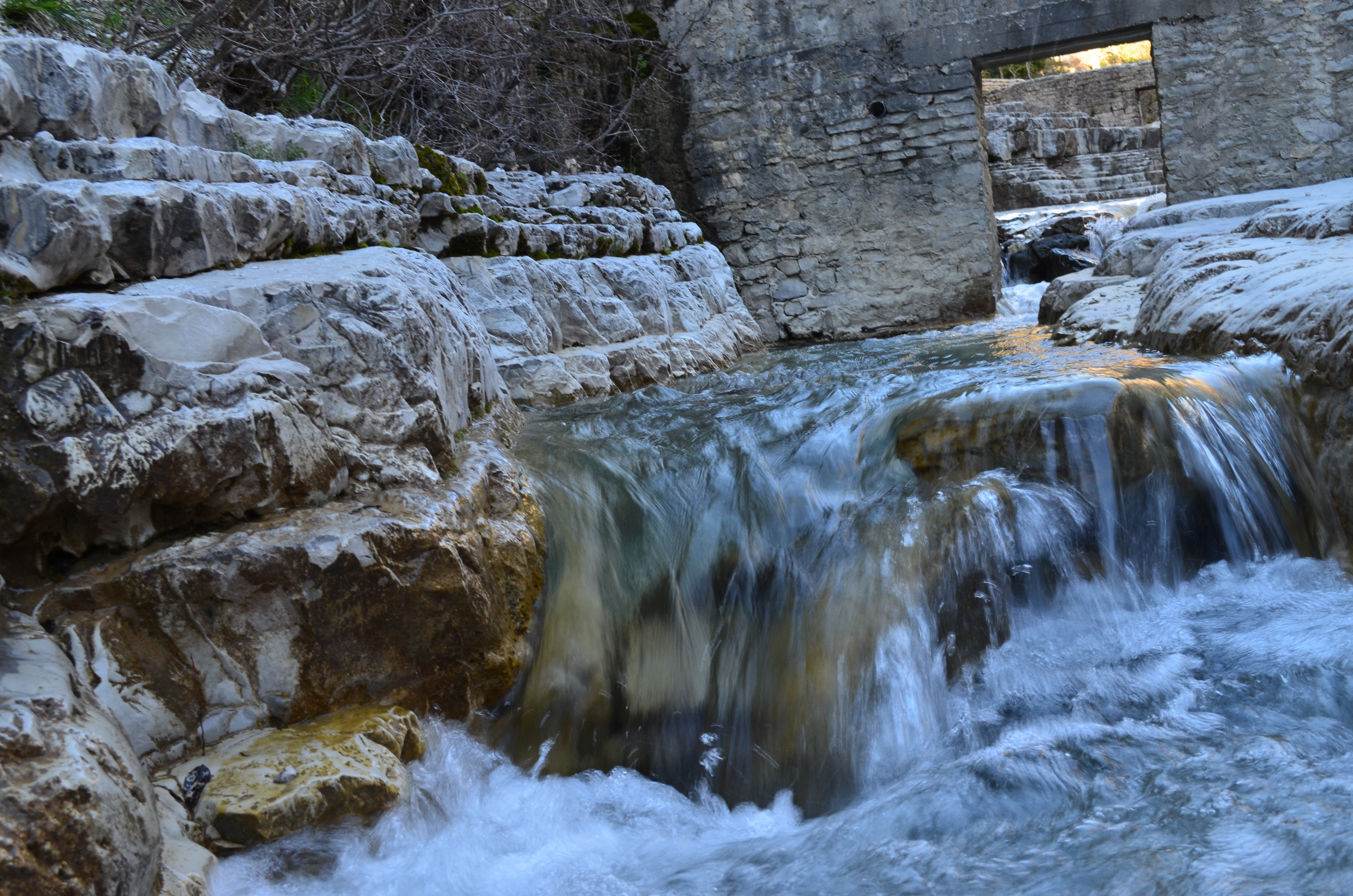
Landscape in Vikos–Aoös National Park.

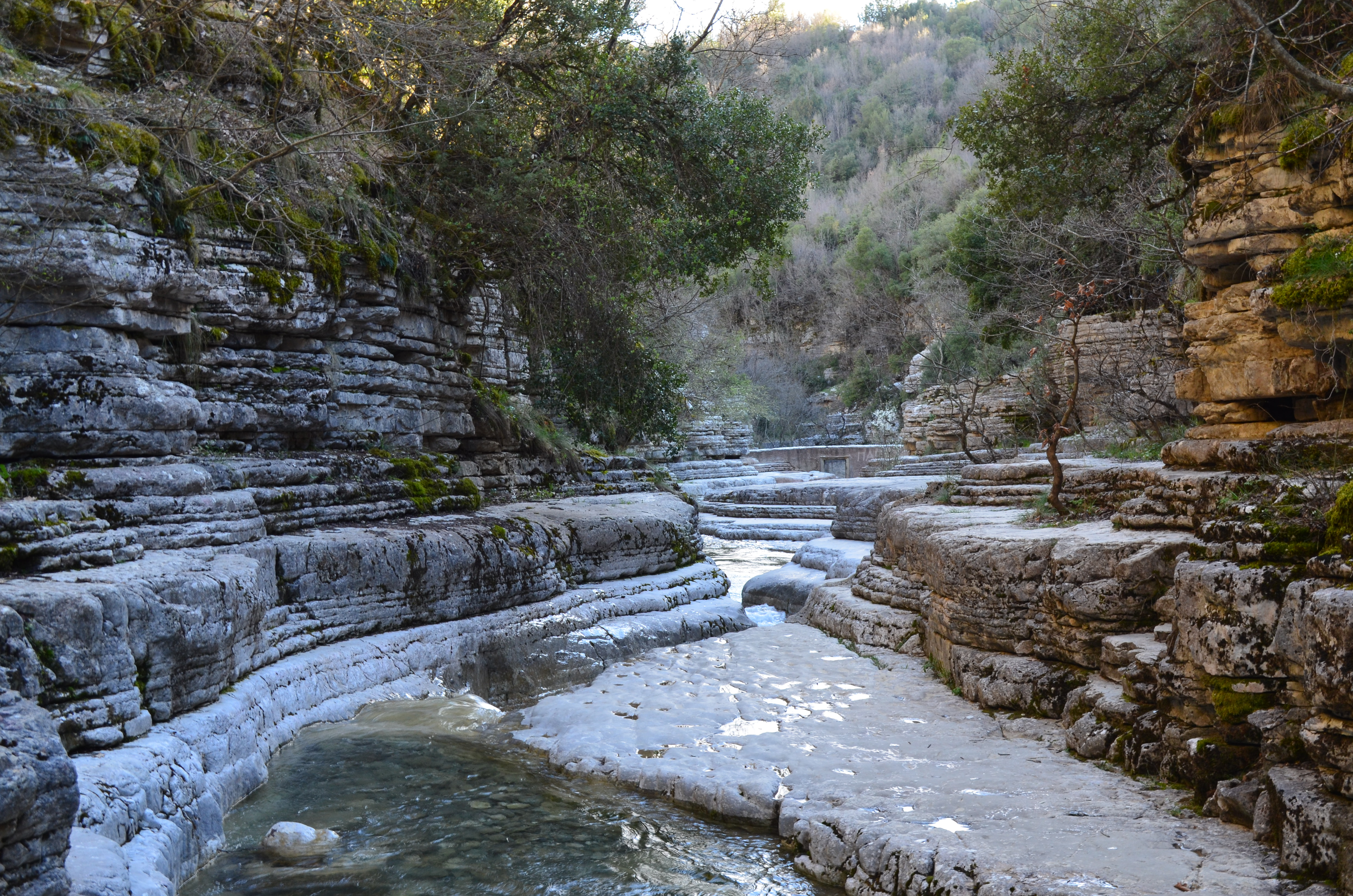
Landscape in Vikos–Aoös National Park.

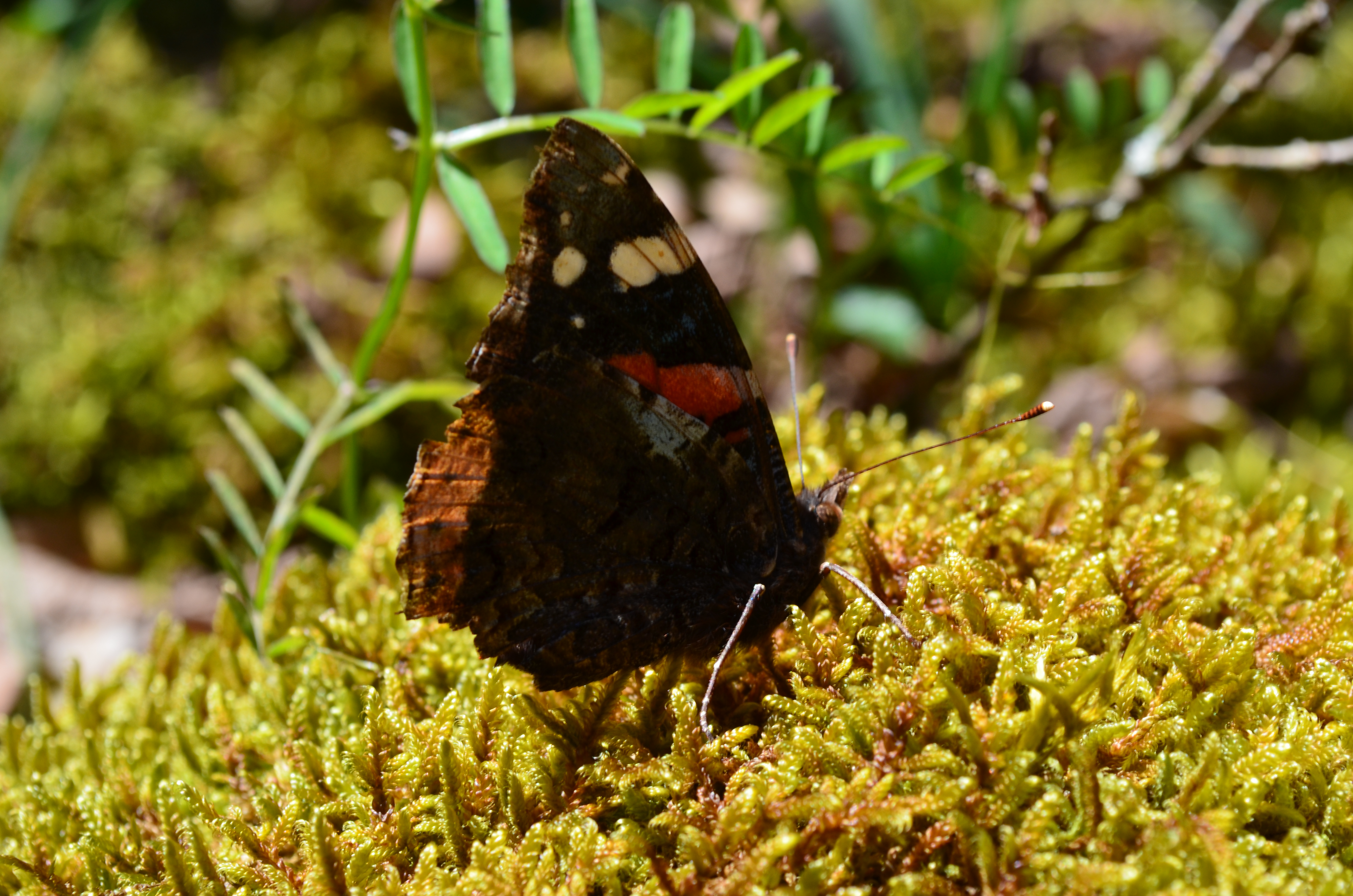
Butterfly in Vikos–Aoös National Park.

== See also ==
- Geography of Greece
- Tourism in Greece

== Sources ==
- Amanatidou, Despoina (2005). "A case study in Vikos-Aoos National Park - Greece" (PDF). University of Freiburg.
- Drakopoulou, Athanasia (2004). "Tourism Certification and Community-based Ecotourism as Tools for Promoting Sustainability in the Greek Tourism Sector - the example of Zagori" (PDF). Lund University. Archived from the original (PDF) on 2011-10-08.
- Hanlidou, Efie; Kokkini, Stella (1997). "On the flora of the Vikos-Aoos National Park (NW Greece)" (PDF). Willdenowia. 27 (1–2): 81–100. Bibcode:1997Willd..27...81H. doi:10.3372/wi.27.2708. ISSN 0511-9618.
- Hughes, P.D.; Gibbard, P.L.; Woodward, J.C. (2003). "Relict rock glaciers as indicators of Mediterranean palaeoclimate during the Last Glacial Maximum (Late Wurmian) in northwest Greece" (PDF). Journal of Quaternary Science. 18 (5): 431–440. Bibcode:2003JQS....18..431H. doi:10.1002/jqs.764. Archived from the original (PDF) on September 22, 2017.
- "Natura 2000 Data Form. Site code: GR2130009" (PDF). NATURA 2000. Greek Ministry for the Environment, Physical Planning & Public Works. 2009. Archived from the original (PDF) on 2011-07-16.
- Papadopoulou, Varvara (2008). "Prefecture of Ioannina, Epirus-Greece" (PDF). Prefectural Committee of Tourist Promotion. Archived from the original (PDF) on 2011-07-19.
- Papageorgiou, Konstantinos (2001). "A Combined Park Management Framework Based on Regulatory and Behavioral Strategies: Use of Visitors' Knowledge to Assess Effectiveness". Environmental Management. 28 (1): 61–73. Bibcode:2001EnMan..28...61P. doi:10.1007/s002670010207. PMID 11437001.
- Paschos, P.; Nikolaou, E.; Papanikos, D. (2004). Explore the landscape, the rocks and the nature of Vikos-Aoos and surrounding area. Find out its history and civilisation (PDF). Greek Institute of Geology & Mineral Exploration. ISBN 978-960-98903-5-9. Archived from the original (PDF) on 2011-07-21.
- Spanopoulou, Kyriaki (2001). "Integrated Programmes for Development of Mountain Regions: The Case of the Tymfi area" (PDF). Directorate for Planning and Evaluation of Regional Policy and Programmes, Republic of Greece, Ministry of National Economy. Archived from the original (PDF) on 2012-10-24.
- Trakolis, Dimitrios (2001). "Perceptions, Preferences, and Reactions of Local Inhabitants in Vikos-Aoos National Park, Greece". National Agricultural Research Foundation. 28 (5): 665–76. Bibcode:2001EnMan..28..665T. doi:10.1007/s002670010251. PMID 11568846.
- Vokou, Despina; Katradia, Katerina; Kokkini, Stella (1993). "Ethnobotanical survey of Zagori (Epirus, Greece), a renowned center of folk medicine in the past". Journal of Ethnopharmacology. 39 (3): 187–196. doi:10.1016/0378-8741(93)90035-4. PMID 8258976.
- Woodward, J.C.; Hamlin, R.H.B.; Macklin, M.G.; Hughes, P.D.; Lewin, J. (2008). "Glacial activity and catchment dynamics in northwest Greece: Long-term river behaviour and the slackwater sediment record for the last glacial to interglacial transition". Geomorphology. 101 (1–2): 44–67. Bibcode:2008Geomo.101...44W. doi:10.1016/j.geomorph.2008.05.018.
