= Vikos doctors =

Greek folk healers

Occupation
- Occupation type: Profession
- Activity sectors: Complementary medicine

Description
- Competencies: Traditional knowledge
- Education required: Acquaintance
- Fields of employment: Traditional medicine, herbal medicine
- Related jobs: Physician

Vikos doctors were folk healers or practical medical practitioners from the Greek area of Zagori in the 18–19th century.

== Etymology ==
The Greek word ἰατρός (iatrós, doctor or healer) is often translated as physician. Vikos doctors (Greek: βικογιατροί) were local doctors practicing a form of herbal medicine in the 18th and 19th century.

== History ==
The Vikos doctors hailed from the area of central Zagori and particularly from the villages of Tsepelovo, Frangades, Papingo, Skamneli, Koukouli, Monodendri and Kapesovo. They used local herbs to heal ailments of people as well as of livestock. These herbs and parts of some other plants were being collected from the Vikos Gorge, hence the attribution. They were descendants of an ancient craft who in the Ottoman period attained great fame. Some even served as advisors in the courts of the Ottoman Sultans. One named Paschaloglou from Kapesovo even became a confidente of four Sultans: Abdul Hamit I, Suleiman III, Mustafa IV and Mahmut II.

One of the herbs used was the nightshade Atropa belladonna for cholicspasms. The drug atropine has been extracted from this plant which is medicinally used for this purpose to our own day. It is also said that two Vikos doctors, Pantazis Exarchou and Zonias, used fungi to treat infected wounds well before penicillin was discovered by Alexander Fleming. Other plants with suspected or known medicinal properties were also in their repertory and grow abundantly in the area, among them the lemon balm Melissa officinalis, St John's Wort Hypericum perforatum, absinth Artemisia absinthium and the elder bush Sambucus nigra

== See also ==
- Zagori
- Vikos–Aoös National Park
