= Anastasios Tagis =

Greek scholar and philological teacher

Anastasios Tagis (Greek: Αναστάσιος Τάγης, 1839–1900) was a Greek scholar and philological teacher of the 19th century.

== Biography ==
Tagis was born in Monodendri of Ioannina (then part of the Ottoman Empire) in 1839. He graduated from the Rizarios School of Athens and later from the Philolological School of the University of Athens where he was awarded the teacher of philology degree. He initially taught in the Gymnasium of Samos, after in Crete and then in Halki. In 1873, he founded, along with others, a Greek high school in Pera of Constantinople (officially Konstaniniyye) and taught in it with his brother, Filippos. Later, in 1869, he was elected a member of the Greek Philological Society of Constantinople (Ελληνικός Φιλολογικός Σύλλογος εν Κωνσταντινούπολει). He also taught in the Vasmatzidis School of Pera and in the famous Zografeion Lyceum.

He wrote interpretations of the Aristotelian definitions of tragedy, elegies, pindar odes and commented on Xenophon and the myths of Aesop. He spoke the Ancient Greek language fluently and completed a Delphic Hymn in 1894.

He died in 1900, at the age of 60 or 61.
