= Namık Kemal High School =

Coordinates: 38.43189°N 27.14567°E

- Konak, İzmir; Turkey

Information
- Type: Anatolian high school Public funded, day school
- Established: 1853; 173 years ago as rüştiye, 1922; 104 years ago as lise
- Colors: Blue and white
- Website: izmirnamikkemallisesi.meb.k12.tr

Namık Kemal High School (Turkish: Namık Kemal Lisesi) is a public funded Anatolian high school in İzmir, Turkey. It was founded in 1853 as a rüştiye and became a lise in 1922. It is located at the north of Kültürpark in the historic Evangelical School.

== History ==
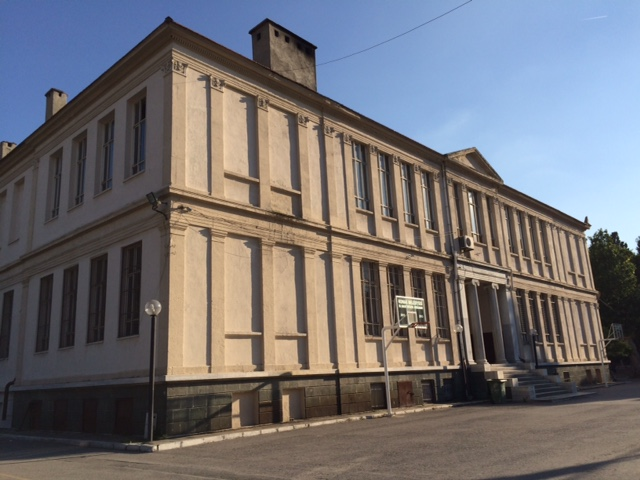

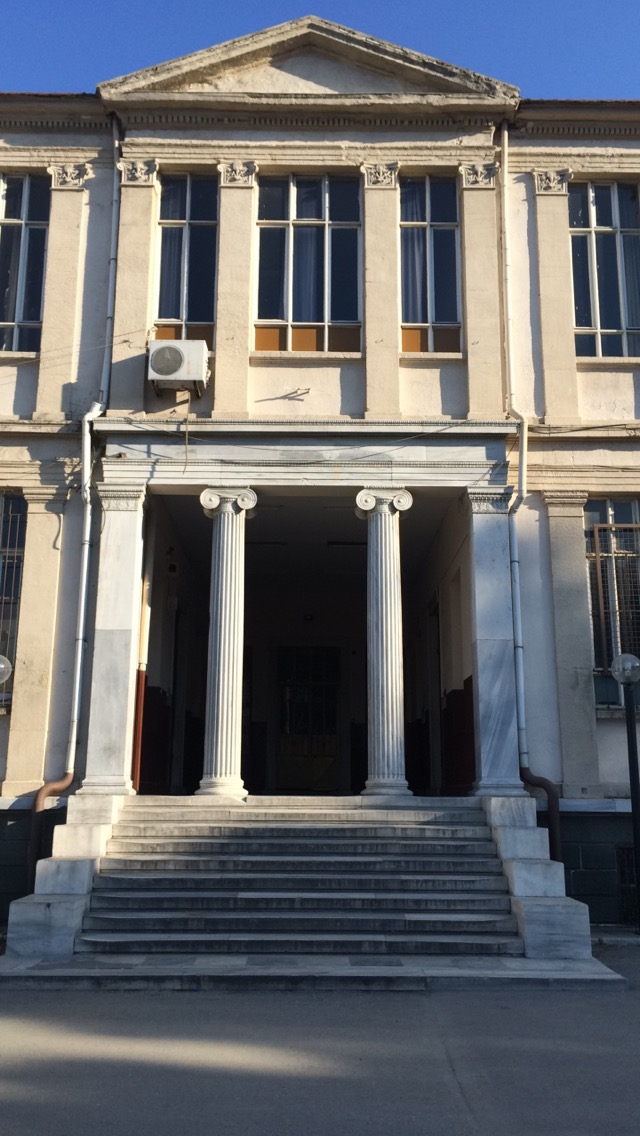
Entrance of the building with two Ionic columns

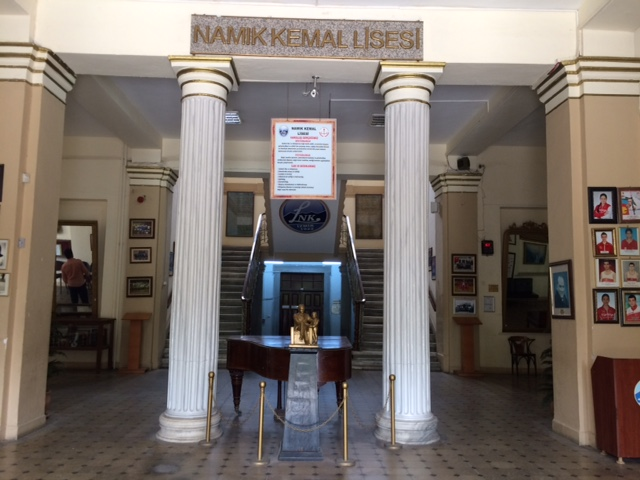
In inside two Doric columns

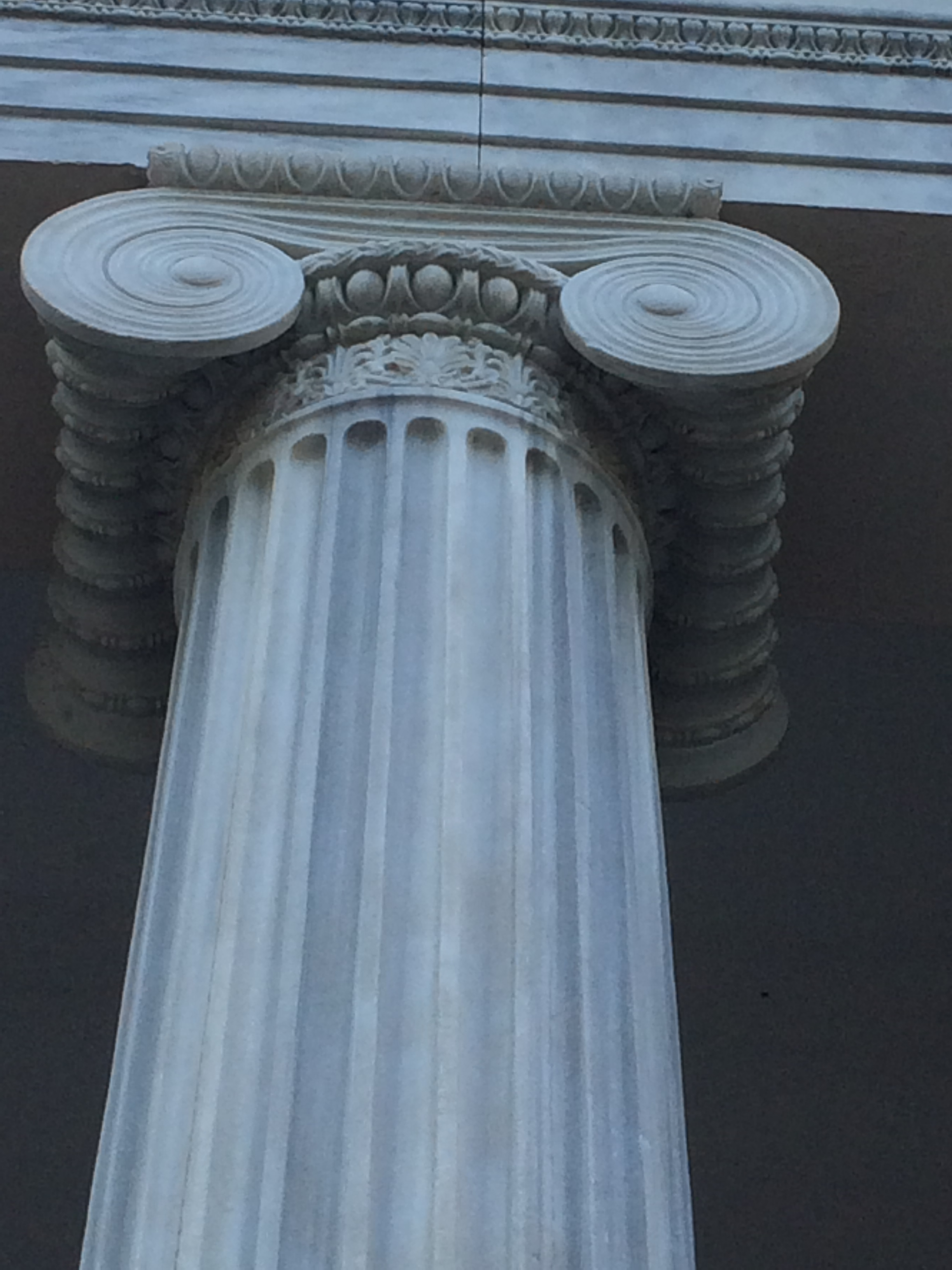
Details of Ionic columns

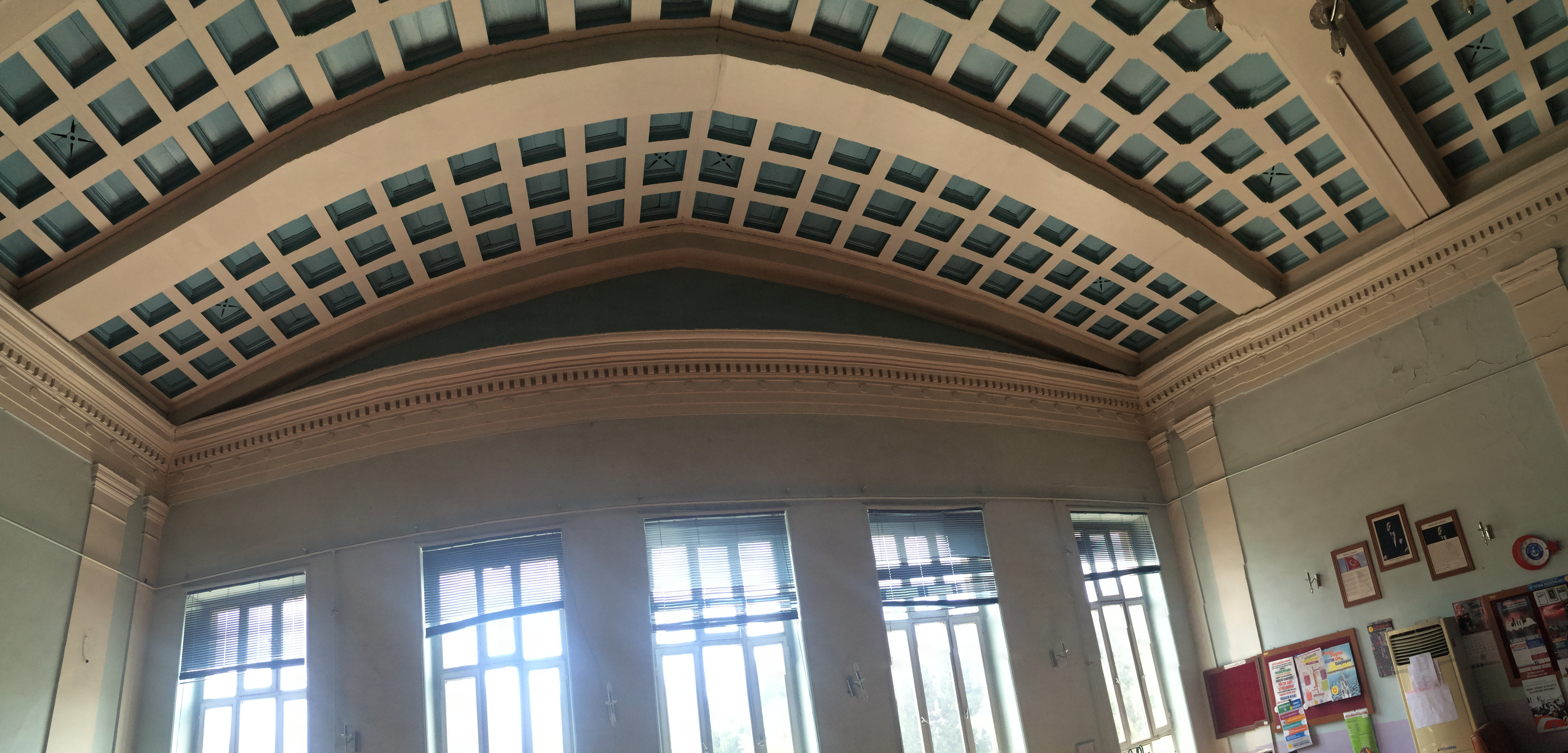
Details of the ceiling

Details of the door ornamentations

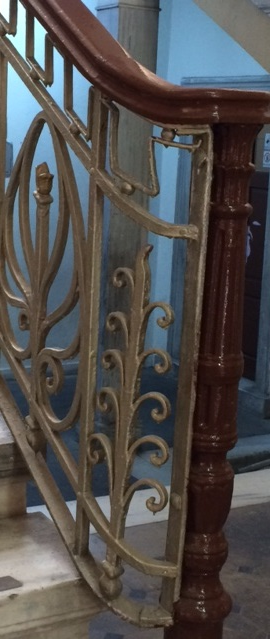
Ornamentations of the staircase

Firstly, it was decided to build the structure in 1909 by increase of number of the students of the Evangelical School of Smyrna (Greek: Ἡ ἐν Σμύρνῃ Εὐαγγελική Σχολή, Turkish: Rum Evanjelik Mektebi) and its construction plot was purchased with gathering the funds. Then, the building which is now known as Namık Kemal High School was started building. However, its construction was stopped by Balkan Wars and the First World War. Afterwards, construction was started again in 1919–1922 while Greek government was in the saddle. Although retouch of building was finished 1922 summer, the school could not move to the new building because of Greco-Turkish population exchange and Küçük Asya Felaketi. After the proclamation of Turkey Republic, the building devolved on Turks. For a while, it was used as a hospital and quarter of English during the war. The building was also used as İzmir Kız High School at 1924–25 and used as a guesthouse by Kültürpark. In 1939, it was used as İzmir İkinci Erkek High School after that it is renamed as İnönü High School. The building was renamed again as Namık Kemal High School in 1952–53. Nowadays, it is called as Namık Kemal Anatolia High School.

== Context ==
Namık Kemal High School is located in Konak İzmir (north of Kültürpark). Although it was used for different purposes in the past, it is used educational recently. One approach of the building is from a thoroughfare, the other one is from a street alley.

== Formal qualities ==
The building has Neo-Greek and Neo-Classic style. It has E-shaped plan. There is one main block and three perpendicular blocks. It has pitch roof and triangular pediments are emphasized on the facade.

== Spatial experience ==
The repetition of plasters between rectangular windows make pattern on the facade. The entrance is defined by high platform and two Ionic columns. Inside, there are two Doric columns are following the two Ionic columns. Timber is used on the handrail. There are floral motives on the balustrades. The building has numerous marble ornamentations and a coffer ceiling. It has 2 terraces facing the garden.

== Structure and material qualities ==
Doric columns and marble pillars are load bearing members of the building. Timber, marble, stone and iron used as materials. Using marble in the ornamentation make the building fancier.
