= Dimitrios Sarros =

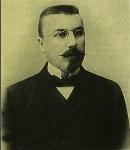
- A portrait of Dimitrios Sarros.
- Native name: Δημήτριος Σάρρος
- Born: c. 1869/70; Vitsa, Janina Vilayet, Ottoman Empire (now Greece)
- Died: c. 1937 Athens, Kingdom of Greece
- Allegiance: Kingdom of Greece
- Branch: HMC
- Conflicts: Macedonian Struggle
- Education: Zosimaia School; University of Athens
- Other work: Scholar; Teacher; Writer; Educational advisor

Dimitrios Μ. Sarros (Greek: Δημήτριος Σάρρος; 1869/70-1937) was a Greek scholar, teacher, soldier and writer of the late 19th and 20th centuries.

== Biography ==
Sarros was born in 1869 or 1870 in Vitsa of Zagori. He graduated from the Zosimaia School of Ioannina and later from the Philosophical School of the University of Athens. He initially was appointed as a teacher to a school of Piraeus (1897). He later taught in Larnaca and in the Pancyprian Gymnasium of Nicosia. In 1902 he was appointed as a teacher to Serres and Alexandroupoli, where he got involved with the Macedonian Committee and became an active member of the Macedonian Struggle. Later, he served as a teacher in the Phanar Greek Orthodox College, the Joachimio Greek Girls' School of Constantinople and in Thessaloniki. He was also a member of the Greek Philological Society of Constantinople (Ελληνικός Φιλολογικός Σύλλογος) and contributed as a judge and rapporteur in literary and folklore competitions of the philological magazine of the Society. At the same time, he developed nationalistic actions, as in 1912 he organized the first congress of teachers of the enslaved Hellenism of Asia Minor and attended a Great National Assembly, thus being expelled and imprisoned by the Ottoman authorities. After the Asia Minor Catastrophe, he taught in Corfu and later in Kallithea. In 1926 he became an educational advisor of the Greek Ministry of Religious Affairs and Education until 1935.

== Selected writings ==
- Démétrios M. Sarros. Διορθωτικὰ εἰς Εὐριπίδην Ἰφιγένεια ή ἐν Ταύροις, original 1920, Constantinople
- Παρατηρήσεις εις το Ηπειρωτικόν γλωσσάριον του Π. Αραβαντινού, 1920, Constantinople
- Περί των εν Ηπείρω Μακεδονία και Θράκη συνθηματικών γλωσσών, 1923, Athens
- Πώς είδε και πώς ετραγούδησεν ο Λόρδος Βύρων την Ήπειρον, 1935, Athens
