= Evangelical School of Smyrna =

Evangelical School
- Ευαγγελική Σχολή
- İzmir (Smyrna); Ottoman Empire

Information
- Type: Secondary male school
- Established: 1733
- Closed: 1922
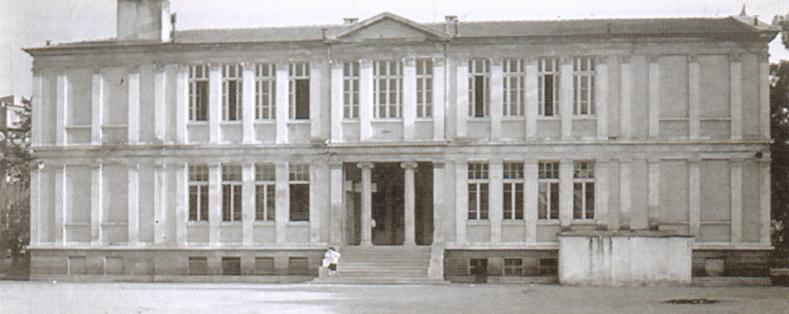
- The building of the school, early 20th century

The Evangelical School (Greek: Ευαγγελική Σχολή officially Ἡ ἐν Σμύρνῃ Εὐαγγελική Σχολή) was a Greek educational institution established in 1733 in Smyrna, Ottoman Empire, now İzmir, Turkey. The school, initially an Orthodox Church-approved institution, attracted major figures of the Modern Greek Enlightenment. During the late 19th-early 20th century it became the most important Greek school in the city, possessing an archaeological museum, a natural science collection and a library, which contained some 50,000 volumes and 180 manuscripts. The Evangelical School ceased its operation in 1922 as a result of the Turkish capture of Smyrna, and was converted into the Namik Kemal High School.

== Early years and Greek Enlightenment ==
The school originated as a church approved institution and was established after the efforts of the local Greek Orthodox bishop. It was originally known as Greek School (Greek: Ελληνικό Φροντιστήριο), while its name changed several times during the 18th century. Finally, at 1808 the Ecumenical Patriarch granted the appellation, Evangelical School, by which it would be known until 1922. Financially, until the Greek War of Independence (1821-1830), the school was supported by individual benefactors, who either offered money directly to the school or sponsored scholarships for students.

In 1747 the school came under the protection of the British consulate of the city after the initiative of the local merchant Pantoleon Sevastopoulos. Sevastopoulos, in order to secure the school against a possible Ottoman confiscation, managed to acquire the full protection of Great Britain, something that was recognized by the Ottoman Sultans.

The Evangelical School, was initially orientated towards a traditional, religious-centered model of education. However, it saw two progressive interludes, probably due to rivalry with the Philological Gymnasium, another Greek school of the city, until the later was closed down by force in 1819 due to conservative reactions. During the following years a number of progressive headmasters were appointed. In 1811, Theophilos Kairis became headmaster, followed by Benjamin of Lesbos in 1820, both of them figures of the modern Greek Enlightenment and two of the most eminent representatives of the group of reform mathematics teachers from the Eastern Aegean region. Especially, Kairis taught mathematics and physics, but soon he left the school due to the differences in his views with those of the school board.

== Later period (1830–1922) ==
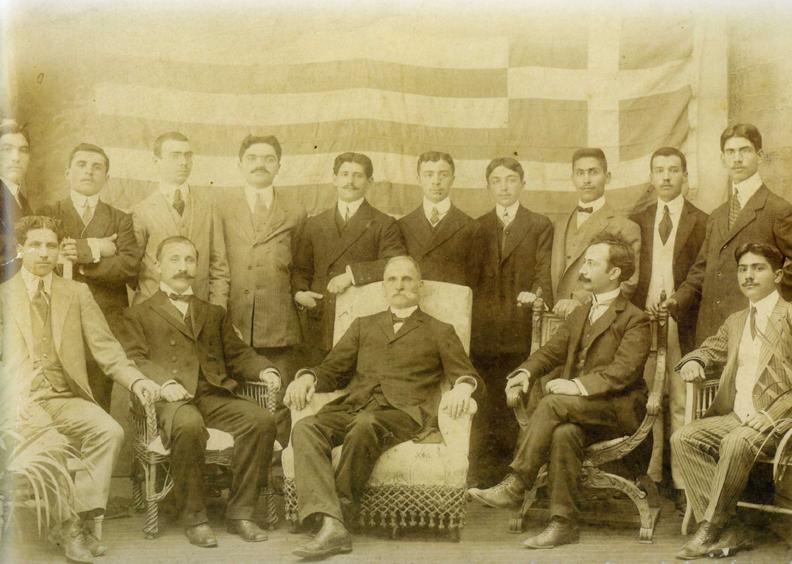
Graduates and teachers, with the headmaster Matthaios Paranikas, 1878.

With the years the school adopted more progressive and rationalistic educational methods, as well as the teaching of modern mathematics and sciences in the 'Western' manner, which at times attracted the attention of the conservative circles of the Ecumenical Patriarchate.

At the late 19th and early 20th century, Smyrna was a major commercial and educational center of the Greek world. The city was the home of 67 well-equipped Greek school units in addition to 4 girl schools. The Evangelical school during this period was the most important Greek educational institution in the city. Apart from the schools, it possessed an archaeological museum, significant natural science collection, and an excellent library which contained some 50,000 volumes and 180 manuscripts.

Numerous graduates of the school such as Giorgos Tsitseklis and Nikos Manganiotis, despite being citizens of the Ottoman Empire volunteered for the Greek Army. The new and bigger building of the school was saved from the Great Fire of Smyrna and after it, the school building was used as the Hospital of the Levantines for approximately 1.5–2 years and served as a hospital. Upon the increase in the Turkish-Muslim population in İzmir after the War of Independence in 1924, the Girls' High School, which continued its education in the Karataş District, moved to Namık Kemal High School with all its belongings and started education as Girls' Vocational High School.

In memory of the Evangelical School, a new school was founded in Nea Smyrni district, Athens, in 1934 called New Evangelical School. On the other hand, the educational facilities in İzmir today used to be Turkish public schools.

== Notable graduates ==
- Ambrosios Pleianthidis, metropolitan bishop
- Saint Nicodemus the Hagiorite
- Saint Daniel Katounakiotis
- Manolis Kalomiris
- Adamantios Korais
- Nick the Greek
- Aristotle Onassis
- Timotheos Evangelinidis
- Stelios Zeimbekos

== Sources ==
- Augustinos, Gerasimos (1992). The Greeks of Asia Minor: confession, community, and ethnicity in the nineteenth century. Kent State University Press. ISBN 978-0-87338-459-9.
