= Monastery of Saint Paraskevi (Vikos) =

Former Eastern Orthodox monastery in Greece

- Μονή Αγίας Παρασκευής
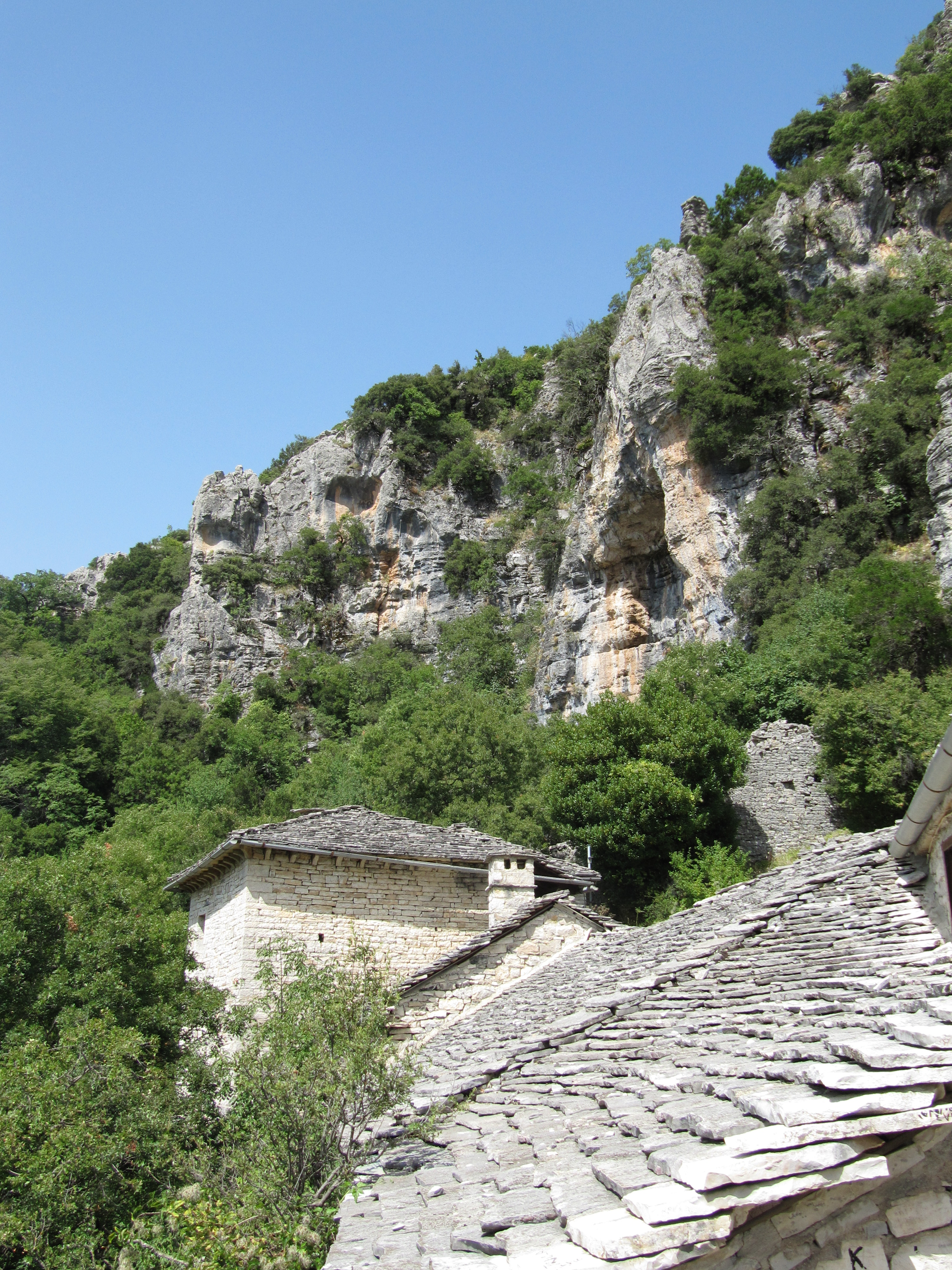
- The roof of the former monastery

- Location of the former monastery in Greece
- Interactive map of Monastery of Saint Paraskevi

Monastery information
- Order: Ecumenical Patriarchate of Constantinople (former)
- Denomination: Eastern Orthodox Church (former)
- Diocese: Ioannina (former)

People
- Founder: Michael Therianos

Architecture
- Status: Monastery (former)
- Functional status: Inactive (abandoned)
- Style: Byzantine (Basilica)
- Completion date: c. 1414

Site
- Location: Vikos Gorge, Zagori, Ioannina
- Country: Greece
- Coordinates: 39°53′00″N 20°45′00″E
- Public access: Yes

The Monastery of Saint Paraskevi (Greek: Μονή Αγίας Παρασκευής) is an abandoned Eastern Orthodox monastery situated on the edge of Vikos Gorge, near Zagori, in the Ioannina region of northwestern Greece. The monastery was founded in c. 1413 – c. 1414 and consists of a small stone-built chapel, the oldest preserved in Zagori, and offers panoramic views to the gorge.

== Foundation and description ==
The monastery, named after Saint Paraskevi (Greek: Αγία Παρασκευή, romanized: Aghia Paraskevi), was founded in c. 1413 – c. 1414. According to an inscription over its gate, the foundation took place when the local ruler of Epirus was Despot Carlo I Tocco. It was built by the inhabitants of the nearby village of Vitsa and with the personal expense of a local lord, the voevoda Michael Therianos. Tradition mentions that Therianos built the monastery as an act of thanksgiving for his daughter's savior suffering from an incurable illness.

The church is a small basilica, with only a nave and a wooden roof, surrounded by the monks' cells. The frescoes of the temple partially date to 15th century. On the northern wall, there is a donor portrait of Therianos, his wife and children. The depictions are indicative of the dressing code of that time. The outfits of the benefactors are luxurious with rich embroidered cloths, broad braids and fringes. His daughter, Theodora, is wearing a white kerchief on her head, which is wrapped around her neck. The wall paintings on the south wall are dated from the relevant inscription around 1689.

== Surroundings ==
The monastery is built at the edge of a rough rock that stands over the Vikos Gorge. The closest village, Monodendri, is a 15-minute walk away. From the terrace of the chapel, which has been appropriately designed, visitors can safely watch over the gorge.

A number of caves are located in the middle of the rough side of Vikos north and east of the monastery, where hermits and persecuted Christians sought refuge during the Ottoman era. Moreover, for the same reason, a number of small dwellings were built around 1816.

Being in the Metropolitanate of Ioannina, the former monastery was under the spiritual jurisdiction of the Patriarchate of Constantinople, rather than that of the Church of Greece.

== See also ==
- List of Eastern Orthodox church buildings in Greece
- List of Eastern Orthodox monasteries in Greece
