= Matthaios Paranikas =

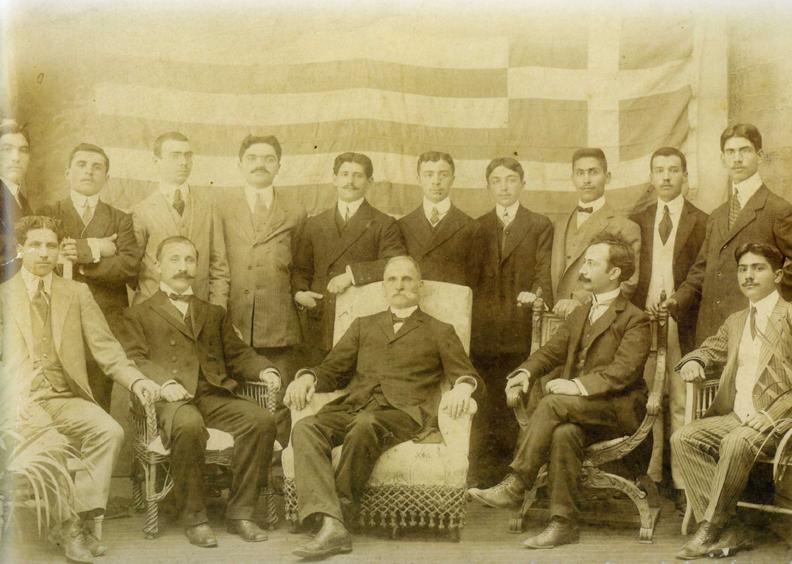
- Matthaios Paranikas (sitting) with some teachers and graduates of the Evangelical School of Smyrna in 1878
- Born: 1832; Vitsa, Janina Vilayet
- Died: 1914 (aged 81–82); Constantinople
- Education: Zosimaia School, University of Athens, LMU Munich
- Occupations: Scholar, philologist teacher and writer

Matthaios K. Paranikas (Greek: Ματθαίος Παρανίκας; 1832–1914) was an ethnically Greek scholar, philologist teacher and writer of the 19th and early 20th centuries who was born in and a national of the Ottoman Empire.

== Biography ==
Paranikas was born in 1832 in Vitsa of Zagori. He successfully graduated from the Zosimaia School of Ioannina, the Philolosophical School of the University of Athens and finished his studies at the Ludwig-Maximilians-Universität München (LMU) where he got the Philosophy Teacher degree. From then he became a teacher in many Greek schools of the Ottoman Empire including the Zappeion Greek girls' school of Constantinople, Theological School of Halki and in Madytos. He served as a headmaster in schools of Chalkidona, Adrianople and the famous Evangelical School of Smyrna (1878-1885). He was an early member of the Greek Phlilological Society of Constantinople (Ελληνικός Φιλολογικός Σύλλογος) since 1863 when it was established just in 1861. There he made many historical and philological researches, of which many of them were published in the philological magazine of the society, in the Athenian philological magazines Parnassos and Pandora but as well as in the Ecclesiastical Truth magazine of the Ecumenical Patriarchate.

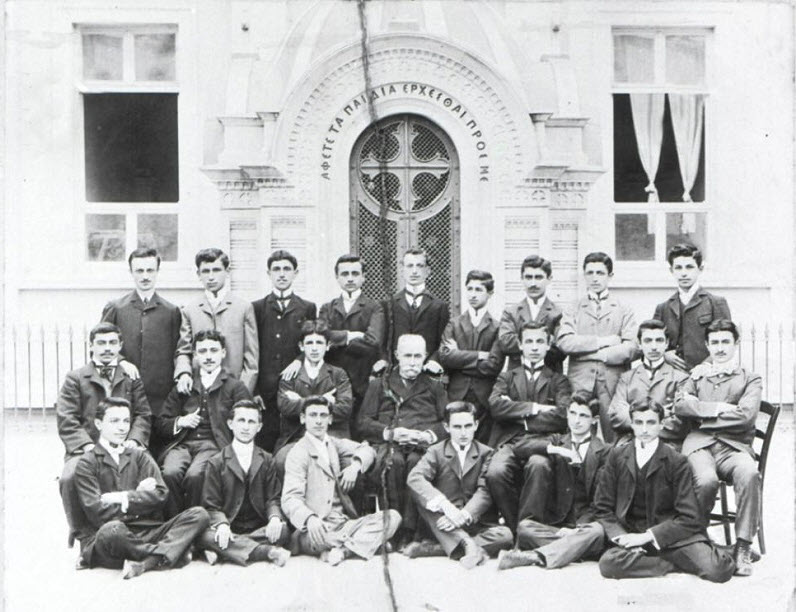
Matthaios Paranikas with Graduates of the Phrontisterion of Trapezous, 1903

He served as a headmaster of the Phrontisterion of Trapezous in the periods of 1895-96 and 1903–04, when he retired. He died in 1914 at the age of 71 or 72.

== Selected writings ==
- Σχεδίασμα περί της εν τω ελληνικώ έθνει καταστάσεως των γραμμάτων από Αλώσεως Κωνσταντινουπόλεως (1453 μ.Χ.) μέχρι των αρχών της ενεστώσης (ΙΘ') εκατονταετηρίδος, Constantinople, 1867
- Anthologia graeca carminum christianorum, Leipzig, 1871 (in Latin)
- Περιήγησις Ανδρέου Λιβαδηνού, 1873
- Ιστορία της Ευαγγελικής Σχόλης Σμύρνης [History of the Evangelical School of Smyrna], Athens, 1885
