= Monodendri, Ioannina =

Monodendri Μονοδένδρι
- Community
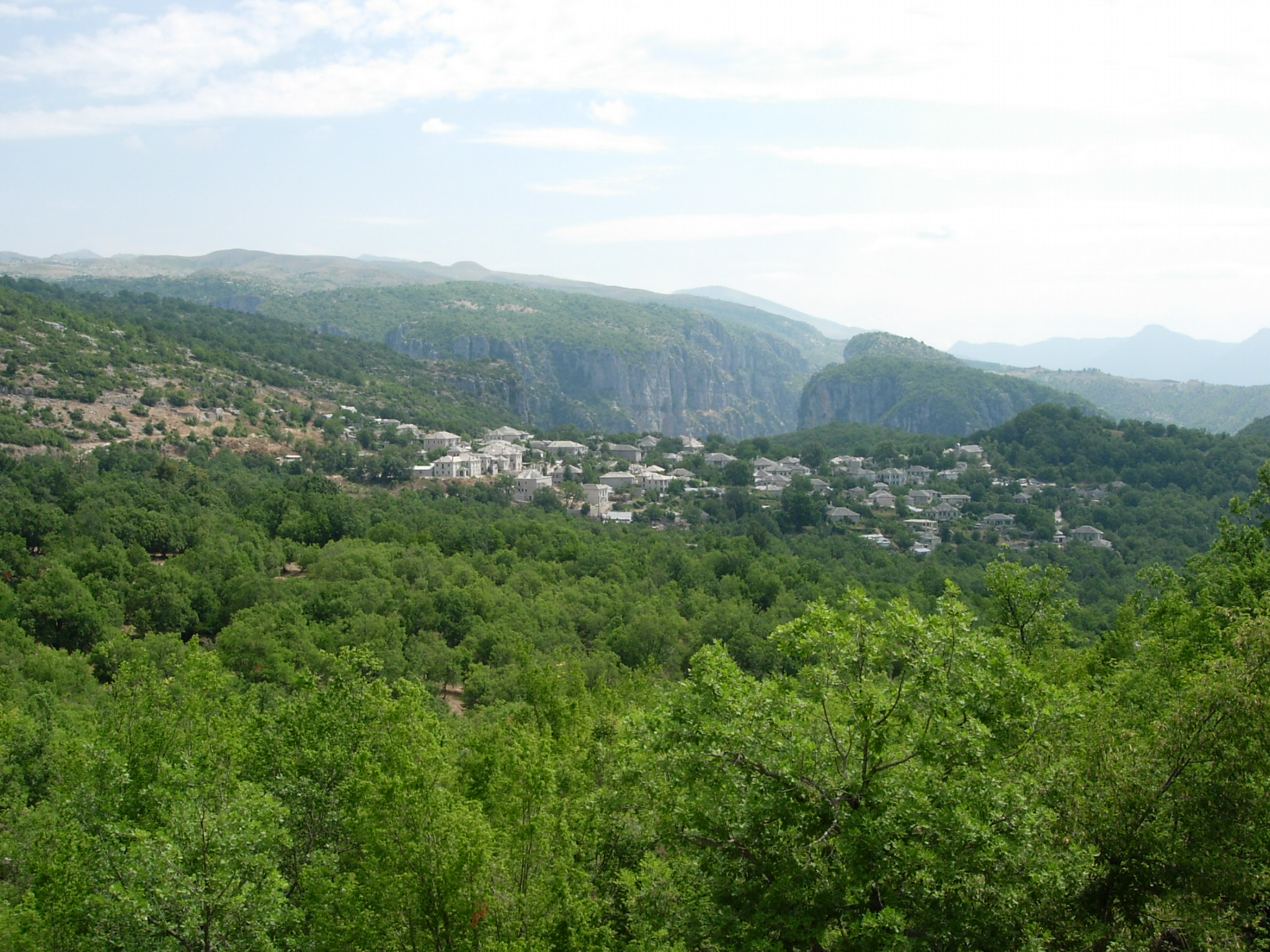
- Monodendri

- Location within Greece
- Coordinates: 39°53′N 20°45′E
- Country: Greece
- Administrative region: Epirus
- Regional unit: Ioannina
- Municipality: Zagori
- Municipal unit: Central Zagori
- Elevation: 1,060 m (3,480 ft)

Population (2021)
  - Community: 133
- Time zone: UTC+2 (EET)
  - Summer (DST): UTC+3 (EEST)
- Vehicle registration: ΙΝ

Monodendri (Greek: Μονοδένδρι) is a village in the Ioannina regional unit (Epirus region) in Greece. It is part of the municipal unit of Central Zagori in the Zagori region, and is located 41 kilometres (25 mi) north of the city of Ioannina.

Monodendri is built at a height of 1,060 meters (3,480 ft) and retains much of the traditional stone-built architecture.

== Name ==
The toponym Monodendri is a compound of the Greek adjective monos and the noun dendri, later dendrion, which stems from the Ancient Greek dendron. When used as a prefix, mono-, the adjective indicates that the subject is unique, singular, or occurs only once. The shift in tone from dendron to dendri follows a common linguistic pattern, seen in pairs like kouti-paliokouti or paidi-paliopaidi. The form manadentri from monodentri is a false etymology linking it to the word man(n)a.

The name of the village originates from a large fir tree near the former monastery of Agios Minas, which was struck by lightning and survived until 1840.

== History ==
Monodendri was previously considered a neighbourhood of the village of Vitsa. As with the other Zagori villages, Monodendri enjoyed an extended period of commercial and economic prosperity during the 17th and 18th centuries. There were schools built, churches in the Byzantine style and luxurious stone manors (Greek: Αρχοντικά). The first school, the Scholarcheion, was founded in 1750. In the school taught among others Paparousis, who later in 1814 taught in the Academy of Bucharest and in Vienna, where he published an article on Physical Science in Logios Hermes (Hermes ho Logios). In the Scholarcheion also taught the renowned Neophytos Dotos (1814–18) and Anastasios Sakellarios from 1825 to 1830, when he left to direct the new Zosimaia School in Ioannina. The school is said to have had also some distinguished students, among them Georgios Gennadios and the revolutionary leader Markos Botsaris from Souli.

The Greek Muslim Janissary, local warlord and Ottoman governor of Ioannina and Trikala known as Aslan Pasha (d. 1618) was born into a Greek Orthodox family in Vitsa-Monodendri in the late 1500s. Like many Christian Greek and Albanian youths from the highlands of northern Greece and the Peloponnese between the early 1400s and late 1600s Aslan Pasha became a Janissary followiing his recruitment into the devşirme or Ottoman child-levy. In the years leading up to his appointment as governor, he fought in Hungary during Ottoman campaigns of the Long Turkish War, 1593-1606. Before Aslan Pasha's death and after suppressing a local Christian peasant revolt led by Dionysius the Philosopher, he commanded the building of the Aslan Pasha Mosque directly on the site of the Church of St John, which he himself had had destroyed after putting down the revolt. Aslan Pasha's tomb and that of his Greek Orthodox wife from Ioannina are located in the grounds of the mosque.

Monodendri was also the birthplace of the merchants, national benefactors and brothers Manthos and Georgios Rizaris, and of Angelos Kitsos (former president of the Rizarios Foundation). There were three schools in Monodendri in the 19th century, a primary school (“Ellinikon” or Common School of Greek Studies (Greek: Κοινή Σχολή Ελληνικών Μαθημάτων) founded by Manthos and Georgios Rizaris in 1835 and housed in their original home), an Allelodidaktikon (high school) and a school for girls, the Parthenagogeion, also founded by the Rizaris brothers in 1841.

Monodendrites usually immigrated to Macedonia and Southern Greece. Outside Greece, they immigrated to Egypt, Romania, Asia Minor, Africa and the United States.

== Demographics ==
The village is inhabited by Greeks, Arvanite families who assimilated into the local population and some Sarakatsani who settled in the village during the early 20th century. The arrival of Orthodox Albanians (locally called "Arvanites") occurred in the modern period and originate from the wider Souli area in central Greek Epirus, while the Sarakatsani are Greek speakers.

== Architecture ==
The church of Aghios Athanasios, in the middle of the central square, is of significant historical value. The bequests of the Rizari brothers are visible in the village today, and include the Rizarios Exhibition Center, the Rizarios Handicraft School and the primary school. The amphitheatrically built stone theater, in the village end, is used for cultural festivals during the summer months.

The monastery of St Elias dates from the period of the foundation of Monodendri at the turn of the 15th century. From the same time dates also the church of St George (Agios Georgios). Georgios Gennadios and Markos Botsaris were during their childhood students at the monastery of St Elias.

Near the village lies the historic monastery of Agia Paraskevi, built on the edge of the Vikos Gorge. The monastery was founded in 1412 by Michael Voevodas Therianos and the people of Vitsa, as stated on an inscription, during the reign of Carlo I Tocco. It was a property of the monastery of St Elias but was refounded as a nunnery in 1778. The panoramic view from the monastery is spectacular.

Because of its scenery and traditional architecture Monodendri attracts some tourism, especially during the Christmas period.

== Notable Monodendrites ==
- The national benefactors Manthos and Georgios Rizaris, founders of the Rizareios Foundation in Athens in 1841 and of the Rizareios Ecclesiastical School in 1844, while Monodendri was still under Ottoman rule.
- Ioannis Koniaris, mayor of Athens in the 19th century.
- Dimitrios Semitelos (1828–1898), scholar.
- Anastasios Tagis (1839-1900), scholar and teacher.

== See also ==
- Vikos–Aoös National Park
