= Vitsa =

Village in Zagori, Greece

Vitsa Βίτσα
- Community

- Location within Greece
- Coordinates: 39°52.4′N 20°45.1′E
- Country: Greece
- Administrative region: Epirus
- Regional unit: Ioannina
- Municipality: Zagori
- Municipal unit: Central Zagori
- Elevation: 955 m (3,133 ft)

Population (2021)
  - Community: 82
- Time zone: UTC+2 (EET)
  - Summer (DST): UTC+3 (EEST)
- Postal code: 440 07
- Vehicle registration: ΙΝ

Vitsa (Greek: Βίτσα, Aromanian: Vezitsa) is one of the largest villages of the central Zagori region, in northwestern Greece. It is situated at an altitude of 955m on a mountain slope near the Vikos gorge with roads linking it to Greek National Road 6. Vitsa is famous for its old double-arched bridge of Missios. Vitsa is located on a hill and straddles both sides of two streams which flow through the village.

== Name ==
The village was recorded as Vezitsa in a document from 1361; its possession by the feudal lord John Tzafa Orsini was confirmed by the Serbian ruler Simeon Uroš. The village name is also rendered as Veitsa. The toponym is derived from the Slavic běgъ meaning 'flight'; verbs from this root include běgati/bězati 'run, flee or flow' and the suffix -ica, where the Slavic g shifted to ž before i. The toponym was rendered as Vezitsa and Vizitsa in northern Greek phonetics; the form Veitsa was produced by the dissimilatory loss of z; it later developed into Viitsa in Greek and eventually through the simplification of i became Vitsa.

== History ==
During ancient times, Zagori was inhabited by the Molossians. Excavations in the location Genitsari near Vitsa led to the discovery of a settlement possibly of the Tymphaeans or the Molossians dated to the 9th until the 4th century BC. There were signs of the foundations of small buildings from the archaic (geometric) and classical periods and a graveyard with at least 140 graves that contained coins, pottery and weaponry.

The establishment of the village of Vitsa is referred to in other documents from 1321 to 1361, under the name of Vezitsa. Some buildings from Byzantine times are still preserved. The village is divided by a chasm in two districts that were once different villages called Ano Vitsa and Kato Vitsa (Upper and Lower Vitsa). These two villages were always considered, along with Monodendri, as more or less one village, due to their small distance.

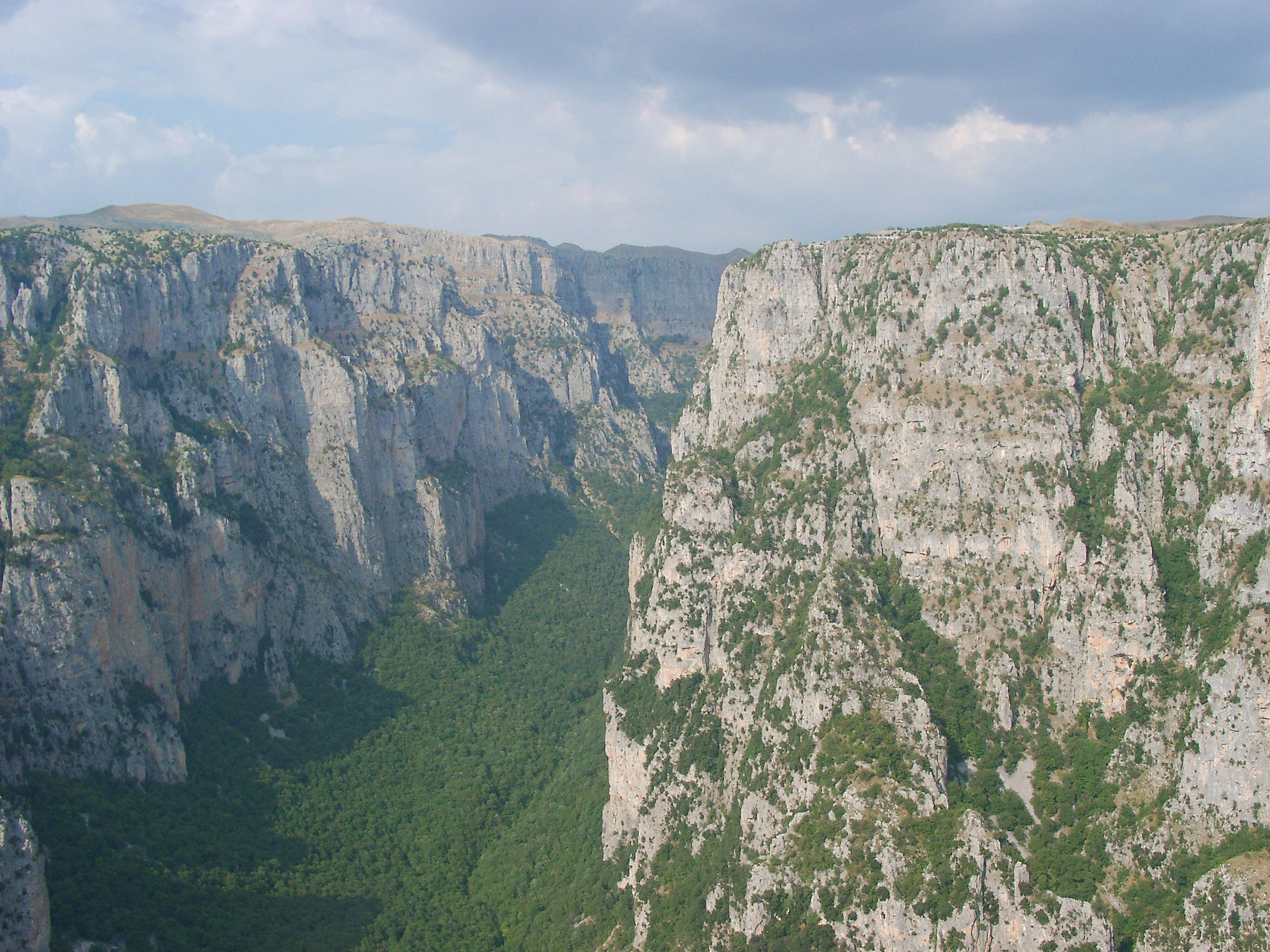
The Vikos gorge, near Vitsa

After 1430, when the Ottomans conquered Ioannina, Vitsa and the rest of Zagori villages formed an autonomous federation, the Commons of the Zagorisians (Greek: Κοινόν των Ζαγορισίων). Further privileges were granted to the Commons of the Zagorisians due to the influence of Phanariot Zagorisians over the court of the Sultan, and were preserved until 1868. According to these privileges, Zagori was autonomous and self-governed under the surveillance of the Vekylis of Zagori. Another important privilege that the Zagorians had was the freedom to practice their Christian faith. The absence of direct Ottoman rule helped the inhabitants attain a good standard of living. The main source of income in the 18th and 19th centuries was from remittances from expatriates, as elsewhere in Zagori.

Vitsa became a cultural center for the Zagori region and was the birthplace of people such as the Sarros family (among them politicians and engineers involved at the Suez Canal works in the 19th century) and Nikolaidis (man of literature).

Since the 17th century and until World War II, (when Zagorisian traditional emigration ended), most people from Vitsa would emigrate to Egypt, Asia Minor and the United States. Inside geographical Greece, they mostly emigrated to Macedonia.

== Demographics ==
The village is inhabited by Greeks, and an Aromanian community along with Arvanite families who both have assimilated into the local population, and some Sarakatsani who settled in the village during the early 20th century. The arrival of Orthodox Albanians (locally called "Arvanites") occurred in the modern period and originate from the wider Souli area in central Greek Epirus, while the Sarakatsani are Greek speakers.

== Buildings ==
In addition to the double arched bridge of Missios (built in 1748 AD), there is the church of Agios Georgios or of the Taxiarches from 1607 AD, the church of Agios Nikolaos (1612 AD, with well preserved frescoes), the church of the Dormition of the Virgin (Κοιμήσεως της Θεοτόκου) from 1554 (repaired in 1720–1728) in Lower Vitsa, the manors of Belogiannis, Vasdekis and Skevis and the Vrizopouleios School. The church of the Stavropegiac Monastery of Prophetes Elias (1632) survives in the north of Vitsa. It was founded upon an older foundation of a small 14th-century church of the Transfiguration of Christ.

== Folklore ==
Vitsa celebrates the Feast of the Dormition of the Virgin (15 August).

== Notable people ==
- Matthaios Paranikas (1832–1914), scholar, writer and teacher
- Dimitrios Sarros (1869/70-1937), scholar, writer, soldier and teacher
