= Greeks in Bulgaria =

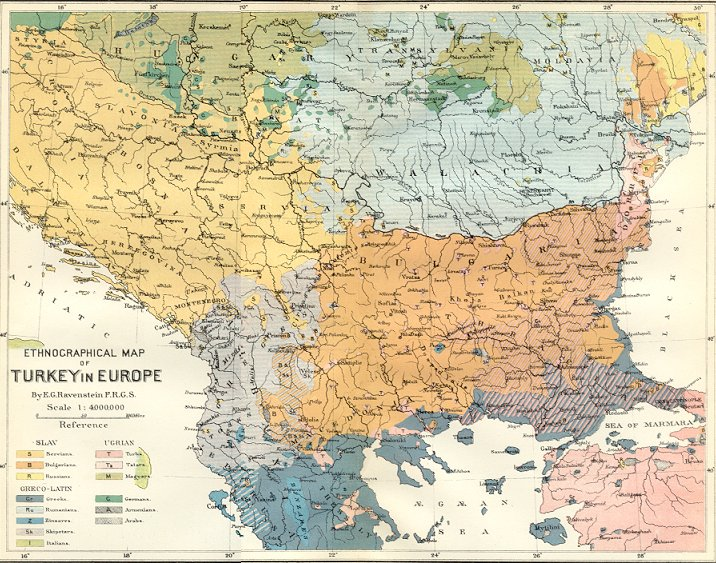
Ethnic map of Southeastern Europe from 1880 (Greeks in blue)

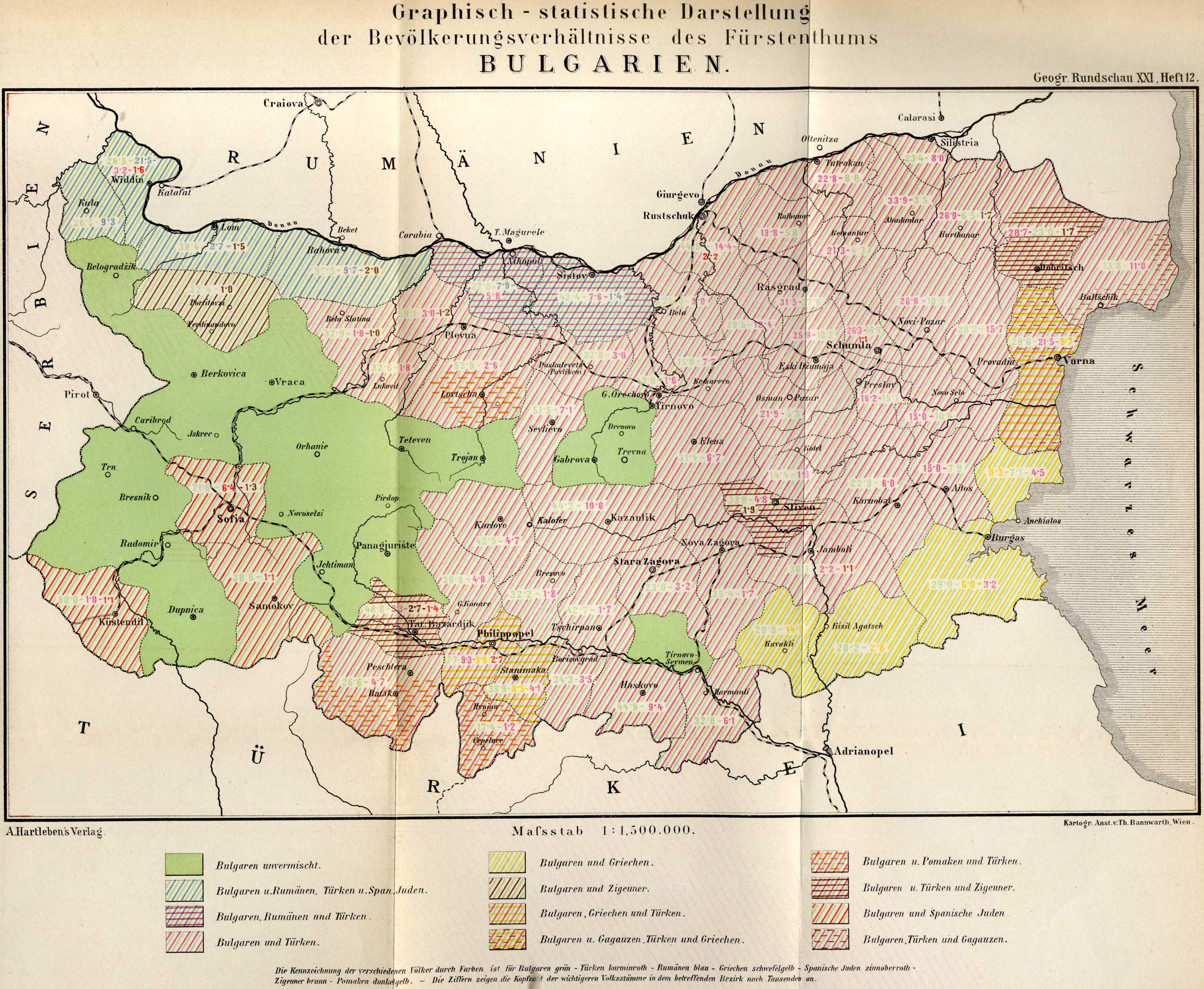
Ethnic map of Bulgaria according to the census results from 1892 (Greek minority areas in yellow)

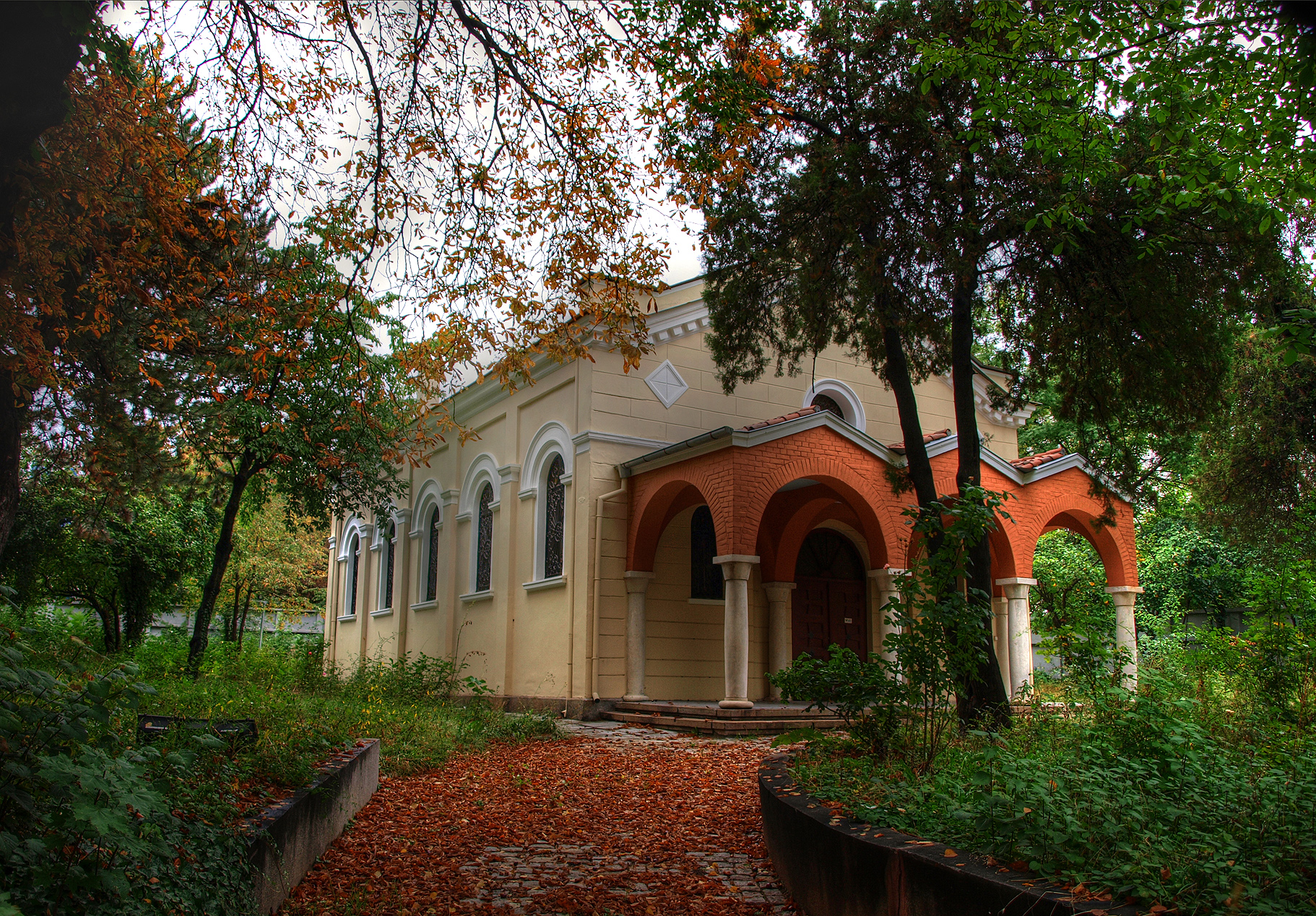
Greek Orthodox Church of Saint George in Sofia, Bulgaria

Greeks in Bulgaria (Bulgarian: гърци Gǎrci) constitute the eighth-largest ethnic minority in Bulgaria (Greek: Βουλγαρία Voulgaria). They number 1,356 according to the 2011 census. They are estimated at around 25,000 by Greek organizations and around 28,500 by the Greek government. These larger estimates include the Sarakatsani community, the descendants of the post-WWII Greek emigrants, and other Greek citizens living in Bulgaria as students, businessmen, consorts etc. Today, Greeks mostly live in the large urban centres like Sofia and Plovdiv, but also in the coastal zone.

== History ==
Historically, the presence of a Greek population in what is today Bulgaria dates to the 7th century BC, when Milesians and Dorians founded thriving Greek colonies on the Bulgarian Black Sea Coast, often on the site of earlier Thracian settlements. Maritime poleis like Nesebar (Μεσημβρία Mesembria), Sozopol (Απολλωνία Apollonia), Pomorie (Αγχίαλος Ankhialos) and Varna (Οδησσός Odessos) controlled the trade routes in the western part of the Black Sea and often waged wars between each other.

Prior to the early 20th century, there was a small Greek minority in Southeastern Bulgaria, living largely between Varna to the north, Topolovgrad to the west and the Black Sea to the east, with a scattered rural population in the inland regions of the Strandzha and Sakar mountains. The Greek-inhabited places in Strandzha and Sakar were the towns of Topolovgrad (Greek: Καβακλί, Kavakli) and Elhovo (Greek: Κιζίλ Αγάτς, Kizil Agats), and 10 villages in that area. However, a large part of this population, the so-called Kariots (Greek: Καρυώτες), is regarded by some ethnographers (including Konstantin Josef Jireček) as having been only Greek-identifying, but of Bulgarian origin. Raymond Detrez deems this theory improbable, since the Kariots are a rural population. Greek communities also existed in Plovdiv (Greek: Φιλιππούπολη, Filippoupoli), Sofia (Greek: Σόφια, Sofia), Asenovgrad (Greek: Στενήμαχος, Stenimachos), Haskovo (Greek: Χάσκοβο, Chaskovo), and Rousse (Greek: Ρούσε, Rouse), among others. In 1900, the Greeks in Bulgaria numbered 33,650.

Following the anti-Greek tensions in Bulgaria in 1906 and the Politis–Kalfov (1924) and Mollov–Kafantaris (1927) population exchange agreements after World War I, the bulk of the Greek-speaking population in Bulgaria was forced to leave for Greece and was substituted by Bulgarians from Western Thrace and Greek Macedonia. Among the few exceptions were some of the Sarakatsani, mainly in Sliven (Greek: Σλίβεν, Sliven) and Kotel (Greek: Κότελ, Kotel), estimated at 4,107 in 2006 and a small group of Greek speakers with Bulgarian self-consciousness. This group, living in Suvorovo (Greek: Κοζλουτζά or Σουβόροβο, Kozloutza or Souvorovo), and two nearby villages, according to the Bulgarian ethnographer Anastas Angleov: "...They themselves used to say [to their Bulgarian-speaking neighbours]: We are Bulgarians, but we speak Greek...".

== Culture ==
From the 19th century the Greek communities on the coastal areas were thriving as they financed and maintained several religious and cultural buildings and institutions: churches, schools of all grades, libraries and press. Until the early 20th century, there were a total of 117 churches and 8 monasteries maintained by Greeks in Bulgarian territory, while a number of Greek dioceses were located in coastal cities and in particular in Pomorie, Varna, Nesebar and Sozopol. The most prosperous communities were that of Varna, with seven Greek schools that hosted ca. 1,200–1,500 students in 1907, and of Plovdiv, with a total of eight schools. Among them, the Zariphios in Plovdiv, established at 1875, became one of the most well known Greek educational institutions of the region.

== Census data ==
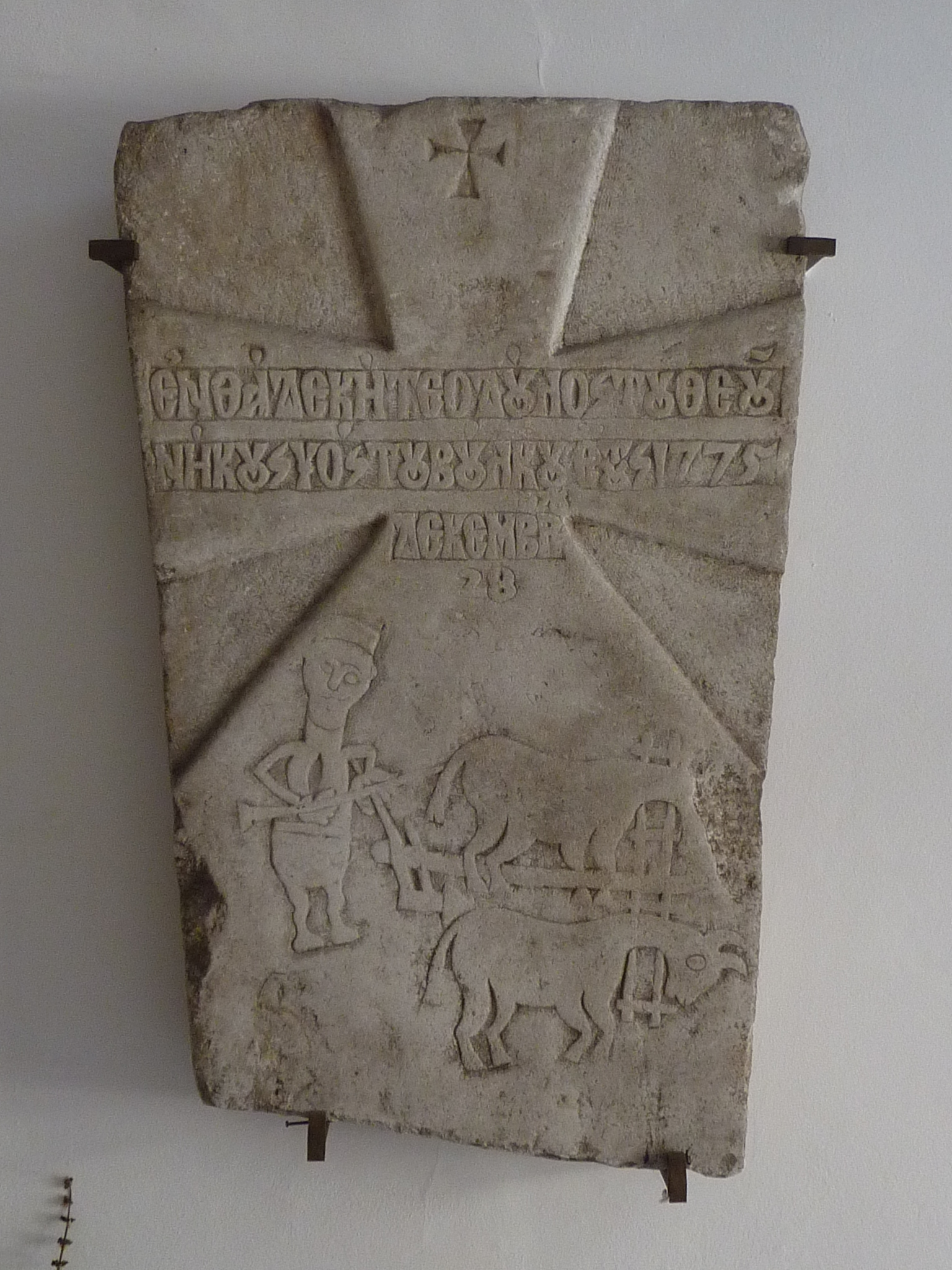
A Greek tombstone from 1775 (Burgas Archaeological Museum)

Year	Greek Population	Percentage of total
1881/1884	65,756	2.2
1887	58,326	1.85
1892	58,518	1.77
1900	70,887	1.89
1905	69,761	1.73
1910	50,886	1.17
1920	46,759	0.96
1926	10,564	0.19
1934	9,601	0.16
1956	7,437	0.10
1965	8.241	0.10
1992	4.930	0.06
2001	3,219	0.04
2011	1,356	0.02

== Notable Greeks from Bulgaria ==
- Georgios Kleovoulos (c. 1785–1828), scholar and educator, from Plovdiv
- Anastasios Polyzoidis (1802–1873), politician born in Melnik
- Vlasios Skordelis (1835-1898), writer born in Asenovgrad
- Christos Tsountas (1857–1913), archaeologist, from Asenovgrad
- Filippos Nikoglou (1871–1953), doctor and Greek patriot, from Asenovgrad
- Christos Tsigiridis (1877–1947), electrical engineer and technological pioneer
- Konstantinos Dimitriadis (1879–1943), sculptor born in Asenovgrad
- Kostas Varnalis (1884–1974), poet born in Burgas (Pyrgos)
- Giorgios Gounaropoulos (1890–1977), artist born in Sozopol
- Apostolos Nikolaidis (1896–1980), athlete and Panathinaikos legend, from Plovdiv (Philippoupoli)
- Constantinos Apostolou Doxiadis (1913–1975), architect born in Asenovgrad
- Tomas Lafchis (b. 1958), football goalkeeper and businessman
- Vicky Almazidu (b. 1956), jazz singer who sings with Milcho Leviev
- Giorgos Manthatis (b. 1997), footballer born in Sofia
- Nikolaos Tsitiridis (b. 1994), comedian, writer and late-night talk show host (Bulgarian mother)

== See also ==
- Immigration to Bulgaria
- Bulgarians in Greece
- Grecomans
- Eastern Rumelia
- Bulgaria-Greece relations
- Sarakatsani
- Nestinarstvo
- Zariphios School
- Lyalevo
