= Bulgaria–Greece relations =

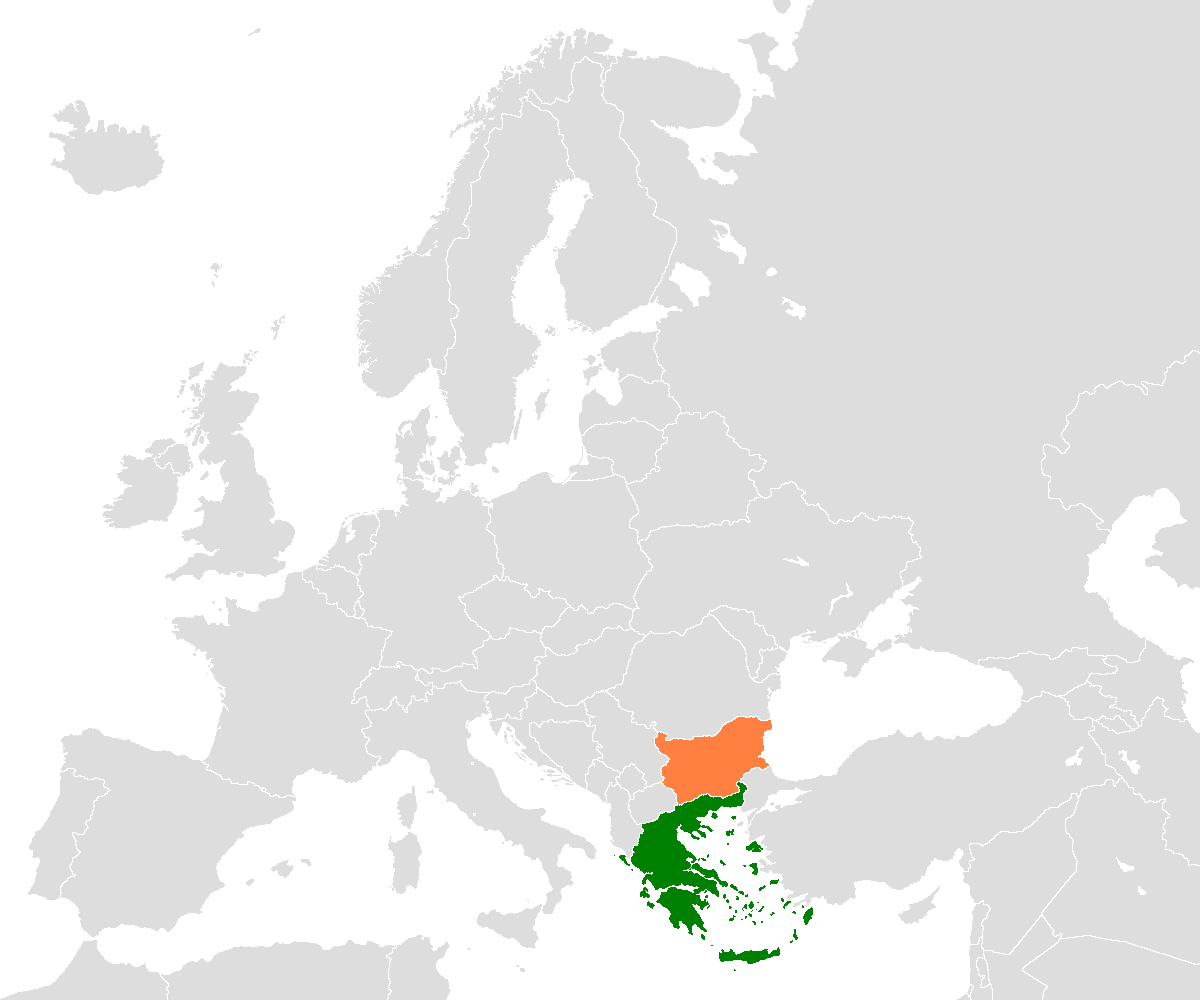

- Greece: Bulgaria

Diplomatic mission
- Embassy of Greece, Sofia: Embassy of Bulgaria, Athens

Bulgaria–Greece relations are the bilateral relations between the Republic of Bulgaria and the Hellenic Republic.

Due to the strong political, cultural and religious ties between the two nations, Bulgaria and Greece today enjoy healthy diplomatic relations and consider each other a friendly nation and an ally.

Greece is a strong supporter of Bulgaria's Euro-Atlantic integration. Bulgaria and Greece share common political views about the Balkans, the enlargement plans of the European Union and the rest of the world, with Bulgaria having been a supporter of Greece's stance on the Macedonia naming dispute. Modern relations between the two countries were established in 1908 and are regarded as excellent despite the Axis occupation of Greece by Bulgaria, Italy and Germany during World War II. Both countries are full members of the Council of Europe, the European Union and NATO.

== History ==
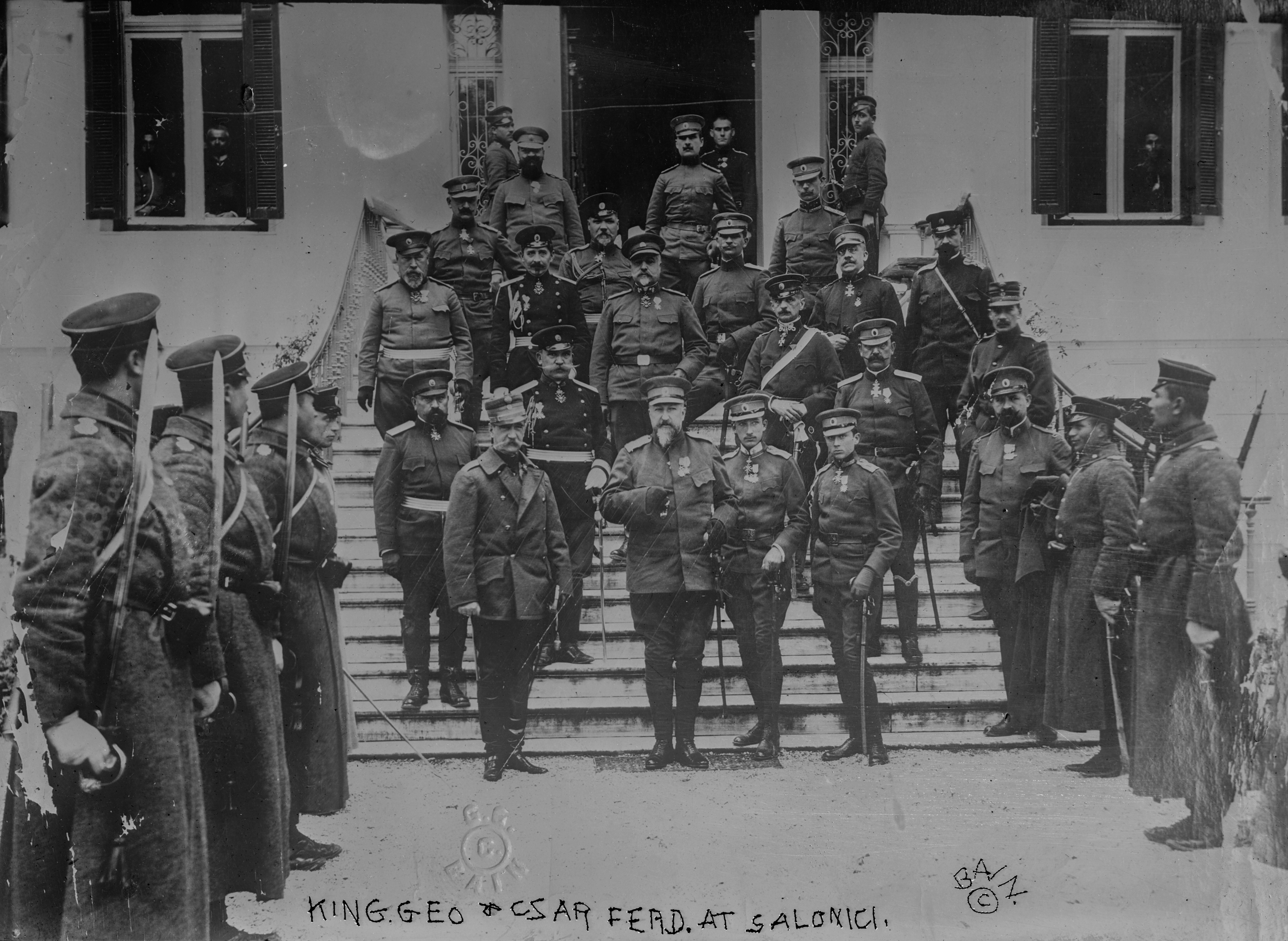
King George I of Greece visiting Tsar Ferdinand I of Bulgaria at the headquarters of the Bulgarian army, city of Thessaloniki, during the First Balkan War.

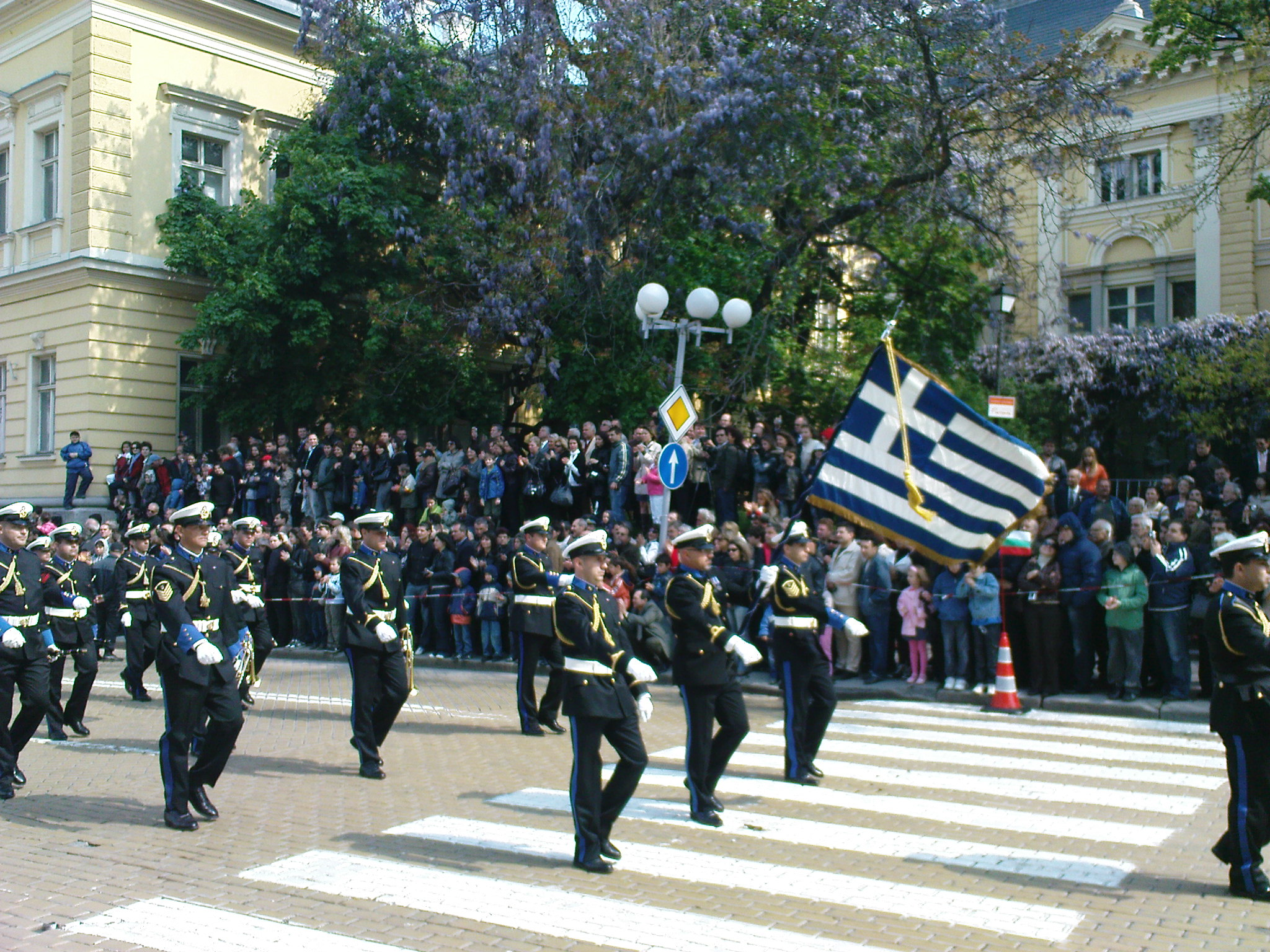
The Hellenic Navy band participating in the Army Day parade in Sofia in 2009

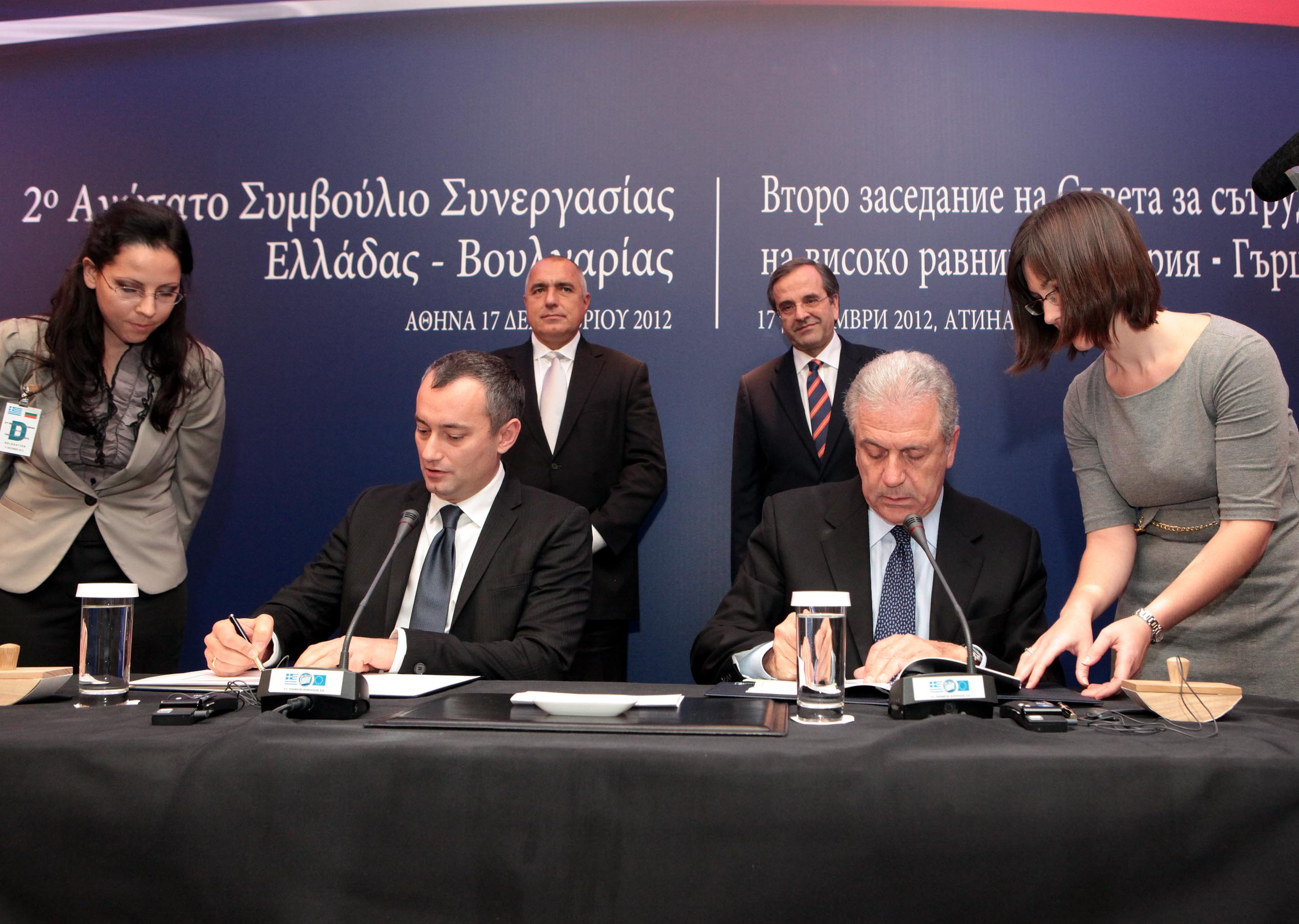
Second Upper Cooperation Council between Greece and Bulgaria in December 2012.

The common heritage of both nations played a significant role in the close relations between the two countries, ever since the Medieval Ages, between Southern Slavs and Byzantine Greeks (the Byzantine Empire played a prominent role in spreading of the Orthodox Christianity to Bulgaria and the rest of the Balkans). The missionaries Cyril and Methodius from the city of Thessalonica were the founders of the Glagolitic script and the first literary language of the Slavs, from which the modern Bulgarian Language evolved.

Between the late 14th century and the early 15th century, both Bulgaria and Greece came under Ottoman rule for nearly five centuries. During this period the Bulgarian Patriarchate was abolished and the Patriarch of Constantinople was declared by the Ottoman Sultan as the spiritual leader of all the Orthodox Christians in the Ottoman Empire, regardless of their ethnicity. In the 19th century the Bulgarians began a struggle for the restoration of an independent Bulgarian church, which was met with stiff opposition by the Constantinople Patriarchy. While the Bulgarian Orthodox Church was restored in 1872, the Ecumenical Patriarchate, refused to recognize it until much later, in 1945, and especially after the collapse of the Ottoman Empire and the end of the Balkan and World Wars.

In the earlier 20th century the relations were affected by periods of intense mutual hostility. Since Bulgaria's independence in 1908, Greece and Bulgaria took part in three major wars in opposite coalitions, the Second Balkan War (although they were allies at the First Balkan War), the First World War and the Second World War, plus the Cold War, and they even fought a "Stray dog war" in 1925.

After the World War II, the relations between Greece and Bulgaria have been flourishing, and as the Greek President Konstantinos Tsatsos said during the Bulgarian leader Todor Zhivkov's visit to Athens in April 1976, "the old controversies have been forgotten and the hatchet buried forever". Greece became a firm supporter of Bulgaria's EU membership and was the fifth EU member state and the first old member state to ratify the Accession Treaty. Since Bulgaria joined NATO in May 2004, Greek-Bulgarian relations have been developing on all fronts, and the Greek Ministry of Foreign Affairs describes relations between Greece and Bulgaria as "excellent".

In 2018, declassified documents of the Communist Bulgaria revealed a plan to foment crisis between Turkey and Greece in 1971. The operation codenamed "Cross" and the plan was that Bulgarian secret agents would set fire on the Ecumenical Patriarchate of Constantinople and make it look like the work of Turks. The declassified documents state that "[a]n intervention" in the religious entity would have "significantly damage[d] Turkish-Greek relations and force[d] the United States to choose one side in the ensuing crisis". In addition, the Bulgarians also planned to boost the effect of its operation against Greece and Turkey by conducting "active measures […] for putting the enemy in a position of delusion." The plan was developed by the 7th Department of the First Main Directorate of the DS (intelligence and secret police services of communist Bulgaria), and was affirmed by Deputy Head of the Directorate on 16 November 1970, and approved by its Head. The operation was supposed to be prepared by the middle of 1971 and then executed, but it was abandoned.

== Bilateral relations and cooperation ==
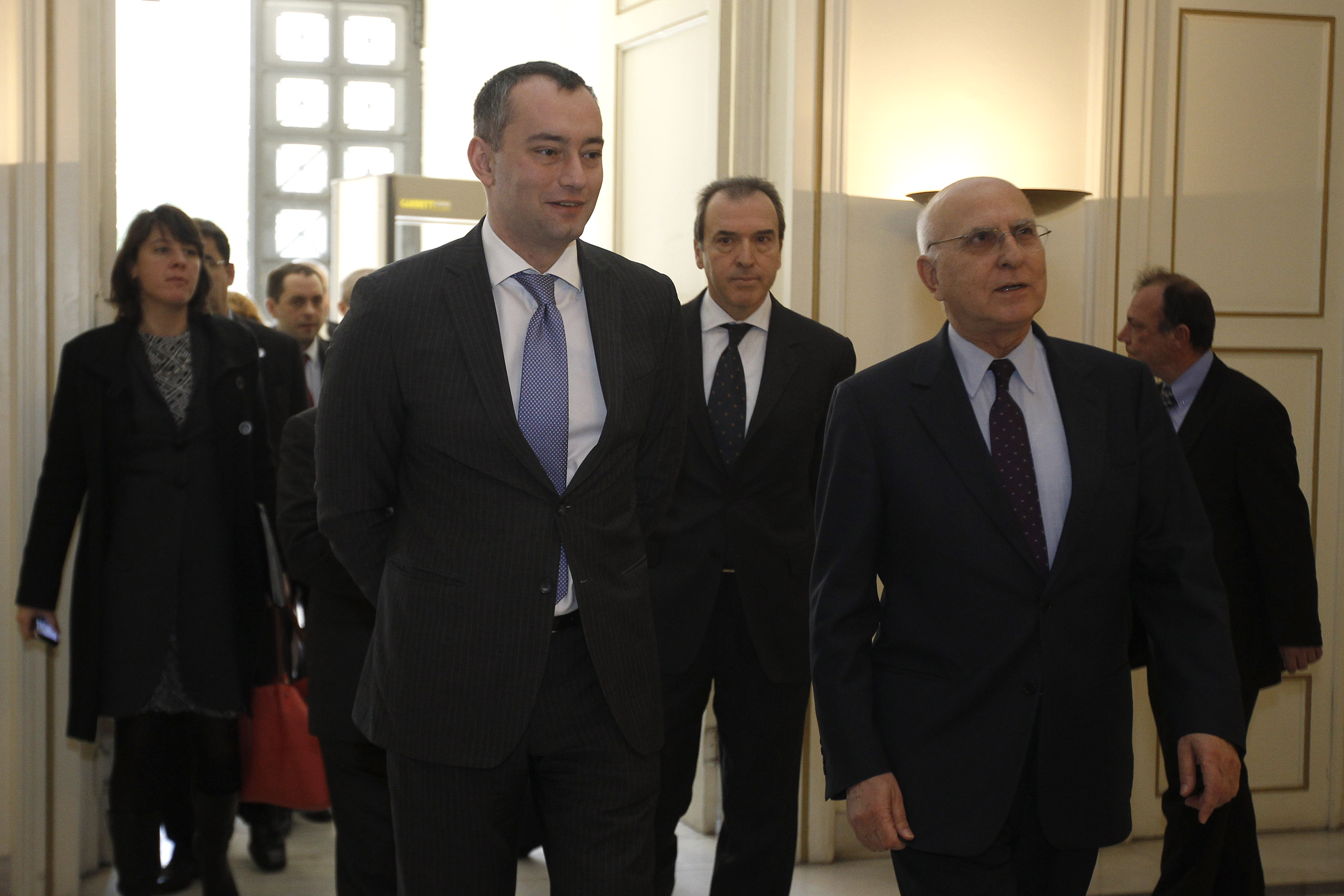
Greek Foreign Minister Stavros Dimas and Bulgarian Foreign Minister Nickolay Mladenov.

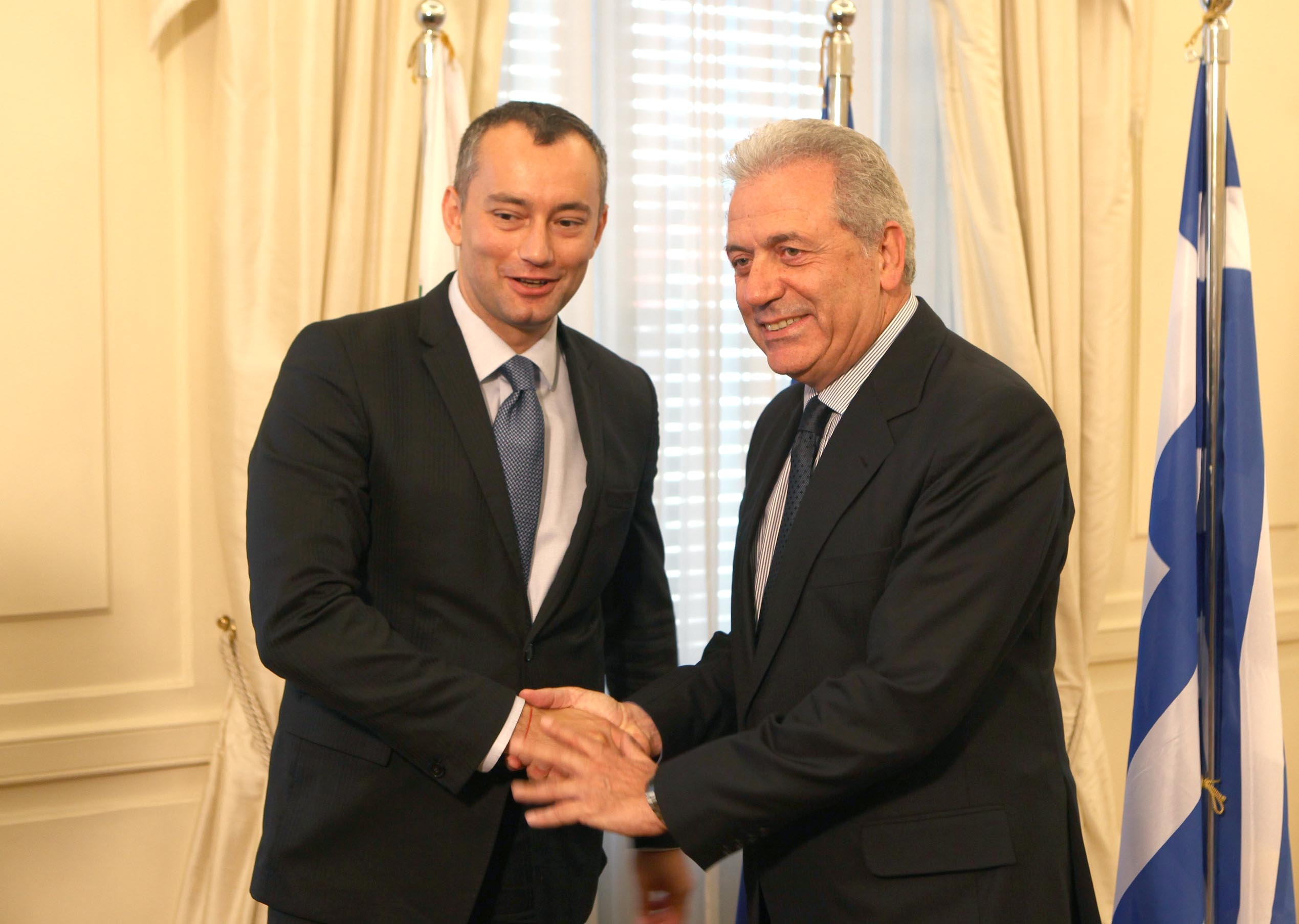
Official visit of Bulgarian President Rosen Plevneliev in Greece. Foreign Minister Dimitris Avramopoulos met at the Foreign Ministry, the Bulgarian Foreign Minister Nickolay Mladenov in July 2012.

Diplomatic relations were established in 1908. Bulgaria has an embassy in Athens and Greece has an embassy in Sofia. Greece is the top investor and one of Bulgaria's main trade partners. Both states are co-operating in many fields, such as political, judicial, energy and tourism. There are regular high-level visits between the two countries, and frequent contacts between the two countries' governments and the local authorities on various matters concerning individual sectors, such as the control of flow of the Maritsa River (also known as Evros) of which the overflow during times of strong rainfall, threatens the towns and villages in the regions it flows through. Big projects currently in running between the two countries include the touristic development and the gas pipelines. Official meetings between the two governments and the Presidents of the State are frequent and the armies of both states cooperate and are co-training in a regular basis as part of the NATO training programme.

== Educational cooperation ==
Greek and Bulgarian university professors created the "Hellenic Educational Association of Sofia" after the collapse of communism in Bulgaria, which assists the Bulgarian students who learn Greek. Also the "Federation of Cultural and Educational Associations of Karakatsani of Bulgaria" helps the 15,000 Sarakatsani in receiving education on Greek language and culture. There are more than 2,000 Greek university students in Bulgaria, which constitutes one of the largest groups of foreign university students in Bulgaria.

== Diasporas ==
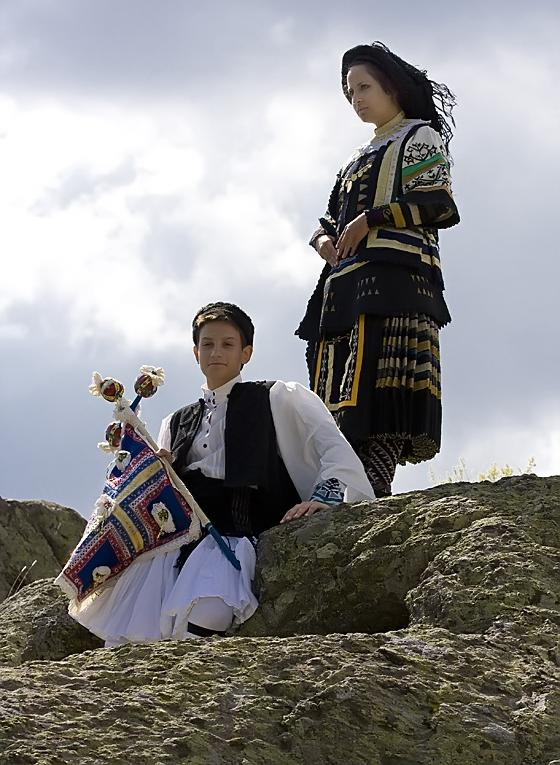
Sarakatsani in Kotel, Bulgaria.

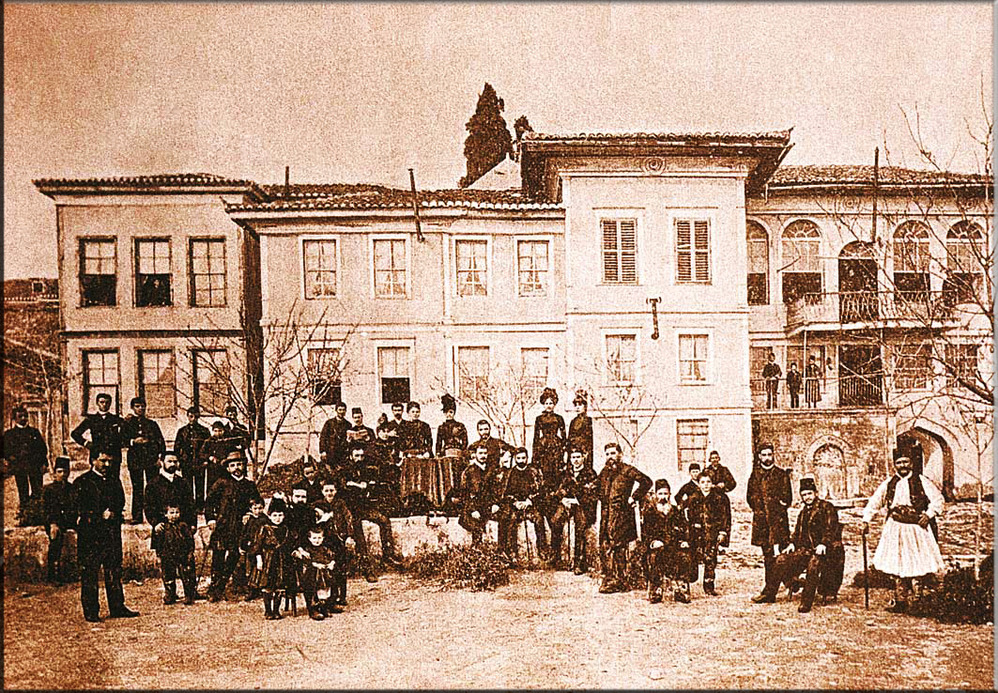
The Bulgarian Men's High School of Thessaloniki in Thessaloniki, operated from 1880 to 1913.

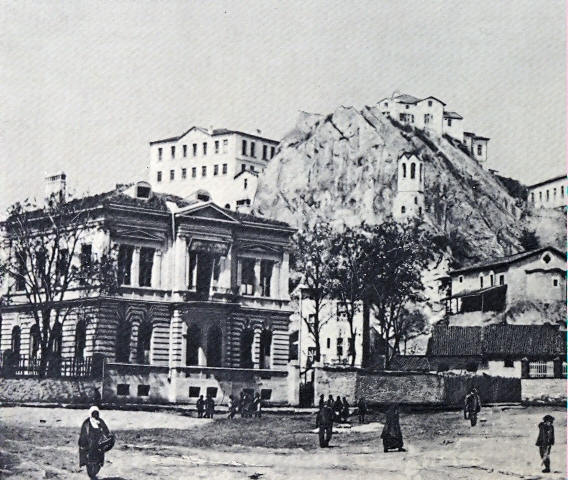
Greek language Zariphios School in Plovdiv, operated from 1875 to 1906.

Historically, there have been sizable Greek and Bulgarian communities in the territories which form present day Bulgaria and Greece respectively. These communities today are significantly decreased due to the population exchanges between Greece and Bulgaria which were directed under the Treaty of Neuilly in 1919.

In 1900, Greeks were about 80,000 (2% of the Bulgarian population) and despite its small size the minority was prominent in the commercial activities and visible in the cultural life.

According to the 2001 census, there were 35,104 Bulgarian citizens in Greece, constituting 4,7% of all foreigners in Greece. However, that number has risen since then, as in 2003–2004, Bulgarians accounted for 9,8% of residence permit holders in Greece, out of which 473 were students and 2,059 were married to EU nationals. In the academic year 2002–2003, there were 2,873 non-ethnic Greek citizens of Bulgaria in Greek state schools. There are numerous publications in Greece for the Bulgarian community, including the bilingual newspaper България днес/Βουλγαρία σήμερα (Bulgaria today).

According to the 2001 census, there were 3,408 Greeks in Bulgaria. This figure most likely includes, former political refugees, remnants of the population exchanges, students, and businessmen and their families. In addition, there were 4,108 Sarakatsani.

== Agreements ==
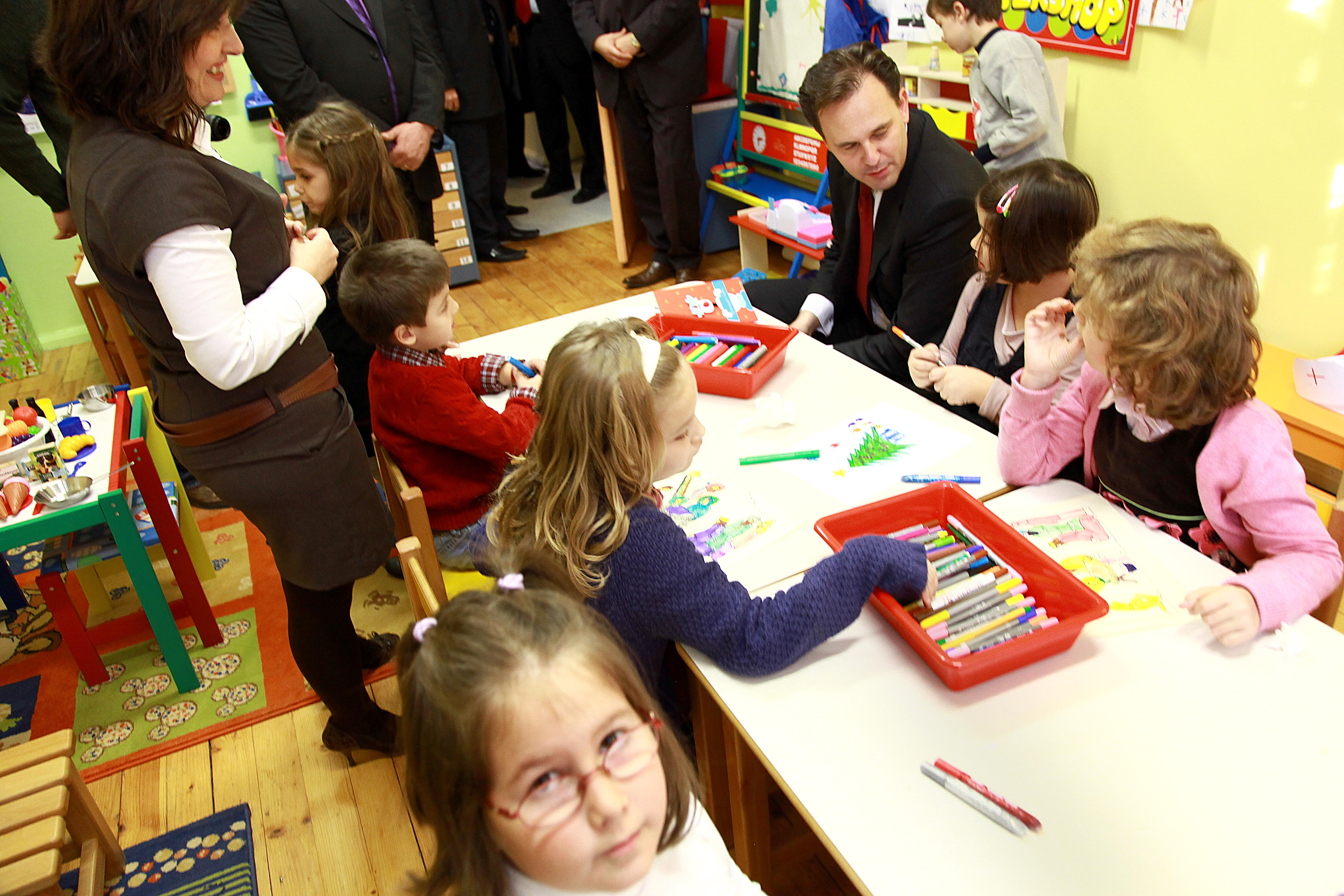
Dimitrios Droutsas visit to Greek Educational Center in Sofia, December 2012.

The main Inter-State Agreements signed over the past 15 years are as follows:

- Avoidance of Double Taxation on Income and Capital (Athens, 15/2/1991)
- Police Cooperation (covering clandestine immigration, terrorism, organised crime, and police training) (Athens, 8/7/1991)
- Cooperation between Ministries of Defence and Armed Forces (Athens, 28/11/1991)
- Agreement on Seasonal Workers (Athens, 15/12/1995)
- Agreement on the Waters of the River Nestos (Sofia 22/12/1995)
- Agreement on the Opening of Three New Border Posts and Arterial Road Links between the two countries (Sofia 22/12/1995)
- Military and Technical Cooperation (March 1998)
- Scientific, Educational and Cultural Agreement (Sofia 12/6/2002) (in application of Article 13 of the Bilateral Cultural Agreement (Athens, 31/05/1973)
- Five-Year Development Cooperation Agreement within the framework of the HIBERB (development Aid to Bulgaria of 54,29 million euros) (28/08/2002)
- Bilateral Environmental Protection Agreement (Athens, 01/11/2002)
- Aviation Agreement (Athens, 01/11/2002)
- Scientific and Technological Cooperation Protocol (Athens, December 2002)

== Diplomacy ==
Republic of Bulgaria

- Athens (Embassy)
- Thessaloniki (Consulate-General)

Republic of Greece

- Sofia (Embassy)

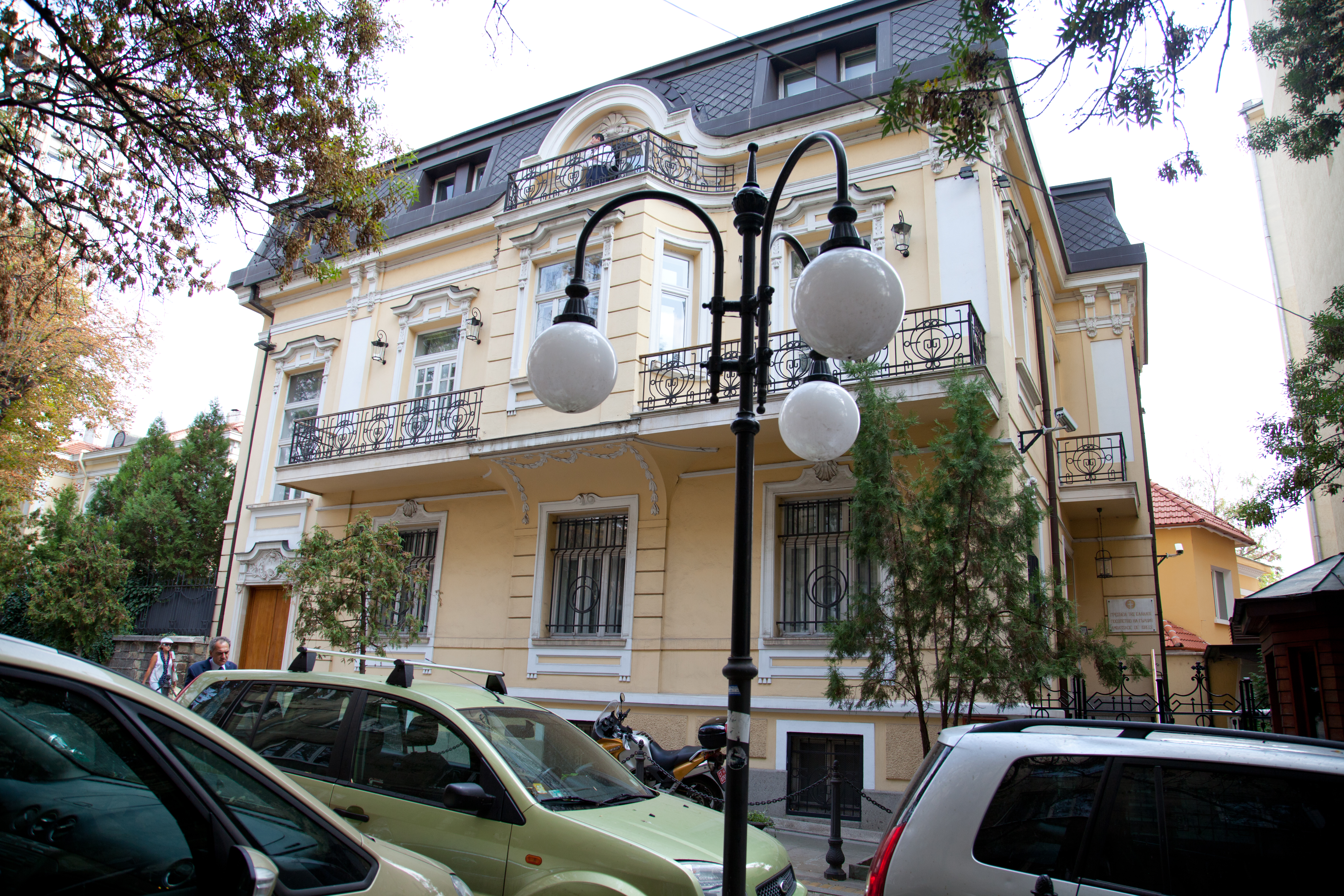
Embassy of Greece in Sofia

== Border ==
The Bulgaria–Greece border, which is Greece's longest border and Bulgaria's second-longest border, was established in 1919. A 15 to 45 km deep surveillance zone was established.

== See also ==
- Balkan Battlegroup
- Bulgarians in Greece
- Greeks in Bulgaria
- Foreign relations of Bulgaria
- Foreign relations of Greece
- Sarakatsani
