= Zagoritis =

Zagoritis is a surname (Greek: Ζαγορίτης) related to the region of Zagori. Notable people with the surname include:

- Adrian Zagoritis (born 1968), British songwriter and record producer
- Lefteris Zagoritis (born 1956), Greek lawyer and politician
