= Semperviva =

- Type: Foundation
- Founded: 1997
- Headquarters: Pernik
- Area served: Bulgaria

The Bulgarian Biodiversity Preservation Society, Semperviva, is a non-governmental, biodiversity conservation organization. Semperviva was founded in 1997, and works in close partnership with the Balkani Wildlife society. A project house in Vlahi provides the Balkani Wildlife society with a base from which to undertake biological field research on large carnivores, and also provides accommodation for volunteers. Semperviva is a network partner of the European SAVE Foundation.

== Objectives ==
Semperviva is focused on studying and saving the rare autochthonic breeds of domestic animals in Bulgaria and also on the Balkan region. Specific goals include:

- investigation the status of rare and endangered breeds
- monitoring of breed populations
- classification and standardization of autochthonic breeds
- maintenance of herd books
- efforts for legal status improvement
- on farm and in situ conservation
- promotion and conservation of the cultural heritage, traditions and customs of native people
- promoting public awareness (by organizing exhibitions of rare indigenous breeds)

== Karakachan breeds conservation project ==
Conservation of Karakachan sheep, Karakachan horse and Karakachan dog in Bulgaria.

Since fifteen years, The Bulgarian Biodiversity Preservation Society, Semperviva, has been active for the breed of Karakachan livestock guardian dogs. They are successful utilised for the protection of herds against bears and wolves which appear still frequently in Bulgaria. For seven years, Semperviva has also been active for the conservation of the endangered Karakachan sheep and Karakachan horses. The old Karakachan breeds are one of the oldest forms of domestic animals in Europe. They are also the connection between the modern high-productive breeds and their wild predecessors. The three breeds are part of the natural, cultural and historical heritage of Bulgaria. The main goal of these projects is: saving the traditional way of their breeding as a symbiosis among them and their living environment.

The long-term project started in the beginning of 2001 and is supported by: The SAVE Foundation, Frankfurt Zoological Society and private donors. The Karakachan sheep, Karakachan horse and Karakachan dog are local breeds, which had been formed on the Bulgarian lands, as a result of the most primitive type of livestock breeding – nomad livestock breeding. The Karakachans are Balkan nomad people who, due to their extremely conservative livestock breeding traditions, are considered to have saved the most primitive and pure domesticated forms of animals – a sheep type "tzakel", a mountain horse and a livestock guardian dog.

Although The project for saving the three Karakachan breeds is initiated by the BBPS – Semperviva. Different agencies and institutions are involved in this project. Main partners of BBPS – Semperviva are local private farmers from Kresna municipality in Pirin mountain and the Balkani Wildlife society. The Pirin National Park administration is going to provide in kind support to the project. Here you can read more about the karakachan projects and here you can read more about the —United Nations Development Programme— for Bulgarian projects.

=== Karakachan sheep ===
The Balkan Peninsula is covered with the marks of different ethnic groups who have, over the centuries, spent time in the area. This is reflected in the richness of the many physical and geographical attributes—also in the many different breeds.

The Karakachan sheep is accepted as the most typical and most primitive, coarse wool sheep type "tzakel" in Bulgaria. This was proved by the craniometrical research of Balevska, Petrov (1967). According to the same authors this sheep is closest to the European mouflon (Ovis musimon). The Karakachan sheep is small (about 57 cm at withers), the short and thin tail is typical sign of the breed. Its wool is coarse and long (up to 26 cm). The coloration is grey-black and brown-black, but very seldom white. Very vital and energetic animal, very tough, almost never being ill, very unpretentious towards the food source. Highly developed feeling for being in a flock. Low productivity of litters (100 – 102%). The Karakachan sheep had been one of the most widespread breeds in Bulgaria in the past. In the beginning of the 20th century the population size had been more than 500 000 individuals. In 1957, during the nationalization of the farming practice, the number is decreased to 158 896 individuals. At that time the socialist government decided to replace the local breeds of sheep with foreign, fine-fleeced. As a consequence of the state policy the local breeds had been massively crossbred with other breeds. There are other factors which threaten the breed. The alpine pastures in the country are hardly used. But if the Karakachan sheep is bred in lower mountainous lands it has lower productivity compared with other breeds. At the moment the mountain livestock breeding is a losing practice. The government does not stimulate private livestock breeders to keep and work with autochthon breeds. Semperviva has already bought and secured 37 of the remaining Karakachan sheep.

The project is advised by the SAVE Foundation and financed by 'Fondation pour les Animaux du Monde, Vaduz/Liechtenstein.

=== Karakachan horse ===
The Karakachan horse was the most consolidated breed from all the local primitive horses. This is due to the very conservative livestock breeding traditions of karakachan nomads. They had used these horses for transportation of their whole household, during the seasonal migrations. The pasture had been the only food for those animals. The horses which had not been currently used by people had stayed all year round high in the mountain in groups taking care about themselves. Even during cold winters they had found food and protected themselves from predators. Each Karakachan man had owned 50-100 horses in the past. In 1940s this number was decreased to 10-15 and seldom 50 animals from which 5 – 10 breeding mares from old breeding lines. In 1957-58 after the government took away the livestock from private owners, the Karakachan horses have not been in use by the state farms anymore. They had been just killed or exported for meat (mostly to Italy). Attempts have been made in the state farms to "improve" the breed by crossbreeding with Hucul, Kabardin or Kabarda and Haflinger. Till now the government does not have policy to save the aboriginal breeds of horses. There is no promotion of their valuable qualities. According to the Red Data List of autochthonic forms of domestic animals(1994) the Karakachan horse is put in category II – disappearing forms (or critical). The census made by the SEMPERVIVA project in 2002, registered 362 animals.

Read and see more about the Karakachan horse in this study from the Department of Animal Science – Non-Ruminant and Other Animals, Faculty of Agriculture, Trakia University.

=== Karakachan dog ===
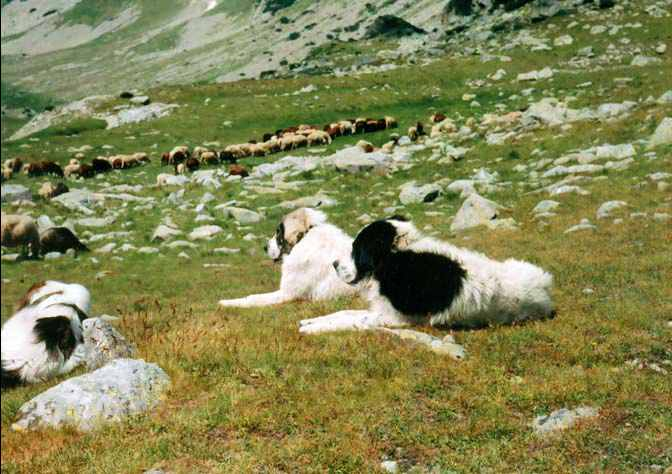
Karakachan dogs guarding the flock

The Karakachan dog is an ancient breed of livestock guarding dog. It originates from the shepherd dogs of the ancient Thracians and Asian Livestock guardian dogs of the proto-Bulgarians. Karakachan people had bred this dog conservatively and had formed its present type. Due to its perfect working qualities this breed has been widely used by shepherds in Bulgaria. Similarly to the above two breeds, the socialist regime almost manages to annihilate the Karakachan dog. Up to day the government has not supported the breed survival in any way, except including it in the Red Data List of the autochthonic forms of domestic animals as a disappearing breed (or critical). Semperviva started the work for saving the Karakachan dog in 1992. Since the beginning a breeding station has been established, where the breeding process is made on the base of aboriginal dogs. A breed standard and a herd book were worked out. An International Karakachan Dog Association was founded. Semperviva has always aimed to save this breed as a working dog with its original qualities. In this aspect, since 1997, in cooperation with the Balkani Wildlife Society, dogs have been provided to livestock breeders for protection of their flocks against predators. In this way it is aimed to decrease the conflict between people and large carnivores (wolves and bears) and to restore the breed in its natural environment. This particular project has been supported by several foundations in different years of its implementation: European Natural Heritage Fund – Euronatur, GzSW, UK Wolf Conservation Trust and Alertis. Thanks to these activities there is a slight trend of increase of working dogs. The three breeds, subject of the project have been selected by Karakachan people, which are ancient, autochthonic, ethnic group of nomad livestock breeders. The three breeds, which are one of the oldest in Europe, had been numerous in Bulgaria before the nationalization of the private property during the socialist regime. As a consequence of that time politics in the farming practice, these breeds have been massively crossbred with foreign more productive ones and also huge numbers of them have been exterminated without control. All this have brought these karakachan breeds to the edge of extinction. In addition, nowadays the mountain livestock breeding is a losing practice. The government does not actively stimulate private livestock breeders to keep and work with autochthonic breeds.

== Project results ==
In the frames of the project was achieved following results:

- Investigation of the available literature about the three breeds and collection of personal comments was done.
- Field investigations and census of the three breeds are conducted.
- A project base was built up.
- Herds of Karakachan sheep and Karakachan horse were established.
- Selection in direction to the old, original type and increasing the numbers is conducted.
- Traditional breeding using vertical, seasonal transhumant migration is practiced.
- Village and horse tourism are being developed.
- Public awareness activities were done.

== Goals for future action ==
The conservation measures that are needed for saving karakachan breeds could apply towards saving of all the autochthonic breeds in Bulgaria. Semperviva is thus working towards achieving the following points:

1. Creating legislation to enable conservation, as there is currently no legal basis for conservation of local breeds in Bulgaria.
2. Making an official distinction of the original old type of the autochthonic breeds from their "improved" types.
3. Establishing a genetic bank (of semen and embryos) for autochthonic breeds.
4. The government should stimulate the use of alpine pastures and the seasonal migrations as more environmentally friendly and as traditional for the old autochthonic breeds.
5. Changing the time at which government subsidies for the National gene fund are given. Currently this money is given in spring, which Semperviva feels is wrong time of the year. Semperviva believes that this is when the forage is most expensive and the owners do not need subsidies at this time.

== See also ==
- SAVE Foundation (Safeguard for Agricultural Varieties in Europe)
- Irish Seed Savers Association
- ProSpecieRara
- Arca-Net
