= Gregorios Bernardakis =

Greek philologist, palaeographer and university professor

Gregorios N. Bernardakis
- Γρηγόριος Ν. Βερναρδάκης
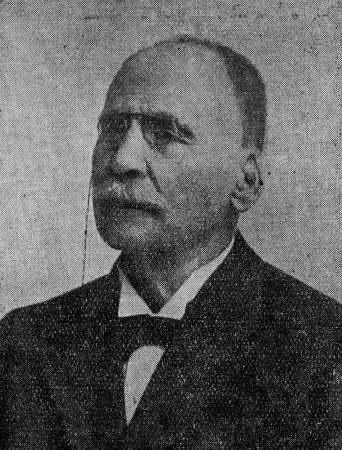
- Born: 1848; Mytilene
- Died: 1925 (aged 76–77)
- Education: National and Kapodistrian University of Athens, University of Leipzig, University of Berlin
- Occupations: Professor, writer
- Children: Demetrios Bernardakis (son)
- Relatives: Demetrios Bernardakis (brother), Athanasios Bernardakis (brother), Panayiotis Bernardakis (grandson)
- Writing career
- Pen name: Gregorius N. Bernadakis
- Language: Greek, German, Latin
- Period: Belle Époque, Megali Idea
- Genre: Textual scholarship
- Subjects: Plutarch, Strabo, Thucydides
- Notable works: Plutarchi Chaeronensis moralia (vol. I-VII), Hermeneutic Lexicon of Acclaimed Greek Poets and Writers
- Movements: Hellenism, Neo-Latin

Gregorios N. Bernardakis (Greek: Γρηγόριος Ν. Βερναρδάκης, translit. Grigorios N. Vernardakis, Neo-Latin Gregorius N. Bernardakis, b. in Mytilene, Ottoman Empire c. 1848, d. 1925) was a Greek philologist, palaeographer, and university professor. His brother was the dramatist Demetrios Bernardakis.

== Biographical sketch ==
Bernardakis was born in Mytilene, on the island of Lesbos, when it was still a part of the Ottoman Empire. He studied at the National and Kapodistrian University of Athens and earned his PhD at the age of twenty-three. While still a student there, he published his first book, Σχόλια εις τας δημηγορίας του Θουκυδίδου συνταχθέντα κατά τας αρίστας εκδόσεις ("Scholia on the Speeches of Thucydides according to the best editions", 1867). After graduation, he began his teaching career in Egypt, where he was first posted to the Abetios School in Cairo and afterwards at the Hellenic Gymnasium of Alexandria. Later he completed his philological studies at the University of Leipzig and the University of Berlin, which gave him a chance to engage in palaeography in France and in Italy. Afterwards, he returned to Greece, winding up as principal of the Gymnasium of Mytilene (1880–94) and continuing afterwards to an appointment at the Zariphios School of Philippopolis (1895–98). In 1898, he became a regular professor of Greek literature at the National and Capodistrian University of Athens, where he taught continuously until 1923.

== Scholarly works ==
The principal work for which Bernardakis was known in his philological career was a seven-volume edition (1888–96 Bibliotheca Teubneriana editio minor) of Plutarch's Moralia (Ethics), based on a previously-unknown codex (Codex Athous Gr. 268) which he had found in a monastic library on Mount Athos. He never completed the major edition, a task which was left to his son, Demetrios Bernardakis, and grandson, Panagiotis Bernardakis, who finally finished the family project in cooperation with Heinz Gerd Ingenkamp.

Later editors of the minor edition, Ulrich von Wilamowitz-Moellendorff, Max Pohlenz and Konrat Ziegler disagreed with Bernardakis and the latest (1959) minor edition does not reflect his editorial choices and the full range of manuscripts that he citied. Bernardakis's minor edition contains essays known by the Latin translations of their titles: De liberis educandis, Consolatio ad Apollonium, and Septem sapientium convivium, that are regarded as spurious by most scholars because of stylistic differences from other preserved works of Plutarch, although not all scholars regard the issue as definitively settled. One reviewer of the editions found some minor disagreements with various editorial choices, but found the typeface employed in the major edition a refreshing change from the fonts commonly used in other classical texts, and that overall, the major edition supersedes the previous edition of Vasilis Mandilaras, especially in its treatment of lectiones difficiliores, and koinisms, while still reflecting the moderate Atticism of Plutarch.

Another important work that he authored is the three-volume reference Λεξικόν ερμηνευτικόν των ενδοξότατων Ελλήνων ποιητών και συγγραφέων (Hermeneutic Lexicon of Acclaimed Greek Poets and Writers, 1908–11), with an abridgement published in 1918. The work is still in print in Greece. Likewise, another popular work of his is Σχόλια εις τας δημηγορίας του Θουκυδίδου (Scholia on the Speeches of Thucydides; 1868); he is also known for Symbolae criticae in Strabonem vel censura Cobeti emendationum in Strabonem (Critical Contributions in Strabo, or a Censure of the Emendations of Cobet on Strabo; in Latin, 1877), and other works.

=== List of publications ===
- Bernardakis, G. N. (1867). Σχόλια εις τας δημηγορίας του Θουκυδίδου συνταχθέντα κατά τας αρίστας εκδόσεις. Αθήνα: Τεκ. Ανδ. Κορομηλάς.
- Bernardakis, G. N. (1877). Symbolae criticae in Strabonem vel censura Cobeti emendationum in Strabonem. Lipsiae: B. G. Teubner.
- Bernardakis, G. N. (1879). Symbolae criticae et palaeographicae in Plutarchi vitas parallelas et moralia. Lipsiae: B. G. Teubner.
- Plutarch's Teubner edition:
  - Bernardakis, G. N., ed. (1888). Plutarchi Chaeronensis moralia. Vol. I. Lipsiae: B. G. Teubner.
  - Bernardakis, G. N., ed. (1889). Plutarchi Chaeronensis moralia. Vol. II. Lipsiae: B. G. Teubner.
  - Bernardakis, G. N., ed. (1891). Plutarchi Chaeronensis moralia. Vol. III. Lipsiae: B. G. Teubner.
  - Bernardakis, G. N., ed. (1892). Plutarchi Chaeronensis moralia. Vol. IV. Lipsiae: B. G. Teubner.
  - Bernardakis, G. N., ed. (1893). Plutarchi Chaeronensis moralia. Vol. V. Lipsiae: B. G. Teubner.
  - Bernardakis, G. N., ed. (1895). Plutarchi Chaeronensis moralia. Vol. VI. Lipsiae: B. G. Teubner.
  - Bernardakis, G. N., ed. (1896). Plutarchi Chaeronensis moralia. Vol. VII. Lipsiae: B. G. Teubner.
- Bernardakis, G. N. (1908). Λεξικὸν ἑρμηνευτικὸν τῶν ἐνδοξότατων Ἐλλήνων ποιητῶν και συγγραφέων. Ἀθήναι: Αδελφών Περρή.
- Bernardakis, G. N. (1912). Ἀπάντησις πρὸς ὄσα ἐργαφίσαν ἐν τὴν Ἀθήνα, κατά τοῦ ἑργμηνεύτικου λέξικου. Ἀθήναι: Π. Δ. Σακελλάριος.
- Bernardakis, G. N. (1918). Λεξικὸν ἐρμηνευτικόν τῶν ἐνδοξότατων Ἐλλήνων ποιητῶν και συγγραφέων (2nd ed.). Ἀθήναι: Π. Α. Πετράκου.
- Bernardakis II - Plutarch's editio maior [posthumous]:
  - Plutarch (2008). Bernardakis, G. N.; Bernardakis, P. D.; Ingenkamp, H. G. (eds.). Moralia. Vol. I. Athens: Academia Atheniensis. ISBN 978-3-487-14901-1.
  - Plutarch (2009). Bernardakis, G. N.; Bernardakis, P. D.; Ingenkamp, H. G. (eds.). Moralia. Vol. II. Athens: Academia Atheniensis. ISBN 978-3-487-14902-8.
  - Plutarch (2010). Bernardakis, G. N.; Bernardakis, P. D.; Ingenkamp, H. G. (eds.). Moralia. Vol. III. Athens: Academia Atheniensis. ISBN 978-3-487-14903-5.
  - Plutarch (2011). Bernardakis, G. N.; Bernardakis, P. D.; Ingenkamp, H. G. (eds.). Moralia. Vol. IV. Athens: Academia Atheniensis. ISBN 978-3-487-14904-2.
  - Plutarch (2013). Bernardakis, G. N.; Bernardakis, P. D.; Ingenkamp, H. G. (eds.). Moralia. Vol. V. Athens: Academia Atheniensis. ISBN 978-9-604-04279-1.
  - Plutarch (2017). Bernardakis, G. N.; Bernardakis, P. D.; Ingenkamp, H. G. (eds.). Moralia. Vol. VI. Athens: Academia Atheniensis. ISBN 978-9-604-04318-7.
