= Irish Seed Savers Association =

Non-governmental seed conservation and sharing organisation

- Company type: Foundation
- Founded: 1991
- Headquarters: Scarriff
- Area served: Ireland
- Website: www.irishseedsavers.ie

Irish Seed Savers Association (ISSA) is an Irish non-governmental organisation founded in 1991 and based in Scarriff, County Clare, Ireland. ISSA operates a living seed bank and heritage orchard, preserving over 800 varieties of heritage, open-pollinated vegetables, and more than 140 types of Irish apple tree. The organization also conducts outreach, education, and community-based conservation programmes to promote agricultural biodiversity and food security.

== Aims and Tasks ==
The Irish Seed Savers Association aims to:

- Protect, conserve and utilise Irish plant genetic resources including rare heritage seeds, grains, vegetables and fruit
- Promote agricultural biodiversity for food security
- Educate the public on agricultural biodiversity and food security through information and workshops
- Research seed, grain, vegetable and fruit varieties suited to Ireland's temperate maritime climate

With its projects, the Irish Seed Savers Association found and saved over 140 different types of Irish apple tree and 25 native Irish grains. The Irish Seed Savers Association has a ten-acre site with purpose-built facilities, native woodland and an apple orchard / nursery.

== Affiliations ==
Irish Seed Savers Association is a network partner of the European SAVE Foundation. Irish Seed Savers are also a member of the Irish Environmental Network.

== See also ==
- SAVE Foundation (Safeguard for Agricultural Varieties in Europe)
- Semperviva
- ProSpecieRara
- Arca-Net
