= Vlasios Skordelis =

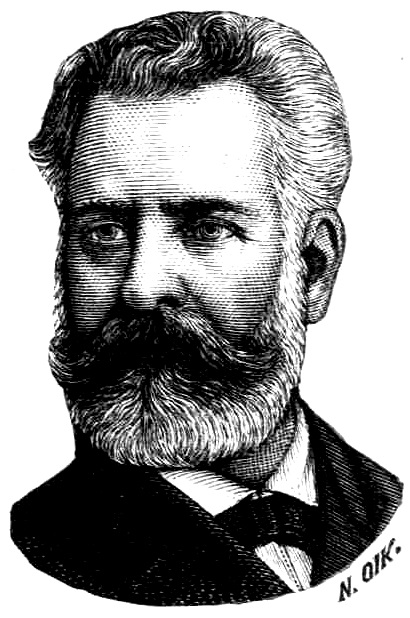
- Vlasios Skordelis in 1889
- Born: c. 1835; Stanimaka, Ottoman Empire
- Died: 15 October 1898; Athens
- Education: NKUA; Leipzig University
- Occupations: writer, educator

Vlasios Skordelis (Greek: Βλάσιος Σκορδέλης; romanized: Vlásios Skordélis) was a Greek writer and educator of the 19th century.

== Biography ==
He was born in 1835 in Stanimaka, then Ottoman Empire (now Asenovgrad, Bulgaria). From an early age he showed a strong inclination towards letters and went to Athens to complete his high school studies. He subsequently studied Pedagogy at the National and Kapodistrian University of Athens, graduating as a teacher in 1857. A year later, he went to Leipzig, Germany, to pursue postgraduate studies, and then returned to Stenimaka where he became schoolmaster of the Greek school. He later settled in Filibe (now Plovdiv), taking over the Greek School and theorically controlling all the Greek schools of the province.

Skordelis assumed this position at a critical historical period. His education initiatives appear to have sought to cultivate national self-awareness and stimulate national unity in Bulgaria, in response to the challenges of Bulgarians through the provision of high quality education. One of his projects for this purpose was to enhance and enrich the Central School Library.

In 1868, following episodes between the Ottoman Empire and the Ecumenical Patriarchate over issues that satisfied the claims of the Bulgarians, the Greek community of Philippopolis (officially Filibe) decided to send Skordelis as its representative to Konstantiniyye. He remained there at least until August 1869, participating in negotiations to resolve the Bulgarian ecclesiastical issue, informing the Greek community and giving it international prominence. For this reason he worked with the several newspapers and also published his own publications and magazines.

After the negotiations were completed, Skordelis returned to Philippopolis and continued to deal with the educational issues of the province. In 1872 he founded the Philomousos Society, while he was already declared an honorary member of the Philological Association of Constantinople. At the suggestion of Georgios Zariphis, who had founded the Zariphios School in Philippopolis, Skordelis again went to Leipzig to pursue further pedagogical studies. He returned in 1875 and assumed the position of head teacher during the period 1877–1878.

In 1880 he moved to the free Greek state, initially to Tripoli, where he headed the local school, and then to Athens, where he founded a Girls' School, of which he was the head teacher until October 15, 1898, when he died.

== Works ==
- Θρακικαί Μελέται. (Thracian study)
- Διδασκαλικός οδηγός: ήτοι θεωρητικός και πρακτικός οδηγός των Δημοτικών Σχολείων και Παρθεναγωγείων. (Teacher guide: theoritical and practical guide of Primary schools and Girl schools)
- Ημερολόγιον δημοδιδασκάλου: ήτοι η παιδαγωγία εν τη πράξει. (Diary of a teacher: Pedagogy in practise)
- Περί Θράκης: Λόγος εκφωνηθείς κατά την επέτειον εορτήν της εν Φιλιππουπόλει κεντρικής Ελλ. Σχολής λ' Ιανουαρίου αωξε΄. (Thrace: Speech during anniversary in the Greek school of Philippopolis in January)
- Το χωρίον της Ροδόπης. (The village of Rhodope)
- Ἑλληνικόν λεξιλόγιον. (Greek vocabulary)

== Sources ==
- Πάντος, Δημήτριος (2009). "Ο Βλάσιος Σκορδέλης (1835-1900) και το Βουλγαρικό Εκκλησιαστικό ζήτημα" [Vlasios Skordelis (1835-1900) and the Bulgarian Ecclesiastical issue] (PDF). Θεολογία: 234–276.
