= Demetrios Bernardakis =

- Δημήτριος Βερναρδάκης
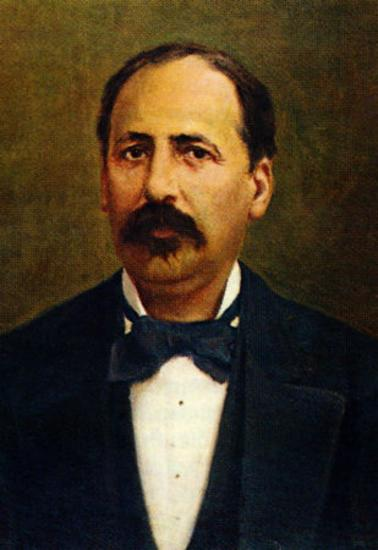
- Born: 3 December 1833; Agia Marinia, Mytilene
- Died: 25 January 1907 (aged 73)
- Education: National and Kapodistrian University of Athens
- Occupations: Professor, writer
- Relatives: Gregorios Bernardakis (brother), Athanasios Bernardakis (brother), Panayiotis Bernardakis (great-nephew)
- Writing career
- Language: Greek
- Period: Belle Époque, Megali Idea
- Genres: Textual scholarship, drama, catechesis
- Subject: Euripides
- Notable awards: Nobel Prize (nominated)
- Movements: Hellenism, Katharevousa

Signature
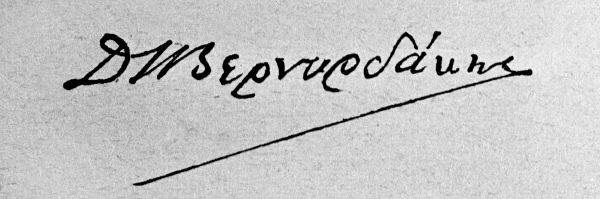

Demetrios Bernardakis (Greek: Δημήτριος Βερναρδάκης, Dimitrios Vernardakis, also transliterated Dimitrios Bernardakis; 3 December 1833 – 25 January 1907) was a polymath writer and Professor of History at the National and Kapodistrian University of Athens.

== Biographical sketch ==
He was born at Agia Marina, Lesbos (just south of Mytilene). His father was Nikolaos Vernardakis, originally from Crete, while his mother was Melissini, of the Trantalis family. His brothers were the learned Athanasios Bernardakis and Gregorios Bernardakis.

He studied on a scholarship given to him by Patriarch Alexandros Kallinikos from present-day Skotina, Pieria. A prolific writer, he translated and annotated the tragedies of Euripides (The Phoenician Women, Hecuba, Hippolytus, and Medea), but he became known chiefly for the sake of his own verse dramas, with which he wanted to create a romantic Greek theatre, taking as his example Shakespeare, Greek mythology, and Greek history. His works had success in his own era, but were quickly forgotten, chiefly by reason of their archaizing language.

His university career ended on 27 August 1869 when Bernardakis was compelled to resign by reason of continuing student reactions (the so-called Vernardakeia), which he attributed to collusion with his university rivals and their political power at the time.

His brother, Athansios Bernardakis, nominated Demetrios twice (in 1904 and 1905) for the Nobel Prize in Literature.

== Selected works ==
=== Theatrical ===
- Μαρία Δοξαπατρή (Maria Doxapatri 1857)
- Κυψελίδαι (The Beehive, 1858)
- Μερόπη (Merope, 1865)
- Ευφροσύνη (Euphrosyne, 1876)
- Φαύστα (Fausta, 1893)
- Αντιόπη (Antiope, 1895)
- Νικηφόρος Φωκάς (Nicephorus Phocas, 1905)

=== Linguistic ===
- Ελληνική Γραμματική εις χρήσιν των Ελληνικών σχολείων (Greek Grammar for use in Greek schools, 1864–1865)
- Ψευδαττικισμού έλεγχος (The control of illusion, 1884)

=== Historical ===
- Γενική Ιστορία (General History, 1867)

=== Theological ===
- Ιερά Κατήχησις (Sacred Catechisis, endorsed in 1872 by the Ecumenical Patriarchate of Constantinople as the best available biblical catechesis recommended for schooldchildren)
