= Carsten Høeg =

Carsten Høeg (15 November 1896 in Aalborg – 3 April 1961) was a Danish professor of classical philology and a Juris Doctor at the University of Copenhagen from 1926. He earned his Ph.D. with an ethnographic study of the Sarakatsani Greeks. He later published studies on classical Greek and Latin literature and on Byzantine music. From 1935 he was the founding director of the edition series Monumenta Musicae Byzantinae. During the German occupation of Denmark from 1940–1945, he was the leader of a resistance group within the Danish Freedom Council, whose task was assembling the list of Danish Nazis and Nazi collaborators to be prosecuted after the liberation.

Høeg was awarded honorary doctorates by the universities of Athens (1937), Aberdeen (1948) and Thessaloniki (1950).

== Selected publications ==
- 1925 – Les Saracatsans I.
- 1942 – Introduktion til Cicero.
- 1953 – The oldest Slavonic tradition of Byzantine music.
