= Lefteris Zagoritis =

Greek lawyer and politician

Lefteris Zagoritis (Greek: Λευτέρης Ζαγορίτης; born 14 September 1956) is a Greek lawyer, politician and former Secretary General of New Democracy. As of 19 September 2015 he is serving as Hellenic Consumers' Ombudsman.

Zagoritis, whose family comes from Zagorohoria of Epirus, was born on the island of Rhodes and is of Sarakatsani origin.

Zagoritis was first elected to the Greek Parliament on the statewide ticket in 2004 for the Athens B constituency, and was re-elected in 2007. He served as Secretary General of the New Democracy party from 2006 to 2010.

Zagoritis is a graduate of the Law School of the University of Athens as well as of the Department of Political Science.

For many years he served as elected member and Vice-President of the Athens Bar Association, where he also chaired the Disciplinary Board.
