= Georgios Zariphis =

Ottoman banker and financier

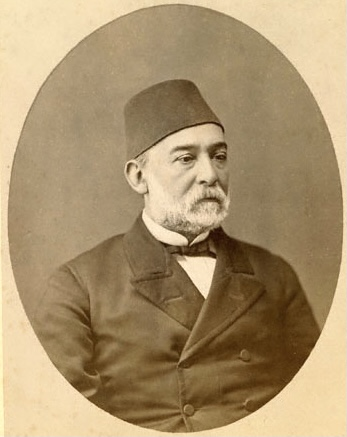
- c. 1881
- Born: Yorgo Zariphis; 1810; Constantinople, Ottoman Empire
- Died: 28 March 1884 (aged 73–74); Switzerland
- Occupations: Banker and financier
- Known for: Benefaction

Georgios Y. Zariphis (Greek: Γεώργιος Ζαρίφης, Turkish: Yorgo Zarifi; 1810 – 28 March 1884), also known as Yorgo Zarifi, was an Ottoman Greek banker and financier. He was also well known as a prominent benefactor of his time. Zariphis met Sultan Abdul Hamid II when the latter was a shahzade with a low expectation of ascending to the throne. The prince, having financial troubles, called on the expertise of Zariphis to manage his personal wealth. After Abdul Hamid II became sultan, he continued to utilize Zarifi's advisory services during the First Constitutional Era.

Living at the time when the Ottoman Empire was in great financial distress and had declared bankruptcy, Zariphis was one of the Galata bankers who was involved in the Empire's debt raising. He was involved in setting up the Düyun-u Umumiye (Office of Public Debt) in 1881 that oversaw tax collection and debt payments of the Ottoman Empire.

Zariphis also sponsored the foundation of Greek language schools, which were named Zariphia after schools: like the Zariphios School in Philippopolis (present-day: Plovdiv, Ottoman era: Filibe) and Dede Aghach (present-day: Alexandroupoli). It is understood from the dedication of the book that he provided financial support to Vasileios I. Kandes, who wrote a book about the history of Bursa.

== Traces of Zariphis in today's Istanbul ==
One of the buildings of the Balıklı Greek Hospital is named Zariphion in his honor, not because of a specific bequest but in remembrance of the many at-large donations he gave during his lifetime.

Georgios Zariphis's summertime mansion, Zarifi Köşkü, in the Yeniköy district, is a listed and protected historical building, which in 2005 started undergoing renovation as the headquarters of the Turkish Football Federation.

A restaurant in the Beyoğlu district is named Zariphis (Zarifi), both as a play on the word zarif ("genteel") and with reference to Yorgo Zarifi.

In September 1955, during the anti-Greek Istanbul riots his grave was vandalized by a fanatical mob.
