= Kostas Varnalis =

Greek poet (1884–1974)

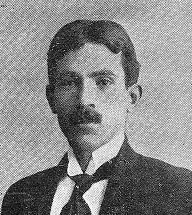
- Kostas Varnalis in his late years
- Born: 14 February 1884; Burgas, Eastern Rumelia, Ottoman Empire
- Died: 16 December 1974 (aged 90); Athens, Greece
- Education: University of Athens
- Occupations: Poet, journalist
- Writing career
- Notable awards: Lenin Peace Prize; 1959

Kostas Varnalis (Greek: Κώστας Βάρναλης; 14 February 1884 – 16 December 1974) was a Greek poet and writer.

== Life ==
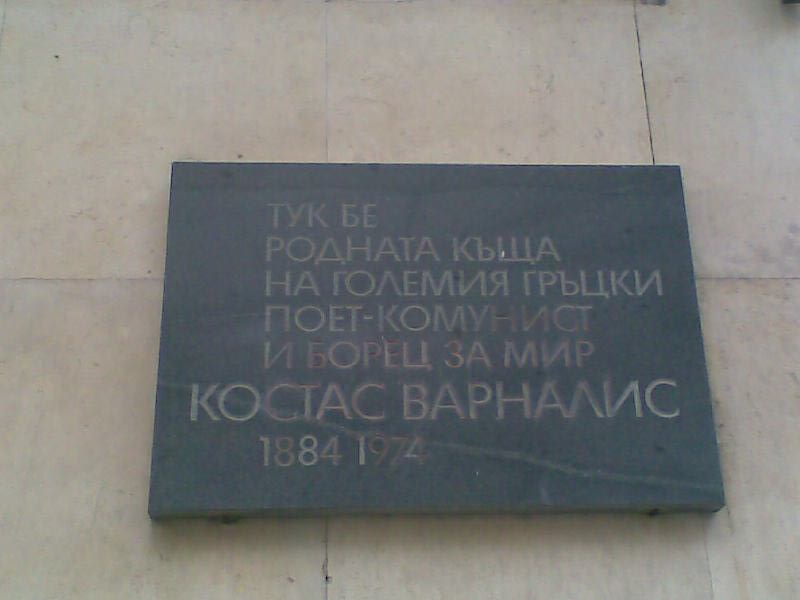
Commemorative plaque of Kostas Varnalis in his native city Burgas, Bulgaria

Varnalis was born in Burgas, Eastern Rumelia (now in Bulgaria), in 1884. As his name suggests, his family originated from Varna; his father's family name was Boubous. He completed his elementary studies in the Zariphios Greek high school in Plovdiv and then moved to Athens in 1902 to study literature at the National and Kapodistrian University of Athens. While there, he became involved in the Greek language dispute, taking the side of the demoticists over the supporters of the katharevousa. After his graduation in 1908 he worked for some time as a teacher in Burgas, before returning to Greece and teaching in Amaliada and Athens. During the next years, he worked as a teacher and part-time journalist, also engaging in translation work. In 1913, he took part in the Second Balkan War.

In 1919 he gained a scholarship and travelled to Paris where he studied philosophy, literature and sociology. It was during his Parisian studies that he became a Marxist and reviewed his ideas on poetry in theory and in practice. His communist political alignment and association with the Communist Party of Greece resulted in his being dismissed from his teaching position at the Pedagogical Academy in 1926 and barred from any state employment. Varnalis thus took to journalism, a profession he practiced until the end of his life. In 1929, he married the poet Dora Moatsou. In 1935, he participated in the Soviet Writers' Conference in Moscow as Greece's representative. Under the 4th of August Regime, he was sent to internal exile in Mytilene and Agios Efstratios. During the German Occupation of Greece, he took part in the resistance movement as a member of the National Liberation Front (EAM). In 1959, he was awarded the Lenin Peace Prize. Varnalis died in Athens on 16 December 1974, and is buried in the First Cemetery of Athens.

== Writings ==
Varnalis published his first poetic work at the Greek-language Plovdiv newspaper News of Aimos, under the pen name Figeus (Φηγεύς). His first appearance in Greece was in the magazine Noumas (Νουμάς) under his real name.

=== Poetry ===
- Kirithres (Κηρήθρες, "Honeycombs"), Varnalis' first collection, Athens 1905.
- O Proskynitis (Ο Προσκυνητής, "The Pilgrim"), 1919.
- To fos pou kaiei (Το φως που καίει, "The Burning Light"), Alexandria 1922, under the pen-name Dimos Tanalias.
- Sklavoi poliorkimenoi (Σκλάβοι πολιορκημένοι, "Besieged Slaves"), 1927.
- Poiitika (Ποιητικά, "Poetic Works"), collection, 1956.
- Eleftheros Kosmos (Ελεύθερος Κόσμος, "Free World"), collection, 1965.
- Orgi laou (Οργή λαού, "Wrath of People"), collection, published posthumously in 1975.

=== Prose and literary criticism ===
- O laos ton mounouchon (Ο λαός των μουνούχων, "The eunuch people"), 1923, under the pen-name Dimos Tanalias.
- O Solomos horis metafysiki (Ο Σολωμός χωρίς μεταφυσική, "Solomos without Μetaphysics"), 1925.
- H alithini apologia tou Sokrati (Η αληθινή απολογία του Σωκράτη, "The True Apology of Socrates", 1931.
- Alithinoi anthropoi (Αληθινοί άνθρωποι, "Real People"), 1938.
- To imerologio tis Pinelopis (Το ημερολόγιο της Πηνελόπης, "The Diary of Penelope"), 1947.
- Oi diktatores (Οι δικτάτορες, "The Dictators"), 1956.
- Pezos logos (Πεζός λόγος, "Prose"), 1957.
- Solomika (Σολωμικά, "On Solomos"), 1957.
- Aisthitika Kritika A kai B (Αισθητικά Κριτικά Α και Β, "Aesthetic Critical Works A and B"), 1958.
- Anthropoi. Zontanoi - Alithinoi (Άνθρωποι. Ζωντανοί - Αληθινοί, "Humans. Alive - Real"), 1958.
- Filologika Apomnimonevmata (Φιλολογικά Απομνημονεύματα, "Philological Memoirs"), 1980.

=== Theatrical ===
- Attalos o Tritos (Άτταλος ο Τρίτος, "Attalos the Third"), 1972.
