= Georgios Kleovoulos =

Greek scholar and educator (1785–1828)

Georgios Kleovoulos (Greek: Γεώργιος Κλεόβουλος, Philippopolis, c. 1785 - Syros, July 28, 1828) was a Greek scholar and educator of the early 19th century. He was born in Philippopolis (present-day Plovdiv), in the Ottoman Empire. He was a supporter of the mutual-teaching schools and one of the people who brought this teaching method to Greece. He taught in Iași, Odessa, Syros and Poros and died on the 28 July 1828 in Syros of pneumonia.

== Biography ==
Kleovoulos was born around 1785, the son of a poor craftsman. At an early age he was adopted by the deacon of the Metropolitan of Philippopolis, Makarios of Patmos, who helped Kleovoulos to study at Patmiada School and then at the Academy of Kydonies (Ayvalık). There he studied alongside renowned scholars of the time such as Benjamin of Lesbos and Grigorios of Kydonies.

He completed his studies with a distinguished performance and then lived for three years in Vienna where, alongside his studies, he was teaching the Greek language. He also studied in Bavaria and later he visited Switzerland where he became familiar with the mutual-teaching method practiced by Johann Heinrich Pestalozzi and Philipp Emanuel von Fellenberg. Thrilled by this method of teaching, he went to France in order to learn how to use it and after his studies he became principal of a Greek school in Iasi in the Danubian Principalities (1819-1821). From that school almost 100 students graduated and then moved to Greece where they practiced the same method. Until 1824, Kleovoulos used the mutual-teaching method at a school of the Greek community in Odessa as well.

In 1825 Kleovoulos went to the Cyclades in Greece, where the Greek War of Independence had broken out in 1821. There, after fruitless efforts to create mutual-teaching schools in Paros, Naxos and Tinos, he settled in Syros where he taught the mutual-teaching method to the children of Greek refugees who had found shelter on the island4. In April 1828, after an invitation of the Governor of Greece, Ioannis Kapodistrias, he was appointed principal at the exemplary School of Poros. However, shortly after that, he caught pneumonia. He went to Syros to take his family and return to Poros, but in the meantime his health deteriorated and he died on 28 July.

== Work ==
In 1820, Kleovoulos wrote an article which was published in Hermes o Logios that was one of the first systematic studies about the mutual-teaching method written in Greek language. Furthermore, he left handwritten notes on the interpretation and application of the method, which was used by a large number of Greek teachers even after 1830, when the Greek translation of Louis Charles Sarazin's handbook was approved by the Preparatory School Commission".

== Bibliography ==
- Περσελή, Εμμανουήλ Π. (2004). Εξουσία και Θρησκευτική Αγωγή στην Ελλάδα του 19ου αιώνα. Αθήνα: Εκδόσεις «Γρηγόρη».
