= Zariphios School =

- Ζαρίφειος Σχολή
- Plovdiv; Bulgaria

Information
- Type: elementary and secondary male & female school, pedagogical academy
- Established: 1875
- Founder: Georgios Zariphis
- Closed: 1906
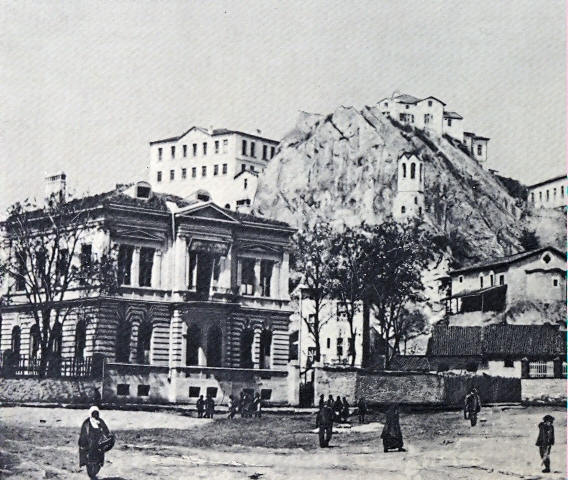
- The building of the Zariphios men's high school

The Zariphios School (Greek: Ζαρίφειος Σχολή Φιλιππουπόλεως, "Zariphios School of Philippopolis") was a Greek educational institution established in 1875 in Plovdiv (Philippopolis), then in the Ottoman Empire and now in Bulgaria. It became one of the most significant Greek educational centres in the region of Thrace, attracting teachers from Greece and Western Europe and existed until 1906. The Zariphios was one of the first schools of the Greek diaspora that introduced primary and secondary education for girls.

== Background ==
Until the early 20th century, the Greek community was one of the three most numerous ethnic communities in Plovdiv, behind Bulgarians and Turks. Greek education was thriving during the 19th century and reached a peak in the 1880s. At that time the city hosted eight Greek language schools: one boys' school, three mutual education schools, one central, one district girls' schools and two pedagogical academies. There were also two private parish schools with clerics as teachers.

== History ==
Zariphios was established in 1875 owing to an initiative of the Greek Education Committee of Thrace and the sponsorship of the banker and benefactor from Constantinople Georgios Zariphis, one of the prominent personalities in the Ottoman capital's business life at the time. Additionally, Zariphis offered an annual amount of 1,000 pounds for the school's needs.

The school soon became a well known educational institution for Greek communities inside and outside the region of Eastern Rumelia (an autonomous province under Ottoman control, established in 1878 and united in 1885 with the Principality of Bulgaria) and Thrace. To increase its authority and prestige, the Zariphios increased its contacts with prominent educational institutions in Greece and Western Europe. Moreover, it attracted university teachers in the fields of philology, mathematics and theology from the capital of the Greek state, Athens, as well as music teachers from France and Germany.

From 1881, the Zariphios and the rest of the Greek schools in the city synchronized their curriculum with the schools in Greece, while from 1885 they issued certificates identical to those of high schools in Greece. In 1906, Greek-Bulgarian antagonism over the Macedonian Question led to the departure of the majority of the Greek community. Their schools had to close, and the remaining female students of the Zariphios attended the local French college of Saint Augustine.

== Notable teachers ==
- Gregorios Bernardakis (1848-1925), philologist, palaeographer and university professor

== Notable graduates ==
- Christos Tsountas (1857–1913), archaeologist
- Patriarch Photios II of Constantinople (1874–1935)
- Kostas Varnalis (1884–1974), poet

== See also ==
- Greeks in Bulgaria
