= Sarakatsani =

Greek population group

Sarakatsani Σαρακατσάνοι
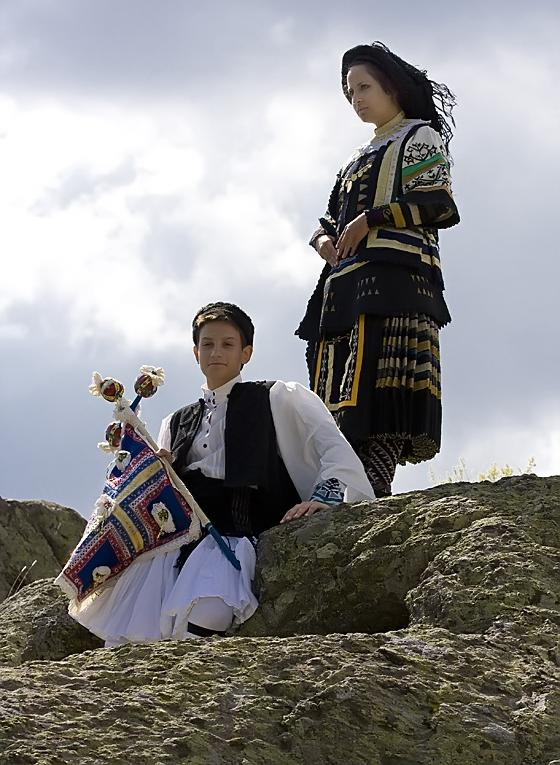
- Sarakatsani children in Kotel, Bulgaria

Total population
- Unknown

Regions with significant populations
- Greece: 80,000 (1950s est.)
- Bulgaria: 2,071 (2021) – 15,000 (1992 est.)

Languages
- Greek

Religion
- Greek Orthodoxy

Flag of the Sarakatsani

The Sarakatsani (Greek: Σαρακατσάνοι), also called Karakachani (Bulgarian: каракачани), are an ethnic Greek population subgroup who were traditionally transhumant shepherds, native to Greece, with a smaller presence in neighbouring Bulgaria, southern Albania, and North Macedonia. Historically centred on the Pindus mountains and other mountain ranges in continental Greece, most Sarakatsani have abandoned the transhumant way of life and have been urbanised.

== Name ==
The most widely accepted theory for the origin of the name "Sarakatsani" is that it comes from the Turkish word karakaçan (from kara = 'black' and kaçan = 'fugitive'), used by the Ottomans, in reference to those people who dressed in black and fled to the mountains during their rule. Scholars who propose a Vlach origin for the Sarakatsani suggest their name derives from the Romanian word sărac meaning 'poor', or related terms like sărăcăcios (in bad condition) or sarcin (weight, bundle). According to other theories, the name could stem from the village of Sakaretsi (the supposed homeland of the Sarakatsani), or from the village of Syrrako.

== History and origin ==
Despite the silence of the classical and medieval writers, scholars argue that the Sarakatsani are a Greek people, possibly descended from pre-classical indigenous pastoralists, citing linguistic evidence and certain aspects of their traditional culture and socioeconomic organisation. A popular theory, based on linguistics and material culture, suggests that the Sarakatsani are descended from the Dorians, who were isolated for centuries in the mountains.

Their origins have been the subject of broad and permanent interest, resulting in several fieldwork studies by anthropologists among the Sarakatsani.

=== Accounts ===
Many of the 19th century descriptions of the Sarakatsani do not differentiate them from the other great shepherd people of the Balkans, the Aromanians ("Vlachs") a Romance-speaking population. In many instances the Sarakatsani were identified as Vlachs. Aravantinos discusses how another group, the Arvanitovlachs (also known as Farsharot Aromanians), were erroneously called Sarakatsani, although the latter were clearly of Greek origin, increasing the differences between the two groups and stating that the Arvanitovlachs were actually yet another group, the Garagounides or Korakounides. The Sarakatsani have also been referred to as Roumeliotes or Moraites, names based on where they lived. Otto, the first king of modern Greece, was well known to be a great admirer of the Sarakatsani, and is said to have fathered an illegitimate child early in his reign with a woman from a Sarakatsani clan named Tangas.

Since the 20th century a multitude of scholars have studied the linguistic, cultural and racial background of the Sarakatsani. Among these, Danish scholar Carsten Høeg, who travelled twice to Greece between 1920 and 1925 and studied the dialect and narrations of the Sarakatsani, is arguably the most influential. He found no traces of foreign elements in the Sarakatsani dialect and no traces of sedentism in their material culture. Furthermore, he looked for examples of nomadism in classical Greece, similar to that of the Sarakatsani. He visited the Sarakatsani of Epirus and mentioned other groups with no fixed villages in several other parts of Greece as well.

There appears to be no written mention of the Sarakatsani previous to the 18th century, but that does not necessarily imply that they did not exist earlier. It is likely the term 'Sarakatsani' is a relatively new generic name given to an old population that lived for centuries in isolation from the other inhabitants of what is today Greece.

Georgakas (1949) and Kavadias (1965) believe that the Sarakatsani are either descendants of ancient nomads who inhabited the mountain regions of Greece in the pre-classical times, or they are descended from sedentary Greek peasants forced to leave their original settlements around the 14th century who became nomadic shepherds. Angeliki Hatzimihali, a Greek folklorist who spent a lifetime among the Sarakatsani, emphasises the prototypical elements of Greek culture that she found in the pastoral way of life, social organisation and art forms of the Sarakatsani. She also points out the similarity between their decorative art and the geometric art of pre-classical Greece. Euripides Makris (1997) describes the Sarakatsani as "the most ancient Greek tribe of nomadic shepherds, whose origins can be traced to time immemorial".

English historian and anthropologist John K. Campbell arrives at the conclusion that the Sarakatsani must have always lived in—more or less—the same conditions and areas as they were found in his days of research in the mid-1950s. He also highlights the differences between them and the Aromanians, regarding the Sarakatsani as a distinctive social group within the Greek nation. As a result of his field studies of the Sarakatsani of Epirus, Nicholas Hammond, a British historian, considers them descendants of Greek pastoralists living in the region of Gramos and Pindus since the early Byzantine period, who were dispossessed of their pastures by the Aromanians at the latest by the 12th century.

According to Kapka Kassabova, who lived among the Sarakatsani in Bulgaria, in modern times, four major factors account for the disintegration of the people's traditional nomadic lifestyle: (a) after WWI, in agreements such as the Treaty of Neuilly-sur-Seine, new borders were drawn up between Greece, Bulgaria and Turkey, which made nomadic caravans engaged in transhumance both costly and dangerous; (b) in the wake of WWII and the outbreak of the Cold War, these national borders froze relations and outlawed the movement of animals and people from the Aegean and Thracian Balkan lowlands into the interior; (c) the process of collectivization in Bulgaria undertaken from 1957 onwards led to the slaughter of much livestock, together with outright theft of flocks; and (d) with the collapse of communism and the onset of privatization, both the mass slaughter of livestock and their export led to a drastic loss of animals, with no residual state infrastructure left to protect them. It was only a group of animal lovers who mustered the remaining stocks and established an area to conserve them in Orelyak, which enabled the Karakachan breeds of horse, sheep and dog to survive intact.

=== Sarakatsani and Aromanians ===
Romanian and Aromanian scholars have tried to prove a common origin for the Sarakatsani and the Aromanians. The latter, also known as Vlachs, constitute the other major transhumant ethnic group in Greece and speak Aromanian, an eastern Romance language, while the Sarakatsani speak a northern dialect of Greek.

The Sarakatsani partially share a common geographic distribution with the Aromanians in Greece, although the Sarakatsani extend farther to the south. Despite the differences between the two populations, they are often confused with each other due to their common transhumant way of life. Moreover, the term "Vlach" has been used in Greece since the Byzantine times to refer indiscriminately to all transhumant pastoralists. Besides, the presumption that a nomadic society, such as the Sarakatsani, would abandon its language, then translate all of its verbal tradition into Greek and create within a few generations a separate Greek dialect, has to be rejected.

John Campbell stated, after his own field work among the Sarakatsani in the 1950s, that the Sarakatsani were in a different position from the Aromanians. The Aromanians are usually bilingual in Greek and Aromanian, while the Sarakatsani communities have always spoken only Greek and have known no other language. He also asserts that the increasing pressure on the limited areas available for winter grazing in the coastal plains has resulted in disputes between the two groups on the use of the pastures. In addition, during the time of his research, many Aromanians often lived in substantial villages where shepherding was not among their occupations, and demonstrated different art forms, values and institutions, from those of the Sarakatsani. The Sarakatsani also differ from the Aromanians in that they dower their daughters, assign a lower position to women and adhere to an even stricter patriarchal structure.

== Culture ==
Today, almost all Sarakatsani have abandoned their nomadic way of life and assimilated to mainstream modern Greek life, but there have been efforts to preserve their cultural heritage. The traditional Sarakatsani settlements, dress and costumes make them a distinct social and cultural group within the collective Greek heritage, and they are not considered among the Greeks to constitute an ethnic minority. Their distinctive folk arts consist of song, dance, and poetry, as well as decorative sculptures in wood and embroidery on their traditional costumes, which resemble the geometric art of pre-classical Greece. In medicine, they use a number of folk remedies including herbs, honey and lamb's blood.

=== Language ===
The Sarakatsani speak a northern Greek dialect, Sarakatsanika (Σαρακατσάνικα), which contains many archaic Greek elements that have not survived in other variants of modern Greek. Carsten Høeg states that there are no significant traces of foreign loan words in the Sarakatsani dialect and that foreign elements are not found in the phonological or the grammatical structures. Sarakatsanika has a few words related to pastoralism of Aromanian origin, but the Aromanian influences on the Sarakatsani dialect are the result of recent contacts and economical dependencies between the two groups.

In Bulgaria, the Sarakatsani use both Bulgarian and Greek to the same extent in their families and communities. They have a complex or different identities, as Sarakatsani, but also Greek, as well as Bulgarian. In Bulgaria, they usually mark their ethnicity as Bulgarian and speak Bulgarian in most situations.

=== Kinship and honor of the kindred ===
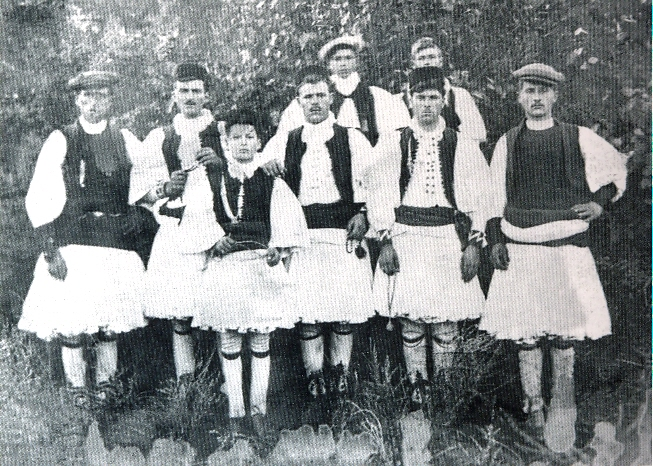
Sarakatsani men in West Macedonia, Greece, in 1935

The kinship system among the Sarakatsani adheres to a strong patrilineal descent system. When reckoning descent, lineage is traced along the paternal line alone; in determining family relationships, the descendants of a man's maternal and paternal grandparents provide the field from which his recognized kin are drawn. Kinship is not counted beyond the degree of the second cousin. Within the kinship, the family constitutes the significant unit and is a corporate group. A conjugal pair is the core of the extended family, which also includes their unmarried offspring and often their young married sons and their wives. The Sarakatsani kindred constitutes a network of shared obligations and cooperation in situations concerning the honor of its members.

Their marriages are arranged and there can be no marriage between two members of the same kindred. The bride must bring into the marriage a dowry of household furnishings, clothing and more recently sheep or their cash equivalent. The husband's contribution is his share of the flocks held by his father, which remain held in common by his paternal joint household until some years after his marriage. The newlywed couple initially takes up residence near the husband's family of origin, while divorce and remarriage after widowhood are unknown.

The concept of honor is of great importance to the Sarakatsani and the behaviour of any member of a family reflects upon all its members. Therefore, the avoidance of negative public opinion provides a strong incentive to live up to the values and standards of propriety held by the community as a whole. Men have as their duty the protection of the family's honor and are watchful of the behaviour of the rest of the members of the household.

=== Religion ===
The Sarakatsani are Greek Orthodox Christians and affiliated with the Church of Greece.

The Sarakatsani honor the feast days of Saint George and Saint Demetrius, which fall just before their seasonal migrations in late spring and early winter, respectively. Especially for the Saint George's feast day, a family feasts on lamb in the saint's honor, a ritual that also marks Christmas and the Resurrection of Christ, while Easter week is the most important ritual period in Sarakatsani religious life. Other ceremonial events, outside the formal Christian calendar, are weddings and funerals; the latter are ritual occasions that involve not only the immediate family of the deceased, but also the members of the largest kindred, while funerary practice is consistent with that of the church. Mourning is most marked among the women and most of all by the widow.

=== Pastoralism ===
The Sarakatsani traditionally have spent the summer months in the mountains and returned to the lower plains in the winter. The migration would start on the eve of Saint George's day in April and the return migration would begin on Saint Demetrius' day, on 26 October. However, according to a theory, the Sarakatsani were not always nomads, but only turned to harsh nomadic mountain life to escape Ottoman rule. The Sarakatsani were found in several mountainous regions of continental Greece, with some groups of northern Greece moving to neighbouring countries in the summer, since border crossings between Greece, Albania, Bulgaria and the former Yugoslavia were relatively unobstructed until the middle of the 20th century. After 1947, with the beginning of the Cold War, borders between these countries were sealed; and some Sarakatsani groups were trapped in other countries and not able to return to Greece.

Traditional Sarakatsani settlements were located on or near grazing lands both during summers and winters. The most characteristic type of dwelling was a domed hut, framed of branches and covered with thatch. A second type was a wood-beamed, thatched, rectangular structure. In both types, the centerpiece of the dwelling was a stone hearth. The floors and walls were plastered with mud and mule dung. Since the late 1930s, national requirements for the registration of citizens have led most of the Sarakatsani to adopt as legal residence the villages associated with summer grazing lands, and many have since built permanent houses in such villages.

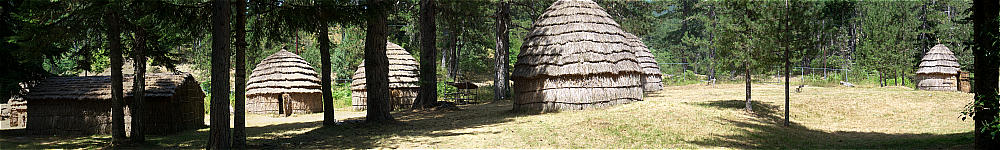
A reconstructed Sarakatsani hamlet in Skamneli village, in Epirus, Greece

Their traditional settlements consist of a group of cooperating houses, generally linked by ties of kinship or marriage. They build the houses in a cluster on flat land close to the pasturage, with supporting structures nearby. This complex is called stani (στάνη), a term also used to refer to the cooperative group sharing the leased land. The head of each participating family pays a share at the end of each season to tselingas, the stani leader, in whose name the lease was originally taken. Inheritance of an individual's property and wealth generally passes to the males of the family; sons inherit a share of the flocks and property owned by their fathers and mothers, although household goods may pass to daughters.

Their life centers year-round on the needs of their flocks; men and boys are usually responsible for the protection and general care of the flocks, like shearing and milking, while women are occupied with the building of the dwellings, sheepfolds and goat pens; child care, and other domestic tasks, including preparing, spinning and dying the shorn wool; and tending chickens, the eggs of which are their only source of personal income. Women also keep household vegetable gardens, with some wild herbs used to supplement the family diet. When boys are old enough to help with the flocks, they accompany their fathers and are taught the skills they will someday need. Similarly, girls learn through observing and assisting their mothers.

== Demographics ==
Until the mid-20th century, the Sarakatsani were scattered in many parts of Greece, with those of the northern Greek regions moving frequently for the summer months to neighbouring countries, such as Albania, southern Yugoslavia, Bulgaria and East Thrace in Turkey. In the 1940s the borders between these countries were closed, and small numbers of Sarakatsani had to settle down outside of Greece. Residual communities still exist in southern Albania (northern Epirus), North Macedonia, and Bulgaria.

It has been difficult to establish the exact number of the Sarakatsani over the years, since they were dispersed and migrated in summer and winter and were not considered a distinct group such that census data have not included separate information on them. As well, they were often confused with other population groups, especially the Aromanians. However, in the mid-1950s their number was estimated at 80,000 in Greece, but it was a period in which the process of urbanization had already started for large numbers of Greeks, and the number of the Sarakatsani who had already ceased to be transhumant shepherds sometime in the past was unknown.

The Sarakatsani populations can be primarily found in several regions of continental Greece: in the Pindus mountain range and its southern extensions of Giona, Parnassus and Panaitoliko in Central Greece; in central Euboea, in the mountains of northern Peloponnese, in the Rhodope Mountains in Greece, in Greek Thrace, in the mountains near Olympus and Ossa, and in parts of Greek Macedonia. The vast majority of the Sarakatsani have abandoned the nomadic way of life and live permanently in their villages, while many members of the younger generation have moved to the principal Greek cities.

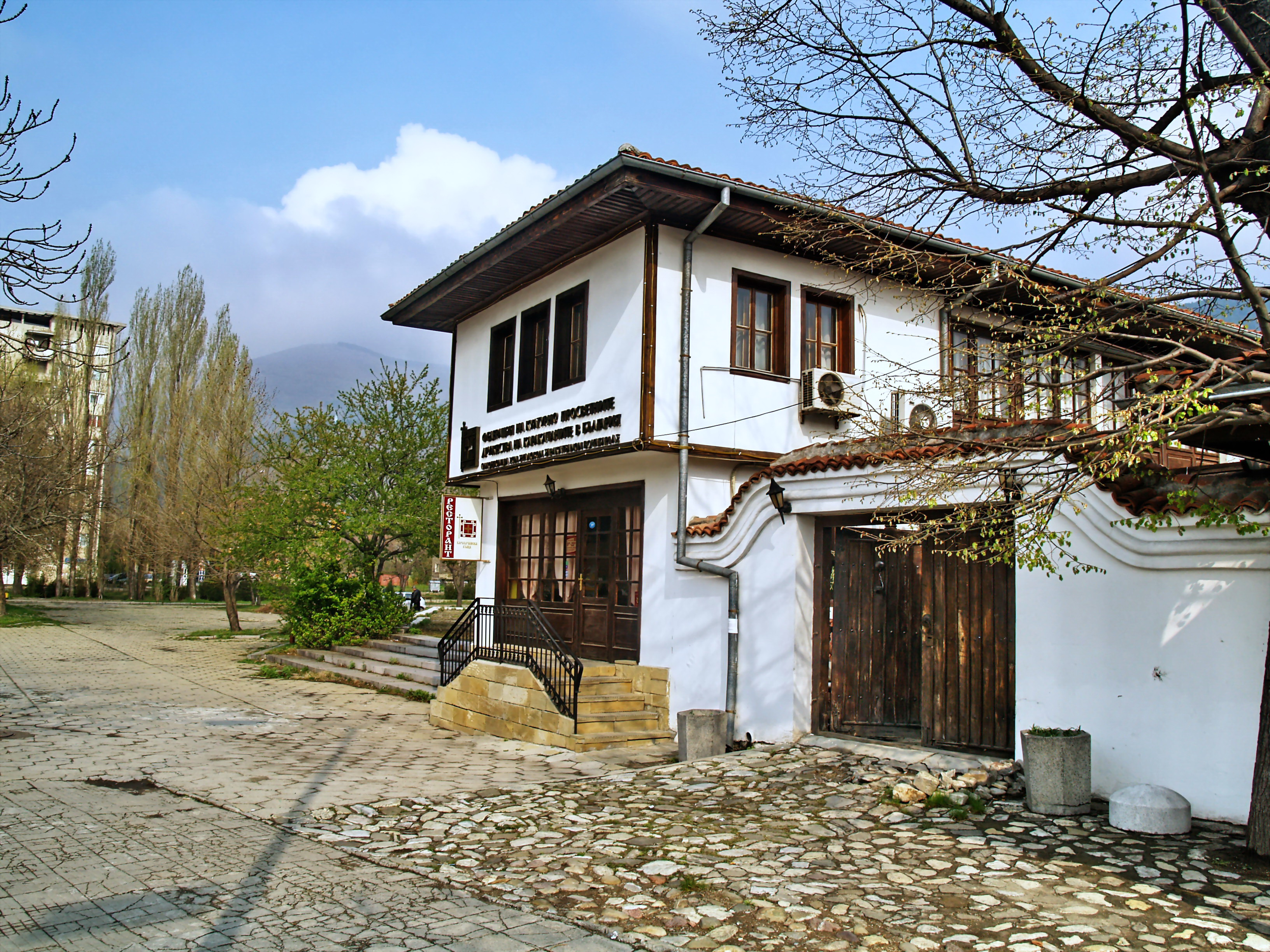
The seat of the federation of Bulgaria's Sarakatsani in Sliven

In Bulgaria, according to the 2011 census, 2,556 individuals were identified as Sarakatsani, (Bulgarian: каракачани, karakachani), a number significantly reduced from the 4,107 Sarakatsani identified in the 2001 census. However, in 1992 they were estimated to be as many as 15,000. Most live in the areas of the Balkan range, Mount Rila and northeastern Bulgaria. In 1991, they established the Federation of the Cultural and Educational Associations of Karakachans in Sliven.

The Sarakatsani in Bulgaria call themselves Bulgarian Karakachans, since they live in Bulgaria, where their ancestors, in a few cases, were also born. Contrary to their Greek dialect and self-identification, the Bulgarian government regards the Sarakatsani as an ethnic group separate from other Greeks in Bulgaria. Bulgarians consider them to be probably of Aromanian or Slavic origin. An alternative Bulgarian theory claims that the Sarakatsani are descendants of Hellenized Thracians who, because of their isolation in the mountains, were not Slavicised.

== Rootlessness and ritualization ==
In her book An Island Apart, the travel writer Sarah Wheeler traces scions of the Sarakatsani in Euboea. They can also be found in the island of Poros. She writes:

I was fascinated by this elusive, aloof transhumant tribe with beguilingly mysterious origin. They fanned out all over the Balkans and have most closely associated with the Pindus and the Rodopi mountains in the northern mainland: in the fifties there were about 80,000 of them. They spent half of the year in their mountain pastures and the other half in their lowlands. Their rootlessness was balanced by an elaborate ritualization of almost every aspect of their lives, from costume to the moral code. Evia was the only island used by the Sarakatsani except Poros which was the furthest south they ever got (and perhaps Aegina too). In Evia they were, until this century, only found in the chunk of the island from the Chalcis-Kymi axis northwards about as far an Ayianna, and the cluster of villages around Skiloyanni constituted the most heavily settled Sarakatsani region on the island. There were 50 Sarakatsani families living on Mount Kandili, working as resin gatherers encased in layers of elaborate costume. Photographs taken only few decades ago of Sarakatsani women in traditional costume sitting outside their wigwam-shaped branch woven huts. Many of them had quite an un-Greek looks, and were fair; perhaps that explains the blond heads you see now. The Sarkatsanoi were known by various names by the indigenous population, usually based on where they were perceived to have come from, and in Evia they were generally called Roumi, Romi or Roumeliotes after the Roumeli region. People often spoke of them misleadingly as Vlachs. They are settled now, mainly as farmers, with their own permanent pasture land. Their story is one of total assimilation.

== Notable Sarakatsani ==
Military figures

- Antonis Katsantonis, a klepht
- Georgios Karaiskakis, a hero of the Greek War of Independence
- Anastasios Karatasos, a commander of the Greek War of Independence
- Dimitrios Karatasos, a chieftain of the Greek War of Independence

Politicians

- Alexandros Karathodoros
- Lefteris Zagoritis
- Georgios Souflias
- Dimitris Koutsoumpas, General Secretary of the Communist Party of Greece

== Gallery ==
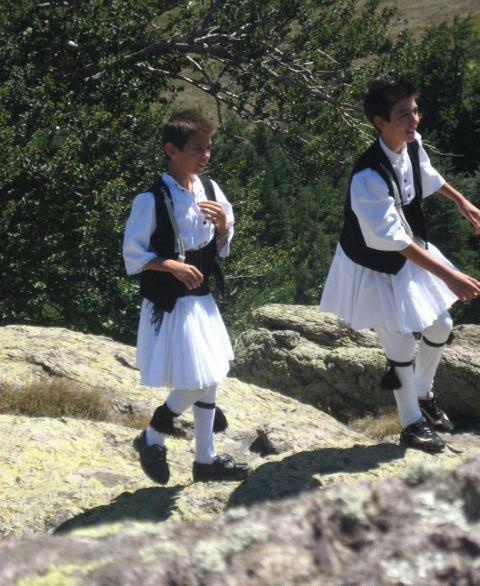
Sarakatsani children in fustanella

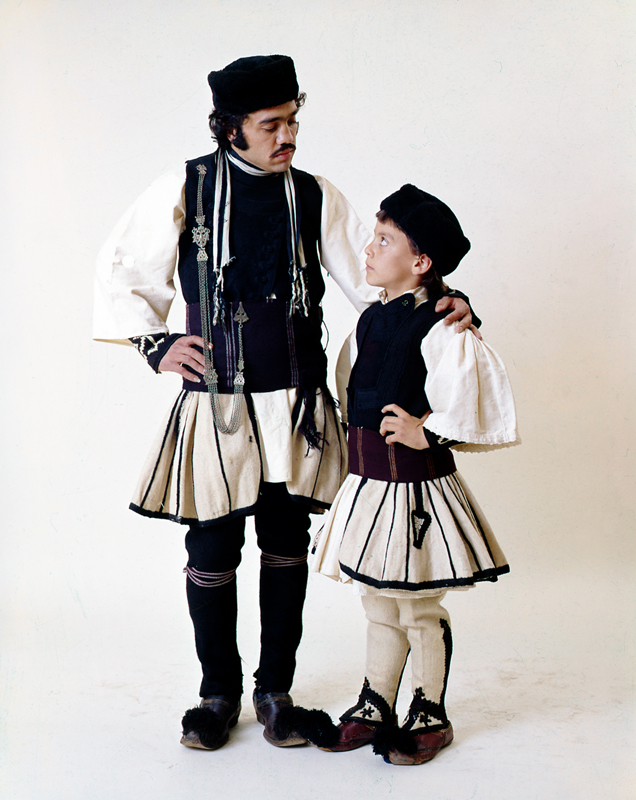
A man and a boy wearing the traditional costumes of the Sarakatsani of Thrace (PFF archive).

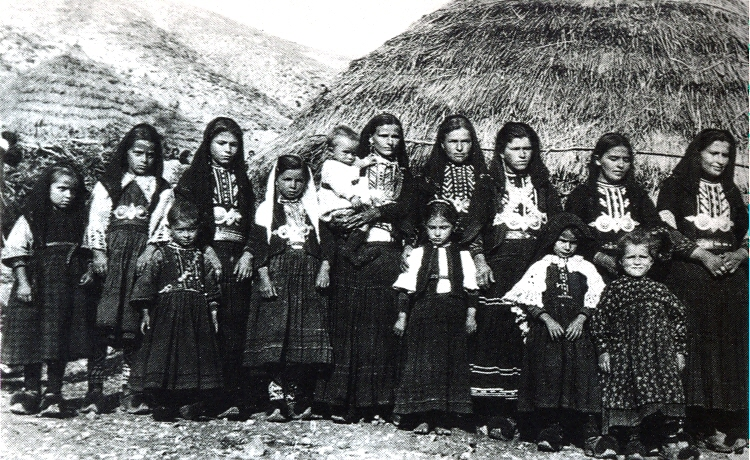
Sarakatsani women and girls in 1922; Epirus, Greece

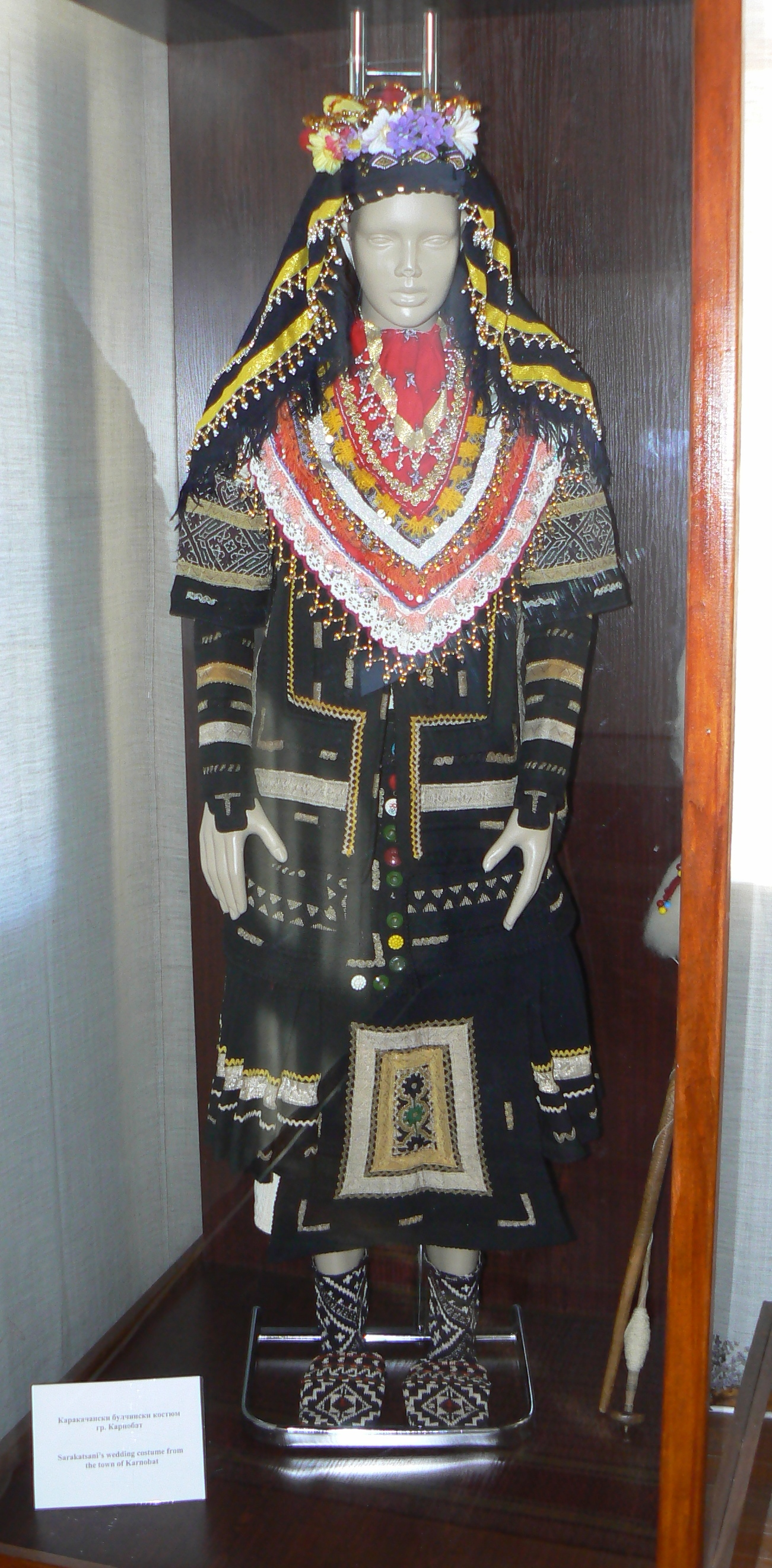
Traditional Sarakatsani female wedding costume from Karnobat, Bulgaria

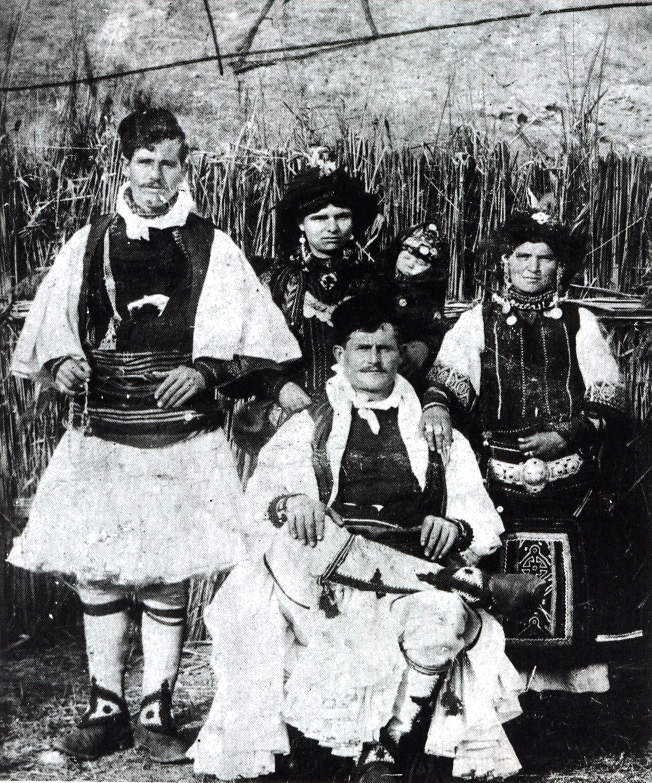
Sarakatsani family in Thrace, 1938

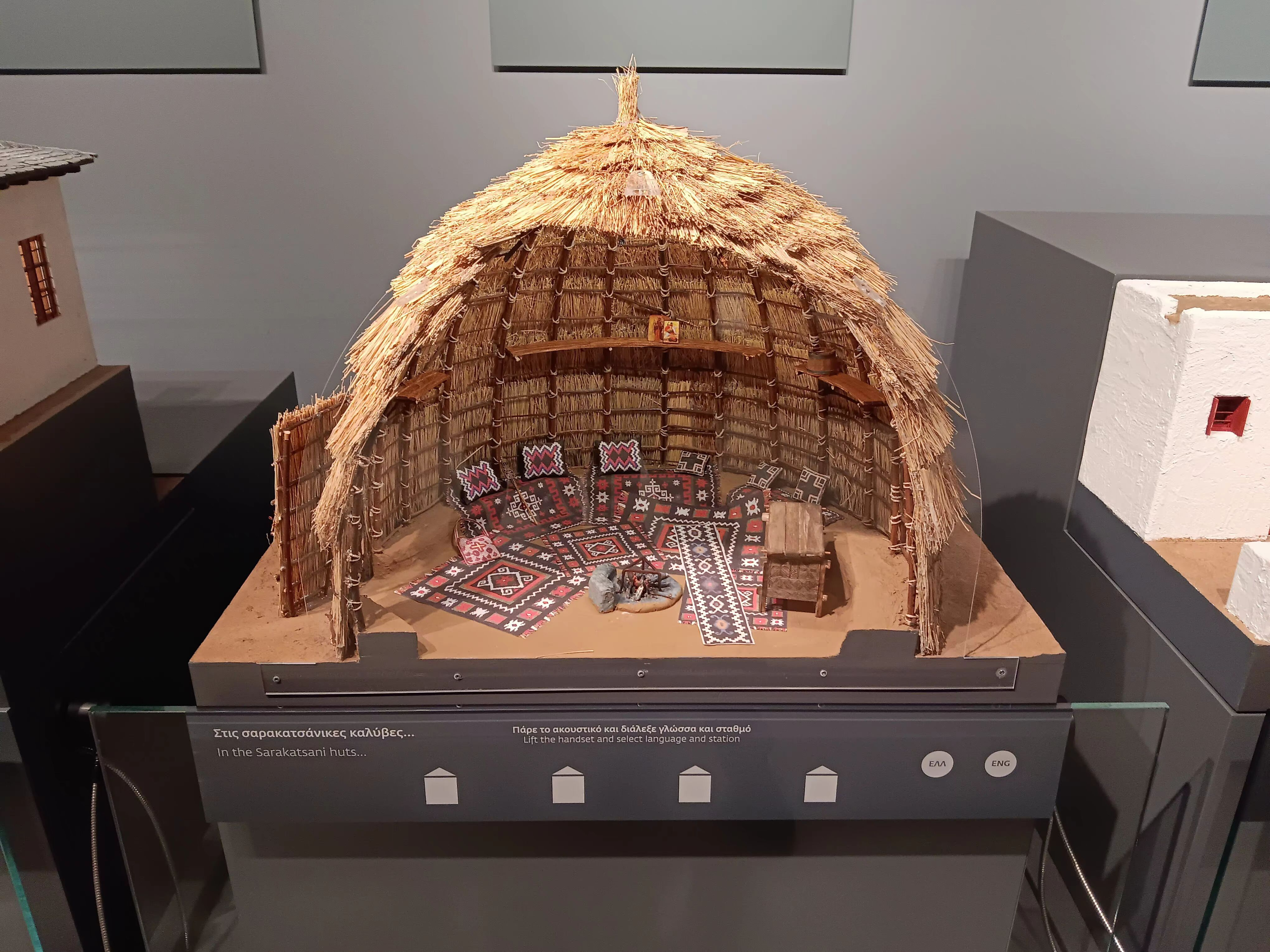
Model of a Sarakatsani hut

== Bibliography ==
- Aravantinos, Panagiotis (1856). Χρονογραφία της Ηπείρου [Chonography of Epirus] (in Greek). Athens: S.K. Vlastos.
- Aravantinos, Panagiotis (1905) [Composed 1865]. Μονογραφία περί Κουτσόβλαχων [Monograph on the Koutsovlachs] (in Greek). Athens: Spyridon Kousoulinos.
- Campbell, John K. (1964). Honour, family, and patronage: A study of institutions and moral values in a Greek mountain community. Oxford: Clarendon Press. ISBN 978-0-195-19756-3.
- Clogg, Richard (2002). "The Sarakatsani and the klephtic tradition". Minorities in Greece: Aspects of a Plural Society. C. Hurst & Co. Publishers. pp. 165–178. ISBN 978-1-850-65706-4.
- Horden, Peregrine; Purcell, Nicholas (2000). The corrupting sea: a study of Mediterranean history. Wiley. ISBN 978-0-631-21890-6.
- Katsaros, Nikos (1995). Οι αρχαιοελληνικές ρίζες του Σαρακατσάνικου λόγου [Ancient Greek roots of the Sarakatsanika tongue] (in Greek). Athens: I.Sideris.
- Kavvadias, Georgios (1965). Nomadic shepherds of the Mediterranean: The Sarakatsani of Greece. Paris: Gauthier-Villars.
- Levinson, David (1998). "Greece". Ethnic groups worldwide. Greenwood Publishing Group. pp. 40–42. ISBN 978-1-573-56019-1.
- Pimpireva, Zhenia (1995). Каракачаните в България [Karakachans in Bulgaria] (in Bulgarian). Св. Климент Охридски. ISBN 978-9-540-70276-6.
- Poulianos, Aris (1993). Sarakatsani: the most ancient people of Europe.
- Tsaousis, Vasilis (2006). Σαρακατσάνοι, οι σταυραετοί της Πίνδου [Sarakatsani, the booted eagles of Pindus] (in Greek). Sarakatsani Folklore Museum. ISBN 978-9-608-61701-8.
