= Seymen, Silivri =

Seymen
- Neighbourhood
- Location in Turkey Seymen (Istanbul)
- Coordinates: 41°09′26″N 28°10′07″E
- Country: Turkey
- Province: Istanbul
- District: Silivri
- Population (2024): 1,032
- Time zone: UTC+3 (TRT)

Seymen is a neighbourhood in the municipality and district of Silivri, Istanbul Province, Turkey. Carbon Mapper estimates that its landfill emitted over 6 tonnes of methane per hour in 2025.
