= Silivri Kalepark =

Park in Istanbul, Turkey

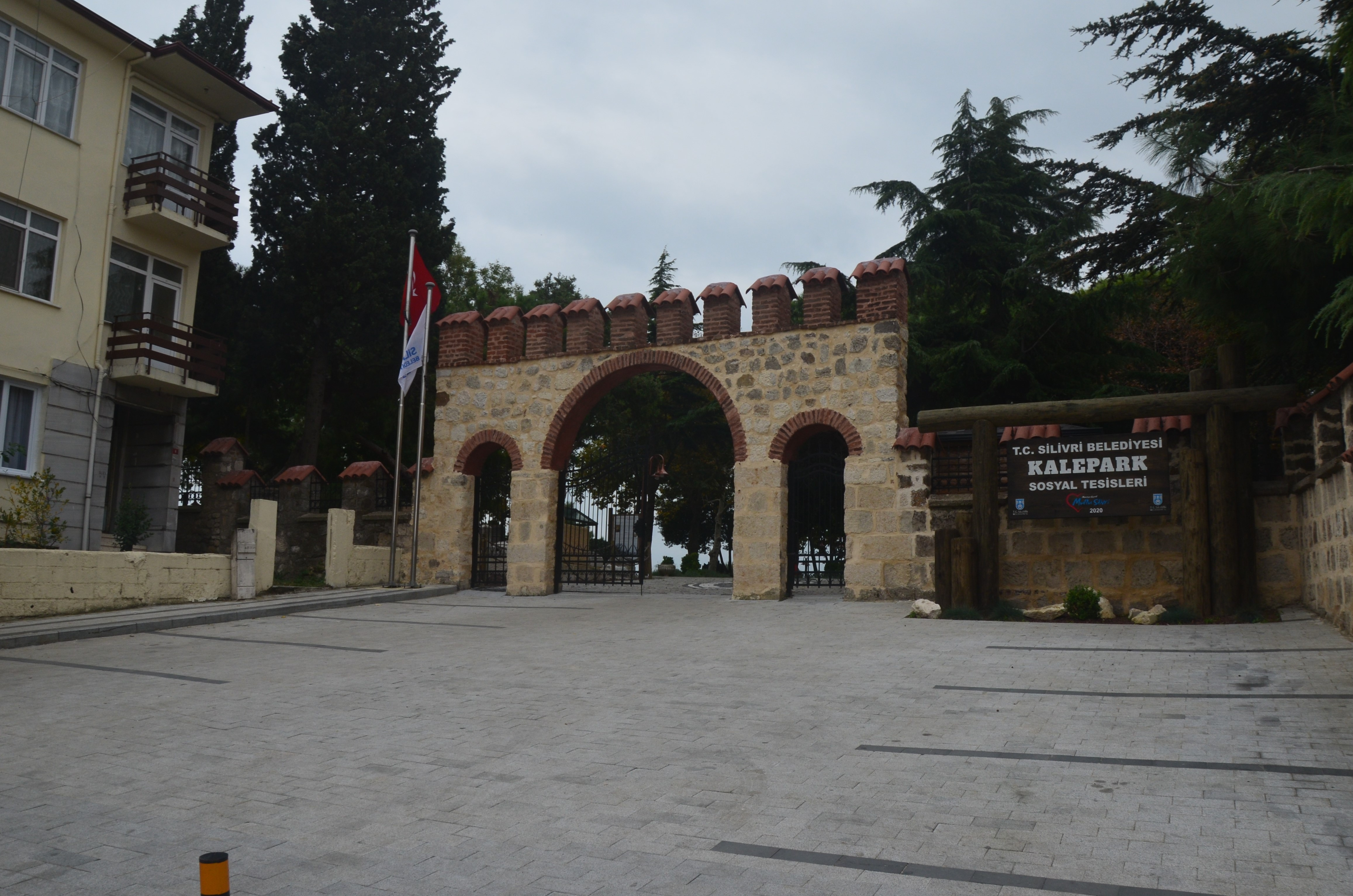
- Main gate to the Silivri Kalepark
- Interactive map of Silivri Kalepark
- Location: Istanbul, Turkey
- Coordinates: 41°04′10″N 28°14′54″E

Silivri Kalepark is an urban park situated inside the historic castle (Turkish: kale) in Silivri district of Istanbul Province, Turkey. Owned by the local municipality, it was opened in 2020 after restoration works. It contains an open-air museum exhibiting stone artifacts found in and around the town.

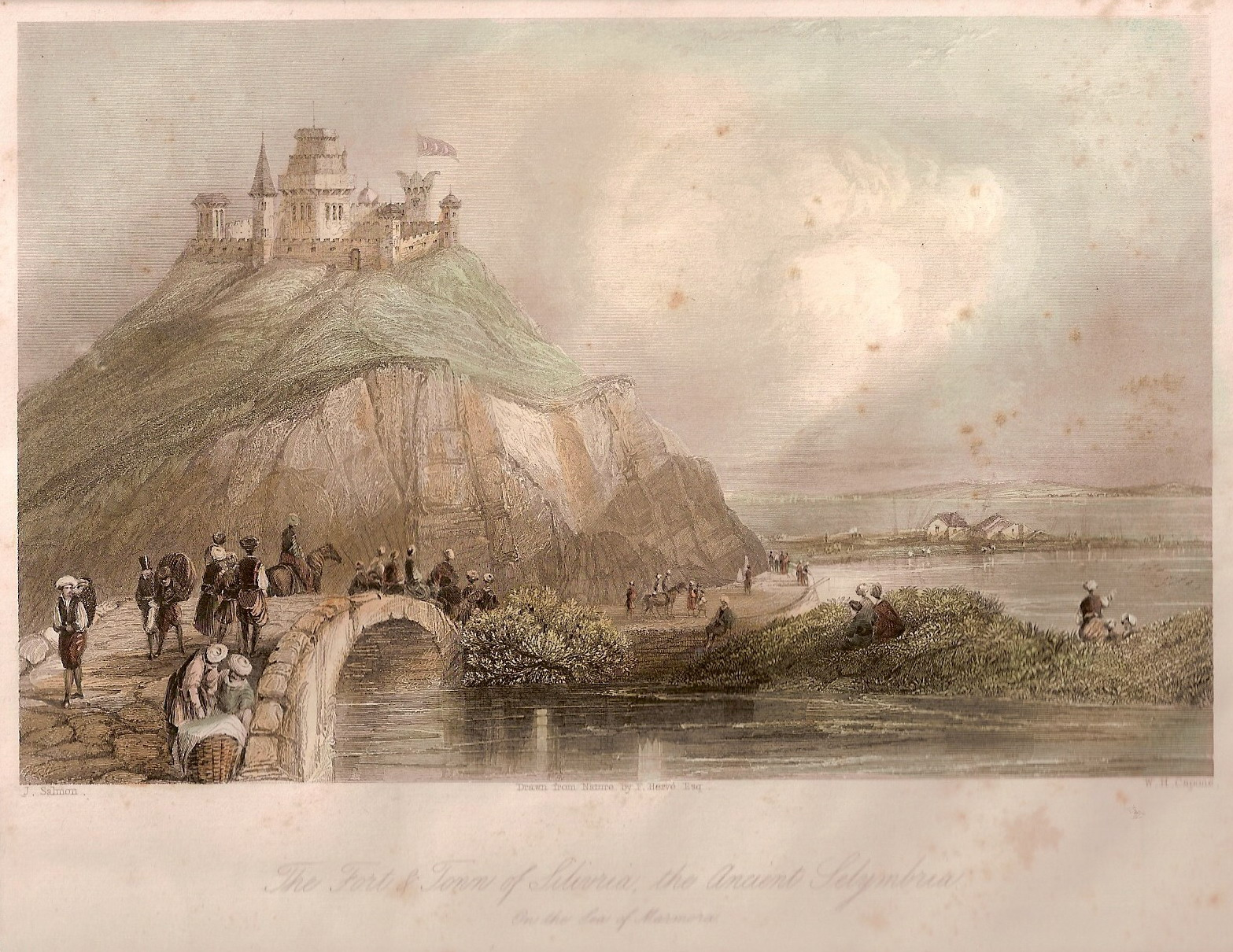
"The fort and town of Silivria, the ancient Selymbria, on the Sea of Marmara" Drawn from nature by Francis Hervé, Esq (about 1832)..

The park is situated inside the historic castle located on the top of a hill at the seaside, a 47 m (154 ft)-high cliff. The castle is dated to the 3rd century AD while mosdt of the remains are from the 9th and 12th century. The park was opened after restoration works by the local municipality on 30 August 2020. The open-air museum features around 150 stone artifacts from the Roman, Byzantine and Ottoman periods found in and around Silivri. There is an open-air cafe and coffeehouse inside the park.

== Gallery ==
Some exhibits of the open-air museum in the Silivri Kalepark:

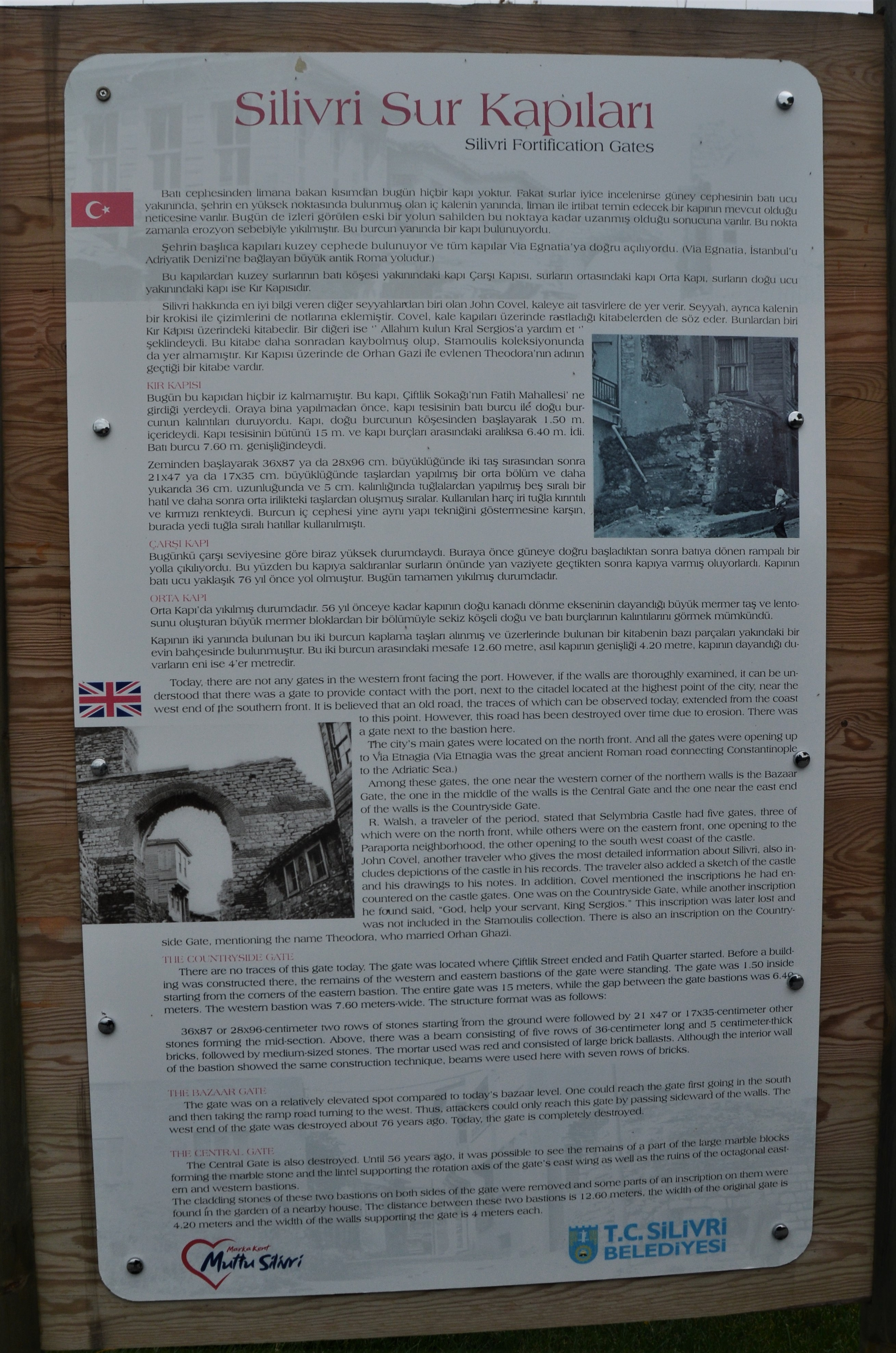
Bilingual information board about the castle

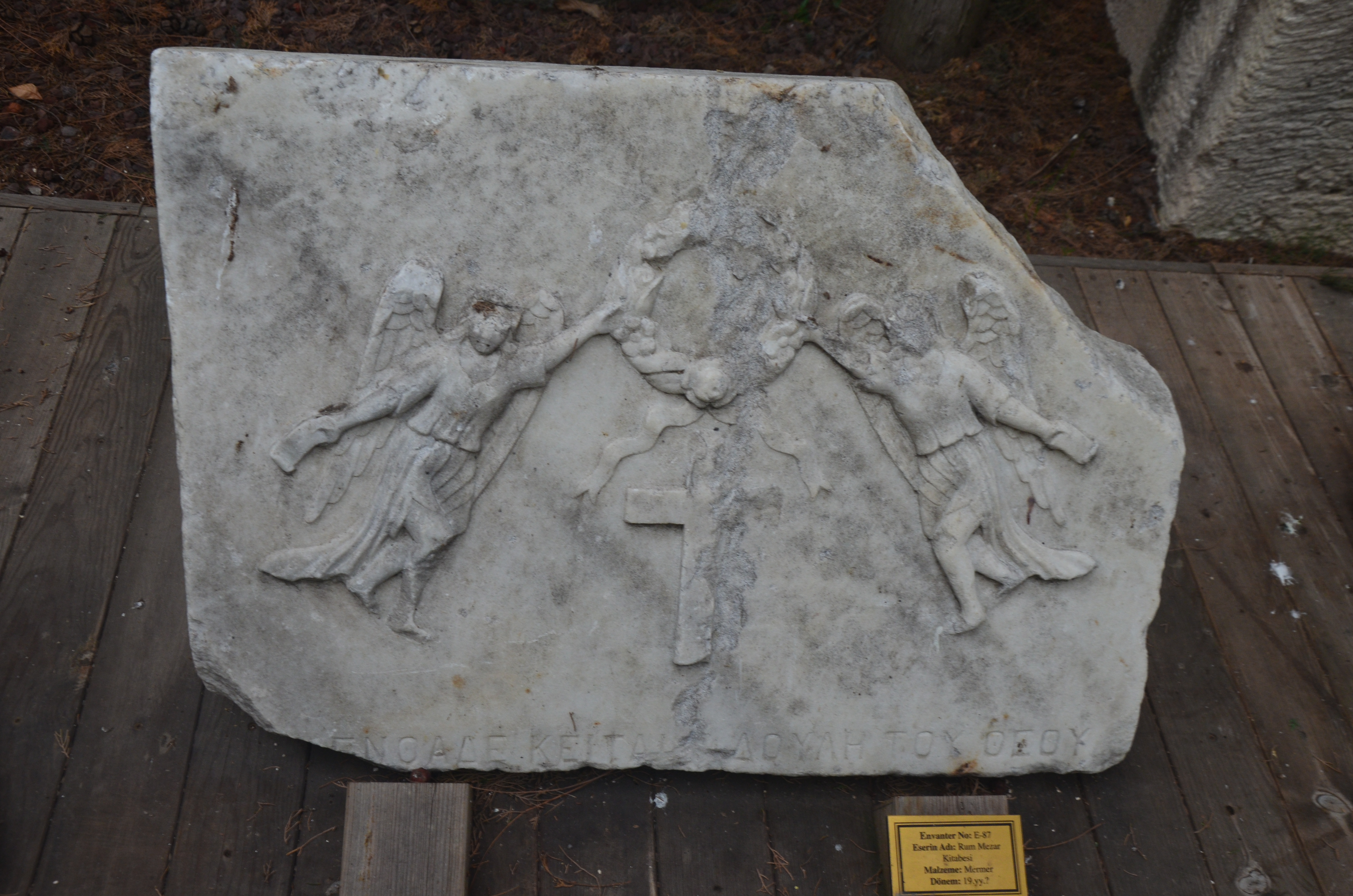
Byzantine relief ornament on stone

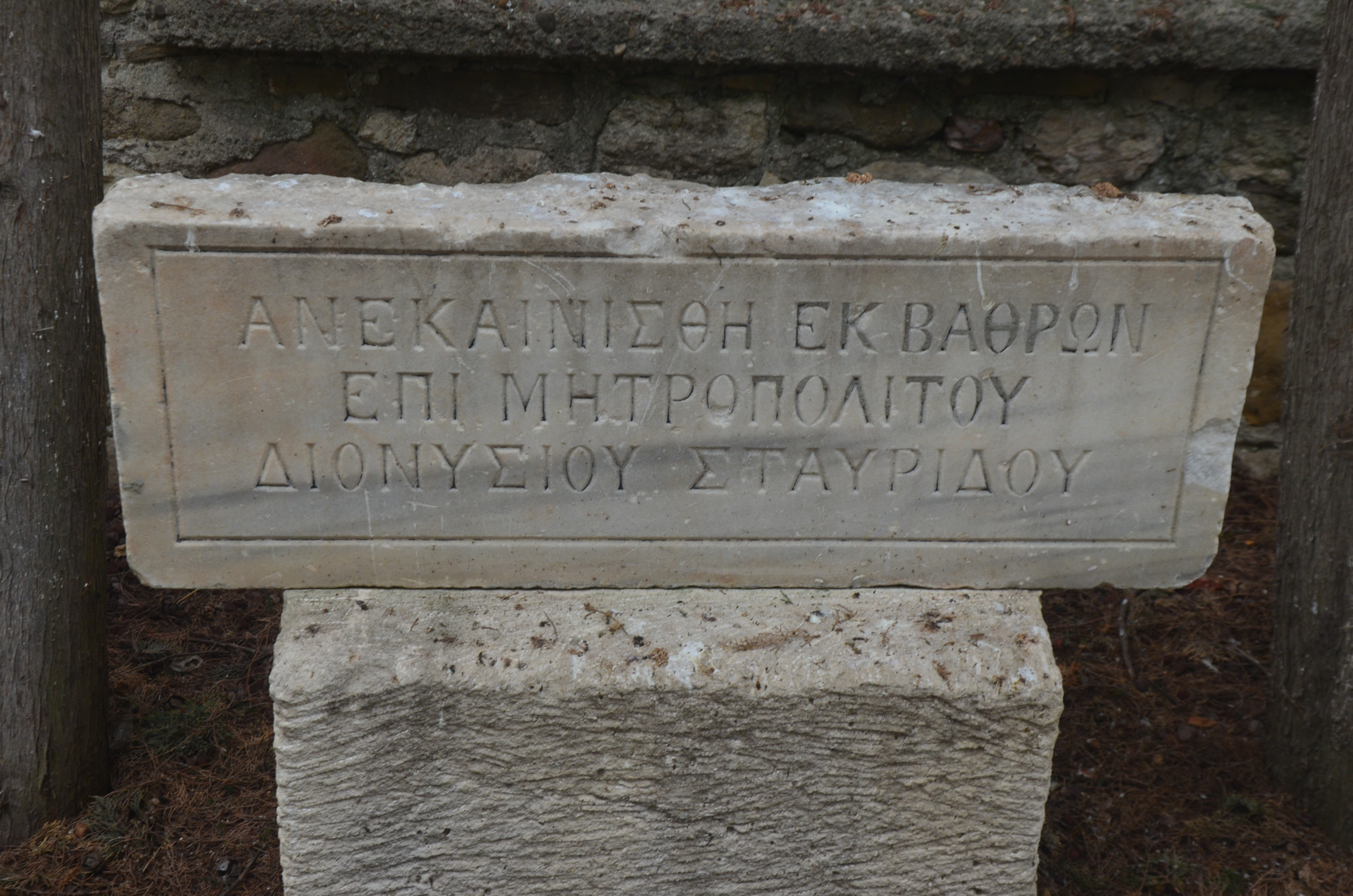
Greek-language inscription

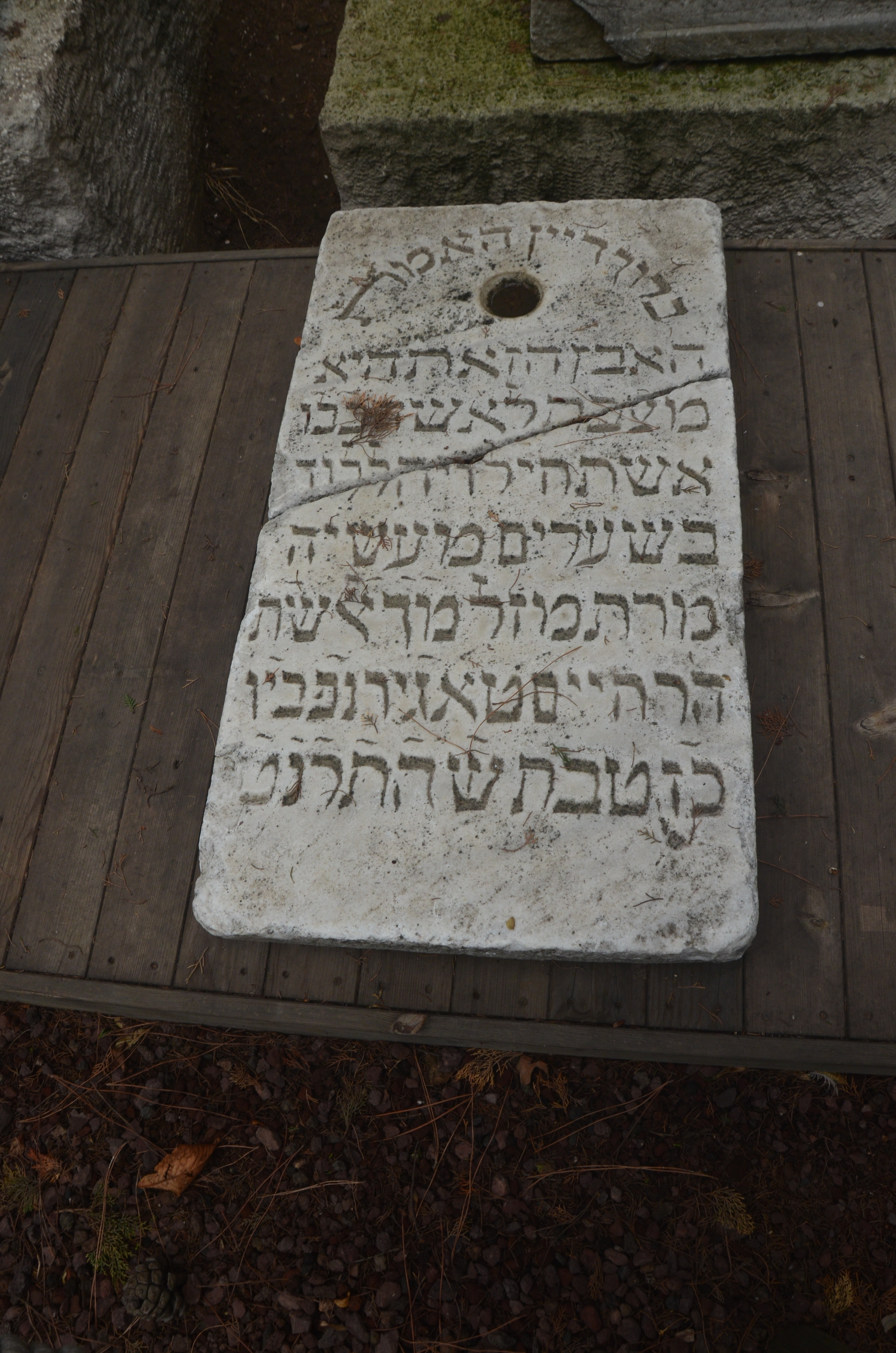
Hebrew-language inscription

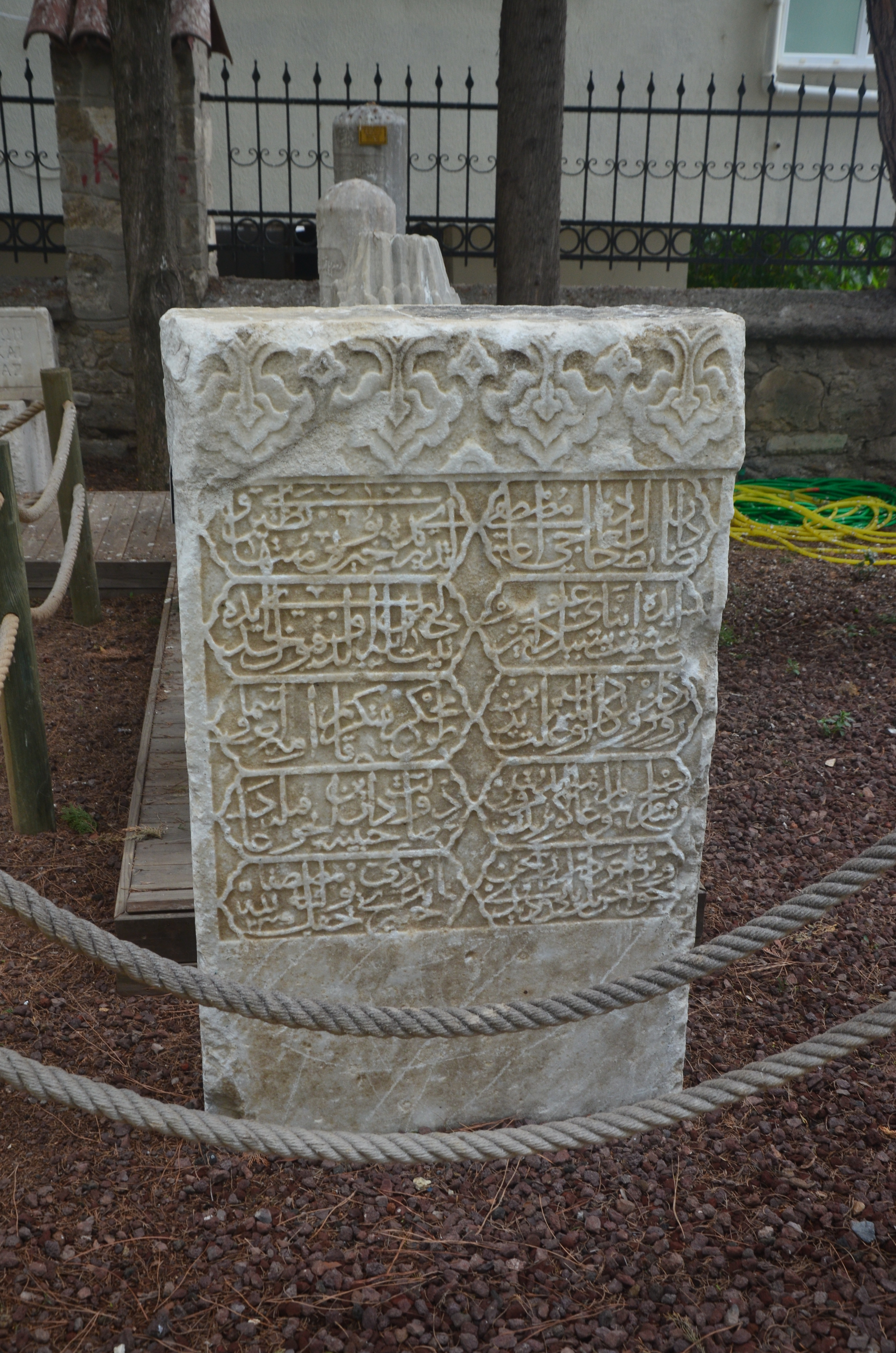
Ottoman Turkish-language gravestone

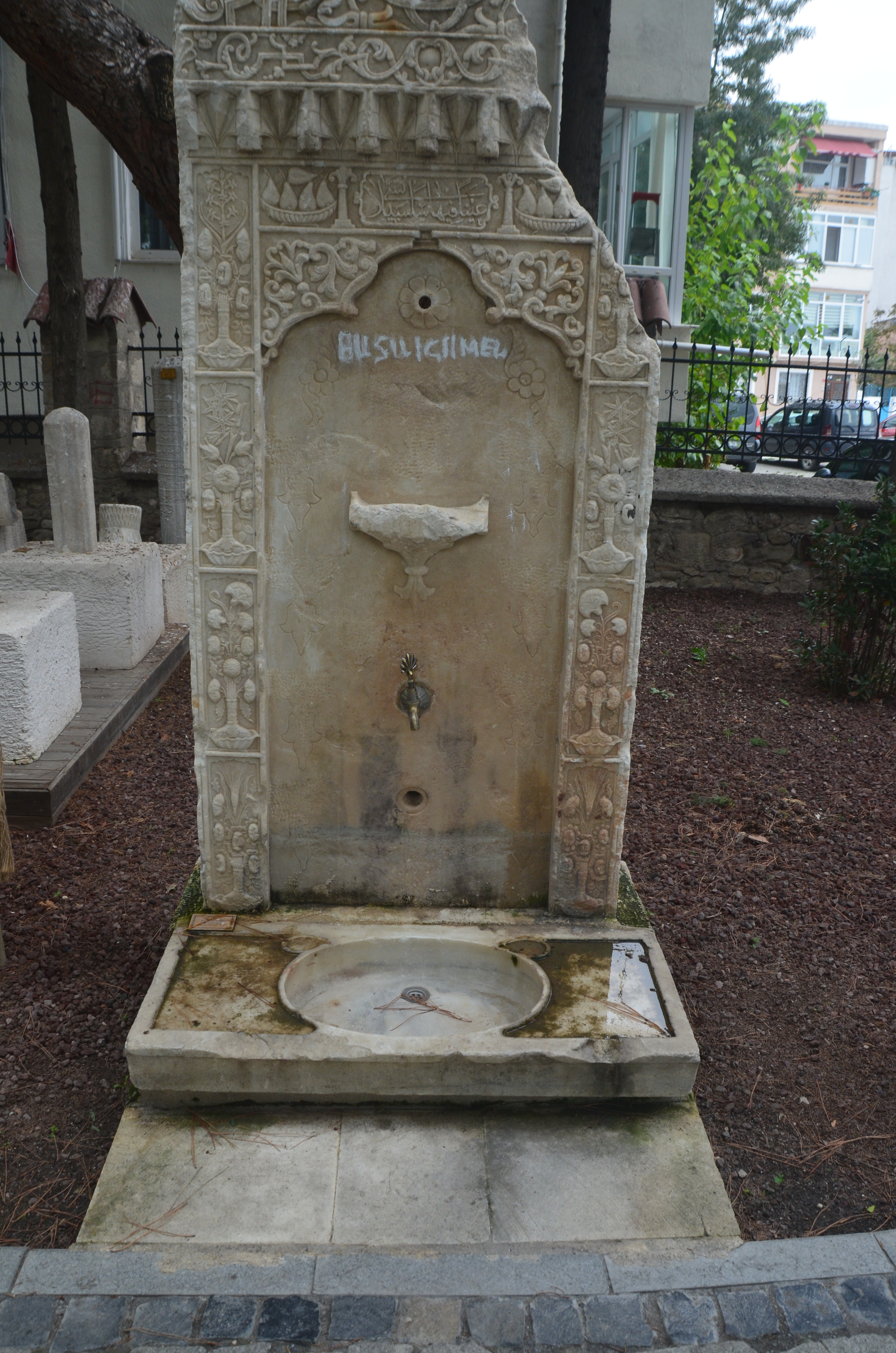
Ottoman period fountain
