= Müjdat =

Müjdat is a Turkish given name for males. Notable people with the name include:

- Müjdat Gezen (born 1943), Turkish theatre actor and writer
- Müjdat Gürsu (1971–1994), Turkish footballer
- Müjdat Yetkiner (born 1961), Turkish footballer
