= Andrew Hussey =

British cultural historian & biographer (born 1963)

Andrew Hussey OBE (born 1963) is an English historian of French culture and biographer. He has published multiple books, focusing primarily on 20th century French history and biography.

== Early life ==
Born in Liverpool, Hussey was educated at the University of Manchester and the Jean Moulin University Lyon 3. He received his PhD for a thesis on Georges Bataille, eventually published as his first book.

== Career ==
His biography of Guy Debord was named by Julian Barnes as International Book of the Year in the Times Literary Supplement in 2001.

Andrew Hussey's voice
Recorded November 2008 from the BBC Radio 4 programme Start the Week

Hussey lectured in French at the University of Huddersfield in the 1990s. He was a senior lecturer in French at the University of Wales Aberystwyth and since 2006 he has been the dean of the University of London Institute in Paris. In 2014 he was appointed Director of the Centre for Post-Colonial Studies at the University of London's School of Advanced Study. He began his career as a journalist writing for Julie Burchill's Modern Review in the early 1990s. He now regularly contributes to The Observer, New Statesman, Granta and Literary Review.

In 2007, Hussey provided the foreword to How to Enjoy Paris in 1842, written by Francis Hervé. He is well known for his book Paris: The Secret History, described by Peter Ackroyd in The Times as "endlessly informative, with a story on every page". It was well reviewed in the United Kingdom, the United States and in France, where it was shortlisted for the Prix Grandgousier. It has been translated into ten languages.

In 2021, Hussey's book The Strange and Enchanted Life of Isidore Isou, about the Letterist artist Isidore Isou, was published by Reaktion Books.

== Media appearances ==
Hussey also presents television documentaries, amongst which is France on a Plate, first broadcast in December 2009. In this programme, he discusses the culinary history of France in relation to its political and social history.

== Honours ==
He was appointed Officer of the Order of the British Empire (OBE) in the 2011 New Year Honours for services to UK–France cultural relations.

== Bibliography ==
- The Inner Scar: The Mysticism of Georges Bataille. 2000.
- The Game of War: The Life and Death of Guy Debord, 2001
- The Beast at Heaven’s Gate: Georges Bataille and the Art of Transgression, 2006
- Paris: The Secret History (L'histoire cachée de Paris), 2006
- The French Intifada: The Long War Between France and its Arabs (Insurrections en France: Du Maghreb colonial aux émeutes de banlieues, histoire d'une longue guerre), 2014, traduit sous le titre
- "Paris is an open prison". Letter from France. New Statesman. 149 (5514): 42–43. 3–23 April 2020.
- The Strange and Enchanted Life of Isidore Isou, 2021
- Fractured France: A Journey Through a Divided Nation, 2025

== TV works ==
- France on a Plate BBC Four (2010)
- The North on a Plate BBC Four (2011)
- Treasures of the Louvre BBC Four (2013)

== Radio ==
- Albert Camus - Inside the Outsider, BBC Radio 3, (2013).
- (about James Joyce:) Paris–Zurich–Trieste: Joyce l’European, BBC Radio 4, (2022).
