= Silivri =

- District and municipality
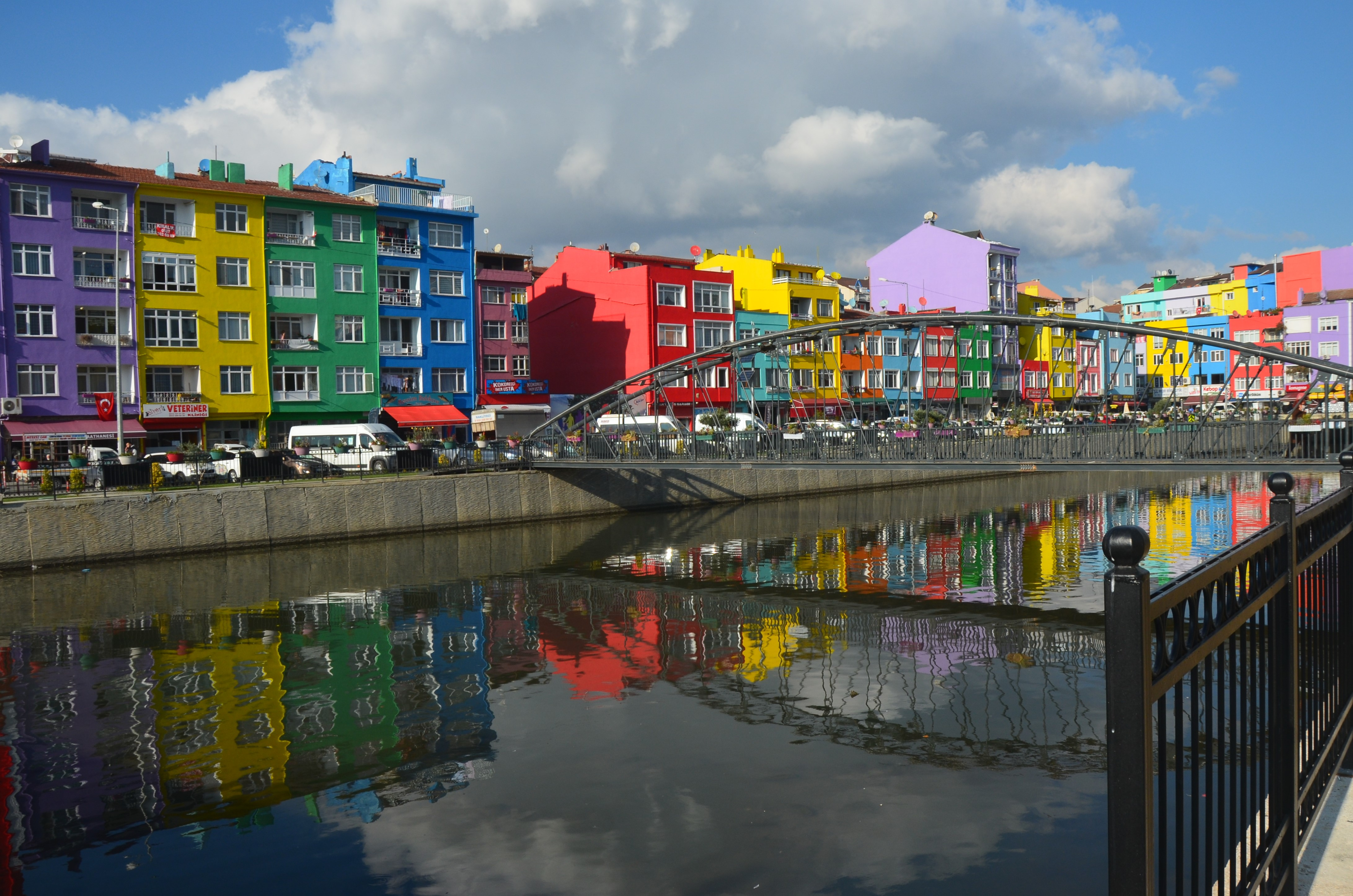
- Pedestrian bridge in Silivri

- Logo

- Map showing Silivri District in Istanbul Province

- Location within Turkey Location within Istanbul
- Coordinates: 41°04′25″N 28°14′52″E
- Country: Turkey
- Province: Istanbul

Government
  - Mayor: Bora Balcıoğlu (CHP)
- Area: 858 km^{2} (331 sq mi)
- Population (2022): 217,163
  - Density: 253/km^{2} (656/sq mi)
- Time zone: UTC+3 (TRT)
- Postal code: 34570
- Area code: 0212
- Website: www.silivri.bel.tr

Silivri is a municipality and district of Istanbul Province, Turkey. The population is 217,163 (2022). Lying along the Sea of Marmara, outside the urban core of Istanbul, the district contains many holiday and weekend homes for residents of the city. The largest settlement in the district is also named Silivri.

Silivri is located bordering Büyükçekmece to the east, Çatalca to the north, Çorlu and Marmara Ereğlisi (both districts of Tekirdağ Province) to the west, Çerkezköy to the north-west (one of Tekirdağ Province) and with the Sea of Marmara to the south. It is, with an area of 858 km^{2} (331 sq mi), the second largest district of Istanbul Province after Çatalca. The seat of the district is the city of Silivri.

Established in 2008, Turkey's most modern (and Europe's largest) prison complex is located 9 km (5.6 mi) west of Silivri.

== History ==
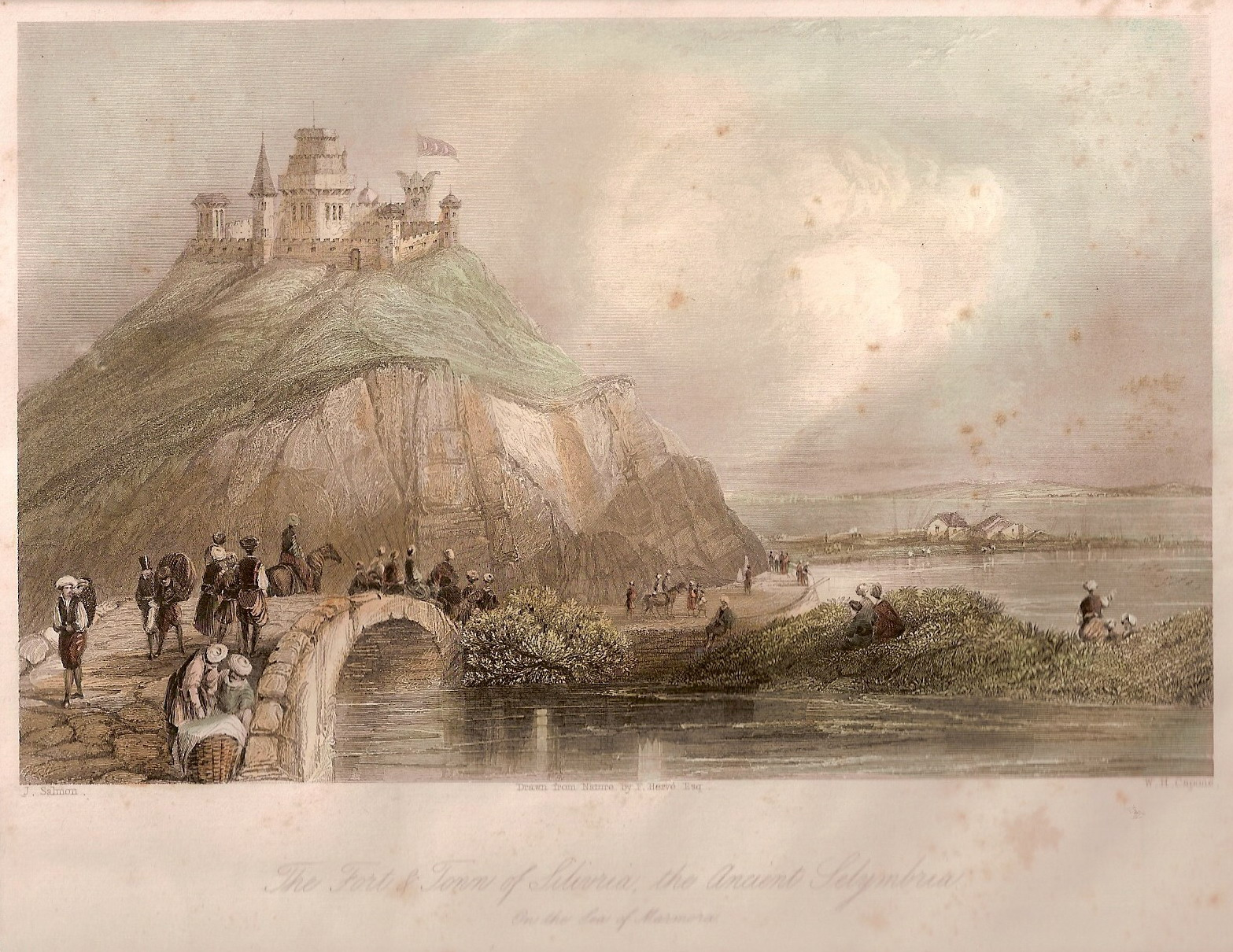
The fort and town of Silivria, the ancient Selymbria, on the Sea of Marmara – Drawn from nature by F. Hervé, Esq. (about 1832). Courtesy of Gürhan Altan, Istanbul

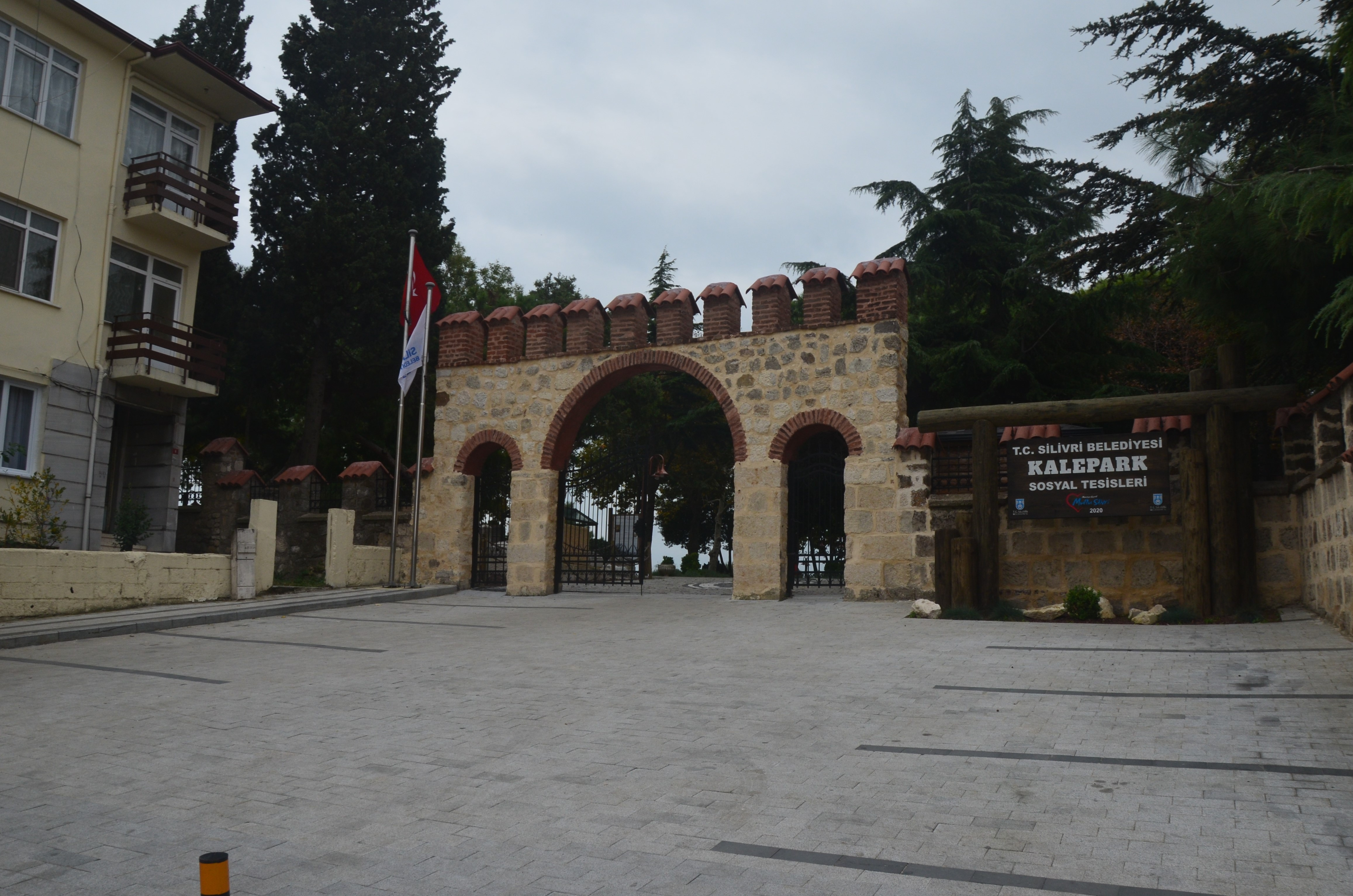
Gate of the Silivri Castle on the top of a hill at the seaside, today an urban park.

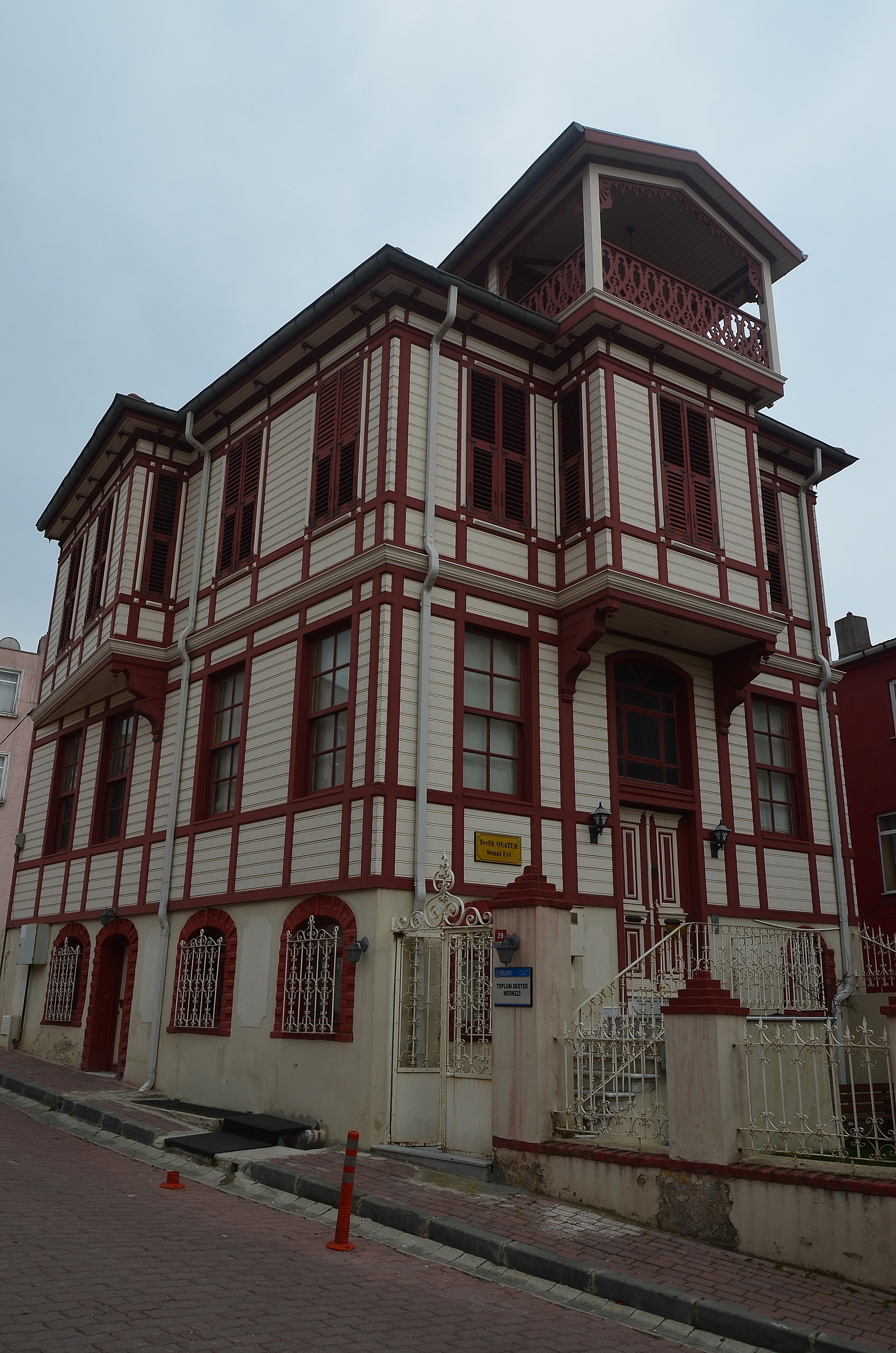
Traditional Ottoman house in Silivri

=== Ancient ===
Silivri, the ancient Greek Selymbria or Selybria (Greek: Σηλυ(μ)βρία), owed its historical importance to the natural harbor and its position on the major commercial roads. It was a colony of Megara founded on a steep 56 m high hill east of the bay, but excavations show that it was a Thracian settlement before it was a Greek colony.

According to Strabo, the city's name is a combination of the name of the mythological founder of the city, Selus, and the Thracian word that Strabo thought was used for polis, "bria". This, however, did not mean polis, and had another meaning.

Selymbria is the birthplace of the physician Herodicus, and was an ally of the Athenians in 351 BC. Until the second half of the 2nd century BC, the city could preserve its autonomy, but after its neighbours Byzantium and Perinthos became more powerful, the city fell under their control during the next centuries. The settlement shrank into a village under the governance of the Roman Empire. In the early 5th century, the town was officially renamed Eudoxiopolis (Greek: Εὐδοξιόπολις), during the reign of the Byzantine emperor Arcadius (377–408), after his wife Aelia Eudoxia, though this name did not survive.

=== Medieval ===
In 805 AD, the Bulgarian Khan Kroum pillaged the town. In the late 9th century, Emperor Michael III constructed a fortress on the top of the hill, the ruins of which still remain, during an era in which the Byzantine Empire suffered attacks by Saracen corsairs and Rus raiders. With the Fourth Crusade, and the fall of Constantinople to the Latin Empire in 1204, the fortress fell in quick succession to the Latin Empire, Bulgarian, back to the Latins and finally was recaptured by the Byzantine successor state of the Empire of Nicaea in 1247, who were finally able to recapture Constantinople and restore the empire in 1261.

In 1346, the Ottomans became an ally of the pretender for the Emperor John VI Cantacuzenus (1292–1383), and helped him against his rival John V Palaeologus (1332–1391). The same year, Sultan Orhan I married Theodora, the daughter of John VI in Selymbria.

In 1399, Selymbria fell to the Ottomans, marking their complete encirclement of Constantinople by land in Europe. Many contemporary observers believed from then on it was a mere matter of time before the Ottomans took the Byzantine capital. However, after their disastrous defeat at the hands of Timur the Ottomans returned Selymbria and several other possessions to the Byzantines in 1403. It was sometimes attacked by the Ottomans in later years, but was not captured.

During the Fall of Constantinople in 1453, Selymbria, along with Epibatos, stood up against the Ottoman armies, and surrendered only after the city had fallen. The town remained a summer resort during the Ottoman time, as it was during the Byzantine era.

=== Modern ===
On the order of Suleiman the Magnificent, architect Mimar Sinan built 1562 a stone bridge with 33 arches just west of Silivri. The historical bridge, called "Uzunköprü" (The "Long Bridge"), is still in use today, however one arch is not visible due to sedimentation.

Prior to World War I, some Silivrian Jews immigrated to the town of Camagüey, Cuba. Russians occupied Silivri on February 5, 1878 for 1 month until 3 March 1878. Bulgarians occupied it on November 16, 1912 for 9 months until May 30, 1913.

During the war, many more Sephardim in the city left as conditions worsened due to the war. Many of these Turkish Jews emigrated to the United States settling primarily in New York and Seattle. Others went to Palestine, France and South America.

According to the Treaty of Sèvres, Silivri became a part of Greece on July 20, 1920. However, Italians took it over from the withdrawing Greek troops on October 22, 1922, according to the Armistice of Mudanya. Finally, Turkish forces entered Silivri on November 1, 1922. It was part of Çatalca province between 1923–1926 and was bounded to Istanbul Province in 1926. It was enlarged with joining of Gümüşyaka (formerly Eski Ereğli) village from Çorlu district.

== Composition ==
There are 35 neighbourhoods in Silivri District:

- Akören
- Alibey
- Alipaşa
- Bekirli
- Beyciler
- Büyük Çavuşlu
- Büyük Kılıçlı
- Büyük Sinekli
- Çanta Balaban
- Çanta Sancaktepe
- Çayırdere
- Çeltik
- Cumhuriyet
- Danamandıra
- Değirmenköy İsmetpaşa
- Değitmenköy Fevzipaşa
- Fatih
- Fener
- Gazitepe
- Gümüşyaka
- Kadıköy
- Kavaklı
- Kavaklı İstiklal
- Küçük Kılıçlı
- Küçük Sinekli
- Kurfallı
- Mimar Sinan
- Ortaköy
- Piri Mehmet Paşa
- Sayalar
- Selimpaşa
- Semizkumlar
- Seymen
- Yeni
- Yolçatı

== Holiday resort ==
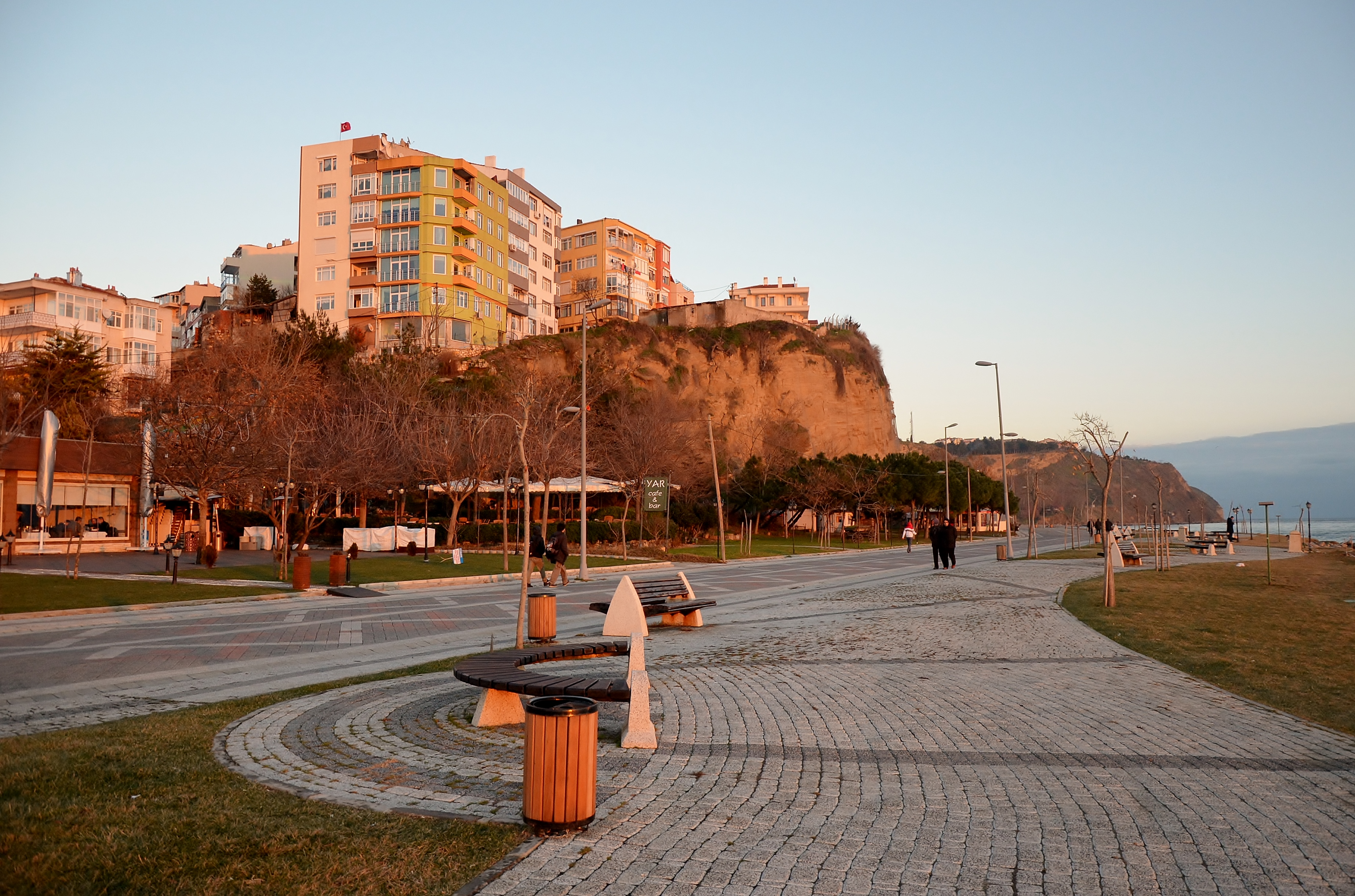
Silivri coast and the hill

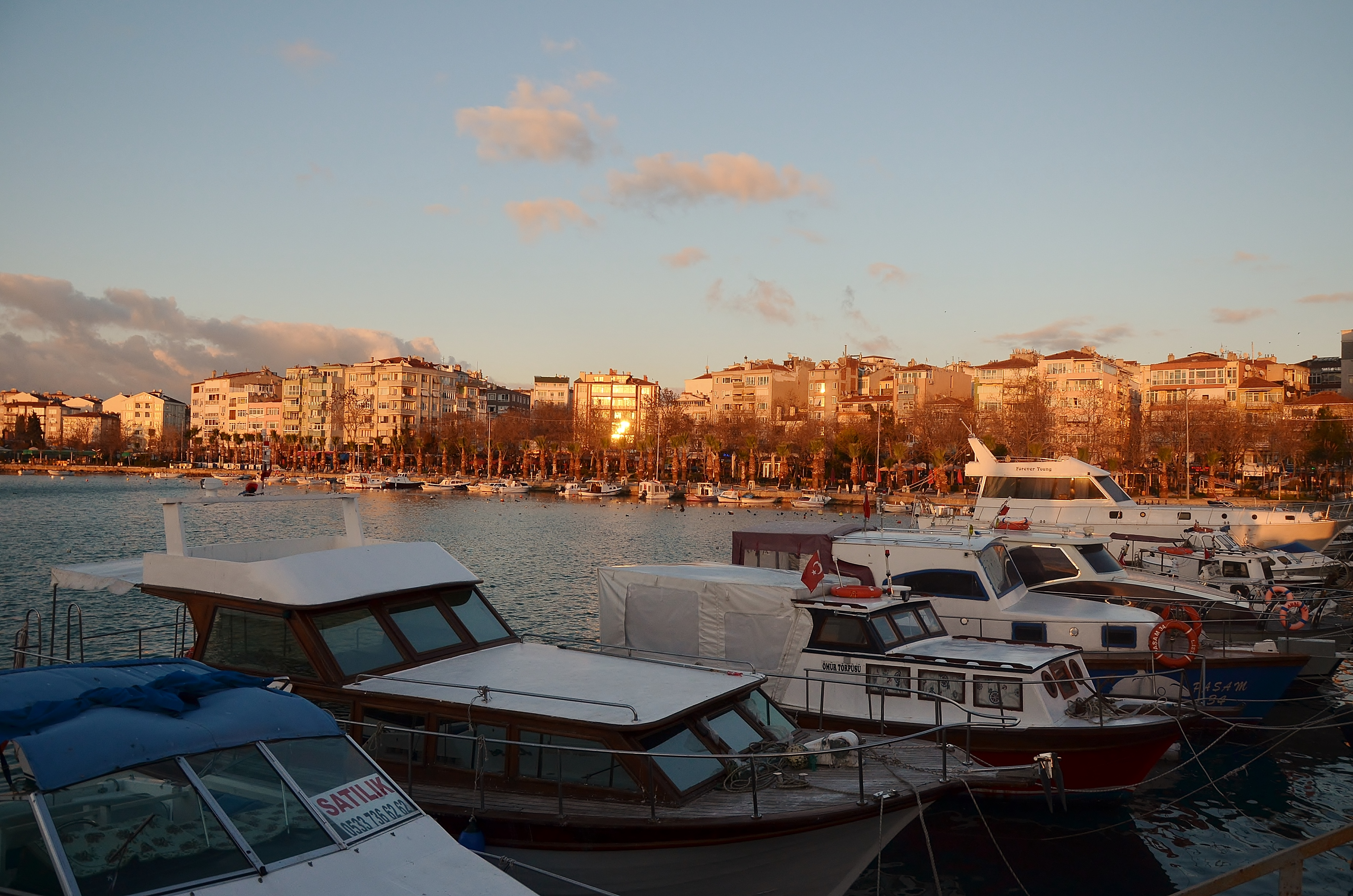
Marina and Promenade of Silivri in the background

During the summer months, the population increases 4–5 times. Silivri is 67 km (42 mi) far from the city center of Istanbul, and is a popular summer resort for many Istanbul residents with its 45-kilometre-long (28 mi) coast. It is on the highway D.100 and the motorway E80, which connect Turkey to Europe via Edirne. It takes about an hour and a half to get here from the city so is feasible for use in the summer months as a weekend and holiday retreat, although the road out here is heaving with traffic in summer.

Being accessible from Istanbul, the Marmara coast has long been used for holidaying by Istanbul's people. As the city has grown, these facilities have moved further and further away. Once Florya and Yeşilköy were resorts, today it is Tekirdağ and even further. Silivri had its heyday in the 1960s and 1970s as families would come by the busload to complexes of holiday flats that were built on the beach. The Marmara Sea suffered from pollution in the 1980s and 1990s but now efforts have been made to clean it up. All the facilities are located in the holiday housing area, the town centre of Silivri has little to offer in the way of cinema, theatre or any other cultural amenities.

Now the coast has also been blessed with resort hotels and country clubs with sports facilities including golf courses, horse riding centres and tennis courts, health and conference centers. At weekend the area is crowded with day trippers.

Development has left few stretches of undeveloped coastline.

The winter months are cold here, as bitter weather blows across Thrace from the Balkans, and holiday homes in Silivri are not much used from mid-September until May or even June.

== Agriculture ==
The district has great agricultural potential thanks to its almost flat landscape, mild Thracian climate and yield-effective soil, and in the 1950s and 1960s the pasture was so rich that the yogurt of Silivri was renowned. Now the reputation of the yogurt has declined due to poor quality control and mismanagement of the brand. The Silivri Yoğurt Festivali used to be a major event but nowadays there is less interest and in some years it is not even held. Wheat (246 km^{2}), sunflower (105 km^{2}) and barley (50 km^{2}) are cultivated here. Vineyards were once important but have declined since the 1970s. Livestock is still important.

== Sports ==
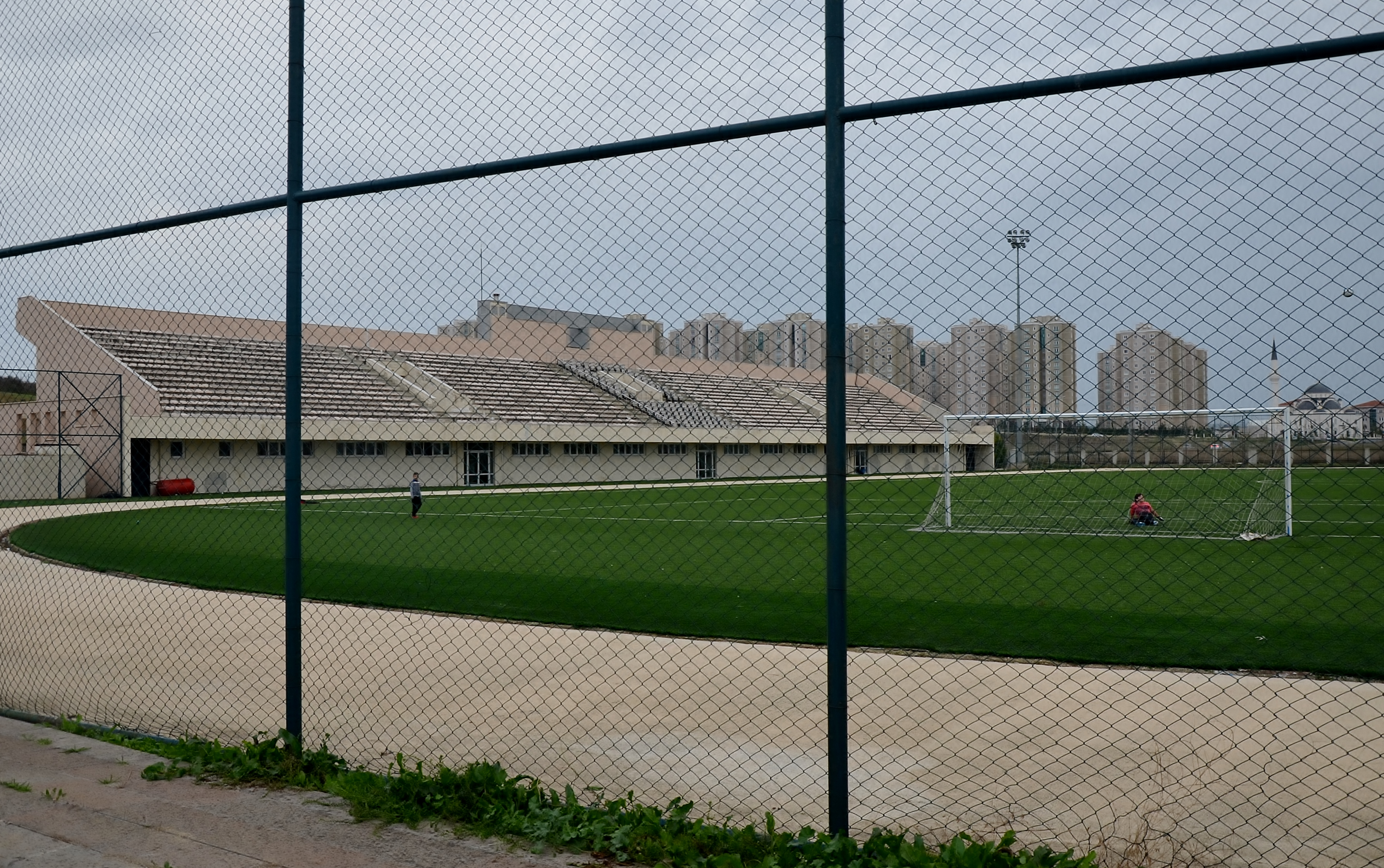
Silivri Stadium.

Silivri has two sports clubs Silivrispor and Alibeyspor. Established in 1957, Silivrispor has two active branches, football and basketball. Silivrispor's professional football team play in the Spor Toto 3rd League. The basketball section eas founded in 2014. Alibeyspor, named after a neighborhood of Silivri, was established in 1989. The club's main activity is in football. Their amateur football team play in the Istanbul Super Amateuar League, and the women's team in the Turkish Women's Third League.

Sport venues in Silivri are the 2,700-seating capacity Müjdat Gürsu Stadium, named after Müjdat Gürsu (1971–1994) a local footballer, and Alibey Sport Hall.

== High schools ==
- Silivri Lisesi (Silivri High School) Visit web site
- Silivri Atatürk Anadolu Lisesi (Anatolian High School) Visit web site
- Hasan – Sabriye Gümüş Anadolu Lisesi (Hasan-Sabriye Gumus Anatolian High School) Visit web site
- Özel Balkan Lisesi (Private Balkan High School) Visit web site
- Necip Sarıbekir Lisesi
- Teknik Lise ve Endüstri Meslek Lisesi (Technical High School and Industry – Vocational High School) Visit web site
- Şerife Baldöktü Meslek Lisesi (Şerife Baldöktü Vocational High School) Visit web site

== Health ==
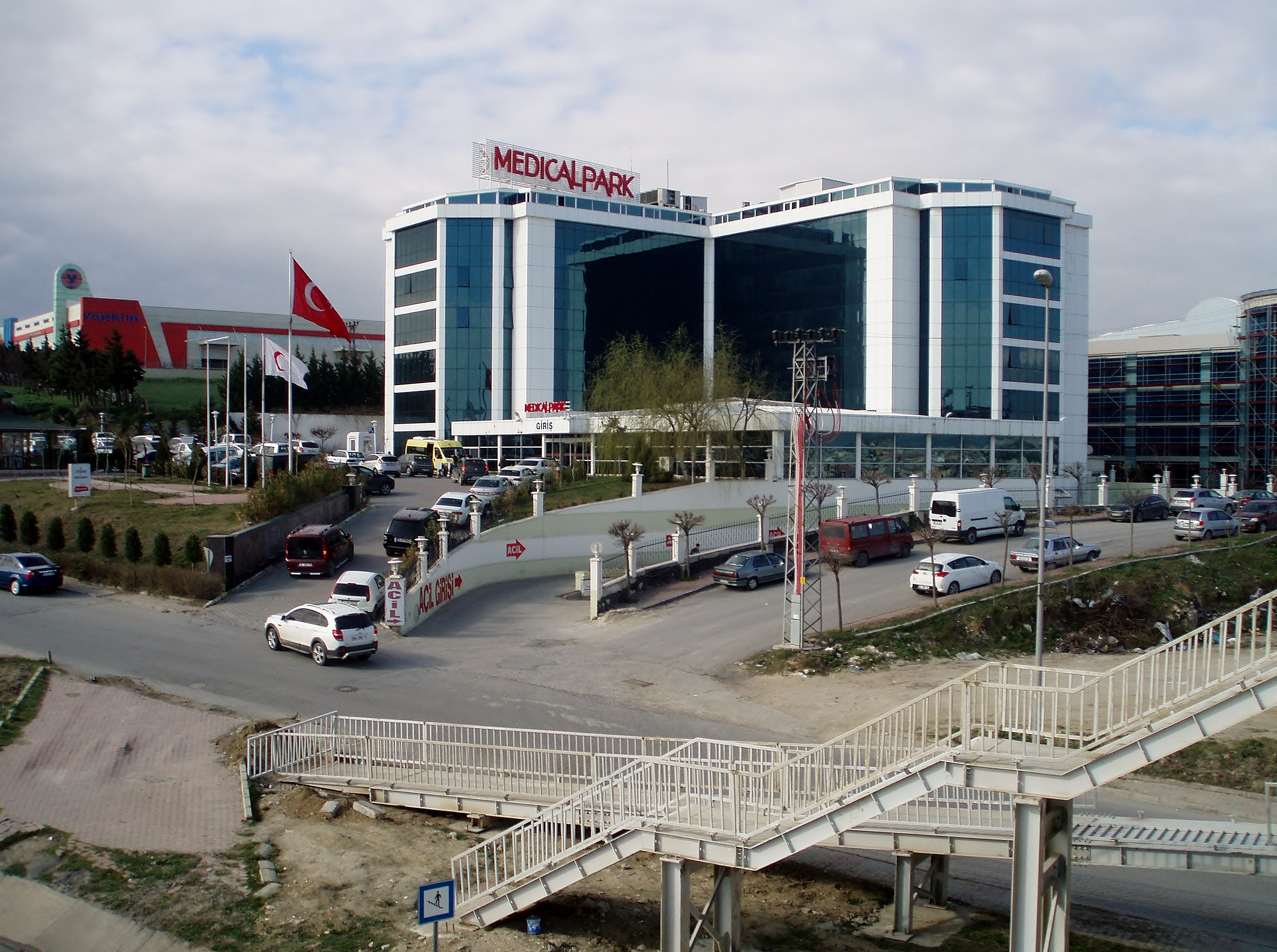
Anadolu Hospital (formerly Medical Park Hospital).

There are a number of hospitals and special health institutions in Silivri, state owned and private run:

State owned health institutions (Ministry of Health)

- Silivri Devlet Hastanesi (Silivri State Hospital)
- Ana Çocuk Sağlığı Ve Aile Planlama Merkezi (Mother and Child Healthcare and Family Planning Center)
- Halk Sağlığı Laboratuvarı (Public Health Laboratory)

Private health institutions

- Serene Tıp Merke(zi (Medical center)
- Anadolu Hospital (formerly Medical Park Hospital)
- Hayat Hastanesi (closed)
- Hayat Diyaliz Merkezi (Dialysis center)
- Kolan Hastanesi (closed [tr])

== Main sights ==
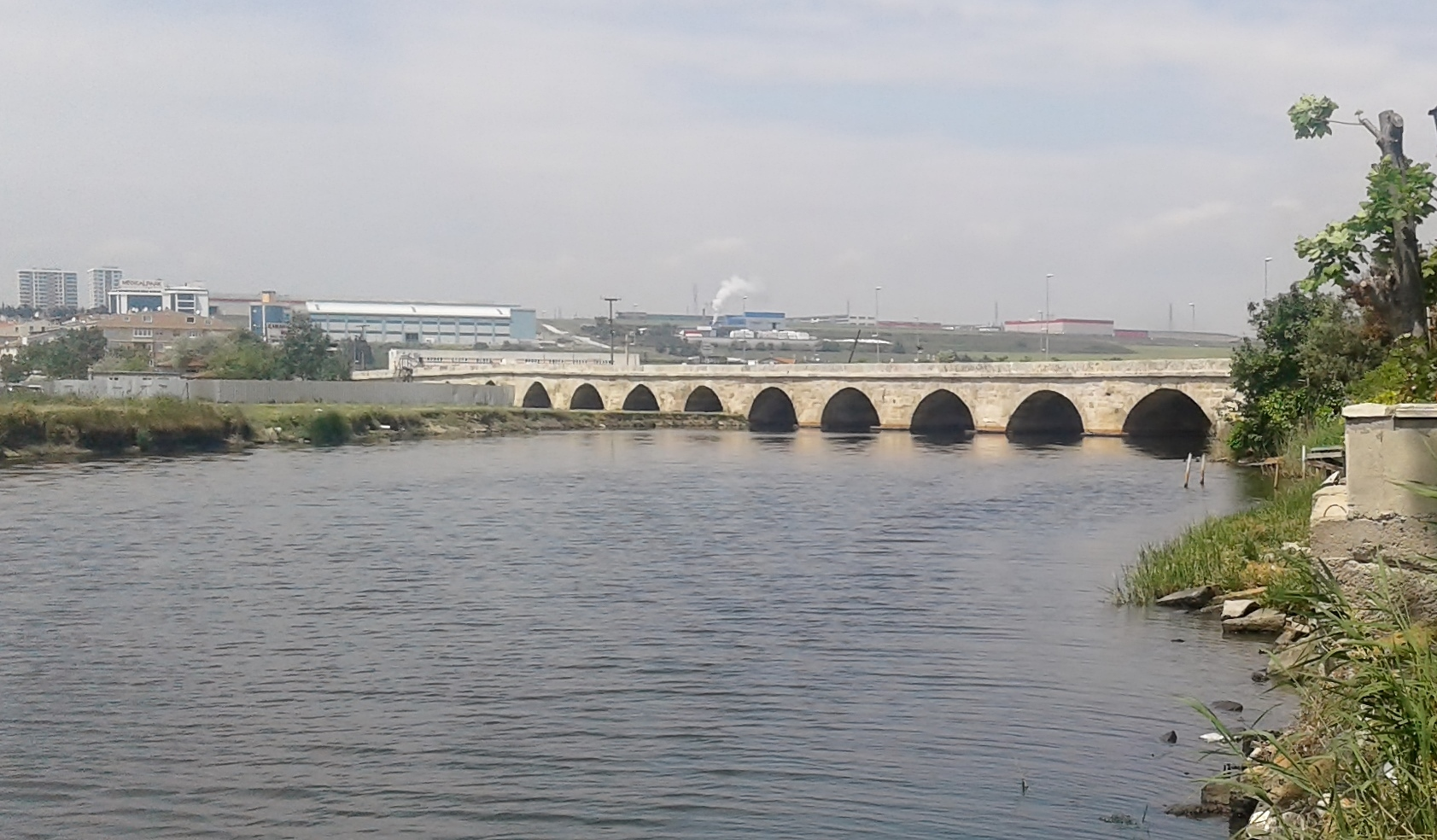
Uzunköprü ("The Long Bridge").

- The Anastasian Wall, also known as the Long Walls of Thrace, was constructed by Byzantine emperor Anastasius I (491–518) as part of an additional outer defense system for Constantinople during the 5th century and probably was in use until the 7th century. Comparable only with Hadrian's Wall in England in its complexity and preservation, the fortification stretches some 56 km from Black Sea coast across the Thracian peninsula to the Sea of Marmara at west of Silivri.
- Cistern
- Piri Mehmed Pasha Mosque
- The Long Bridge of 32 arches (Uzunköprü) dating from the 1560s
- Silivri Kalepark, an urban public park inside the Silivri Castle,
- The Byzantine church of Saint Spyridon occupied the highest point in the city before its demolition in the 1920s. It was described in the Turkish Embassy Letters.

== People ==
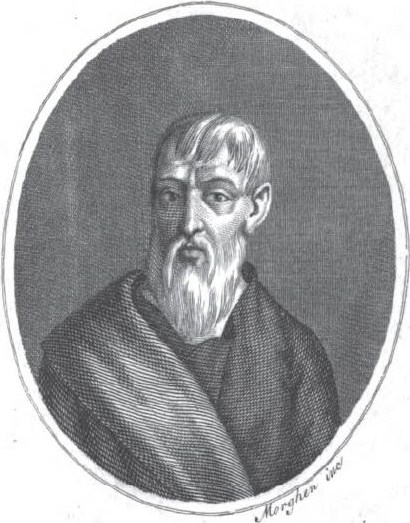
Herodicus (5th century BC)

- Ozge Torer (born 1999) Turkish actress
- Herodicus (5th century BC), Greek physician
- Nectarios of Aegina (1846–1920), Saint of the Eastern Orthodox Church
- Oğuz Aral (1936–2004), renowned political cartoonist
- Yorgo Bacanos (1900–1977), master oud player of Ottoman classical music
- Mihri Belli (1916–2011), communist leader
- Uğur Dündar (born 1943), journalist, political commentator and writer
- Müjdat Gürsu (1971–1994), professional footballer
- Ruben Sevak (1885-1915), Armenian poet
- Eleftherios Stavridis (1893–1966), ex General Secretary of the Communist Party of Greece who turned into an anti-communist figure.
- Abdullah Turhan (1933-2020), cartoonist

== Twin towns – sister cities ==
Silivri is twinned with:

- Aytos, Bulgaria
- Câmpina, Romania
- Constanța, Romania
- Kardzhali, Bulgaria
- Nyasvizh, Belarus
- Stari Grad (Sarajevo), Bosnia and Herzegovina
- Velingrad, Bulgaria

== See also ==
- Çanta Wind Farm, a 47.5-MW wind farm consisting of 19 turbines
- Northern Marmara and Değirmenköy (Silivri) Depleted Gas Reservoir
