= Tanager (satellite) =

Greenhouse gas monitoring satellites

Tanager are a series of Earth observation satellites designed to detect and measure emissions of greenhouse gases, particularly methane and carbon dioxide. Tanager-1 is the first satellite deployed for the Carbon Mapper initiative and was launched on 16 August 2024. Tanager-2, also developed as part of the Carbon Mapper satellite constellation, is a satellite planned for the detection and quantification of greenhouse gas emissions.

== Background ==
Tanager-1 was developed to improve the detection and monitoring of high-intensity greenhouse gas emission sources, including methane emissions from industrial infrastructure. The mission forms part of broader efforts to expand satellite-based atmospheric monitoring and provide data for scientific and policy applications. Tanager-2 is a continuation of this project.

== Development and launch ==
Tanager-1 was developed through the Carbon Mapper partnership, which includes NASA's Jet Propulsion Laboratory and Planet Labs. Tanager-1 was built by Planet Labs as part of a public-private collaboration involving several scientific and nonprofit organisations and launched on 16 August 2024 aboard SpaceX's Transporter rideshare mission, a Falcon 9 rocket, from Vandenberg Space Force Base in California.

Tanager-2 is also being developed by the Carbon Mapper partnership, and built by Planet Labs.

== Mission and instrumentation ==
Tanager-1 carries a hyperspectral imaging spectrometer that measures reflected light across multiple wavelengths, allowing detection of atmospheric gases based on their spectral signatures. The satellite is designed to detect, locate, and quantify methane and carbon dioxide emissions from specific sources such as landfills and energy infrastructure.

Tanager-2 will also carry a hyperspectral imaging spectrometer developed at NASA's Jet Propulsion Laboratory.

== Operations ==
After commissioning, Tanager-1 entered operational monitoring to support facility-scale greenhouse gas detection, monitoring and tracking. Early observations identified greenhouse gas plumes in several regions following commissioning of the instrument.

Tanager-2 is planned to operate in low Earth orbit, at an orbital altitude of approximately 405 km.

== See also ==
- Earth observation satellite
- Carbon Mapper
- Greenhouse gas monitoring
- Methane emissions
- Planet Labs
- Jet Propulsion Laboratory
