= Herodicus =

5th-century BC Greek physician, dietician and sophist

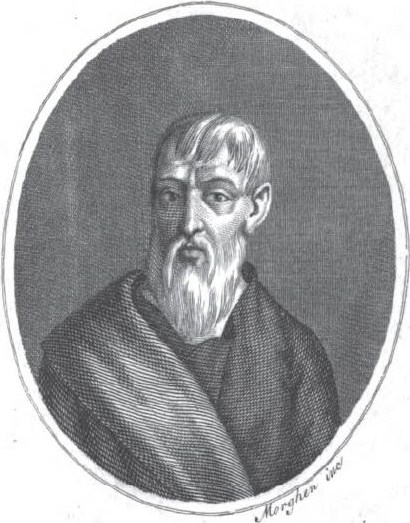
Herodicus.

Herodicus (Greek: Ἡρóδιĸος) was a 5th century BC Greek physician, dietician, sophist, and gymnastic master (παιδοτρίβης). He was born in the city of Selymbria, a colony of the city-state Megara, and practiced medicine in various Greek cities including Selymbria, Megara, Athens, and Cnidos. Herodicus believed that exercise and a good diet are key foundations of health, and emphasized the use of both to treat various ailments. He may have also been one of the tutors of Hippocrates. He also recommended massage using beneficial herbs and oils. His theories are considered the foundation of sports medicine.

== History ==
Herodicus is credited with being the first physician to practice what would become known as therapeutic gymnastics. Herodicus noticed that weak wrestling and boxing athletes gained strength when subjected to rigorous exercise. This observation led Herodicus to start prescribing exercise as a treatment and preventative measure against illness. Maintaining health was just as important to Herodicus as restoring health.

Some scholars believe Hippocrates, often called the father of medicine, was influenced by Herodicus. This is due to the attention Hippocrates gives to hygienic exercise.

In Classical Greece, physicians were seldom allowed inside gymnasiums. Lack of exposure left most Greek physicians of the time unknowledgeable of the effects of exercise. Being both a gymnastics master and a physician gave Herodicus unique insight into the medical applications of exercise. Herodicus is believed to have authored the Ars Gymnastica, a series of gymnastic exercises he used to treat febrile conditions and other illnesses.

Euryphon, a mentor of Herodicus at the medical school of Cnidos, emphasized the importance of diet in maintaining health. He theorized that wastes created through bad digestion spread through the body and caused illness. Herodicus contributed to this theory by adding that proper digestion of food only occurs with subsequent exercise. A failure to move after eating could cause a humoral imbalance between what Herodicus called "sharp and bitter" liquids. Herodicus believed that disease was caused by an imbalance in these two liquids in one or more internal organs. This theory is similar to and may have influenced Hippocrates' humoral theory.

Herodicus advocated also for the use of therapeutic massage. He was specific in the manner that a massage should be given. Herodicus recommended that massage should initially be slow and gentle, then subsequently faster, with the application of more pressure, which was followed by more gentle friction.

Many contemporaries of Herodicus, such as Aristotle, criticized his methods as being too harsh and unpleasant. Herodicus was accused by the author of Epidemics of killing patients with the intensity of his exercise routines. According to Plato, Herodicus recommended that his patients walk from Athens to Megara, a distance of a little more than 20 miles.
