= Rizarios Ecclesiastical School of Athens =

Εducational Ιnstitution in Chalandri, Greece

Coordinates: 38.0306°N 23.7998°E

Rizarios Ecclesiastical School
- Ριζάρειος Εκκλησιαστική Σχολή
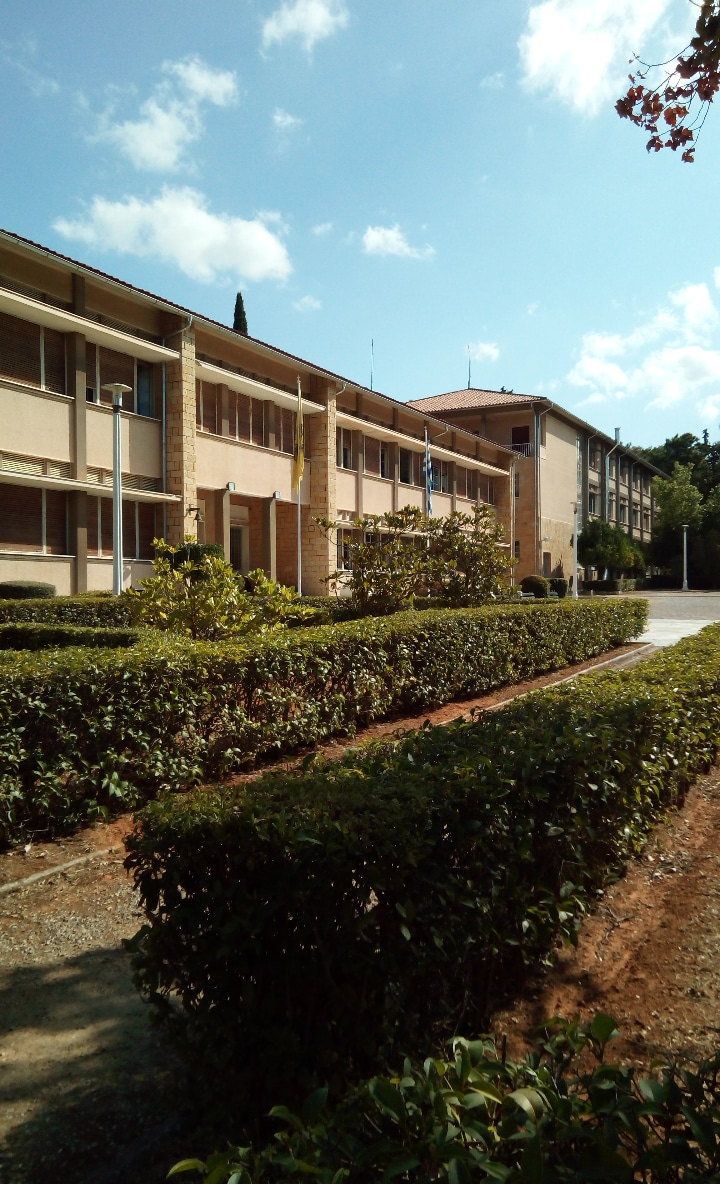
- The Rizareios Ecclesiastical School in Chalandri
- Athens (1844–1960); Chalandri (1960–present), Greece

Information
- Type: Public selective High School (present)
- Religious affiliation: Orthodox Christianity
- Established: 1841
- Founders: Manthos and Georgios Rizaris
- Principal: Nicholaos Giannis
- Website: rizarios.gr

Rizarios (or Rizareios) Ecclesiastical School of Athens (Greek: Ριζάρειος Εκκλησιαστική Σχολή Αθηνών ή Ριζάρειος Σχολή) is a Greek Orthodox historical educational institution founded at 1841, by Manthos and Georgios Rizaris, who was members of the Society of Friends (Filiki Eteria).

== Notable people and graduates ==
- Xenophon Zolotas
- Nectarios of Aegina
- Georgios Gennadios
- Neophytos Doukas
- Eleftherios Stavridis
- Theodore II of Alexandria
- Chrysostomos I of Athens
- Ieronymos I of Athens
- Archbishop Makarios of Australia
- Metropolitan Theophylactos of Australia
- Serafim Papakostas
- Stefan Ramniceanu
- Gregorios Papamichael
- Visarion Xhuvani
- Anastasios Tagis
- Theodoros Papagiannis
- Ioannis Theodorakopoulos
- Patroklos Karantinos
