= Manthos and Georgios Rizaris =

Greek benefactors, merchants and members of the organization Filiki Eteria

Manthos Rizaris (Greek: Μάνθος Ριζάρης, 1764–1824) and Georgios Rizaris (Greek: Γεώργιος Ριζάρης, 1769–1842) were Greek benefactors, merchants and members of the organization Filiki Eteria.

Rizari brothers were born in the village of Monodendri of Zagori region (Epirus). They lost both parents at an early age. Manthos Rizaris, the elder brother, moved to Moscow, in order to work in his uncle's trading business. At 1806 Georgios followed. They got involved in trade and made a fortune.

At 1817 Manthos became member of Filiki Eteria, and supported financially with huge amounts of money the Greek Revolution: a total donation of over 50.000 Russian rubles was offered for the Revolution's objectives. Manthos, died at 1824 in Moscow, Russian Empire.

Both brothers supported the independence of Greece . With their financial aid helped: the poor, the orphans, the ones that suffered because of the armed conflicts that took place during this period. After Manthos' death, Georgios moved to Odessa, and continued his business there. He found in his home place (Monodendri) the School of Greek Courses (Greek: Σχολή των Ελληνικών Μαθημάτων). Many orphans were awarded with full scholarships, including full coverage of their living costs.

At 1837 George Rizaris settled in Athens, his goal was to found a Religious Institution in the newly formed Greek state that would prepare educated priests. At 1843 after his death, the Hieratical school has started to function. In gratitude for their contribution, the school, was named: Rizarios Hieratical School. The school continues to function as a religious and educational institution today and it is based in Halandri, Athens.

Moreover, they have founded a number of schools in their home place Monodendri and in Epirus region. Their bequests continue to offer to Greek education and Greek Orthodox church.
