= Alibey, Silivri =

Alibey
- Neighbourhood
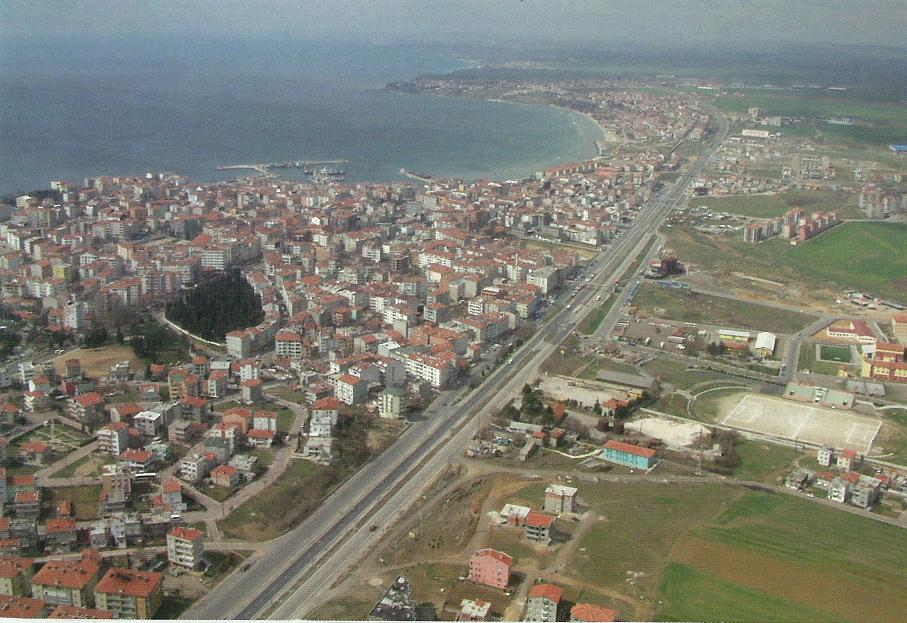
- Alibey neighborhood in the left bottom corner of the aerial image of Silivri

- Location within Turkey Location within Istanbul
- Coordinates: 41°04′22″N 28°15′16″E
- Country: Turkey
- Province: Istanbul
- District: Silivri
- Population (2022): 18,072
- Time zone: UTC+3 (TRT)
- Postal code: 34570
- Area code: 0212

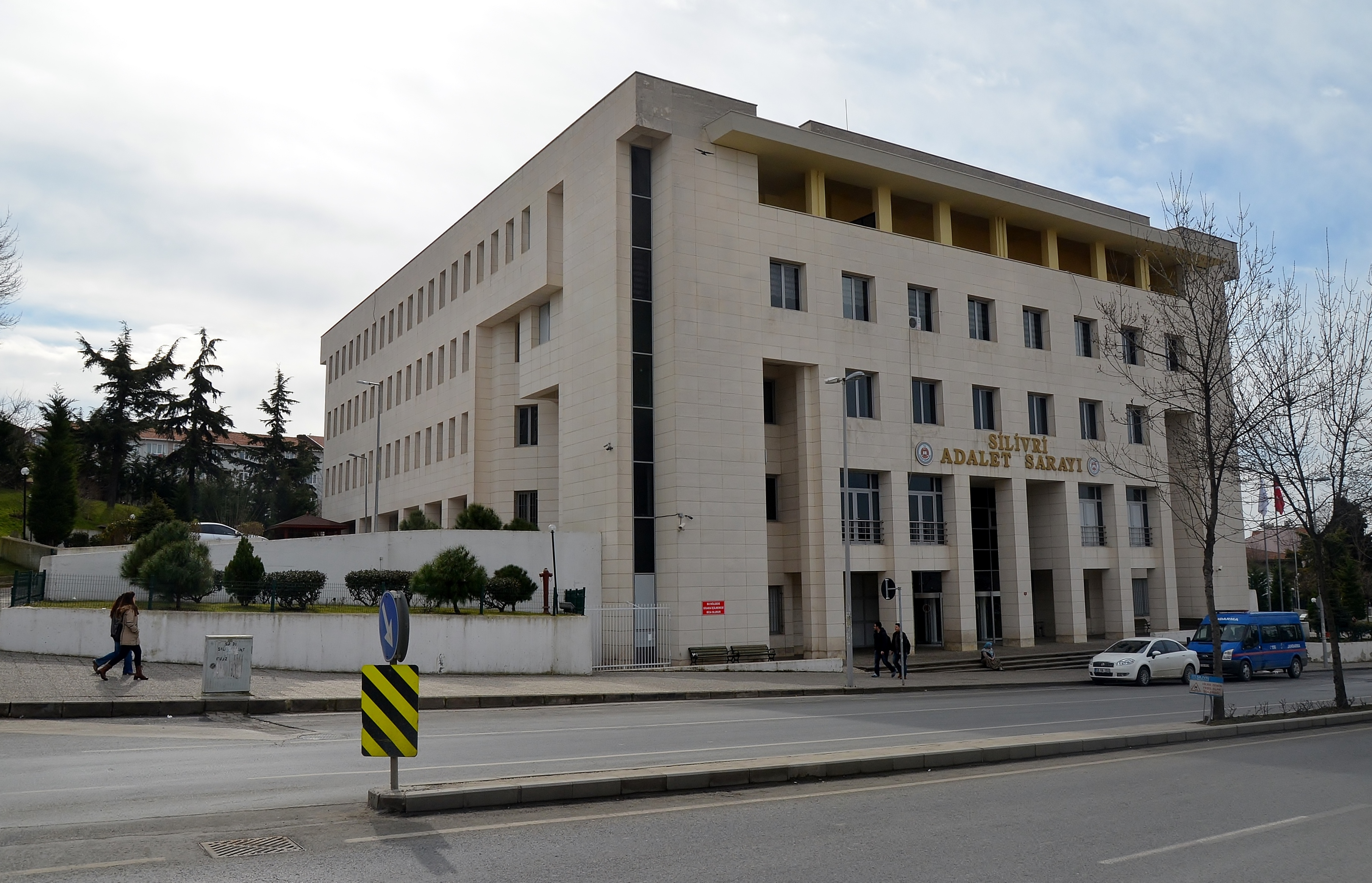
Silivri Court of Justice in ALibey.

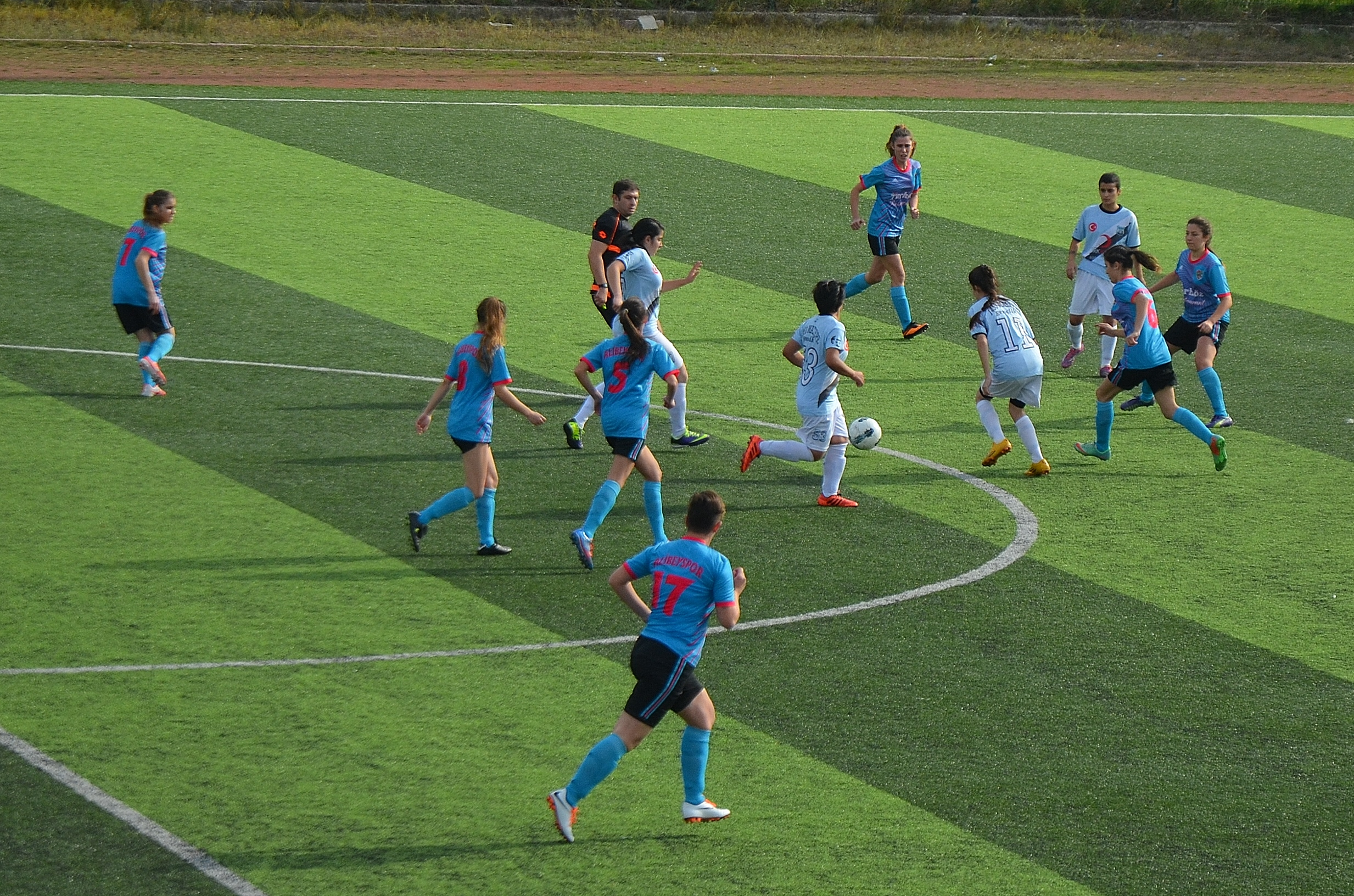
Alibeyspor (blue/black) playing against 1453 Maltepe Gençlik (white) in the home match of the 2015-16 Third League season.

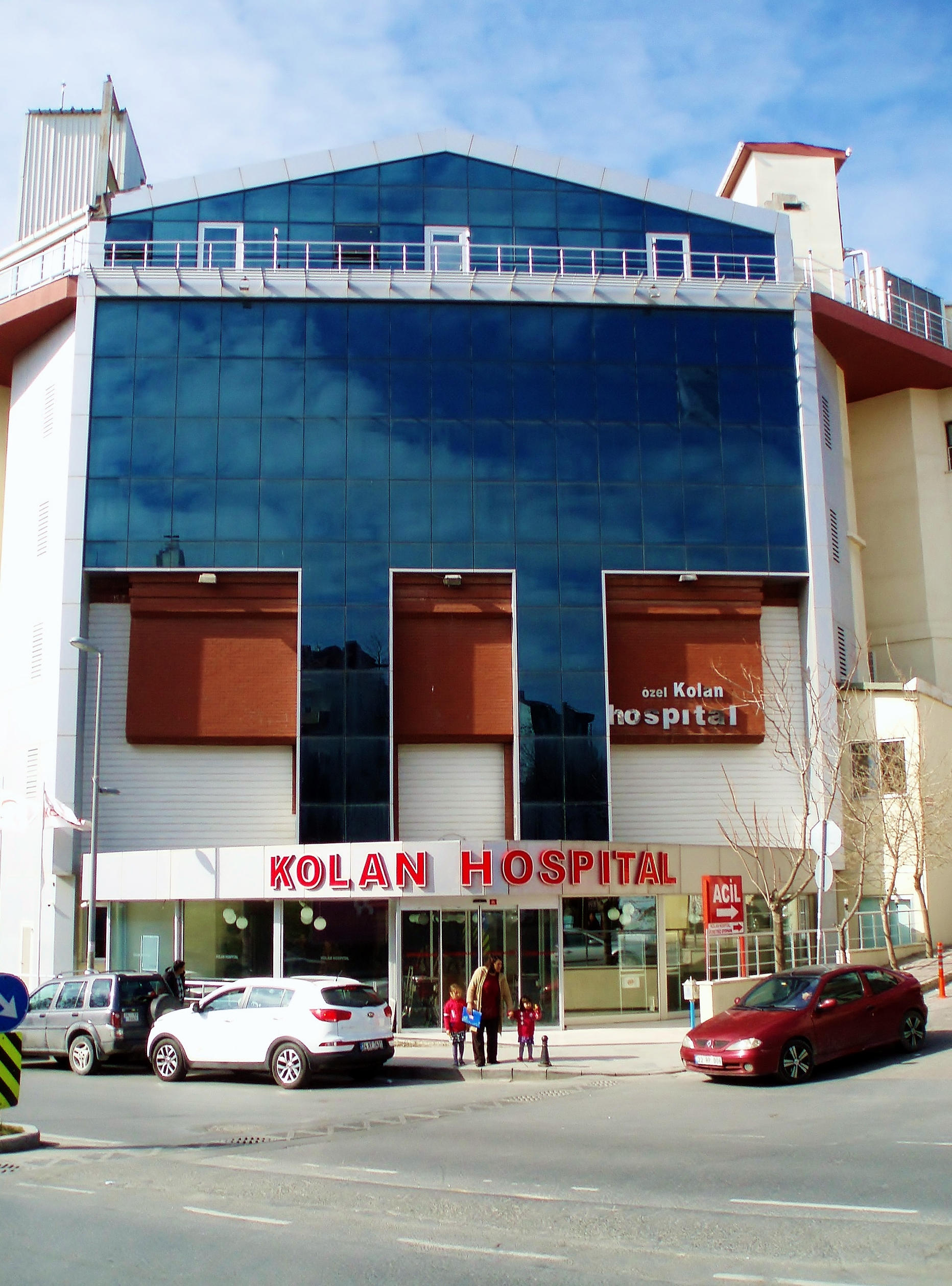
Kolan Hospital in Alibey, Silivri.

Alibey is a neighbourhood in the municipality and district of Silivri, Istanbul Province, Turkey. Its population is 18,072 (2022). It is situated southeast of the city center, bordered by the highway D-100 in the north.

The neighborhood takes its name from a no more existing Alibey Mosque. The historic mosque in Silivri was destroyed by the invading Bulgarian troops of the Principality of Bulgaria during the Russo-Turkish War (1877–1878).

Public buildings and places in Alibey are: the Silivri Municipality central service buildings (Turgut Özal Blvd.), the courthouse (Turgut Özal Blvd.), the headquarters of Silivri district Gendarmerie (Çetin St.), and the Silvri Cemetery (Akgün Silivri St.).

== Population ==
Historical population
Year	Pop.	±% p.a.
2007	15,626	—
2012	17,404	+2.18%
2017	18,122	+0.81%
2022	18,072	−0.06%
Source: TÜIK (2007-2022)

== Education ==
Six schools are located in Alibey, which are:

Public schools

- Piri Mehmet Paşa İlkokulu (Primary school)
- Gazi İmam Hatip Ortaokulu (Secondary İmam Hatip school)
- Silivri Ortaokulu (Secondary school)
- Silivri Anadolu Lisesi (Anatolian High School)

Private schools

- Özel Mektebim Koleji Silivri Fen Lisesi (Science high school)
- Özel Silivri Sınav Koleji Anadolu Lisesi (Anatolian High School)

== Sport ==
The women's football club Alibeyspor competes in the Turkish Women's Third League.

== Health care ==
The private hospital Silivri Özel Kolan Hastanesi (Turgut Özal Blvd.) is situated in ALibey.
