= Eleftherios Stavridis =

Greek journalist and politician

Eleftherios (Lefteris) Stavridis (Greek: Ελευθέριος (Λευτέρης) Σταυρίδης; 1893–1966) was a Greek journalist and politician. He was initially an activist of the Left, serving as General Secretary of the Communist Party of Greece in 1925–26, before being expelled from the Party in 1928 and undergoing a rapid ideological transition to the far right, becoming an ardent anti-communist. He participated in the fascist National Union of Greece, collaborated with the Metaxas dictatorship and the Germans during the Axis occupation of Greece, and served as a prominent anti-communist propagandist for successive right-wing governments after the Greek Civil War, until his death.

== Early life ==
Eleftherios Stavridis was born in the town of Silivri, near Constantinople, Ottoman Empire, in 1893. He became an orphan at a young age, and his uncle, Nektarios Karabounis (later sainted by the Eastern Orthodox Church) became his guardian.

He later went to Constantinople, where he went to school at the Great School of the Nation. After finishing school, he left the Ottoman Empire and went to Athens, where he studied at the Rizarios Ecclesiastical School of Athens, where his uncle was headmaster. Appointed as a clerk in the Ministry of the Interior, he was called up for military service in the mobilization of 1915, being sent to Drama, where he was cut off following the occupation of the area by the Bulgarian army in 1916. In 1917, along with the rest of the city's male population he was moved to a concentration camp in Pleven in Bulgaria, where he remained until the capitulation of Bulgaria at the end of World War I. On his return to Greece, he was appointed to the Eastern Macedonia Directorate at Drama.

== Membership of the Communist Party ==
Stavridis became an early member of the Socialist Labour Party of Greece (SEKE), the predecessor of the later Communist Party of Greece (KKE), joining its Drama branch soon after the party's foundation. In the 2nd Congress of SEKE in April 1920, he participated as representative of the Drama organization. In 1921 he was again called up for military service and sent to the front in the Asia Minor Campaign. Along with Pantelis Pouliopoulos and Giorgos Nikolis, he was an active propagandist among the troops of SEKE's uncompromising opposition to the Asia Minor Campaign. After the Greek defeat and retreat from Asia Minor, he returned to Athens and became an editor in the party newspaper, Rizospastis. With many of the leading figures in the party under arrest, Stavridis quickly rose to become a member of SEKE's leading circle.

In September 1923, in SEKE's 2nd Extraordinary Congress, he was elected a member of the party's Central Committee. In the 3rd Extraordinary Congress in December 1924, he was re-elected to the Central Committee, and along with Pouliopoulos played a leading role in the party's renaming as the "Communist Party of Greece" and its full adoption of the Russian Bolshevik model, together with the expulsion of most of the original founding members of the party.

In September 1925 Stavridis was elected as provisional Secretary of the Central Committee, replacing Pouliopoulos, who had been arrested by the dictatorial regime of Theodoros Pangalos. During Pangalos' overthrow by Georgios Kondylis and the re-establishment of democratic rule in 1926, Stavridis suggested a co-operation with the bourgeois political parties, but the other members of the leadership rejected his proposal and remained steadfast adherents of the party's commitment to revolutionary struggle. In September 1926, he was replaced as Secretary by Pastias Giatsopoulos. In the November 1926 election, Stavridis was elected as a Member of Parliament for KKE in Kavala. Two years later, however, he was expelled from the party due to "pro-bourgeois deviation".

== Shift to the right and anti-communist activism ==
Stavridis was to prove the accusations of "pro-bourgeois deviation" right by immediately joining Georgios Kafantaris' Progressive Party, and by his rapid turn to ardent anti-communism; indeed, this volte-face cause him to be publicly beat up in Kavala, where he had been elected MP. Over the next few years Stavridis remained a member of Kafantaris' party and a close collaborator of Kafantaris himself, but at the same time he was actively involved in the foundation of a far-right and pro-fascist group, the National Union of Greece (EEE). Stavridis later collaborated with the dictatorial 4th of August Regime of Ioannis Metaxas, and during the Axis occupation of Greece served as director of the Akropolis newspaper.

In 1946, Stavridis went to Thessaloniki, where his only child, a daughter, was born. With the outbreak of the Greek Civil War later in the year he returned to Athens, where he lived in hiding in a hospital until the end of the war in 1949. In that year he returned to Thessaloniki, where he wrote for the local newspapers Makedonia and Ellinikos Vorras. In the virulently anti-communist climate of the post-Civil War years, Stavridis soon became a major government-sponsored propagandist against the banned KKE and communism in general. In 1952 he was named director of the Thessaloniki Radio Station, and in 1953 he returned to Athens as advisor to the Chief of the Hellenic Army General Staff, Lt. General Solon Gikas, and as instructor on ideology and the history of the KKE in the National Defence Academy, the War School and the Hellenic Gendarmerie Academy.

From 1958 until 1964, under the National Radical Union governments of Konstantinos Karamanlis, Stavridis was appointed advisor to the Ministry of the Presidency of the Government. During this time he participated in the establishment of a clandestine anti-communist committee, which was funded by the government and aimed at combating the United Democratic Left, the KKE's legal front which in the 1958 elections had come second and formed the main opposition party. The journalist and likewise former KKE member Georgios Georgalas, and the future leader of the Regime of the Colonels, Georgios Papadopoulos, were also members of the group.

Dismissed from his post as adviser by the Centre Union governments, in 1966 he was recalled to the post by the Stefanos Stefanopoulos government, but died on 14 May 1966, before assuming duties.
