= Carbon Mapper =

Methane monitoring satellite initiative

- Formation: 2021
- Type: Nonprofit organization
- Purpose: Detection and monitoring of greenhouse gas emissions
- Headquarters: United States
- Region served: Global
- Website: https://carbonmapper.org/

Carbon Mapper is a nonprofit environmental monitoring initiative that develops and operates remote sensing systems to detect and quantify greenhouse gas emissions, particularly methane and carbon dioxide, at facility scale. The initiative integrates satellite, airborne, and data analysis technologies to identify high-emission sources.

The initiative operates through a public–private partnership involving scientific institutions, nonprofit organisations, and technology companies. Participating partners include NASA's Jet Propulsion Laboratory, Planet Labs, and academic institutions.

== History ==
The Carbon Mapper Coalition was formed in 2021 as a collaboration among research institutions, environmental organisations, and technology companies to improve detection of high-emission greenhouse gas sources.

Early projects involved airborne remote sensing campaigns and integration of satellite-based instruments to map methane emissions from industrial facilities, oil and gas infrastructure, and waste sites.

The initiative later expanded to include a constellation of hyperspectral satellites designed to detect methane plumes from individual facilities worldwide.

== Monitoring system ==
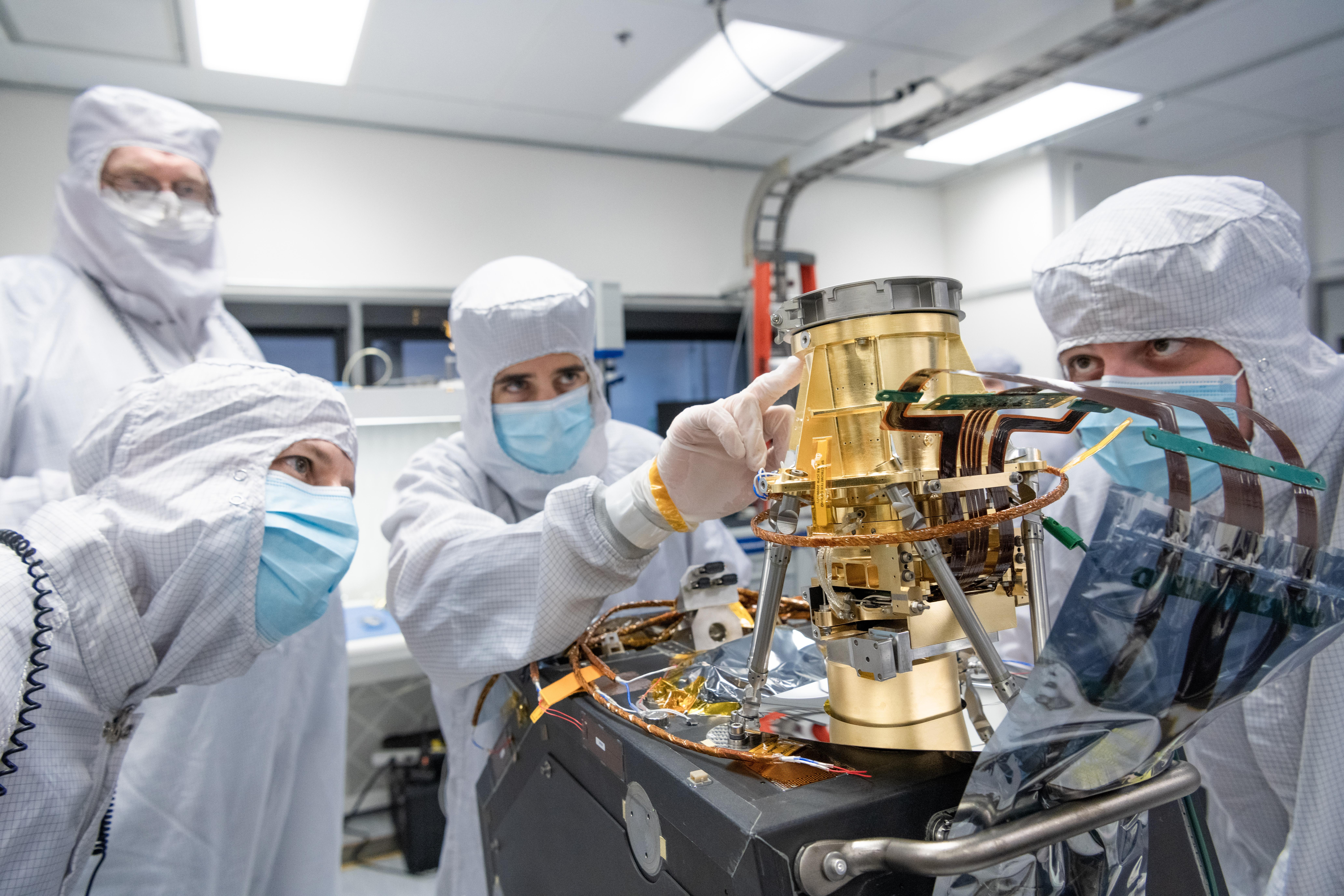
Engineers inspecting the Carbon Mapper imaging spectrometer at NASA's Jet Propulsion Laboratory, 2023.

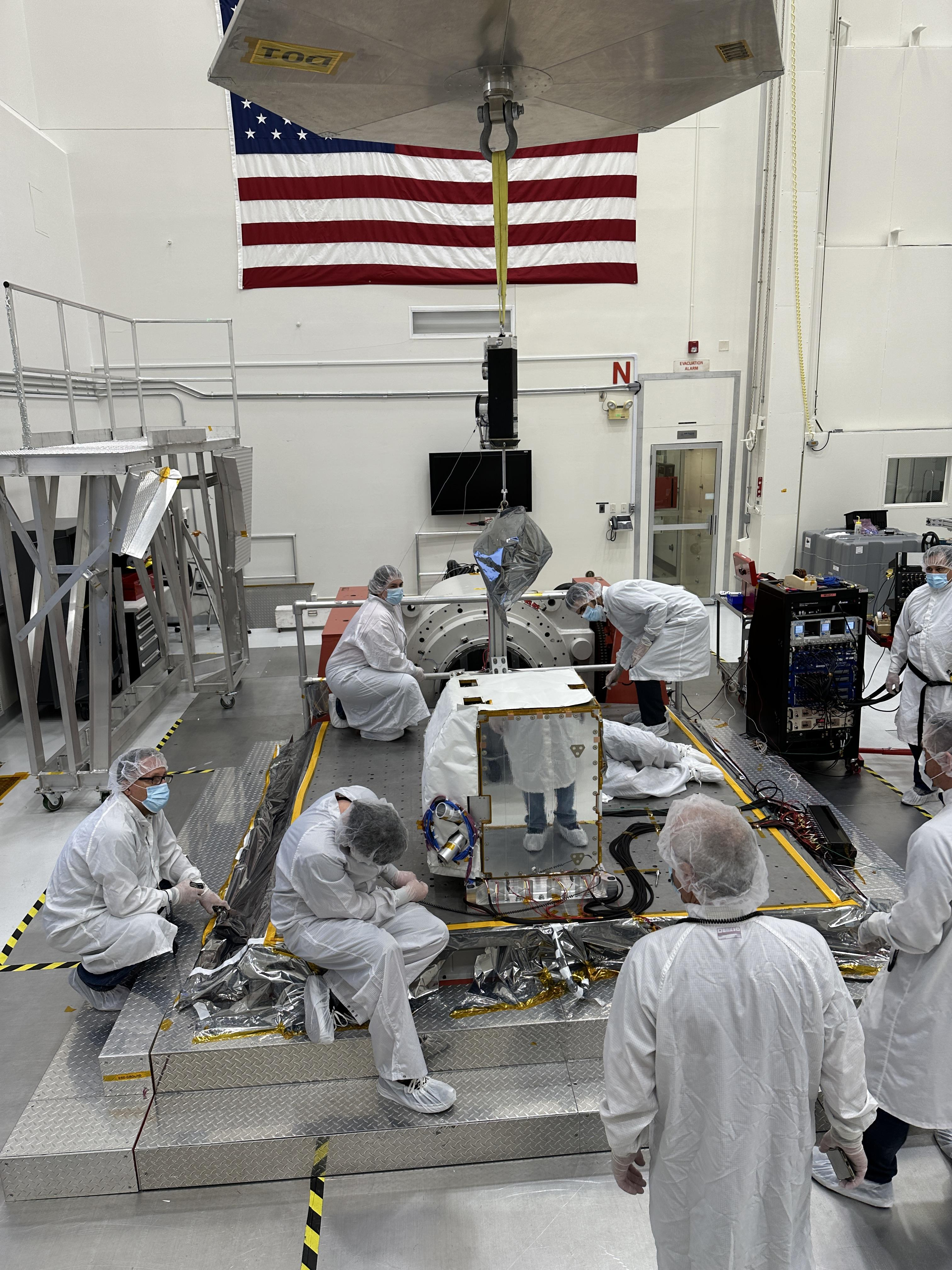
Vibration testing of the Carbon Mapper imaging spectrometer at NASA's Jet Propulsion Laboratory, 2023.

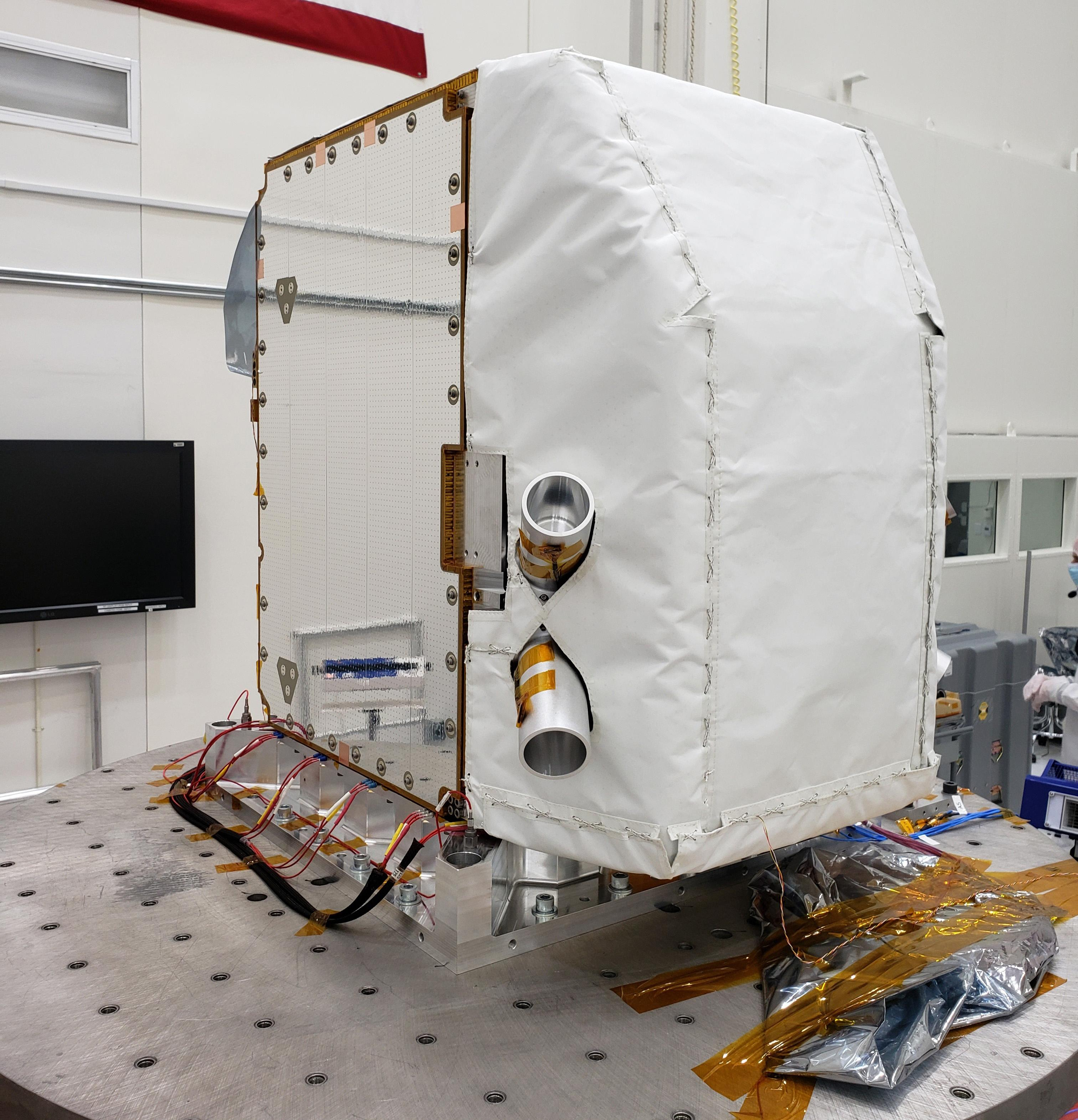
Fully integrated Carbon Mapper imaging spectrometer at NASA's Jet Propulsion Laboratory prior to shipment for satellite integration, 2023.

Carbon Mapper operates an integrated emissions monitoring system combining satellite instruments, aircraft sensors, and data analysis infrastructure.

The system is designed to locate and quantify methane and carbon dioxide emissions at facility scale across multiple regions of the world.

== Satellite programme ==
The Carbon Mapper satellite programme includes a constellation of hyperspectral imaging satellites designed to detect methane plumes from space with high spatial resolution.

The first satellite in the constellation, Tanager-1, was launched in 2024 aboard a Falcon 9 rocket from Vandenberg Space Force Base.

== Research and applications ==
Carbon Mapper data have been used in studies of methane emissions from industrial and waste-sector sources.

The monitoring approach forms part of broader global efforts to improve transparency and accountability in greenhouse gas emissions tracking.

== See also ==
- Methane emissions
- Earth observation satellite
- Remote sensing
- Greenhouse gas monitoring
