= Müjdat Gürsu =

Turkish footballer

Personal information
- Full name: Müjdat Gürsu
- Date of birth: 13 September 1971
- Place of birth: Silivri, Istanbul, Turkey
- Date of death: 21 June 1994 (aged 22)
- Place of death: Antalya, Turkey
- Position: Midfielder

Youth career
- 1988–90: Silivrispor

Senior career*
Years	Team	Apps	(Gls)
1990–91	Silivrispor	34	(0)
1991–92	Bandırmaspor	32	(2)
1992–94	Samsunspor	55	(3)

International career
1992–94	Turkey U21	9	(2)
- * Club domestic league appearances and goals

Müjdat Gürsu (13 September 1971 – 21 June 1994) was a Turkish footballer. He played for Samsunspor.

== Biography ==
Gürsu was born on 13 September 1971 in Silivri, Istanbul. He started his professional career with Samsunspor during the 1992-93 season, and won the Turkish Second League (now Turkish Bank Asya First League) in his first year with the club. In his second season, they finished Turkish Super League 5th and won Balkan Cup with his team-mates Cenk İşler, Ahmet Yıldırım, Ertuğrul Sağlam and Daniel Timofte.

He played as Ronald Koeman and his nickname was Koeman Müjdat.

He played for Turkey U21 alongside Rüştü Reçber, Alpay Özalan, Arif Erdem, Ergün Penbe, Hakan Şükür, Sergen Yalçın, Abdullah Ercan and Emre Aşık.

He died in a traffic accident in Antalya. His nephew Müjdat Gürsu (had same name with him) also died in another traffic accident in 2009

== Honours ==
- 1993 Turkish Second League Champion Samsunspor
- 1994 Balkan Cup Champion with Samsunspor
