= Euryphon =

Greek physician

Euryphon (Greek: Εὐρυφῶν) was a celebrated ancient Greek physician of Cnidos in Caria, who was probably born in the first half of the 5th century BC, as Soranus says that he was a contemporary of Hippocrates, but older. Soranus also says that he and Hippocrates were summoned to the court of Perdiccas II of Macedon, but this story is considered very doubtful, if not altogether apocryphal. He is mentioned in a corrupt fragment by the comic poet Plato, preserved by Galen. He is several times quoted by Galen, who says that he was considered to be the author of the ancient medical work entitled Κνίδιαι γνῶμσι, and also that some people attributed to him several works included in the Hippocratic Corpus.

From a passage in Caelius Aurelianus it appears that Euryphron was aware of the difference between arteries and veins, and also considered that the former vessels contained blood. Of his works, nothing is now extant except a few fragments, unless he is the author of the treatises in the Hippocratic collection that have been attributed to him.
