= Francis Hervé =

British artist and travel writer (1781–1850)

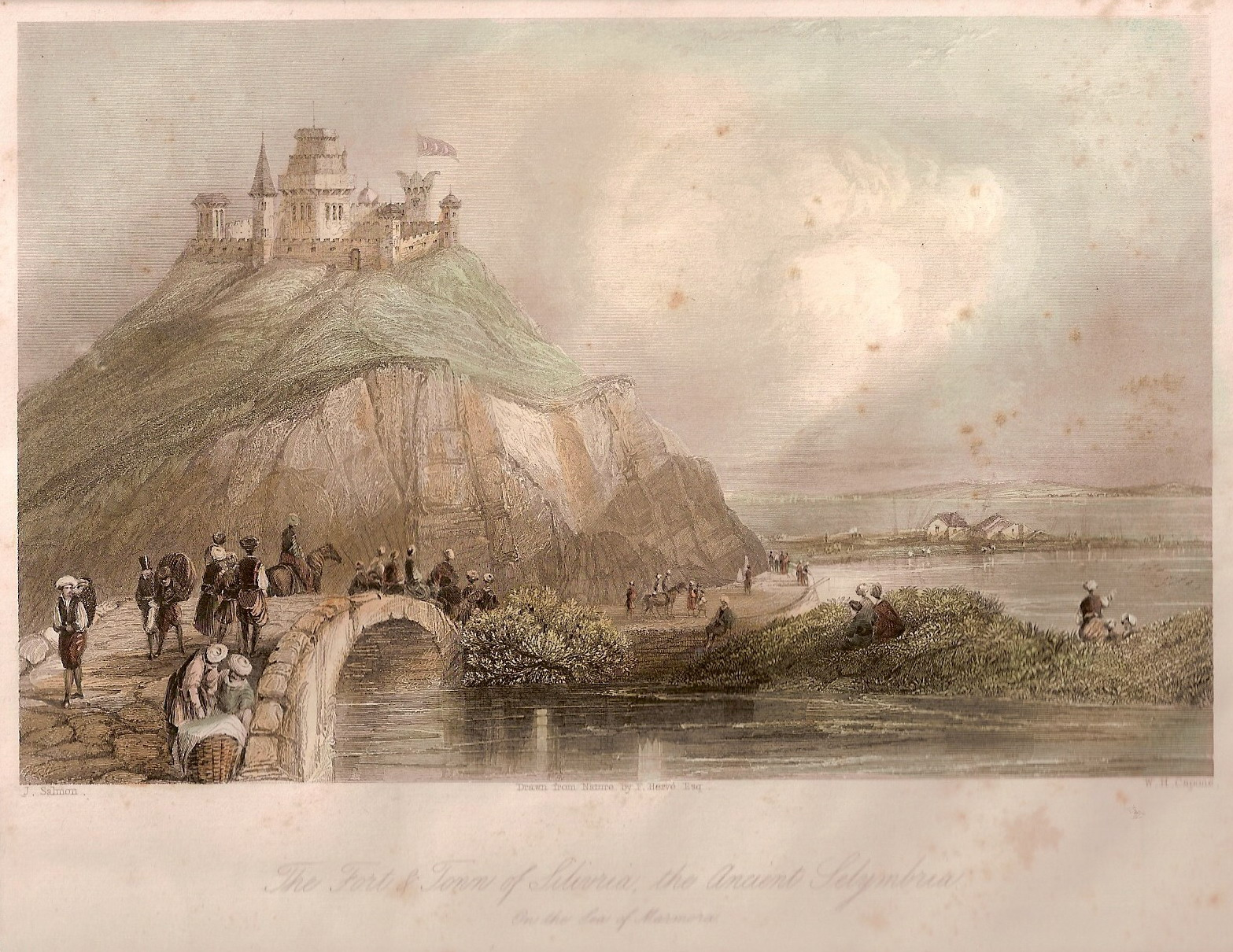
The fort and town of Silivria, the ancient Selymbria, on the Sea of Marmara - Drawn from nature by F. Hervé, Esq. (About 1832) Courtesy of Gürhan Altan, Istanbul

Francis Hervé (1781–1850) was a French born British artist and travel writer.

He traveled in the Levant in about 1833. Hervé was commissioned by philhellene British General Richard Church to produce a series of portraits of the leaders of the Greek War of Independence. He wrote his impressions about his journey through Hungary, Balkans, Turkey and Greece in a book with lithographed scenes and portraits drawn by himself.

He was a close friend of Madame Tussaud. Her two sons published a book on their mother’s life and career in collaboration with Francis Hervé.

== Bibliography ==
- A residence in Greece and Turkey, with notes of the journey through Bulgaria, Servia, Hungary and the Balkan. Two volumes, 412 p. London, Whittaker & Co., (1837)
- Madame Tussaud Memoirs and Reminiscences of the French Revolution ed. Francis Hervé, Esq., (1838), Two volumes. Lea and Blanchard, Philadelphia.
- How to Enjoy Paris in 1842, a Companion and Monitor (1842), (English)
