= Kryovrysi, Ioannina =

Kryovrysi Κρυόβρυση
- Community
- Location within Greece
- Coordinates: 39°42′N 20°57′E
- Country: Greece
- Administrative region: Epirus
- Regional unit: Ioannina
- Municipality: Ioannina
- Municipal unit: Perama

Population (2021)
  - Community: 49
- Time zone: UTC+2 (EET)
  - Summer (DST): UTC+3 (EEST)

Kryovrysi (Greek: Κρυόβρυση, meaning cold spring) is a village located in the municipal unit of Perama, Ioannina regional unit, Greece. It is situated in the southeastern part of the Mitsikeli mountains, at the southeast edge of the Zagori region. Kryovrysi is 2.5 km north of Spothoi, 9 km east of Perama and 8 km northeast of Ioannina.

== Population ==
Historical population
Year	Pop.	±%
1981	172	—
1991	102	−40.7%
2001	151	+48.0%
2011	63	−58.3%
2021	49	−22.2%

== History ==
In the area, a section of the ancient Via Egnatia that ran from Mazia to Baldouma has been preserved. The chapel of Agioi Anargyroi and the bridge near the locality of Kamper-Aga date back to Ottoman rule.

== See also ==
- List of settlements in the Ioannina regional unit
