= Mitsikeli =

Mountain range in Greece

- Μιτσικέλι
- Location within Greece

Highest point
- Elevation: 1,810 m (5,940 ft)
- Listing: List of mountains in Greece
- Coordinates: 39°42′47″N 20°54′22″E

Naming
- Pronunciation: Greek: [mitsiˈceli]

Geography
- Location: Ioannina regional unit, Greece

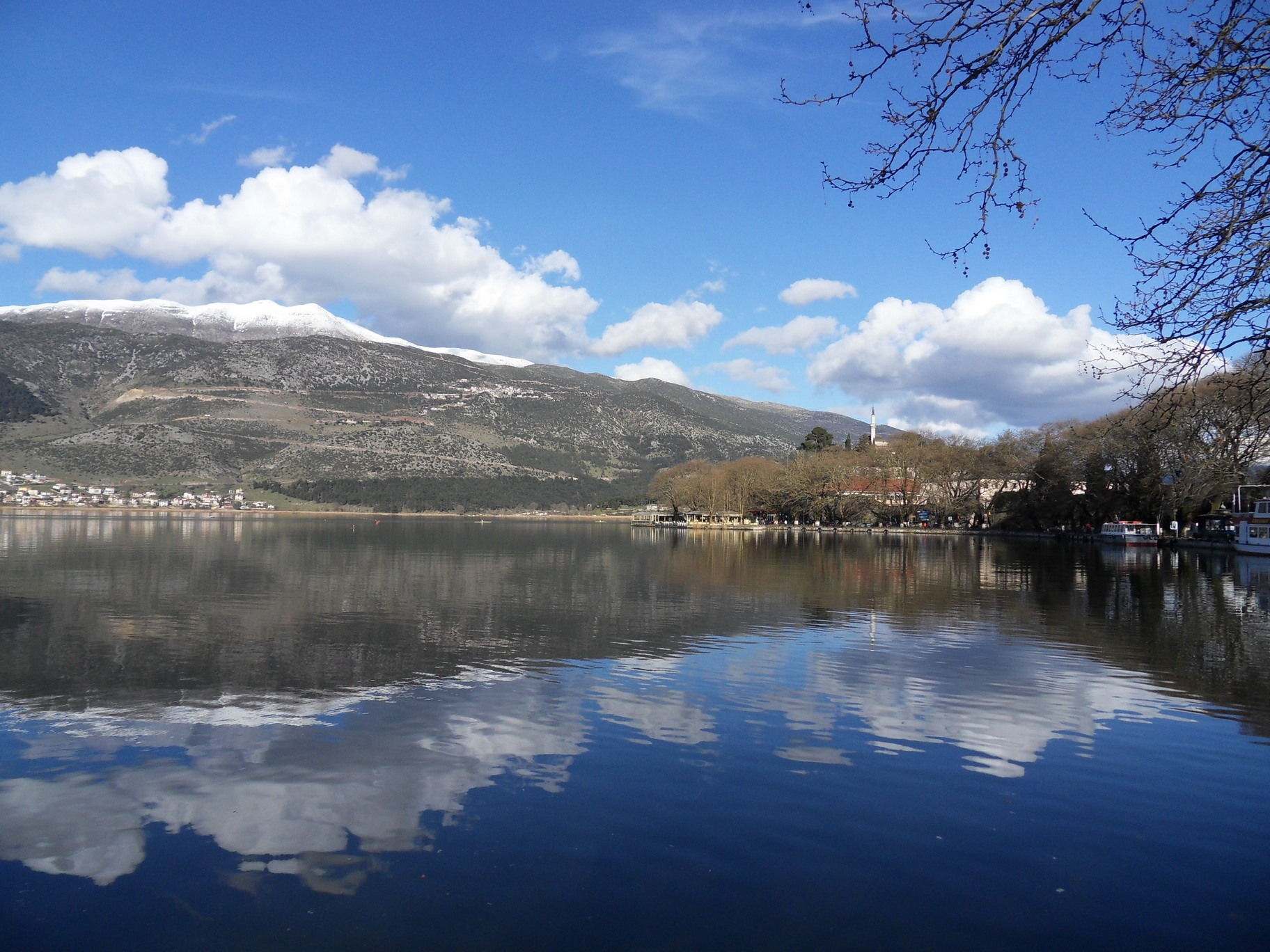
Mitsikeli and the Lake of Ioannina

Mitsikeli (Greek: Μιτσικέλι) is a mountain range in the central part of the Pindus mountains, in Epirus, Greece. The mountain is located northeast of Ioannina and Lake Ioannina. Its highest elevation is 1,810 m (5,940 ft). It stretches from near Kalpaki in the northwest to the eastern end of Lake Ioannina, a total length of 35 km (22 mi). The northeastern slopes and the lower northwestern part of Mitsikeli are forested. The nearest mountains are the Tymfi to the north, the Lygkos to the northeast and the Lakmos to the east. It is drained by tributaries of the Thyamis to the northwest, towards Lake Ioannina to the southwest, by the Voidomatis (tributary of the Aoos) to the northeast and by the Arachthos to the southeast.

Mitsikeli forms the southwestern border of the Zagori region. Villages in the mountains include Kato Pedina and Asprangeloi in the northwest, Dikorfo and Perivleptos in the central part, and Kryovrysi in the southeast. The Greek National Road 6 (Larissa - Trikala - Ioannina - Igoumenitsa) passes south of the mountain, the Greek National Road 20 (Kozani - Konitsa - Ioannina) is to the west. The famous Perama Cave is to the southwest. There is a telecommunications tower on the summit.
