= Lake Pamvotida =

Lake in Epirus, Greece

Pamvotida Lake
- Λίμνη Παμβώτιδα (Greek)
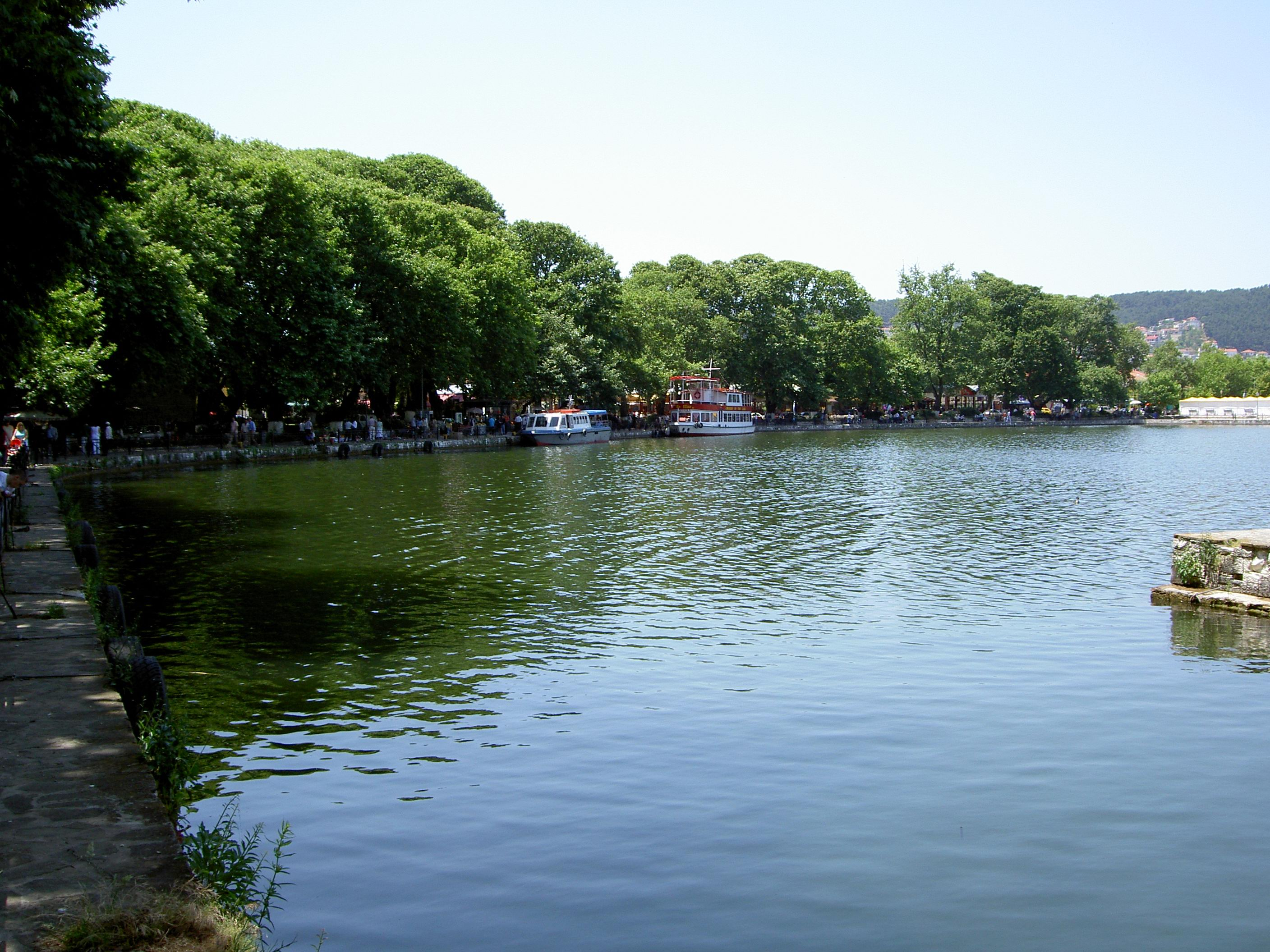
- The ferry dock in Molos

- Location within Greece
- Location: Epirus, Greece
- Coordinates: 39°39′45″N 20°53′06″E
- Primary outflows: no surface outflow
- Basin countries: Greece
- Max. length: 7.9 km (4.9 mi)
- Max. width: 5.4 km (3.4 mi)
- Surface area: 19.4 km^{2} (7.5 sq mi)
- Average depth: 4.5 m (15 ft)
- Max. depth: 11 m (36 ft)
- Surface elevation: 470 m (1,540 ft)
- Islands: 1
- Settlements: Ioannina and Perama

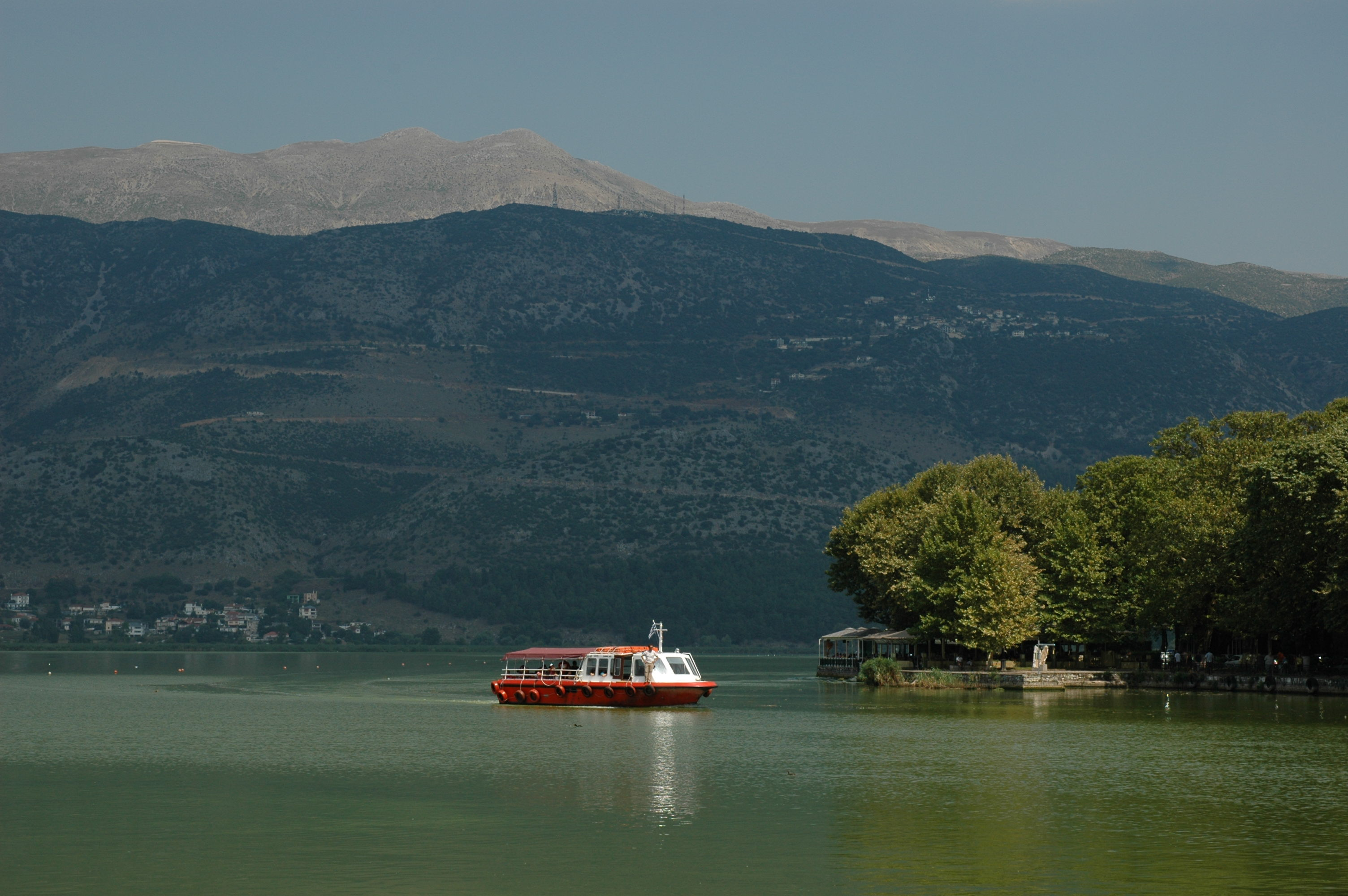
A ferry on Lake Pamvotida, returning from the island

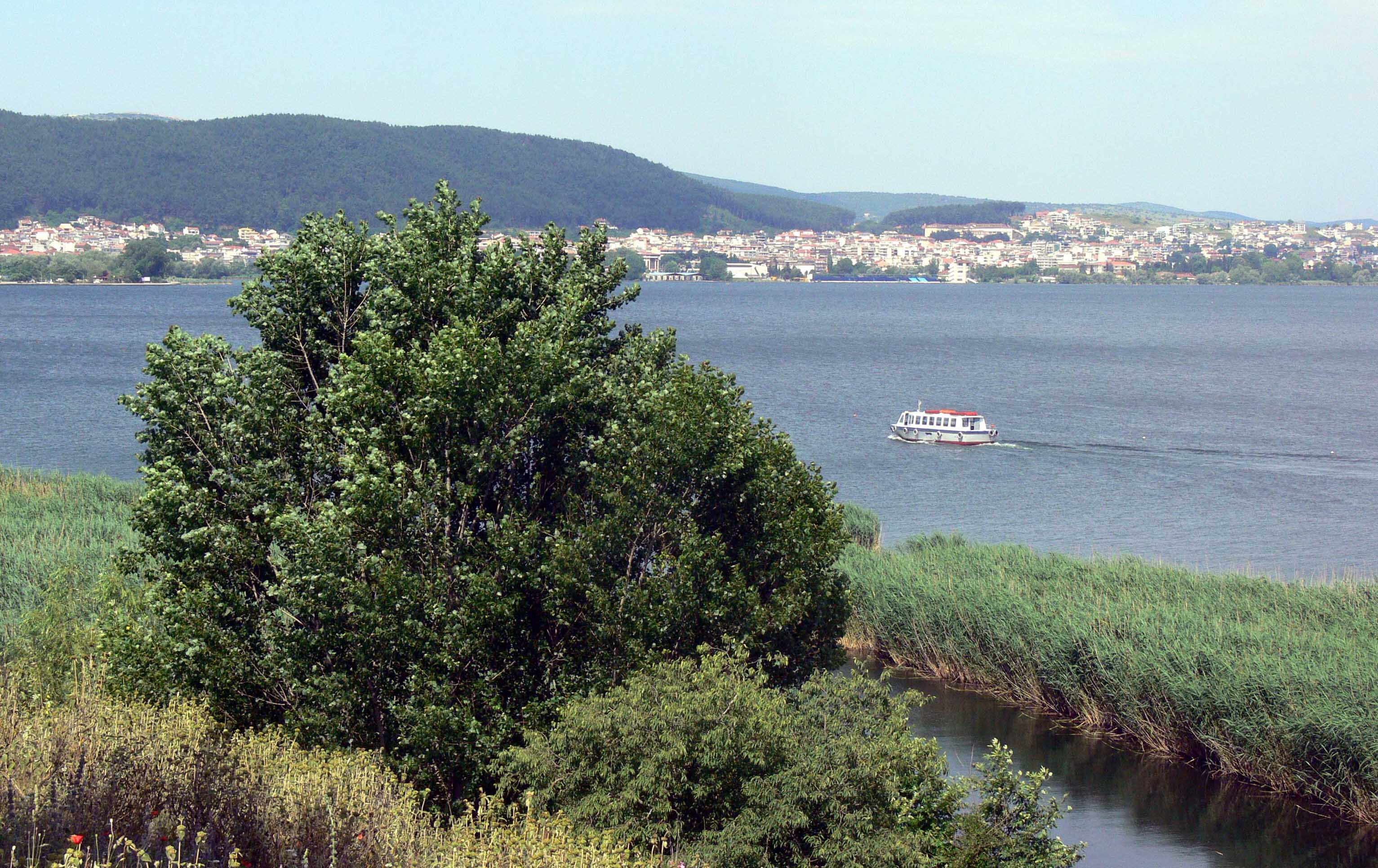
Lake Pamvotida

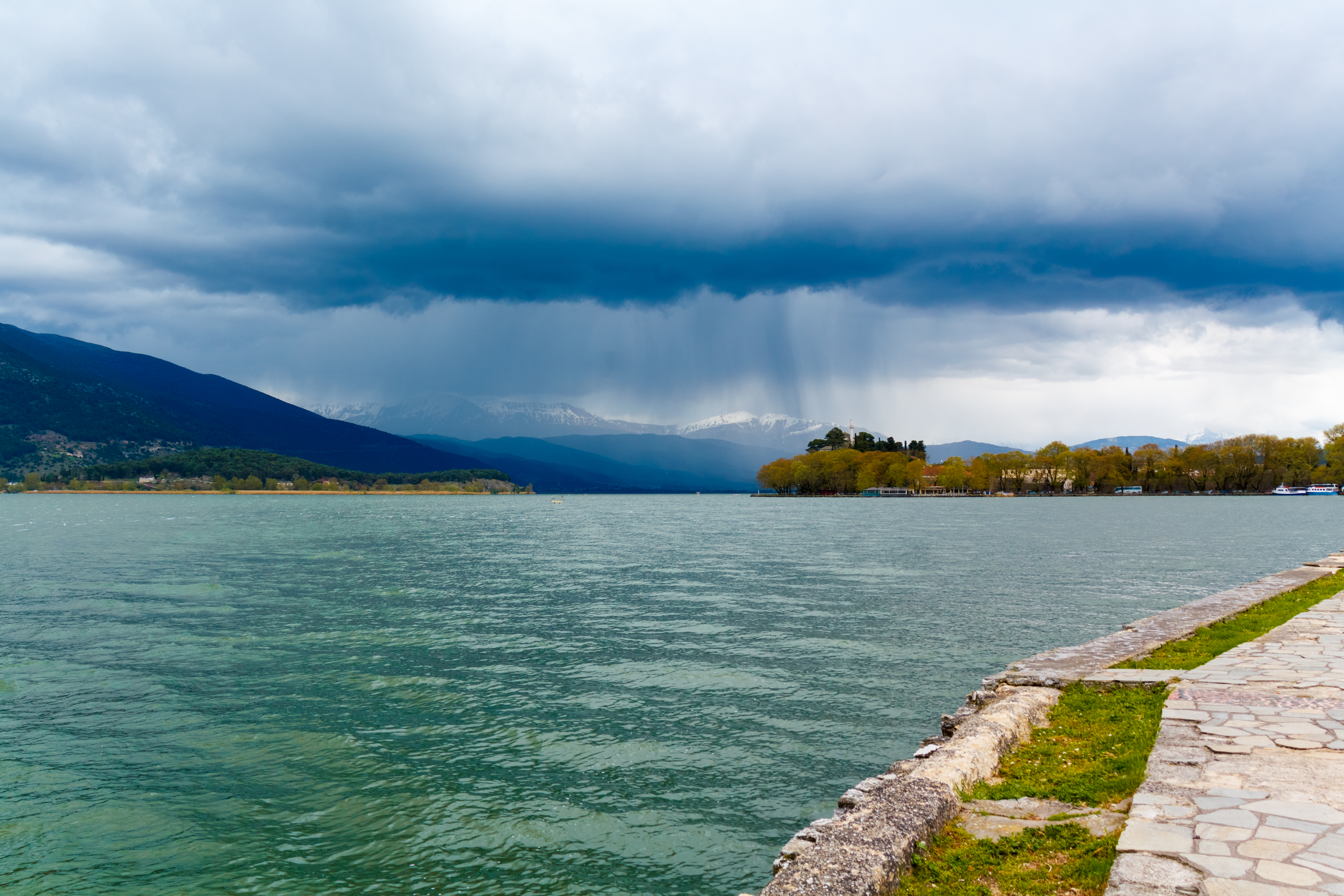
Lake Pamvotida

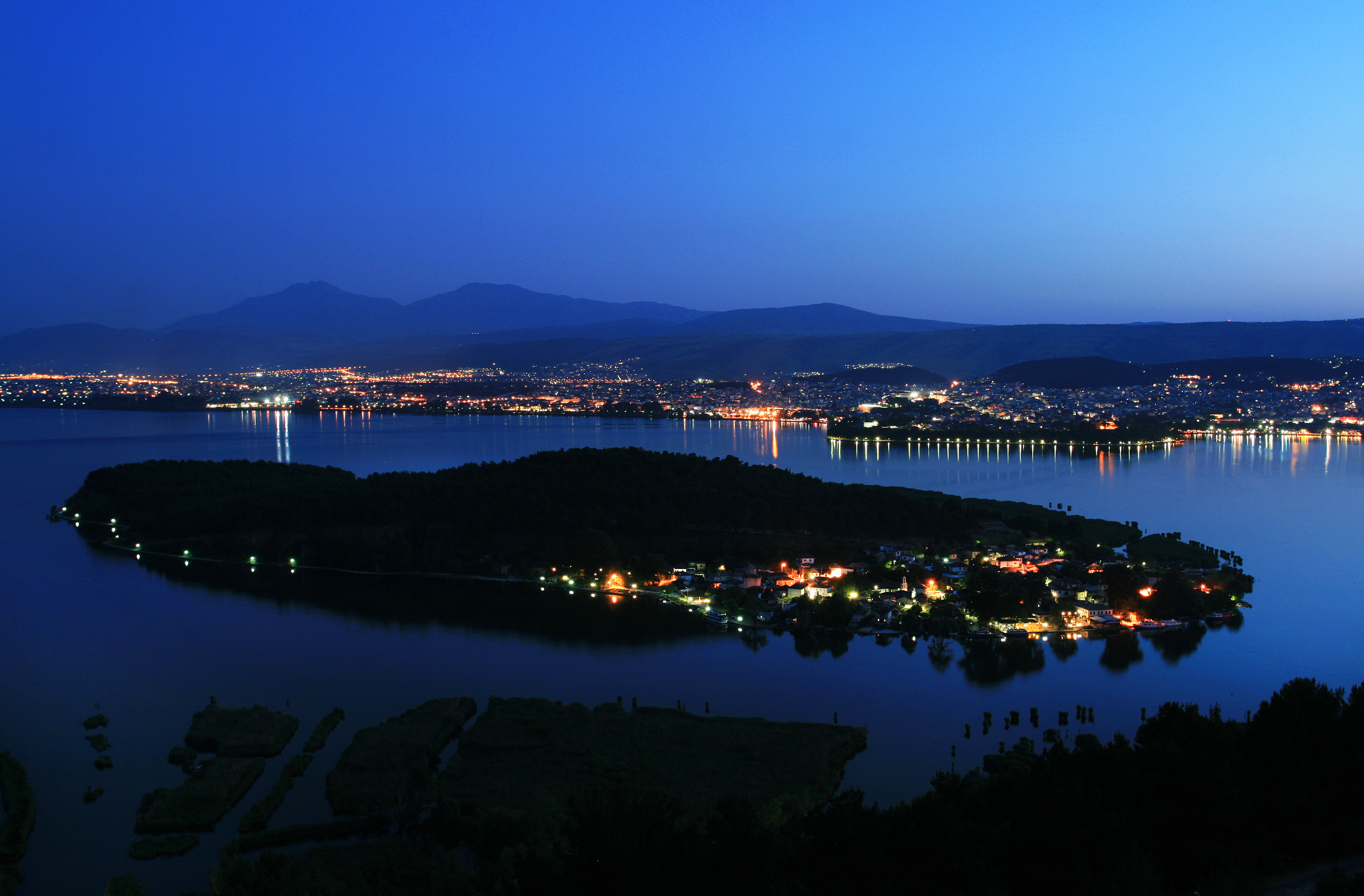
Night view of lake Pamvotida with its island

Lake Pamvotida or Pamvotis (Greek: Λίμνη Παμβώτιδα/Παμβώτις), also known as the Lake of Ioannina (Greek: Λίμνη των Ιωαννίνων, Limni ton Ioanninon), is the largest lake in Epirus, located in the central part of the Ioannina regional unit in northern Greece. The regional capital Ioannina to the west and the town of Perama to the north are urban settlements fringing the lake while the remaining of its periphery is composed of farmland. The lake features small fishing ports and a boating port. There is a regular boat service to the Ioannina Island, which is inhabited and located within the lake. The Greek National Road 6 surrounds the northern half of the lake.

== Geography ==
Lake Pamvotida is situated at 470 m elevation, south of the Mitsikeli mountains. It is fed by several small rivers. It has no surface outflow, but it is drained through karstic sinkholes towards the rivers Arachthos, Louros and Kalamas. In 1960 a tunnel and ditch were constructed that drain from the northern end of the lake to the river Kalamas. The small inhabited Ioannina Island, where Ali Pasha was hiding during the last days of his reign, is situated near the northern shore.

== Biology ==
Urbanisation and pollution are threatening the lake ecosystem, home to small mammals, waterbirds and a rich fish and crustacean fauna. Eutrophication results in algal blooms in summer. Lake Pamvotida is home to Tsima (Τσίμα), a species of fish endemic to the lake. Two bryozoan species have recently been reported from the lake.

== Pollution ==
The State General Laboratory and the Department of Hygiene and Epidemiology, University of Ioannina, Ioannina Region notified the results of analysis of samples from Lake Pamvotis in order to ascertain the reasons that led to the death of a host of fish. As revealed by the results, the lake is impaired by pollutants from sewage, which significantly exceed permissible limits. According to what was said by the Head of State General Laboratory Department of Ioannina Anastasios Tsongas, the effluent is the same quality as those that led to biological treatment, with the difference being that these were channeled directly to the lake.

== See also ==
- List of lakes in Greece
- Kyra Frosini, who was famously executed by drowning in the lake, alongside 16 other women, for adultery on the order of the Ottoman governor, Ali Pasha of Ioannina

== Literature ==
- Franz X. Bogner & Georg Pilidis: Lake of Ioannina - Limni Pamvotis. Ioannina, 2010, ISBN 978-960-233-199-6 (bilingual book).
