= Frankokratia =

Period of Greek history following the Fourth Crusade (1204)

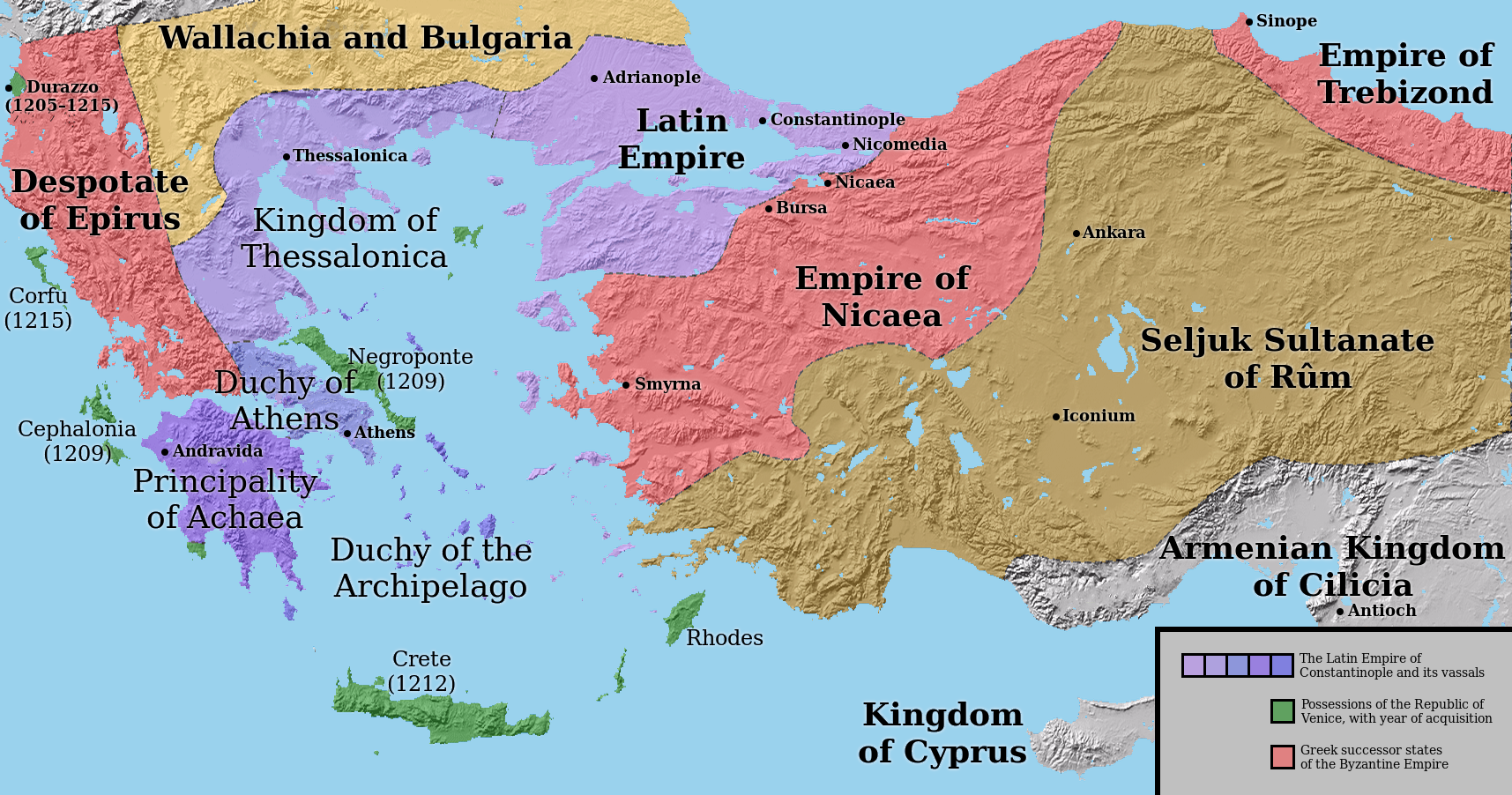
The beginning of Frankokratia: the division of the Byzantine Empire after the Fourth Crusade

Greek and Latin states in southern Greece, c. 1210

The Eastern Mediterranean c. 1450 AD, showing the Ottoman Empire, the surviving Byzantine Empire (purple) and the various Latin possessions in Greece

The Frankish Occupation, also known as the Latin Occupation (Λατινοκρατία, Latinokratía) and, for the Venetian domains, Venetian Occupation, were the collection of primarily French and Italian states, fiefs and colonies that were established by the Partitio terrarum imperii Romaniae on the territory of the partitioned Byzantine Empire following the Sack of Constantinople of 1204 during the Fourth Crusade.

The terms Frankokratia and Latinokratia derive from the name "Franks", given by the Orthodox Greeks to the Western French and Italians who originated from territories that once belonged to the Frankish Empire, the political entity that ruled much of the former Western Roman Empire after the collapse of Roman authority and power. The span of the Frankokratia period differs by region: the political situation proved highly volatile, as the Frankish states fragmented and changed hands, and the Greek successor states re-conquered many areas.

While the Byzantine Empire itself was restored in 1261, many Greek areas nonetheless remained under the control of "Franks", especially of Venetians, as late as the Ottoman conquest. They were gradually captured by the Ottomans in the 14th to 17th centuries. The Ionian Islands and some islands or forts remained in Venetian hands until the turn of the 19th century.

== Latin states ==
=== Latin Empire ===
The Latin Empire (1204–1261), centered in Constantinople and encompassing Thrace and Bithynia, was created as the successor of the Byzantine Empire after the Fourth Crusade, while also exercising nominal suzerainty over the other Crusader principalities. Its territories were gradually reduced to little more than the capital, which was eventually captured by the Empire of Nicaea under the rule of Michael VIII Palaiologos in 1261. The Latin States comprised:

- The Kingdom of Thessalonica (1205–1224), encompassing Macedonia and Thessaly. The brief existence of the Kingdom was almost continuously troubled by warfare with the Second Bulgarian Empire; eventually, it was conquered by the Despotate of Epirus.
- The Principality of Achaea (1205–1432), encompassing the Morea or Peloponnese peninsula. It quickly emerged as the strongest state and prospered even after the demise of the Latin Empire. Its main rival was the Byzantine Despotate of the Morea, which eventually succeeded in conquering the Principality. It also exercised suzerainty over the Lordship of Argos and Nauplia (1205–1388), and most of the other Latin states. In the 1380s, it fell under the control of Navarrese Company and they ended their vassalage to the Angevin kings of Naples in 1404.
- The Duchy of Athens (1205–1458), with its two capitals, Thebes and Athens, encompassing Attica, Boeotia, and parts of southern Thessaly. In 1311, the Duchy was conquered by the Catalan Company and became part of the Crown of Aragon. In 1388, it passed into the hands of the Florentine Acciaiuoli family, which kept it until the Ottoman conquest in 1456.
- The Duchy of the Archipelago (1207–1579), founded by the Sanudo family, it encompassed most of the Cyclades. In 1383, it passed under the control of the Crispo family. In 1418, Naxos became officially a vassal of Venice. The Duchy became an Ottoman vassal in 1537 and was finally annexed to the Ottoman Empire in 1579.
- The Duchy of Philippopolis (1204 – after 1230), a fief of the Latin Empire in northern Thrace, until its capture by the Bulgarians.
- The Marquisate of Bodonitsa (1204–1414), like Salona, was originally created as a vassal state of the Kingdom of Thessalonica but later came under the influence of Achaea. In 1335, the Venetian Giorgi family took control and ruled until the Ottoman conquest in 1414.
- The County of Salona (1205–1410), centred at Salona (modern Amfissa), like Bodonitsa, was formed as a vassal state of the Kingdom of Thessalonica and later came under the influence of Achaea. It came under Catalan (thus became part of the Aragonese realm) and later Navarrese rule in the 14th century, before being sold to the Knights Hospitaller in 1403. It was finally conquered by the Ottomans in 1410.
- The Triarchy of Negroponte (1205–1470), encompassing the island of Negroponte (Euboea), originally a vassal of Thessalonica, and then of Achaea. It was fragmented into three baronies (terzi or "triarchies") run each by two barons (the sestieri). This fragmentation enabled Venice to gain influence by acting as mediators. By 1390, Venice had established direct control of the entire island, which remained in Venetian hands until 1470, when it was captured by the Ottomans.
- Lemnos (1207-1278), a fief of the Latin Empire, under the Venetian Navigajoso family, from 1207 until conquered by the Byzantines in 1278. Its rulers bore the title of megadux ("grand duke") of the Latin Empire.
- The Kingdom of Albania (1271–1383), established after the fall of Constantinople but ruled by the Capetian House of Anjou. Latin Emperor Philip II held both titles from 1313 to 1331. It was ruled by Karl Thopia, a relative of the Angevins, of the Principality of Albania from the 1360s to 1380s. It became part of Venetian Albania in 1392, after the death of Karl's son Gjergj Thopia.

=== Minor Crusader principalities ===
- The County Palatine of Cephalonia and Zakynthos (1185–1479). It encompassed the Ionian Islands of Cephalonia, Zakynthos, Ithaca, and, from around 1300, Lefkas (Santa Maura). Created as a vassal to the Kingdom of Sicily, it was ruled by the Orsini family from 1195 to 1335 and, after a short interlude of Anjou rule, was passed to the Tocco family in 1357. The county was split between Venice and the Ottomans in 1479.
- The Duchy of Neopatras (1319–1393), centered around Ypati, created as part of the Kingdom of Sicily and Crown of Aragon in 1319. Captured by the Acciaioli family in 1390 and by the Ottomans soon after.
- Rhodes became the headquarters of the military monastic order of the Knights Hospitaller of Saint John in 1310, and the Knights retained control of the island (and neighbouring islands of the Dodecanese island group) until ousted by the Ottomans in 1522.

=== Genoese colonies ===
Genoese attempts to occupy Corfu and Crete in the aftermath of the Fourth Crusade were thwarted by the Venetians. It was only during the 14th century, exploiting the terminal decline of the Byzantine Empire under the Palaiologos dynasty, and often in agreement with the weakened Byzantine rulers, that various Genoese nobles established domains in the northeastern Aegean:

- The Gattilusi family established a number of fiefs, under nominal Byzantine suzerainty, over the island of Lesbos (1355–1462) and later the islands of Lemnos, Thasos (1414–1462) and Samothrace (1355–1457), as well as the Thracian town of Ainos (1376–1456).
- The Lordship of Chios with the port of Phocaea. From 1304–1330 it was ruled by the Zaccaria family, and, after a Byzantine interlude, from 1346 until the Ottoman conquest in 1566, by the Maona di Chio e di Focea company.

=== Venetian colonies ===
The Republic of Venice accumulated several possessions in Greece, which formed part of its Stato da Màr. Some of them survived until the fall of the Republic itself in 1797:

- Kingdom of Candia (1211–1715). Crete was one of the Republic's most important overseas possessions and was retained until captured by the Ottomans in the Cretan War.
- Corfu (1207–1214 and 1386–1797), was captured by Venice from its Genoese ruler shortly after the Fourth Crusade. The island was soon retaken by the Despotate of Epirus but captured in 1258 by the Kingdom of Sicily. The island remained under Angevin rule until 1386, when Venice reimposed its control, which would last until the end of the Republic itself.
- Durazzo (1205–1213), captured by the Despotate of Epirus in 1213. The city later became part of the Angevin Kingdom of Albania until it was captured by Karl Thopia and became part of the Principality of Albania. He was succeeded by his son Gjergj Thopia, who allied himself to the Venetians, and Durazzo officially fell under Venetian control once again after Thopia'sath 1392.
- Lefkas (1684–1797), originally part of the Palatine county and the Orsini-ruled Despotate of Epirus, it came under Ottoman rule in 1479, and was conquered by the Venetians in 1684, during the Morean War.
- Zakynthos (1479–1797), originally part of the Palatine county and the Orsini-ruled Despotate of Epirus, fell to Venice in 1479
- Cephalonia and Ithaca (1500–1797), originally part of the Palatine county and the Orsini-ruled Despotate of Epirus, came under Ottoman rule in 1479 and were conquered by the Venetians in December 1500.
- Tinos and Mykonos, bequeathed to Venice in 1390.
- Various coastal fortresses in the Peloponnese and mainland Greece:
  - Modon (Methoni) and Coron (Koroni), occupied in 1207, confirmed by the Treaty of Sapienza, and held until taken by the Ottomans in August 1500.
  - Nauplia (Italian: Napoli di Romania), acquired through the purchase of the lordship of Argos and Nauplia in 1388, held until captured by the Ottomans in 1540.
  - Argos, acquired through the purchase of the lordship of Argos and Nauplia but seized by the Despotate of the Morea and not handed over to Venice until June 1394, who held it until it was captured by the Ottomans in 1462.
  - Athens, acquired in 1394 from the heirs of Nerio I Acciaioli, but lost to the latter's bastard son Antonio in 1402–03, a fact recognized by the Republic in a treaty in 1405.
  - Parga, port town on the coast of Epirus, acquired in 1401. It was governed as a dependency of Corfu, and remained so even after the end of the Venetian Republic in 1797, finally being ceded by the British to Ali Pasha in 1819.
  - Lepanto (Naupaktos), a port in Aetolia, briefly seized by a Venetian captain in 1390. In 1394, its inhabitants offered to hand it over to Venice, but were rebuffed. It was sold to Venice in 1407 by its Albanian ruler, Paul Spata, and lost to the Ottomans in 1540.
  - Patras, leased, from 1408–13 and 1417–19, for 1,000 ducats per year, from the Latin Archbishop of Patras, who hoped to thwart a Turkish or Byzantine takeover of the city.
  - The Northern Sporades (Skiathos, Skopelos, and Alonissos), Byzantine possessions that came under Venetian rule after the Fall of Constantinople in 1453. They were captured by the Ottomans under Hayreddin Barbarossa in 1538.
  - Monemvasia (Malvasia), a Byzantine outpost left unconquered by the Ottomans in 1460. It accepted Venetian rule, until it was captured by the Ottomans in 1540.
  - Vonitsa, on the coast of Epirus, captured in 1684 and held as a mainland exclave of the Ionian Islands until the end of the Republic.
  - Preveza, on the coast of Epirus, occupied during the Morean War (1684–99), recaptured in 1717 and held as a mainland exclave of the Ionian Islands until the end of the Republic.
- The entirety of the Peloponnese, or Morea peninsula, was conquered during the Morean War in the 1680s and became a colony as the "Kingdom of the Morea". It was reconquered by the Ottomans in 1715.

== Linguistic influence ==
The fragmentation of the Byzantine Empire caused communication problems and gradually led to the division of koiné into dialects. The prestige of the literary language also declined, because the Franks used the language of the common people for administration purposes in the conquered areas. Latin loanwords flooded the language, mostly Italian, including dialects such as Venetian. Next in frequency were French words, followed by a very small number of words from Provençal, Catalan, Spanish and others. The vocabulary of feudal law and property ownership was mainly French, while the vocabulary of trade and shipping was Italian.

Linguistic interaction between Greeks and Franks appear in toponyms and, to a limited extent, in personal names. Frankish place names in Greece constitute the most significant linguistic influence exerted by the Franks. For example, the Greek: Μπελβεντέρε, romanized: belventere, lit. 'belvedere' (from Italian bel 'beautiful') was equivalent to the Greek: Καλλιθέα, romanized: Kallithea, lit. 'beautiful view' or Greek: Καλοσκόπι, romanized: Kaloskopi, lit. 'good view', and the Greek: Μαλεβίζι, romanized: malevizi which became the name Malvezino, likely came from Old French mauvais 'bad'. Furthermore, the names Ανέζα (Agnes), Αμαλία (Amalie), Φλόρα (Flora), Μαργαρίτα (Margheritte), Λοΐζος (Loys) and Στίνης (Estienne, Étienne) are of Frankish origin. Also, words with Frankish origin entered the Greek lexicon, such as Medieval Greek: αμαντίζω, romanized: amantizo, lit. 'repair', from Old French amendrer 'repair', equivalent to Greek: βελτιώνω, romanized: beltiono, lit. 'improve'; Medieval Greek: ασεντζίζω, romanized: asentzizo, lit. 'besiege', from Old French assegier 'besiege', equivalent to Greek: πολιορκώ, romanized: poliorko, lit. 'besiege'; Medieval Greek: ρόι, romanized: roi and ρήγας, regas, both meaning 'king', from Old French roi 'king', equivalent to Medieval Greek: βασιλιάς, romanized: basilias, lit. 'king'; and Medieval Greek: ροΐνα, romanized: roina and ρήγαινα, regaina, both meaning queen, from Old French reïne 'queen'.

Many Latin words, mainly military terms and terms of feudal law, took root in the Greek language, after phonetic changes and semantic specializations. These include Medieval Greek: φουσσάτο, romanized: foussato, lit. 'army; camp', from Latin fossatum castrum 'moated castle' and Medieval Greek: πρίγκηπας, romanized: prigkepas, lit. 'prince', from Latin princeps 'chief'. Latin can also be traced in given names, such as Ιερώνυμος (Hieronymus), Βαλεντίνος (Valentinos), Γάσπαρης (Gasparis), Γερώνυμος (Geronymus), Λοΐζος (Loizus), Μπατής (Batis), Πασχάλης (Paschalis) and Φενδερίκος (Fenderikos).

== Gallery ==
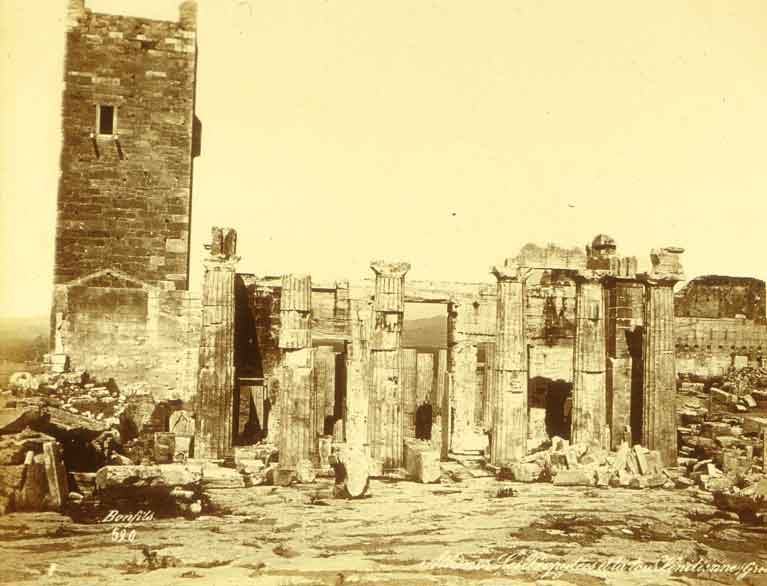
The Frankish tower on the Acropolis of Athens, demolished in 1874

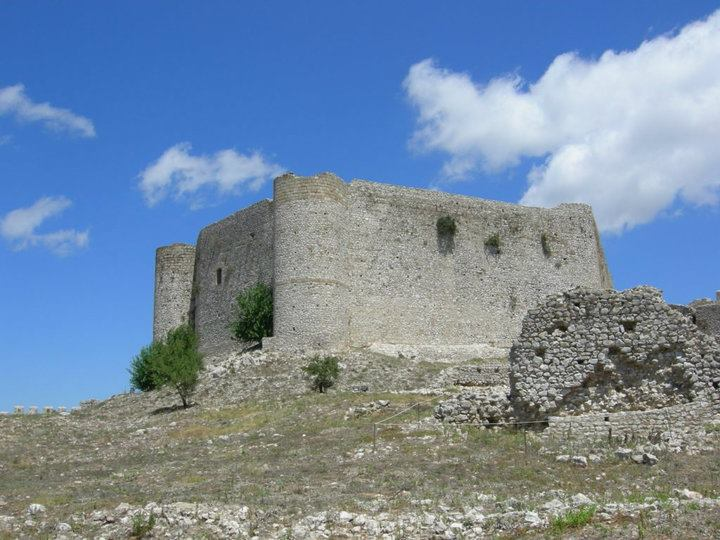
Chlemoutsi castle

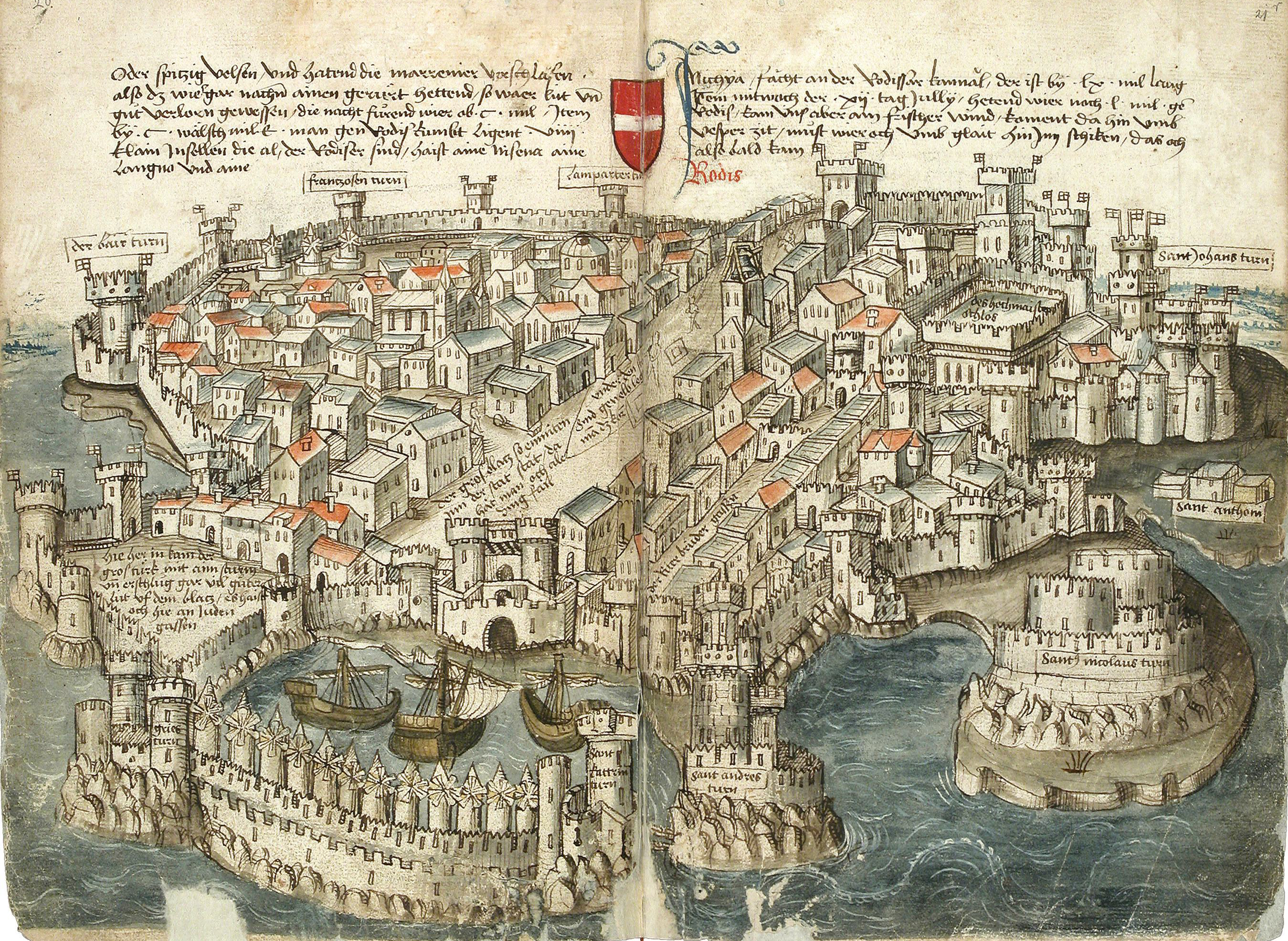
Rhodes (city), around 1490

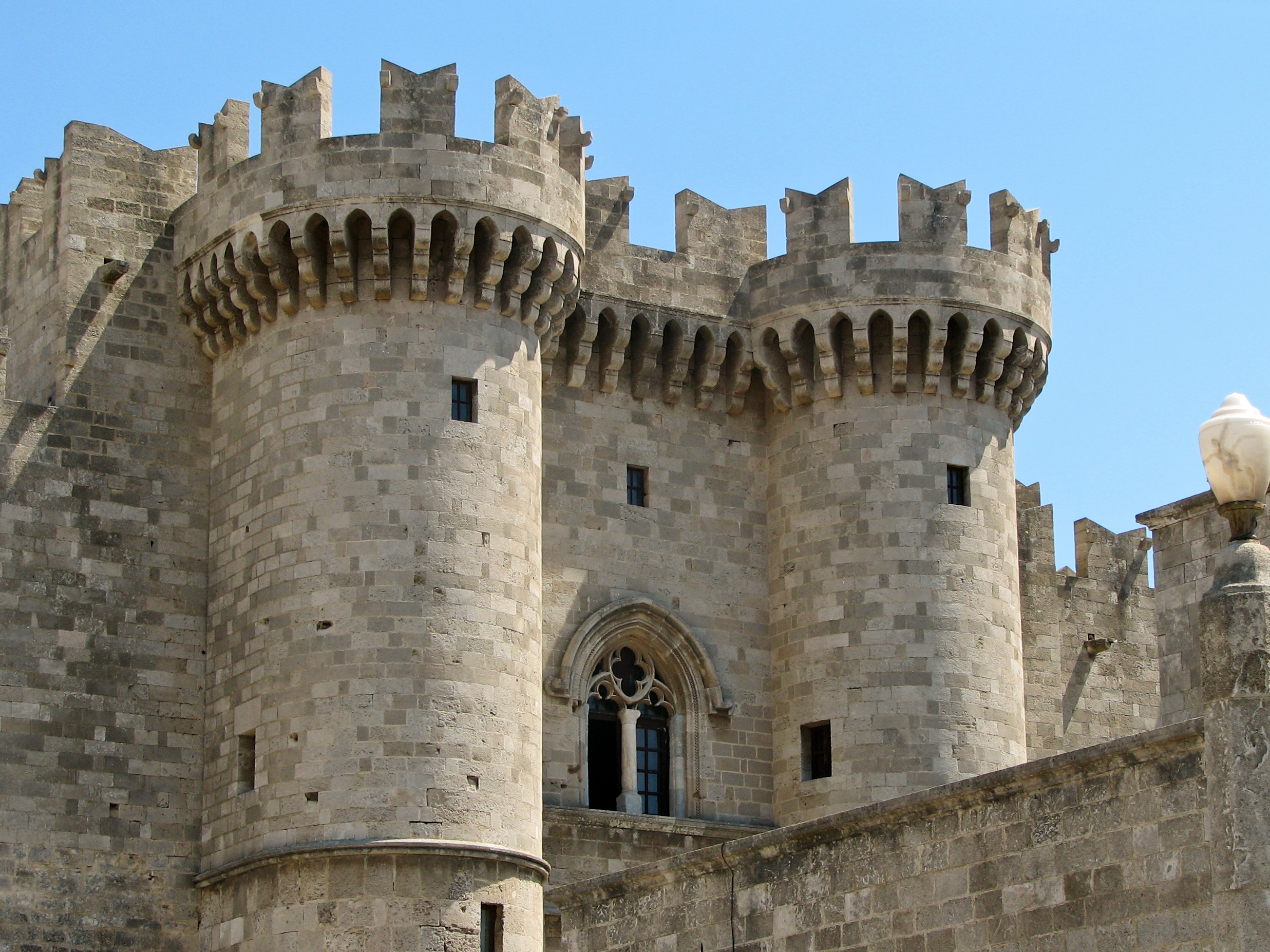
Palace of the Grand Master of the Knights of Rhodes

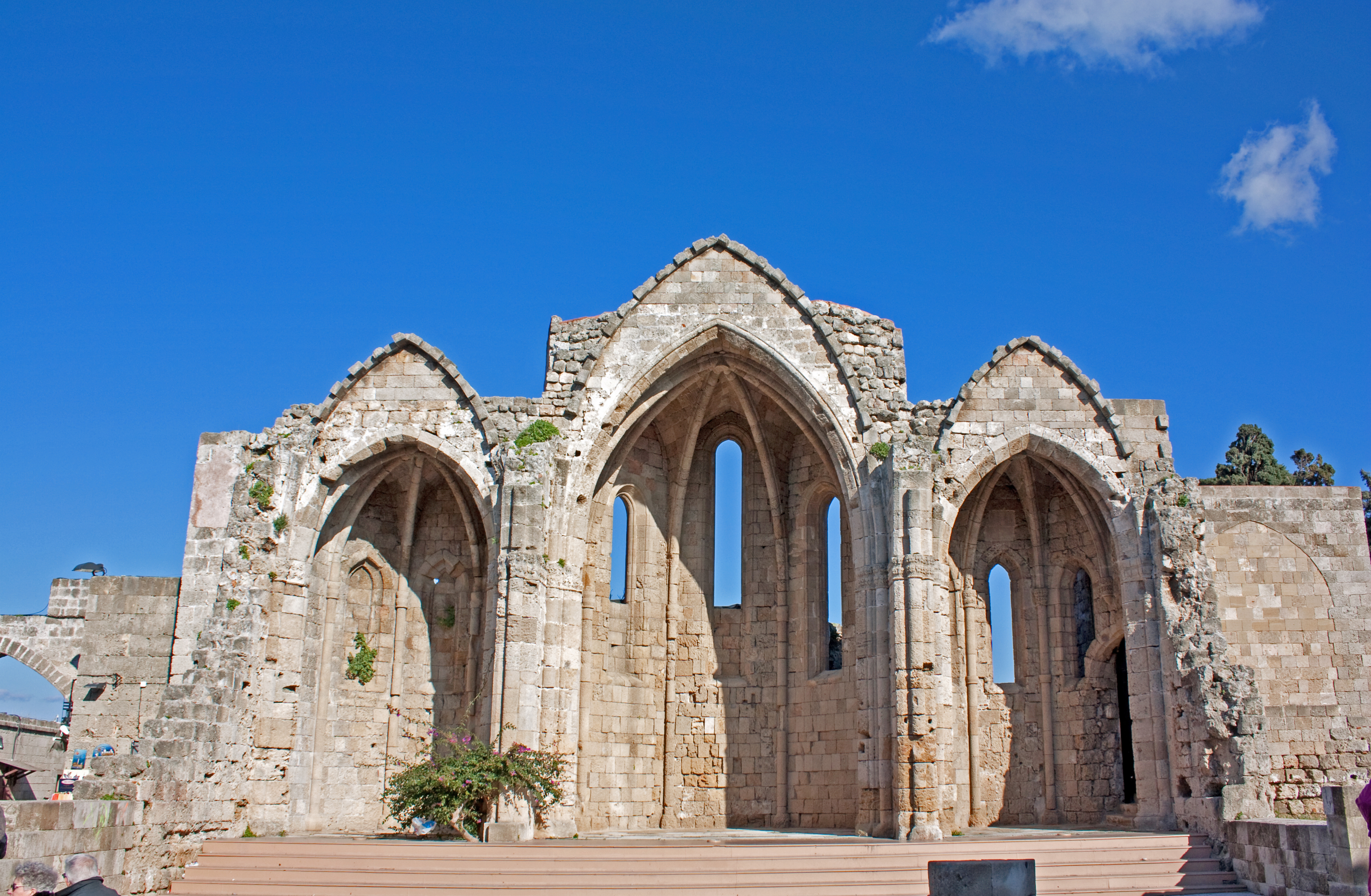
Church of Virgin, Rhodes (city)

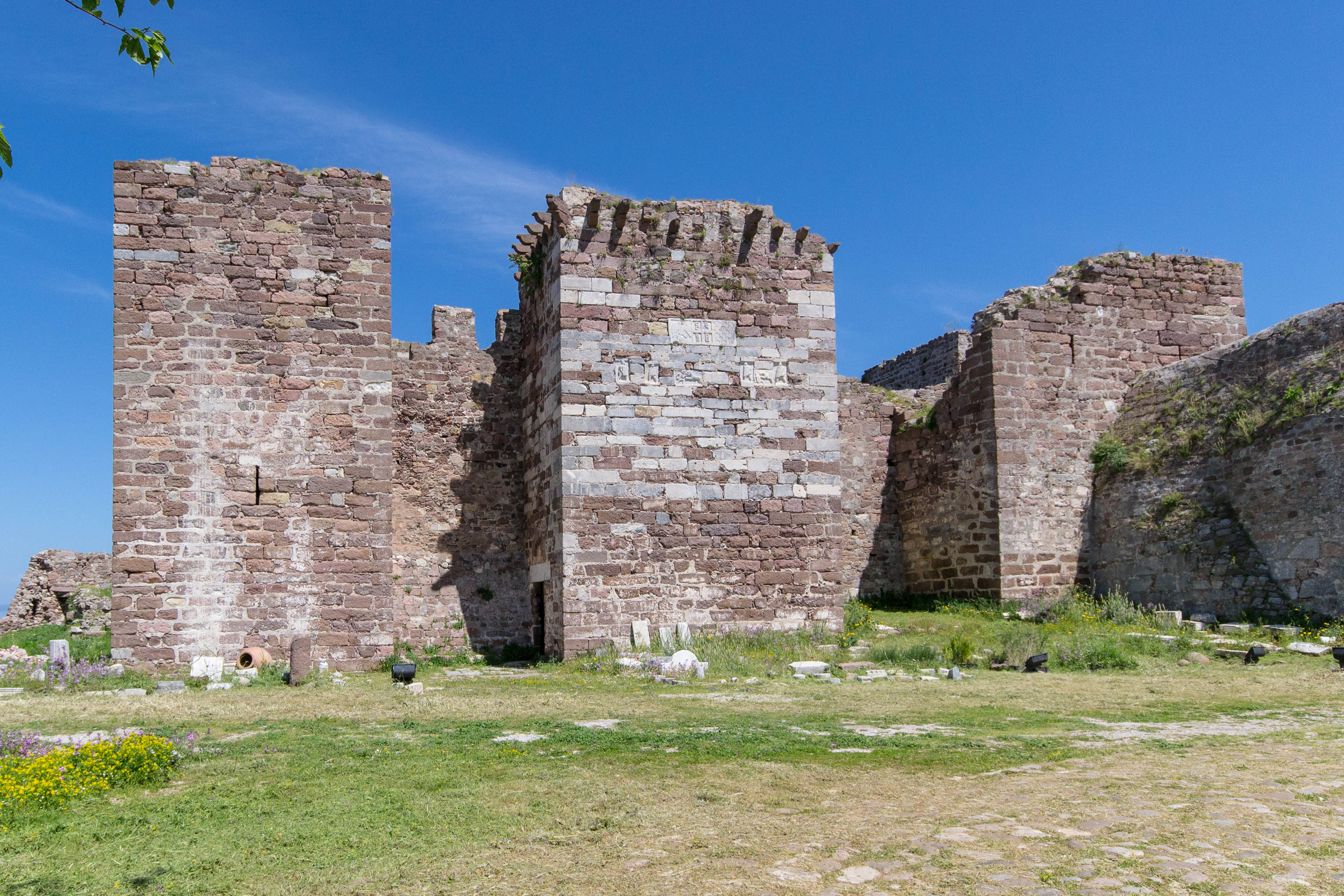
Genoese Castle of Mytilene

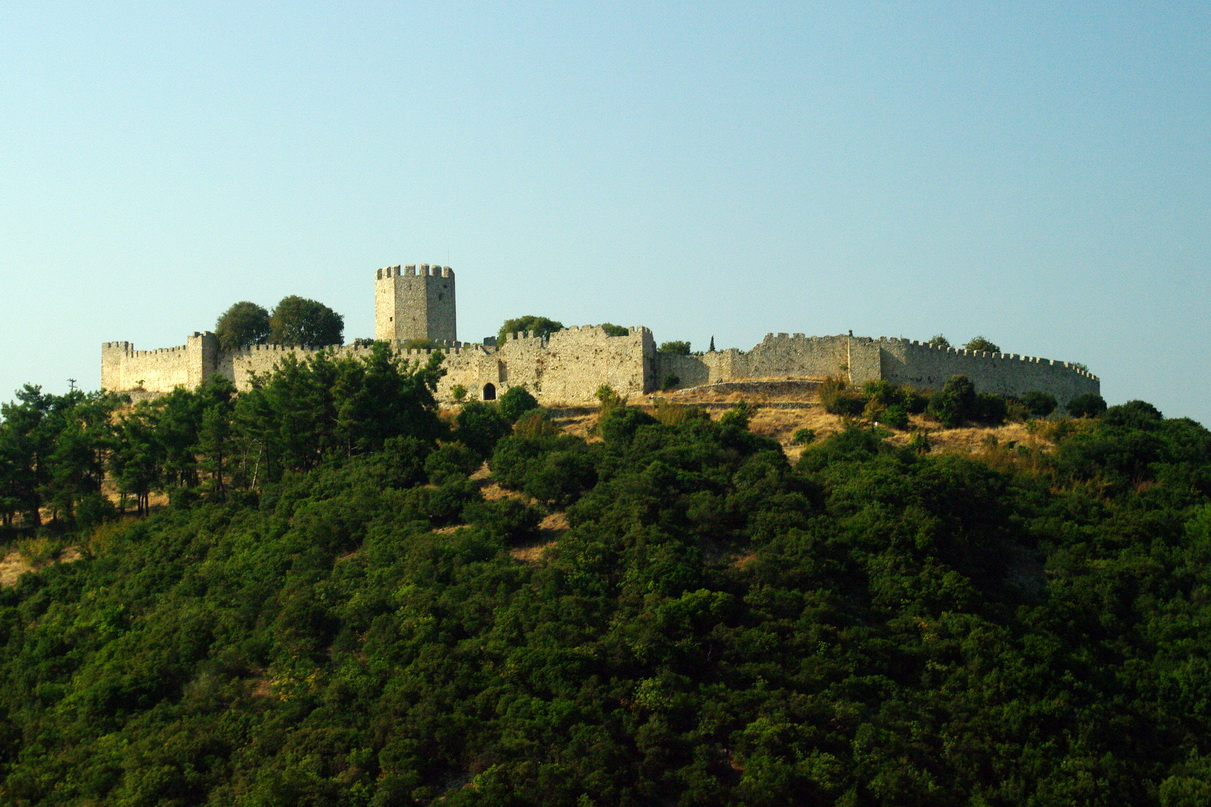
Platamon Castle

Venetian possessions (till 1797)

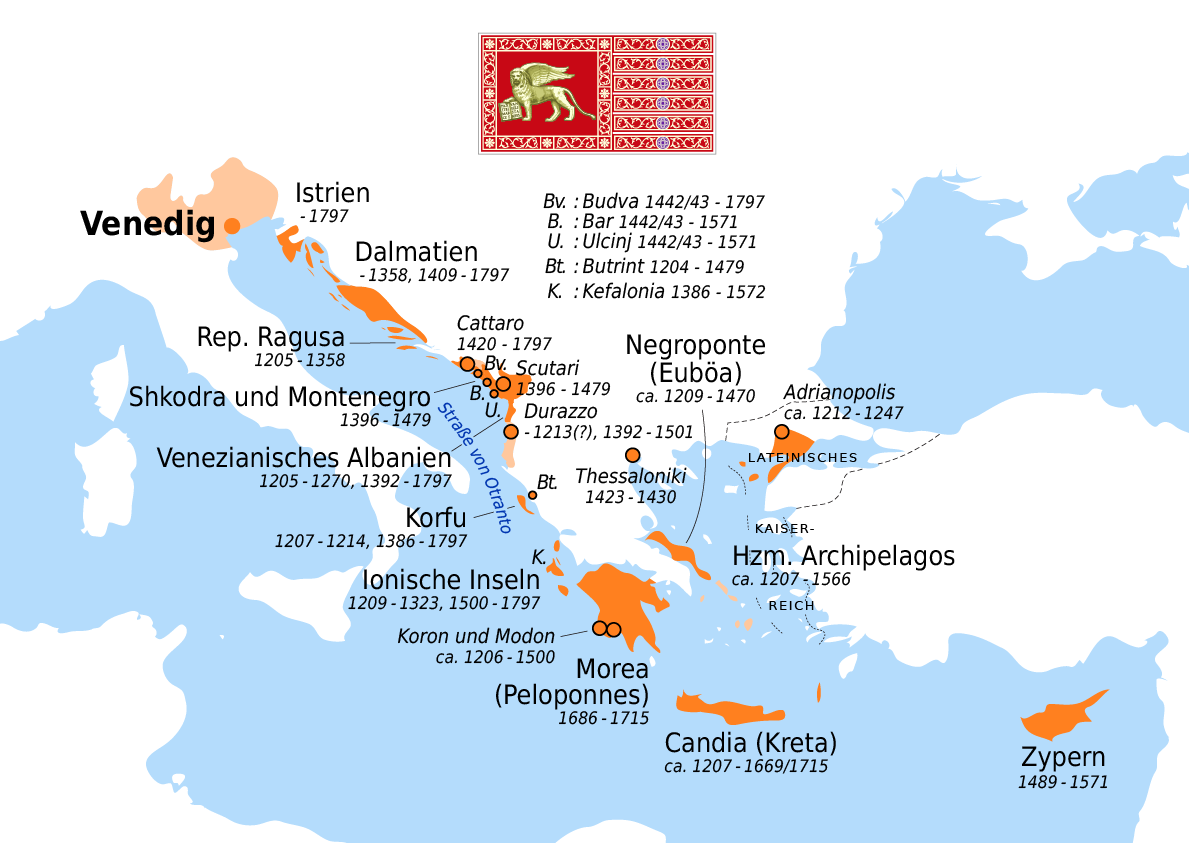
Stato da Màr of the Republic of Venice

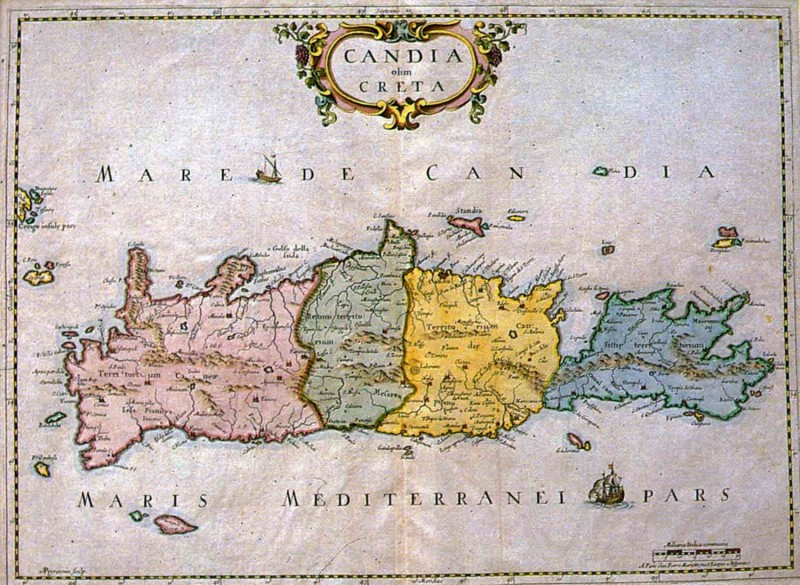
Map of the Kingdom of Candia

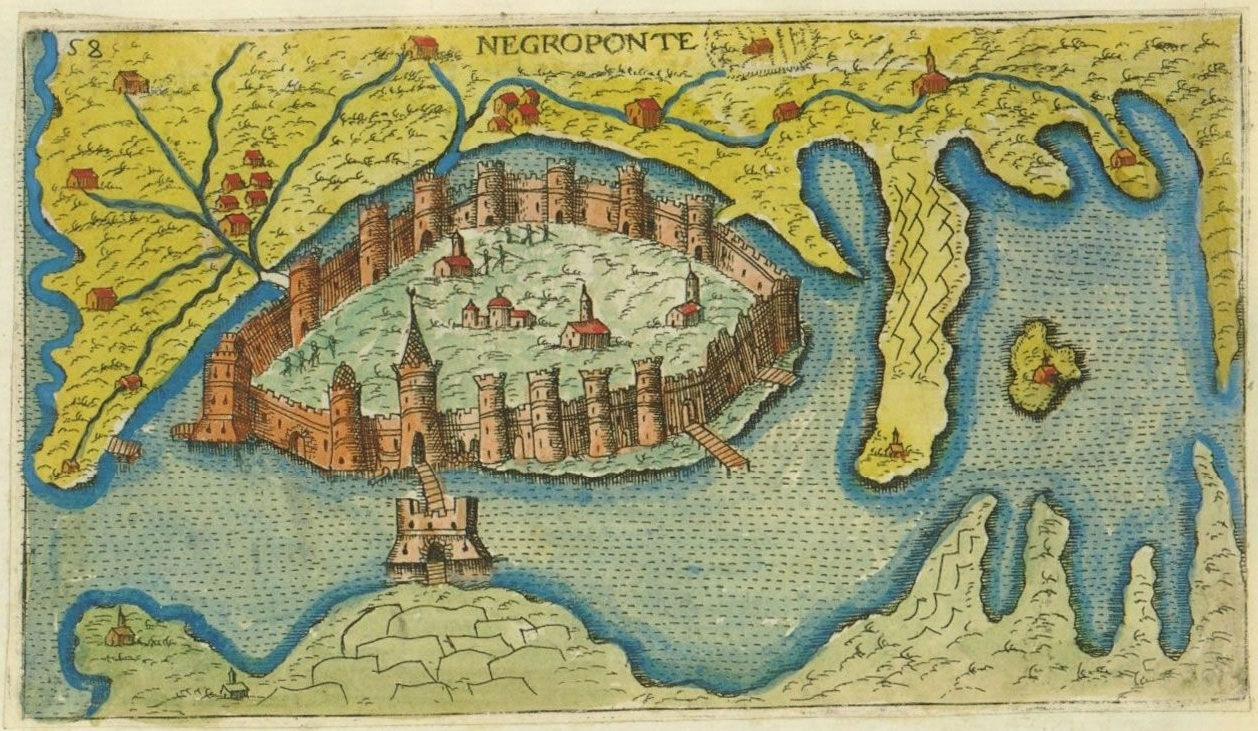
Venetian map of Negroponte (Chalkis)

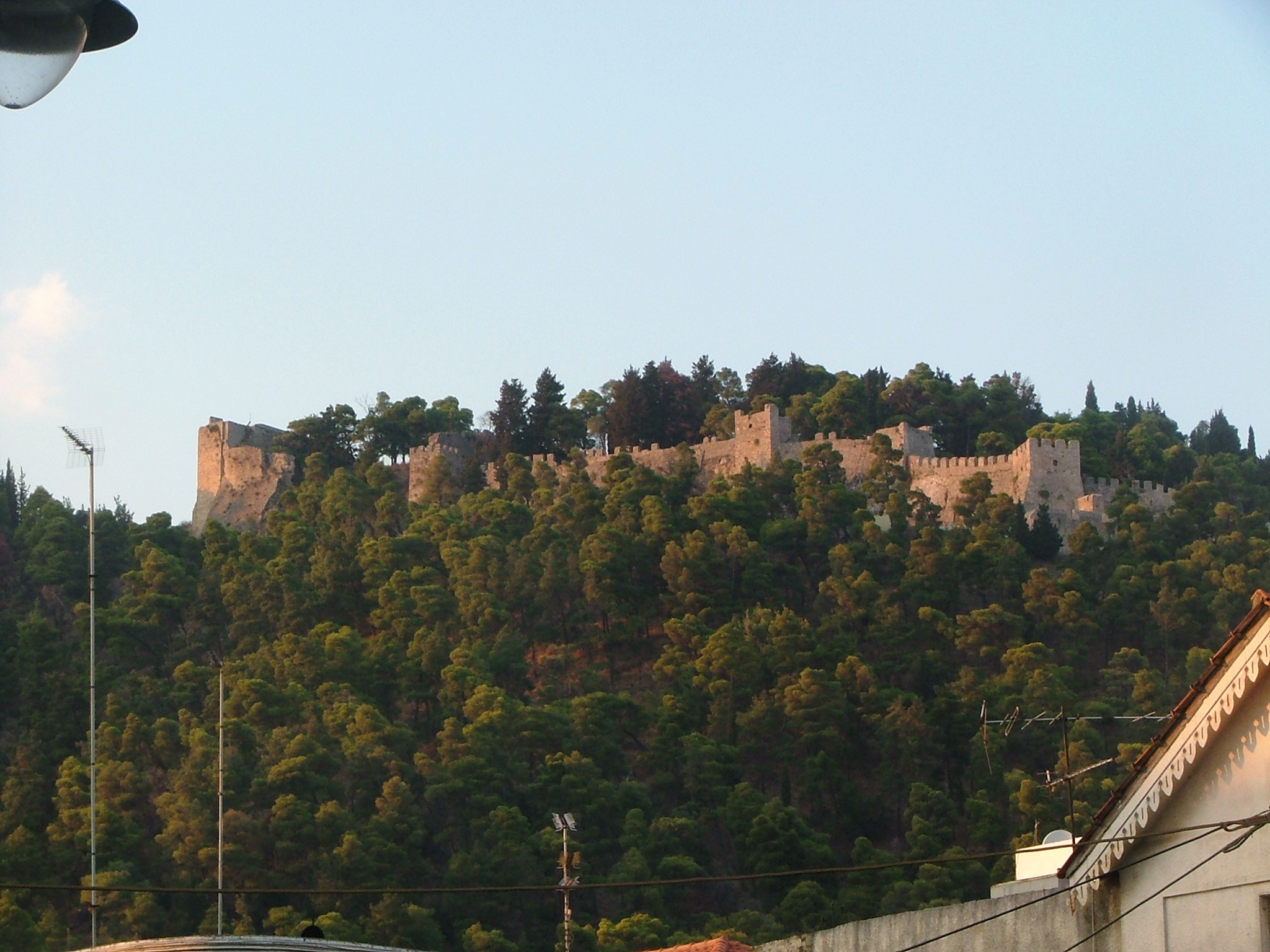
Fortress of Nafpaktos

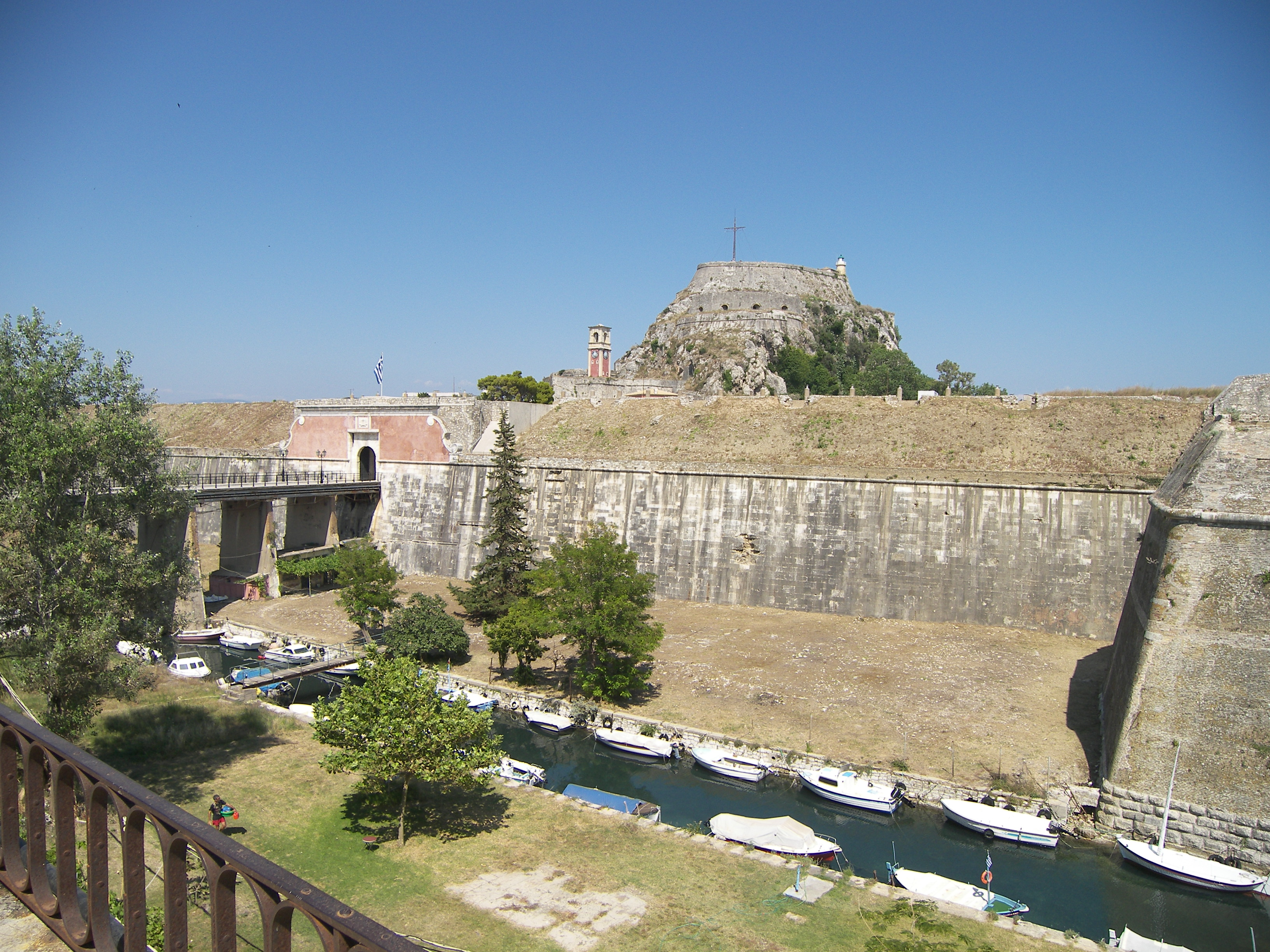
Old Fortress, Corfu

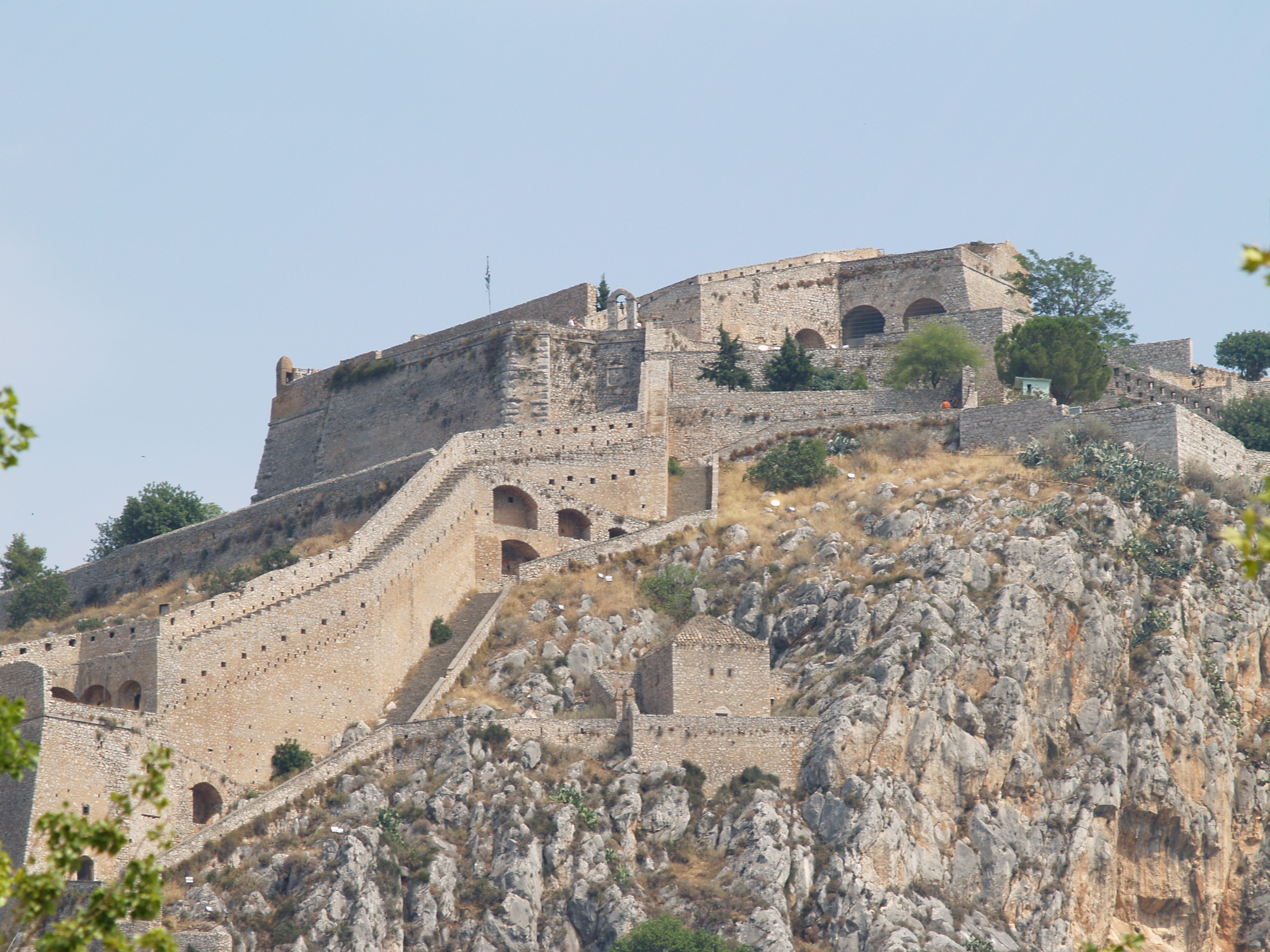
Palamidi, Nafplion

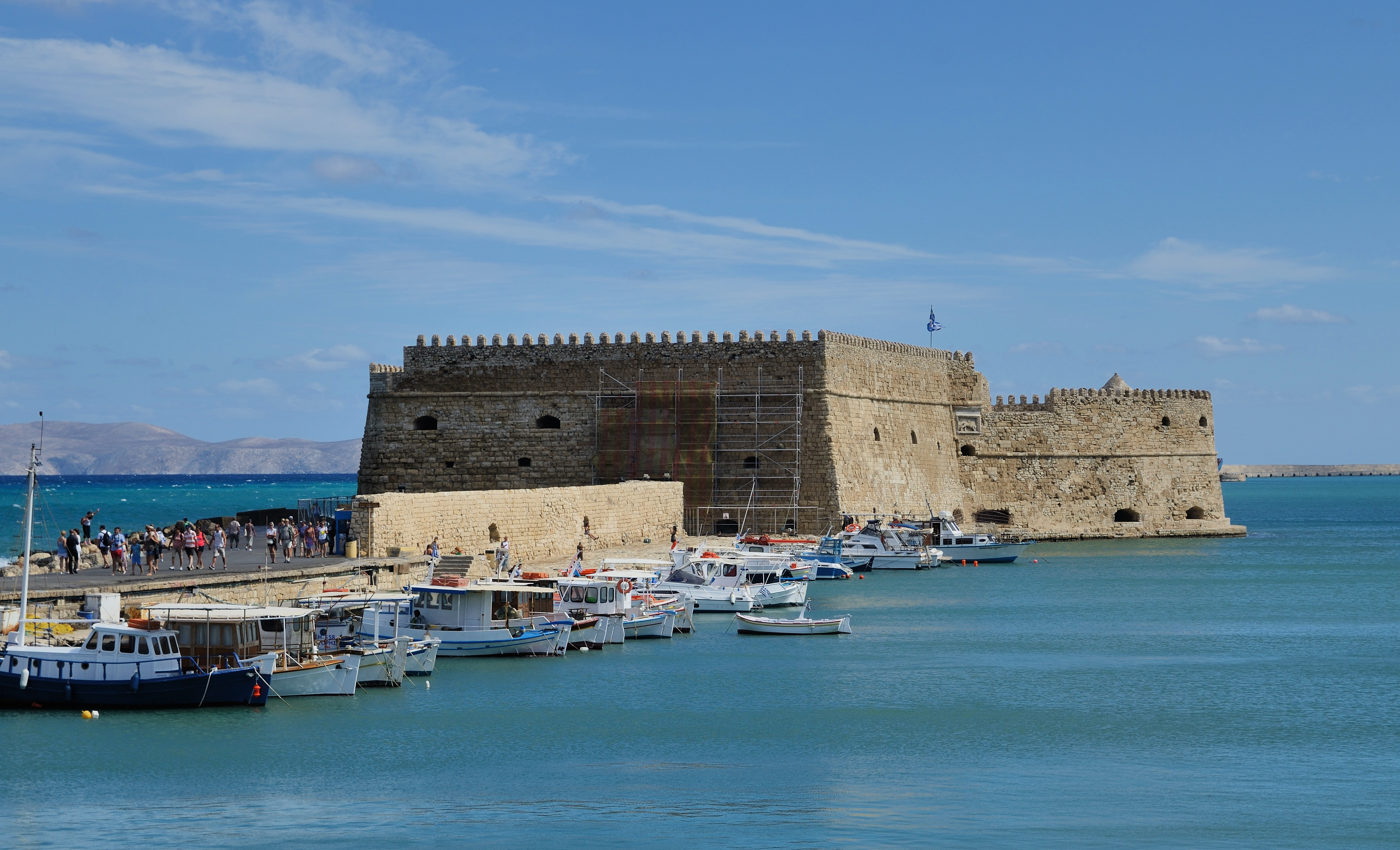
Rocca a Mare fortress in Heraklion

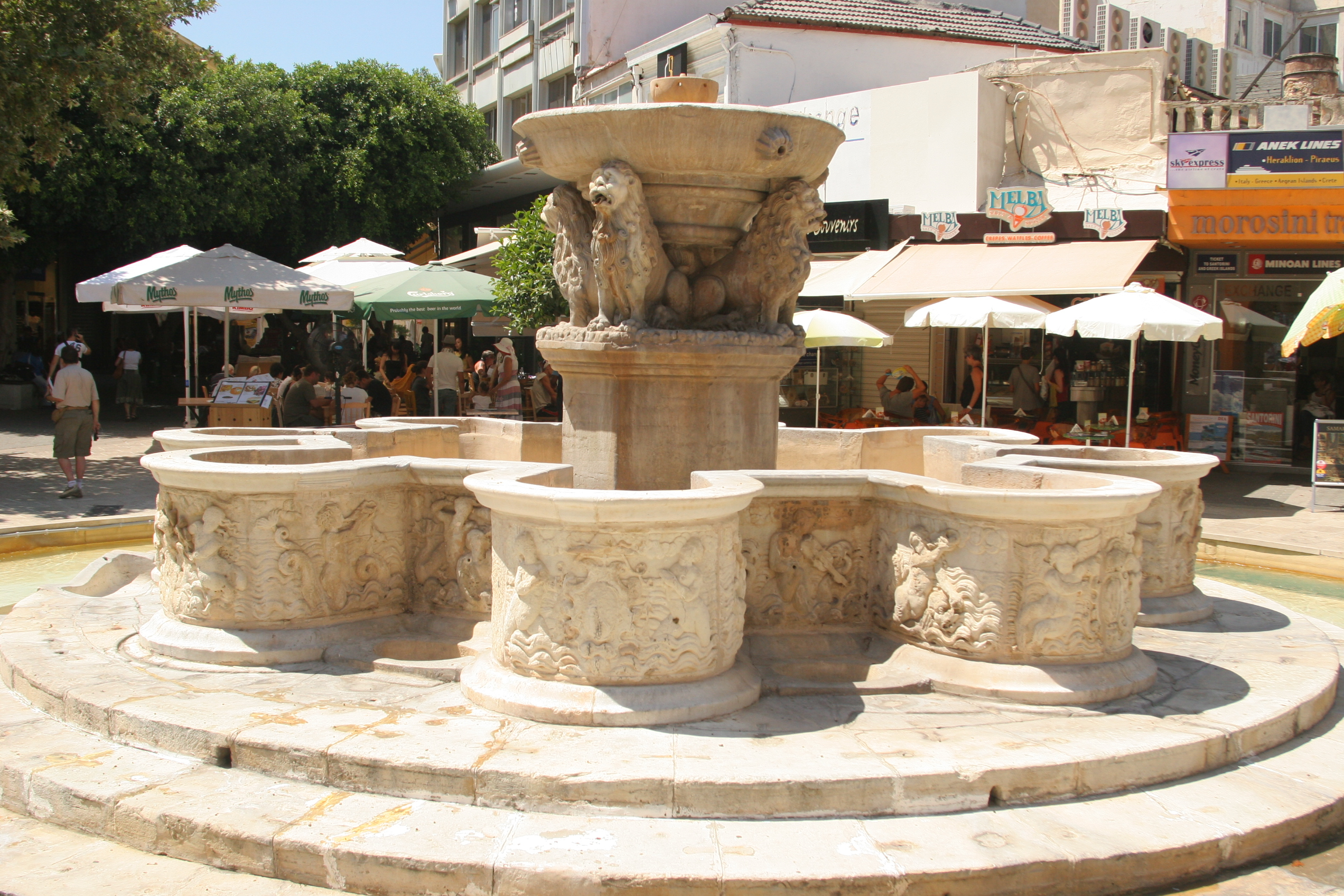
The Morosini fountain, Lions Square, Heraklion

== See also ==
- Latin Church in the Middle East
- Timeline of Orthodoxy in Greece (1204–1453)
- Kingdom of Cyprus
- Gasmouloi

== Sources ==
- Bon, Antoine (1969). La Morée franque. Recherches historiques, topographiques et archéologiques sur la principauté d'Achaïe [The Frankish Morea. Historical, Topographic and Archaeological Studies on the Principality of Achaea] (in French). Paris: De Boccard.
- Fine, John V. A. (1994) [1987]. The Late Medieval Balkans: A Critical Survey from the Late Twelfth Century to the Ottoman Conquest. Ann Arbor, Michigan: University of Michigan Press. ISBN 978-0-472-10079-8.
- Maltezou, Chrysa A. (1988). "Η Κρήτη στη Διάρκεια της Περίοδου της Βενετοκρατίας ("Crete during the Period of Venetian Rule (1211–1669)")". In Panagiotakis, Nikolaos M. (ed.). Crete, History and Civilization (in Greek). Vol. II. Vikelea Library, Association of Regional Associations of Regional Municipalities. pp. 105–162.
- Miller, William (1908). The Latins in the Levant: A History of Frankish Greece (1204–1566). London: John Murray.
- Setton, Kenneth M. (1978). The Papacy and the Levant (1204–1571), Volume II: The Fifteenth Century. Vol. 2. Philadelphia: The American Philosophical Society. ISBN 0-87169-127-2.
- Topping, Peter (1975). "The Morea, 1364–1460". In Setton, Kenneth M.; Hazard, Harry W. (eds.). A History of the Crusades, Volume III: The Fourteenth and Fifteenth Centuries. Vol. 3. Madison and London: University of Wisconsin Press. pp. 141–166. ISBN 0-299-06670-3.
