= Kato Pedina =

Kato Pedina Κάτω Πεδινά
- Community
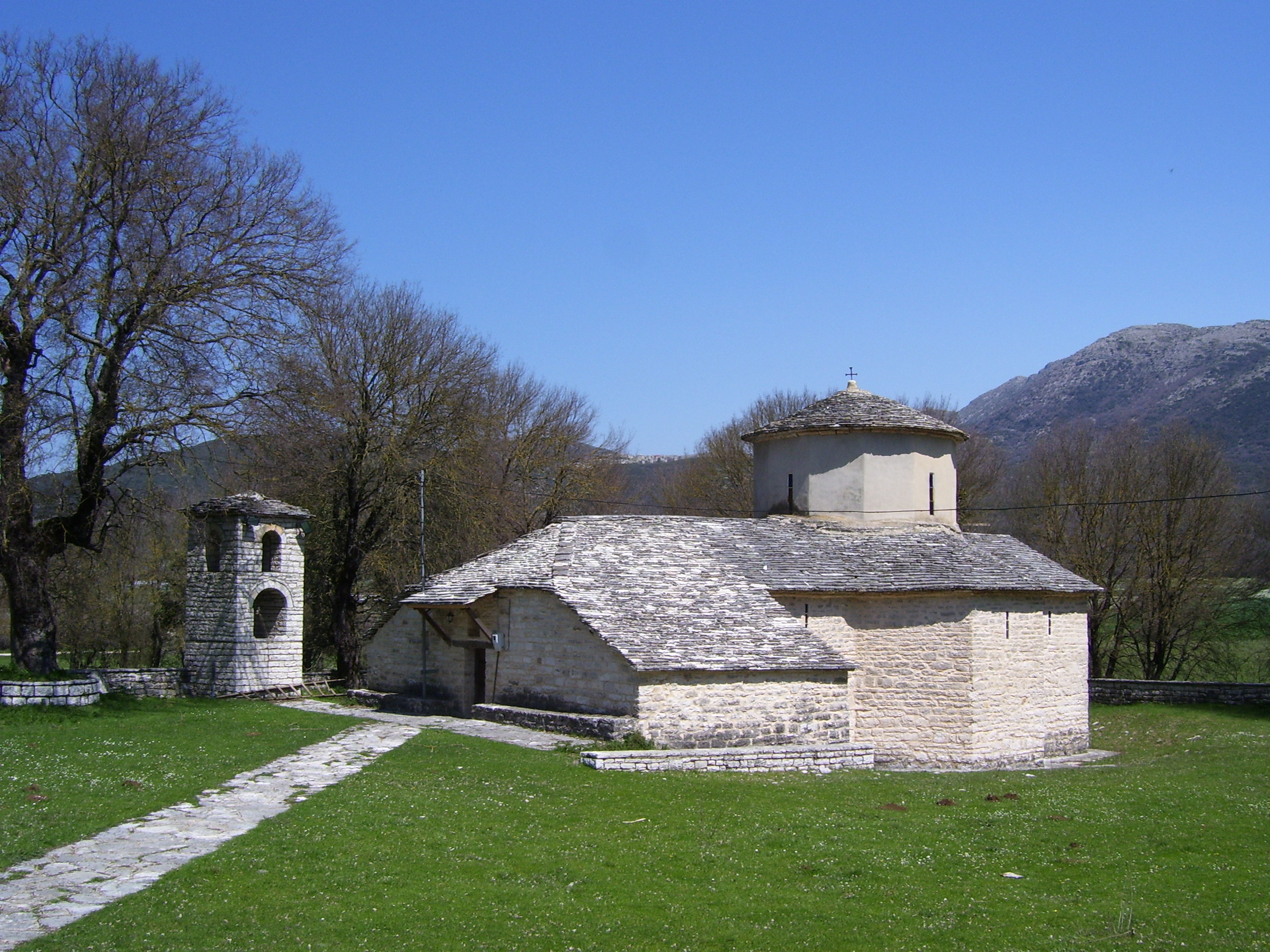
- Church of Kato Pedina

- Location within Greece
- Coordinates: 39°52.7′N 20°40.3′E
- Country: Greece
- Administrative region: Epirus
- Regional unit: Ioannina
- Municipality: Zagori
- Municipal unit: Central Zagori
- Elevation: 940 m (3,080 ft)

Population (2021)
  - Community: 68
- Time zone: UTC+2 (EET)
  - Summer (DST): UTC+3 (EEST)
- Vehicle registration: ΙΝ

Kato Pedina (Greek: Άνω Πεδινά, before 1928: Κάτω Σουδενά, Kato Soudena, between 1928 and 1929: Κάτω Κάμπος, Kato Kampos) is a village in the Ioannina regional unit in Epirus, Greece. It is in the municipality of Zagori. Its population was 68 in the 2021 census. Kato Pedina is one of the Zagori villages, also known as Zagorochoria, and is in the municipal unit of Central Zagori. It is situated on a mountainside at 940 m elevation, in the northwestern foothills of the Mitsikeli mountains. The village is located on the edge of an extensive plateau (altitude 1000 m.), known locally as Varko (or Varka).

== Name ==
The villages (Upper and Lower) were recorded in a chrysobull from 1361 by Serbian ruler Simeon Uroš to the feudal lord John Tzafa Orsini Douka. The villages were recorded as Stoudena in a document from 1627. In the late 19th century, the scholar Ioannis Lambridis wrote that both villages were called Stoudena until 1634 and etymologised the toponym as meaning 'cold place'. The linguist Max Vasmer gave etymologies for each form of the toponym. Soudena derived from the Slavic sǫdьnъ, stemming from sǫdъ 'court', which the linguist Kostas Oikonomou excluded as there are no examples of the inflection of the Slavic ǫ in Greek as u. Alternatively, Vasmer derived the placename from the Latin sudis, where the Greek preposition suda originates from.

Vasmer stated Stoudena is from the Slavic studenъ 'cold'. The linguist Phaedon Malingoudis derived the toponym from Slavic sǫdъ, not directly from the preposition but from the proper noun Suden. Malingoudis stated the etymology of the toponym must exclude the adjectival form soudinos, stemming from souda and the suffix -inos, and also sondina 'fields, estates' as both presuppose an unmarked type and for phonetic reasons, since the inversion of i into e near n occurs rarely, while it occurs frequently near liquids.

Taking the above into account, Oikonomou, referring to the original form Studena, derived the placename from the Slavic adjectival studenъ 'cold', by omission of the noun selo 'village'. Later the form Soudena emerged through the etymological influence of the word souda from the form studena and zdina according to northern Greek phonetics where u was elided, e shifted to i, and the voicing of s in the new consonant cluster sđ arose after the elimination of the unstressed u.

Late 20th century scholarly editions of the 1361 chrysobull transcribe the toponym as Pedanata. Oikonomou wrote that the chrysobull name is due to an error from a scribe or copyist who combined the placename Pedana with the article ta. The name is formed from the epithet Pedina which through linguistic assimilation became Pedana as i changed into a. In the 19th century edition of the chrysobull by the scholar Panagiotis Aravantinos, he corrected the text and wrote in a note the name Pedanata is a corrupted form. The village was renamed to Pedina in 1927. Oikonomou stated the motivations among the individuals responsible for the renaming of the village remain unknown.

== Demographics ==
The village is inhabited by Greeks, and some Sarakatsani who settled in the village during the early 20th century. The Sarakatsani are Greek speakers.

== See also ==
- List of settlements in the Ioannina regional unit
