= Perama, Ioannina =

Perama Πέραμα
- Municipal unit
- Location within the regional unit

- Location within Greece
- Coordinates: 39°42′N 20°51′E
- Country: Greece
- Administrative region: Epirus
- Regional unit: Ioannina
- Municipality: Ioannina

Area
  - Municipal unit: 105.725 km^{2} (40.821 sq mi)
  - Community: 7.597 km^{2} (2.933 sq mi)

Population (2021)
  - Municipal unit: 4,695
  - Municipal unit density: 44.41/km^{2} (115.0/sq mi)
  - Community: 1,943
  - Community density: 255.8/km^{2} (662.4/sq mi)
- Time zone: UTC+2 (EET)
  - Summer (DST): UTC+3 (EEST)
- Vehicle registration: ΙΝ

Perama (Greek: Πέραμα) is a town and a former municipality in the Ioannina regional unit, Epirus, Greece. Since the 2011 local government reform it is part of the municipality Ioannina, of which it is a municipal unit. It lies about 4 km north of central Ioannina. The town's name means "passage" and it lies on the northern edge of lake Pamvotis (Greek: Παμβώτις).

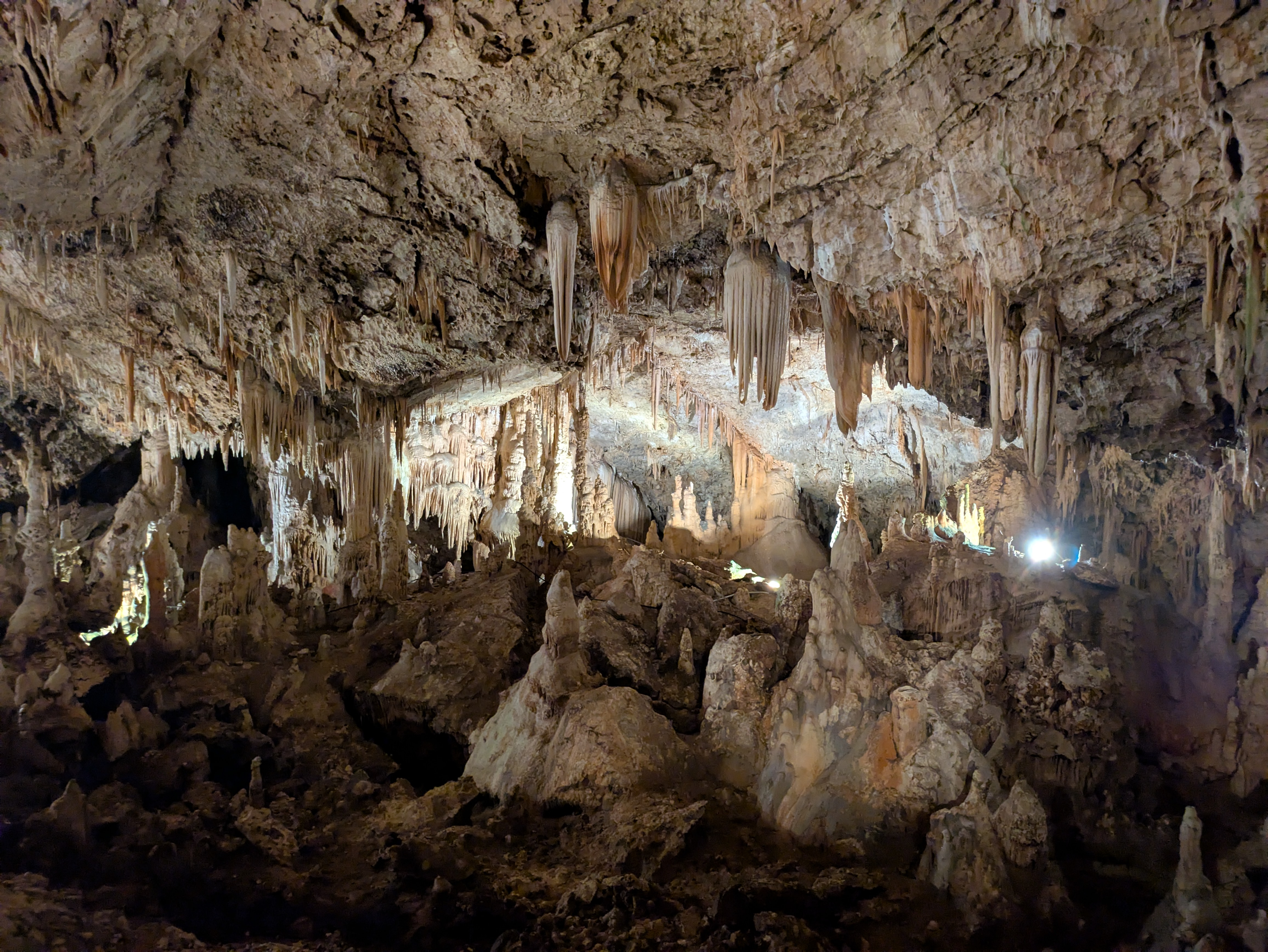
Interior of the Perama Cave

It is famous for its cave, known as the "Cave of Perama" (Greek: Σπήλαιο Περάματος). The cave, extending five kilometres below the ground and having been explored fully only up to one kilometre, has a remarkable arrangement of stalagmites and stalactites. An 11th-century church in the town dedicated to Saint Haralambos and reputedly built by Byzantine Emperor Alexius Comnenus is in a bad state of repair and is rarely open to the general public. The town lies on the EO6 road between Igoumenitsa and Metsovo.

The municipal unit has an area of 105.725 km^{2}, the community 7.597 km^{2}. The municipal unit has a population of 4,695 inhabitants (2021). Its largest settlements are Pérama (pop. 1,943), Krýa (784), Kranoúla (643), Amfithéa (613) and Perívleptos (391).
