= Ioannina Island =

Lake island in Epirus, Greece

Ioannina Island Νήσος Ιωαννίνων
- Municipal unit
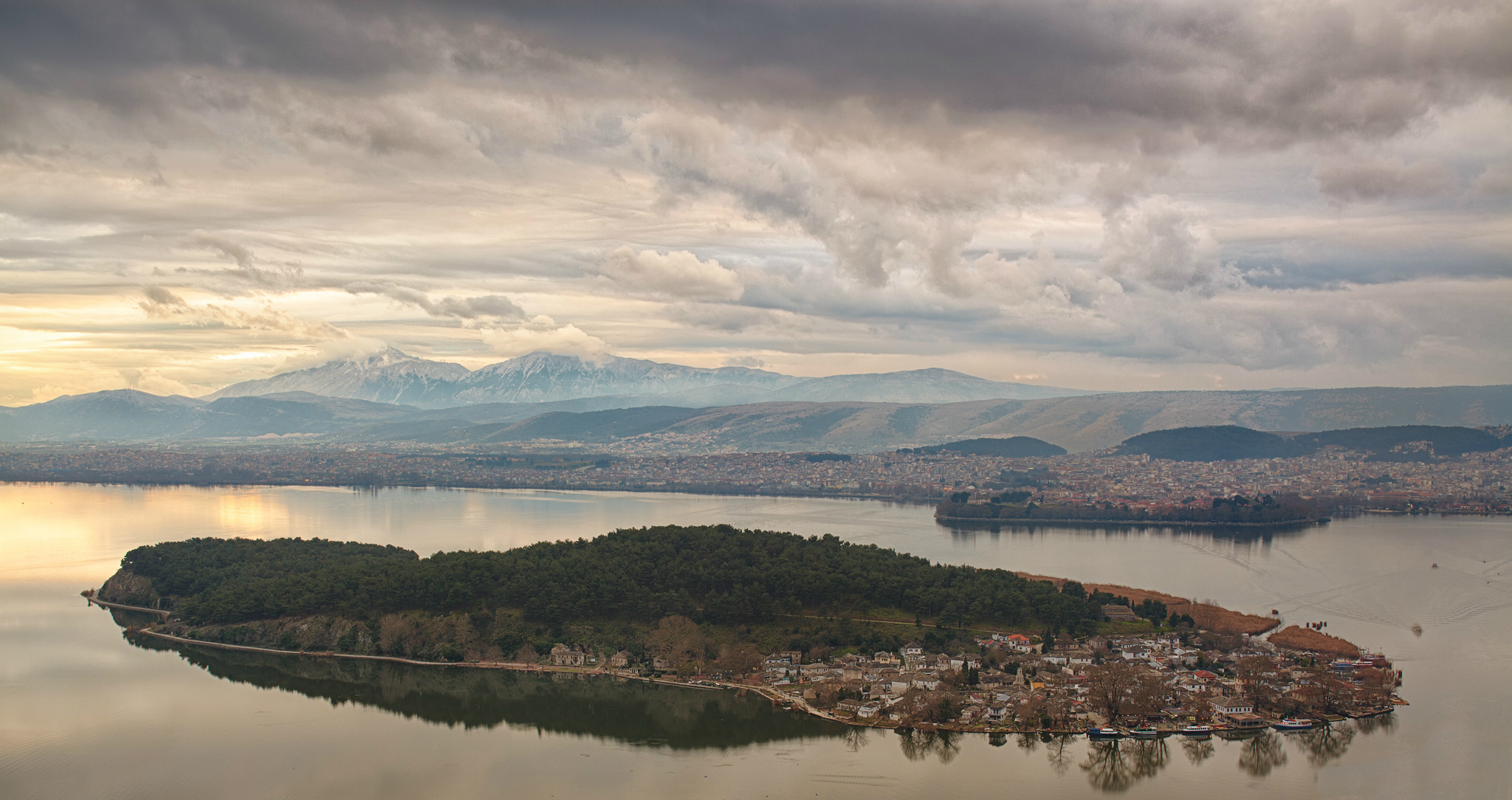
- Ioannina Island

- Location within the regional unit

- Location within Greece
- Coordinates: 39°40′39″N 20°52′30″E
- Country: Greece
- Administrative region: Epirus
- Regional unit: Ioannina
- Municipality: Ioannina

Area
  - Municipal unit: 0.675 km^{2} (0.261 sq mi)

Population (2021)
  - Municipal unit: 187
  - Municipal unit density: 277/km^{2} (718/sq mi)
- Time zone: UTC+2 (EET)
  - Summer (DST): UTC+3 (EEST)
- Vehicle registration: ΙΝ

Ioannina Island (Greek: Νήσος Ιωαννίνων) is an island in the Lake of Ioannina, Epirus, Greece, and a municipal unit of the municipality of Ioannina. It has a land area of 0.675 km^{2}, with a maximum length of 800 meters and a maximum width of 500 meters. It is one of only two inhabited lake islands in Greece, the other being Agios Achilleios. It is reached by boat from the city of Ioannina or by ferry from the nearby shore.

== History ==
The island is mentioned since 13th century when the first monastery, Saint Nicholas Monastery, was built by Michael Philanthropinos, a Byzantine aristocrat, who along with other prominent Byzantine families, left Constantinople after the 1st Fall of the Crusaders in 1204, to settle in just established Despotate of Epirus. Shortly after, Stratigopoulos, another aristocrat of Byzantium, founds the homonym Monastery, which later, during the Ottoman period, it was named Diliou Monastery, by the name of the affluent family that maintained it.

Though the following years were marked by the constant raids of the Albanians and the conquest of Ioannina by the Ottomans in 1430, however, they did not affect the acne of these Monasteries, that reached their peak in the 16th century. It was then that the extraordinary frescoes were painted. Especially, in the Filanthropinos Monastery, frescoes are a remarkable example of the School of northwestern Greece. In that particular Monastery, there was a great library, including "Kouvaras", a manuscript code containing rare texts on the area's history. Because of the great acne, two more Monasteries were built, that of Saint Nicholas Methodius (later named Saint Eleousa), also with beautiful murals, which, in 1872 and until 1922, was operated as a priestly school, and, on the northeast side of the island, the Prodromos Monastery, built in a rare architectural style.

In the 17th century, three last Monasteries were built, that of Transfiguration of Jesus, with Western frescoes, which after the disasters by the Sultan's burning in 1822, belongs to Eleousa Monastery, the Monastery of Prophet Elias, on top of the pine-covered hill in the middle of the Island and the Monastery of Saint Panteleimon where someone can visit the well-maintained cells. In the north cells, a collection of manuscripts and old copies from the Monasteries is kept, while in the south cells the Museum of the (pre) revolutionary period is housed.

The little settlement on the island was built possibly during 17th century and it flourished in the Ali Pasha Era. In this place, Ali Pasha died in 1822, chased by Ottoman army. The exceptional Late Byzantine Monasteries are seven in number, so much so that the Island is ranked as the 3rd largest monastic state in Greece, after Mount Athos and Meteora.

The island was ceded to Greece from the Ottoman Empire in 1913 after the Treaty of Bucharest that ended the Balkan Wars, along with the rest of the Greek part of Epirus and multiple other territories.

Until the 2011 reform of local government, it was administrated as a community. Since then it has been a municipal unit.

=== Historical population ===
Historical population
Year	Pop.	±%
1991	348	—
2001	354	+1.7%
2011	219	−38.1%
2021	187	−14.6%

== Places of interest ==
- Filantropinos Monastery or Saint Nicholas: It is built in 1291 or 1292, it is the oldest monastery of the island and it is visitable. It is located south-east of the island's settlement.
- Saint Nicholas or Ntiliou Monastery: It is located south of Philanthropinos Monastery, it was built short after this monastery and it is visitable.
- St Eleousa Monastery: It is located south of Saint Nicholas Ntiliou Monastery. Initially, the monastery was named Monastery of Agios Nikalaos Methodatos. It was built possibly in 16th century and it is visitable.
- Prophet Elias Monastery: It is located in the highest point of the island and it was built possibly during 17th century in place of one oldest church.
- Transfiguration of Jesus Monastery: It is located in the southwest part of the island, built possibly at the beginning of the 17th century.
- Prodromos Monastery: It is located south-east of the island's settlement, built at the beginning of 16th century.
- Saint Panteleimonas Monastery: It is located near Monastery of Prodromos. Ali Pasha was murdered in this place and it is visitable.
- Settlement of the island: The settlement is an important sample of traditional Epirotic architecture with stone houses and slate roofs. It is located in the north part of the island.
