= Reaction in Greece to the Yugoslav Wars =

The "Greece-Bosnia and Herzegovina Friendship Building" in Sarajevo

The reaction in Greece to the Yugoslav Wars refers to the geopolitical relations between Greece and the countries that emerged from the breakup of Yugoslavia as a result of the Yugoslav Wars, as well as the international stance of the former during the years of the conflict in terms of activities by state and non-state actors (enterprises, peace-keeping forces, non-governmental organizations and the Church of Greece, among others).

During the 1990s, public opinion in Greece largely expressed support for the Serbs in the conflict. Greek public sympathy for the Serb cause has been attributed to the two nations' shared Orthodox Christian heritage. In 1993, Seraphim of Athens, the Archbishop of Athens and All Greece, proclaimed that the "Orthodox Church is on the side of the Orthodox Serb people". Despite any reactions, Greece allowed the NATO forces pass to the north during the war.

Greece also provided substantial humanitarian aid to all suffering civilians during the wars, without distinction of ethnicity or religion.

== Background and historical context ==
In the first phase of the wars, Greek policy, in alignment with Western policy at the time, sought to prevent the breakup of the Yugoslav Federation. Greek perceptions of the crisis were also affected by fears of expansionist attempts by Turkey to forge an Islamic branch in the Balkans.

As such, Greek political elites quickly adopted a defensive posture towards the new Balkan realities: they viewed the breakup of Yugoslavia as a threat to stability and consequently initially aligned with Serbia. However, Greece never opposed the developments of Western diplomacy in response to the wars in Croatia and Bosnia-Herzegovina, but public opinion in Greece remained strongly opposed to any form of military intervention.

=== Public opinion and church response ===
During the 1990s, Greek public opinion expressed support for the actions of the Serbs, making Greece differ in its position from fellow EU states. The Church of Greece expressed similar sentiments, when in 1993, Archbishop Serafim said that "the Orthodox Church is on the side of the Orthodox Serb people". There was a lack of criticism from Church of Greece officials toward war crimes committed by the Serbs.

Priests made regular visits to Serbia and to Bosnian areas under Serb control, and assisted the Serbs both materially and spiritually. Some of them were decorated by Biljana Plavšić, then President of Republika Srpska. At the time of the Bosnian War, the Church of Greece declared Radovan Karadžić, then leader of the Bosnian Serbs, a Christian hero and awarded him with honours in 1993 at a large gathering in Piraeus Stadium.

The Church of Greece supported materially and morally the Bosnian Serb leadership in the Bosnian War. Its approach was linked to Greek foreign policy of the early 1990s that aspired to the creation of an "Orthodox arc" between Orthodox states in the Balkans, although the policy changed after 1995. Christodoulos of Athens after his election as Archbishop of Greece in 1998 used sermons to criticise NATO and western actions during the Kosovo War. The Church leadership along with elements of Greek society espousing traditional and anti-European Union views had attempted to leverage their influence to steer Greek state policy toward a pro-Serbian/Yugoslav direction.

== History ==
In March 1995, a unit of 100 Greek volunteers that came to be known as the Greek Volunteer Guard was formed in support of the Army of the Republika Srpska at the request of Ratko Mladić. Golden Dawn members also joined Serbian paramilitary groups and were participants of the Srebrenica massacre. Eudoxis Doxiadis notes that the Greek Volunteer Guard found a positive reaction in Greece. Journalist Takis Michas considers the politicisation of the Church of Greece in the period of the Yugoslav Wars one of the most important political developments in Greece in the 1990s.

=== Kosovo War ===
As a result of the Kosovo War and NATO bombing of Yugoslavia a number of concerns were raised in the Greek media such as the use of depleted uranium in NATO's weaponry in Greece's proximity. Additionally the Kosovo war was seen in Greece as an American attempt to undermine the role of the European Union and to distract public attention in the United States from the Clinton–Lewinsky scandal. Fears that the Kosovo war might create a Greater Albania also emerged in the Greek press. Additionally, but less frequently, concerns were raised about a possible settlement of Kosovar refugees in Southern Albania/Northern Epirus, which would alter the demographic balance of the area in territories inhabited by the Greek minority. During the war in Kosovo the Greek Left also favoured the Serbs and considered NATO's military intervention as a blatant exercise of neo-imperialist power. More than 10,000 Greeks participated in the anti-war and anti-NATO protests.

Greek humanitarian aid assisted both sides in the conflict. Thanks to Greece's general attitude towards the war, Yugoslav authorities treated Greek humanitarian agencies favourably and without any suspicion. This enable Greek NGO's to perform their duties unobstructed. As such a Greek medical group was the first foreign humanitarian aid NGO to operate in the affected region less than a month after NATO's military intervention begun. In general the amount of resources provided to the refugees of the war (primarily Albanians) represents the largest humanitarian campaign in modern Greek history. The Greek Army established a refugee camp in Pogradec, southeast Albania. Moreover, humanitarian aid was also offered through less official channels from Greece, for example from the Church of Greece which was active in southern Albania.

== Missions ==
On 10 June 1999, Greece provided facilities to ease the advance of forces in the context of the so-called “JOINT Guardian” Plan. Under UN auspices (Chapter VII of the UN Charter), the Multinational Force was called Kosovo Force (KFOR) and was a peace enforcement operation.

On 11 June 1999, Greece decided to participate with a force at Brigade Level, providing assistance for the implementation of the mission to create a secure environment for the population in Kosovo and ensure safe return of the refugees.

The 34th Mechanized Brigade of 1162 men was allocated to KFOR, along with a C-130 air-carrier and its crew, as well as 157 officers and soldiers for Host-Nation Support. The operation was also supported by an Infantry Company with Engineer Elements of more than 60 officers and soldiers, stationed at Thessaloniki.

In Kosovo, the Hellenic Contingent conducted hundreds of reconnaissance, escorting, traffic security and control missions, including not only Weapon Staging Areas guarding, but also monuments guarding like Christian Churches. A recognized achievement was the discovery of an ammunition depot in which a great number of arms and ammunition were hidden. KFOR recognized the achievement as the second most significant and successful discovery.

The Hellenic Contingent in Kosovo destroyed more than 4.000 arms of various types and caliber, which were hidden in shelters by paramilitary and extremist groups, which were and gathered by KFOR.

Furthermore, the Hellenic Contingent contributed greatly to the transportation, escort and delivery of 160 tons of humanitarian aid by "FOCUS" organization to various villages in Kosovo, along with providing medical treatment to the local population.
