= Ieronymos I of Athens =

His Beatitude Ieronymos I
- Archbishop of Athens
- Elected: 14 May 1967
- Term ended: 15 December 1973
- Predecessor: Chrysostomos II
- Successor: Seraphim

Orders
- Ordination: 1938

Personal details
- Born: Ieronymos Kotsonis; 1 May 1905 Ysternia, Tinos, Greece
- Died: November 15, 1988 (aged 83)
- Denomination: Church of Greece
- Profession: Theologian
- Education: University of Athens

Ieronymos I (Greek: Ιερώνυμος Α´, Ierōnymos; Latin: Hieronymus I; English: Jerome I; 1 May 1905 – 15 November 1988) was a Greek monk and theologian, who served as the Archbishop of Athens and All Greece and as such the primate of the Autocephalous Orthodox Church of Greece in 1967–1973, during the Greek military junta of 1967–1974.

== Life ==
He was born Ieronymos Kotsonis (Ιερώνυμος Κοτσώνης) to a poor family in the village of Ysternia, the island of Tinos. His father died three months before his birth, and his mother was soon forced to go to Athens and work as a cook to sustain her family. Thus Ieronymos grew up with relatives until the age of 2, when he went to Athens. He studied at the Rizareios Ecclesiastical School and continued his studies at the Theological Faculty of the University of Athens. After graduation, he went for further studies to Germany (in Munich, Berlin and Bonn) and Britain.

Through his spiritual father, the archimandrite Seraphim Papakostas, he became a protégé of the then-Archbishop of Athens, Chrysanthus. He became a monk and, on 4 January 1939, a deacon. He rose quickly in the ecclesiastical hierarchy, being appointed second secretary of the Holy Synod, becoming presbyter and archimandrite on 23 June 1940. As a close associate of Chrysanthus, he was dismissed from his secretary to the Holy Synod by the collaborationist government during the Axis Occupation of Greece, and spent the Occupation as chaplain of the Evangelismos Hospital. After the occupation, he submitted a dissertation for a position of lecturer at the Theological Faculty, but later withdrew it after quarrelling with his teachers. On 29 September 1949 he was appointed head priest of the Royal Palace. In 1959 finally he was elected as Professor of Canon Law in the Aristotle University of Thessaloniki.

Ieronymos was elected as Archbishop of Athens on 14 May 1967 after the forced resignation of his predecessor, Chrysostomos II, following the military coup d'état of 21 April 1967. Due to his well-known staunchly conservative and anti-communist views, he was widely seen as nominee of the junta's leadership, many of whom had ties to para-religious organizations. He continued to serve under the junta until his resignation on 15 December 1973. His, and by extension the whole Church of Greece's close cooperation with the junta during his primacy continues to be a subject of controversy.

Following his resignation, he retired to his birthplace. He died on 15 November 1988.

Eastern Orthodox Church titles
Preceded by Chrysostomos II	Archbishop of Athens and All Greece; 1967–1973	Succeeded by Seraphim
