= List of archbishops of Athens =

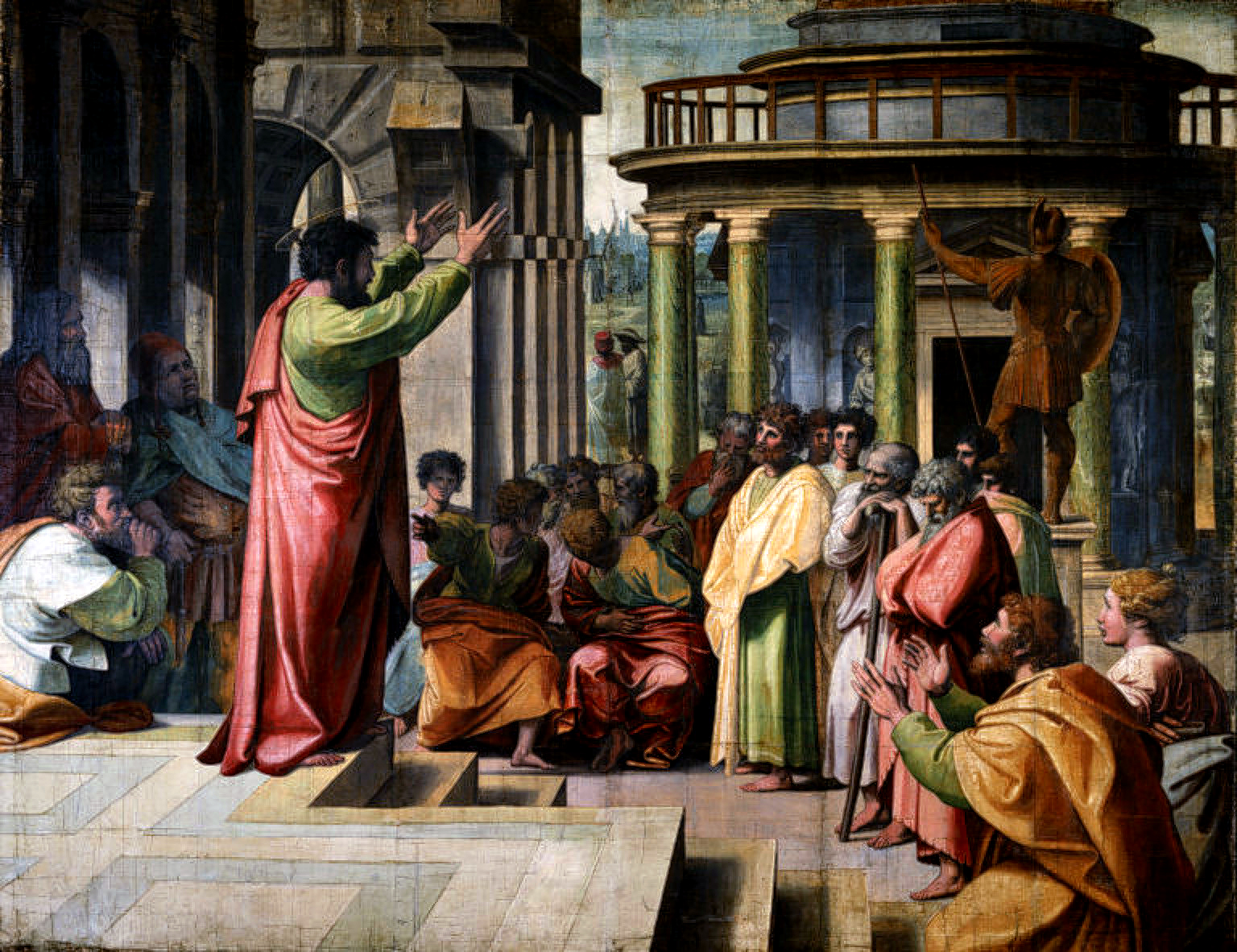
Paul the Apostle delivering the Areopagus sermon in Athens. Raphael, 1515

The following is a list of bishops, metropolitans, and archbishops of Athens. The Church of Athens was created by Paul the Apostle during his second missionary journey, when he preached at the Areopagus, probably in 51 AD. According to the Acts of the Apostles (17:16–34), after the sermon, many became followers of Paul, thus forming the kernel of the Church in Athens. The see of Athens has been unilaterally declared autocephalous on 4 August 1833 (officially recognized by the Ecumenical Patriarchate of Constantinople on 11 July 1850) and was elevated to an archbishopric on 31 December 1923. As the head of the Church of Greece, the holder has styled Archbishop of Athens and All Greece (Greek: Αρχιεπίσκοπος Αθηνών και πάσης Ελλάδος).

== Bishops of Athens ==
No.	Incumbent	From	Until
Roman period (1st century – 395 AD)
1	Hierotheus (uncertain)	?	52
2	Dionysius I (first bishop according to some sources)	52	96
Vacant		96	117
3	Narcissus	117	c. 120
4	Publius	c. 120	125
5	Quadratus	125	129
Vacant		129	?
6	Leonidas	?	250
7	Olympius	?	?
8	Pistus	?	c. 325
9	Clematius	c. 325	?
Byzantine period (395–1205 AD)
10	Modestus	c. 431	c. 451
11	Athanasius I	c.451	c. 458
12	Anatolius	c. 458	c. 459
13	John I	?	550, 595 or 640
Vacant		?	c. 680
14	John II	c. 680	?
15	Andrew	?	693
16	Contias	c. 693	?
17	Theocharistus	?	702
18	Marinus	702	704
19	John III	704	713
20	Gregory I	?	779
21	Adamantius	?	768 or 813
22	John IV	9th century	819
23	Theodosius	9th century	
24	Hypatius	9th century	
25	Demetrius I	9th century	

== Metropolitans of Athens ==
=== Pre-modern period ===
No.	Incumbent	From	Until
Byzantine period (395–1205 AD)
26	Germanus I (Archbishop)	9th century	841
27	Demetrius II (Archbishop)	841	846/857
28	Gabriel I (Archbishop)	846/857	858/860
29	Gregory II (Archbishop)	858/860	9th century
30	Cosmas (Archbishop)	9th century	869/870
31	Nicetas I (Archbishop)	879	881
32	Sabbas I (Archbishop)	c. 881	
33	Anastasius (Archbishop)	881?	889
34	Sabbas II (Archbishop)	889	913
35	George I (Archbishop)	913	921
36	Nicetas II (Archbishop)	921	926
37	Demetrius III (Archbishop)	926	929
38	Hypatius (Archbishop)	11th century	
39	Constantine (Archbishop)	?	975
40	Philip (Metropolitan)	975	981
41	Theodegius	981	1006
42	Michael I	c. 1007	1030
43	Leo I	c. 1030	1060
44	Leo II	1060	1068/9
45	John V	c. 1069	1086
46	Nicetas III	1086	1103
47	Nicephorus	1103	1121
48	Leon III Xeros	1121	1153
49	George II Bourtzes	1153	1160
50	Nicholas I Hagiotheodorites	1160	1175
51	Theophylactus	12th century	
52	George III	c. 1172	c. 1180
53	John VI	c. 1180	c. 1182
54	Michael II Choniates	1182	1222
Latin period (1205–1456 AD), holders in exile or titular until 1388
55	Meletius I	1275	1289
56	Elias	1289	c. 1300
57	Neophytus I	c. 1300	c. 1336
58	Anthimus I	c. 1336	1366
59	Nicodemus	1371	c. 1387
60	Dorotheus I	1388	1392
61	Macarius I	1392	c. 1432
62	Gerbasius	c. 1432	1440
63	Phantinus	1440	1443?
64	Theodore	1443?	c. 1453
Ottoman period (1456–1821/27 AD)
65	Isidore	c. 1456	
66	Dorotheus II		c. 1472
67	Anthimus II	c. 1489	c. 1492
68	Neophytus II	c. 1492	c. 1528
69	Lawrence	1528	1546
70	Callistus	1550	1564
71	Sophronius I	1565	1574?
72	Nicanor	1574	1592
73	Theophanes I	1592	1597
74	Neophytus III	1597	1602
75	Samuel	1602	1602
76	Nathaniel	1602	1606
77	Anthimus III	1606	1611?
78	Cyril I	1611	1619?
79	Metrophanes	1619	1620?
80	Theophanes II	1620?	1633
81	Sophronius II	1633	1636
82	Daniel	1636	1665
83	Anthimus IV	1665	1676
84	Iakovos I	1676	1686
85	Athanasius II	1686	1689
86	Makarius II	1689	1693
87	Anthimus V	1693	1699
88	Cyril II	1699	1703
89	Meletius II	1703	1713
90	Iakovos II	1713	1734
91	Zachary	1734	1740
92	Anthimus VI	1741	1756
(92)	Anthimus VI	1760	1764
93	Bartholomew	1764	1771?
94	Neophytus IV	1771?	1775
(93)	Bartholomew	1775	1780
95	Gabriel II	1781?	1781?
96	Benedict	1781	1785
97	Athanasius III	1785	1787
(96)	Benedict	1787	1797?
(97)	Athanasius III	1797?	1799
98	Gregory III	1799	1820
99	Dionysius II	1820	1823

=== Modern period ===
No.	Primate	Portrait	Reign		Notes
100	Gregory IV		16 September 1827	March 1828	
101	Anthimus VII		March 1828	27 July 1833	
102	Neophytus V		2 December 1833	10 January 1862	Bishop in 1833–1850
103	Misail		13 January 1862	2 August 1862	
104	Theophilus		8 August 1862	15 July 1873	
105	Anthony		9 August 1873	15 May 1874	
106	Procopius I		8 June 1874	11 February 1889	
107	Germanus II		17 July 1889	30 January 1896	
108	Procopius II		23 October 1896	21 November 1901	
109	Theocletus I		17 November 1902	11 October 1917	1st tenure
110	Meletius III		13 March 1918	29 November 1920	
(109)	Theocletus I		29 November 1920	16 December 1922	2nd tenure
111	Chrysostomos I		8 March 1923	31 December 1923	

== Archbishops of Athens and All Greece ==
No.	Primate	Portrait	Reign		Notes
112	Chrysostomos I		31 December 1923	22 October 1938	
113	Damaskinos		5 November 1938	1 December 1938	1st tenure. Election cancelled by the regime of Ioannis Metaxas
114	Chrysanthus		12 December 1938	2 July 1941	Resigned in the aftermath of the German invasion of Greece, after refusing to swear-in the collaborationist government of Georgios Tsolakoglou
(113)	Damaskinos		2 July 1941	20 May 1949	2nd tenure
115	Spyridon		4 June 1949	21 March 1956	
116	Dorotheus (III)		29 March 1956	26 July 1957	
117	Theocletus II		7 August 1957	8 January 1962	
118	Jacob III		13 January 1962	25 January 1962	
119	Chrysostomos II		14 February 1962	11 May 1967	Forced to resign by the military regime following the coup d'état on 21 April 1967
120	Ieronymos I		14 May 1967	12 December 1973	Resigned following the Athens Polytechnic uprising and the coup d'état on 25 November 1973
121	Seraphim		12 January 1974	10 April 1998	
122	Christodoulos		28 April 1998	28 January 2008	
123	Ieronymos II		7 February 2008	Incumbent	

== See also ==
- Church of Greece
  - Archbishopric of Athens
- Catholic Church in Greece
  - Roman Catholic Archdiocese of Athens
