= Dorotheus I =

Dorotheus I may refer to:

- Dorotheus I, Greek Orthodox Patriarch of Antioch in 1219–1245
- Dorotheus of Bulgaria, Patriarch of Bulgaria in 1300–c. 1315
- Dorotheus I of Athens, Greek Orthodox metropolitan bishop of Athens from ca. 1388 to 1392
