= Ieronymos II of Athens =

Archbishop of Athens since 2008

His Beatitude Ieronymos II
- Archbishop of Athens and All Greece
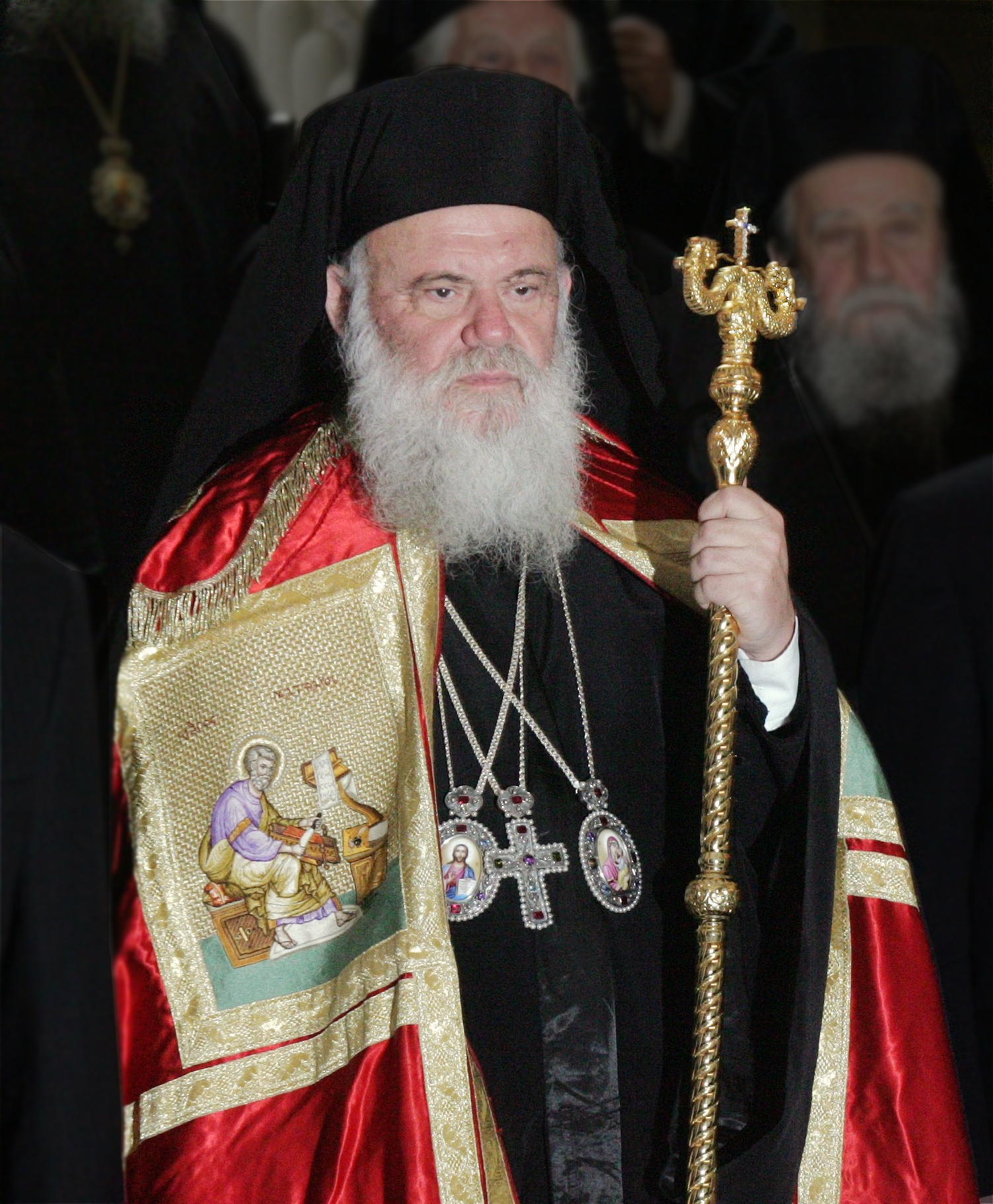
- Ieronymos II in 2008
- Native name: Ιερώνυμος B΄
- Church: Church of Greece
- See: Athens
- Installed: 7 February 2008
- Predecessor: Christodoulos
- Previous post: Metropolitan of Thebes and Levadeia (1981–2008)

Orders
- Ordination: 10 December 1967
- Consecration: 4 October 1981

Personal details
- Born: Ioannis Liapis; 30 March 1938 (age 88) Oinofyta, Greece
- Denomination: Greek Orthodoxy
- Profession: Theologian; Archaeologist
- Education: University of Athens; University of Graz; University of Regensburg; LMU Munich

Ieronymos II (Greek: Ιερώνυμος B’, romanized: Ierōnymos II, pronounced [ieˈronimos]; born 30 March 1938) is the Archbishop of Athens and All Greece, the primate of the Autocephalous Orthodox Church of Greece. He has held the position of Archbishop since his election on 7 February 2008.

== Titles ==
Styles of Archbishop Ieronymos II of Athens
- Reference style: His Beatitude
- Spoken style: Your Beatitude (Makariótate), Déspota
- Religious style: Archbishop

The official title of the Archbishop of Athens and All Greece is:

His Beatitude Ieronymos II, Archbishop of Athens and All Greece

in Greek:

Η Αυτού Μακαριότης ο Αρχιεπίσκοπος Αθηνών και Πάσης Ελλάδος Ιερώνυμος Β'

== Early life and background ==
Ieronymos was born in Oinofyta, Boeotia and is of Arvanite descent.

Ieronymos holds degrees in archaeology, Byzantine studies, and theology from the University of Athens. Additionally, he undertook postgraduate studies at the University of Graz, the University of Regensburg and LMU Munich.

Following a brief time as a lector in Christian archaeology at the Athens Archaeological Society under the guidance of Professor Anastasios Orlandos, he taught as a philologist in Lycée Léonin. Subsequently, in 1967, Ieronymos was ordained Deacon and later Presbyter in the Orthodox Church.

== Ecclesiastical affairs ==
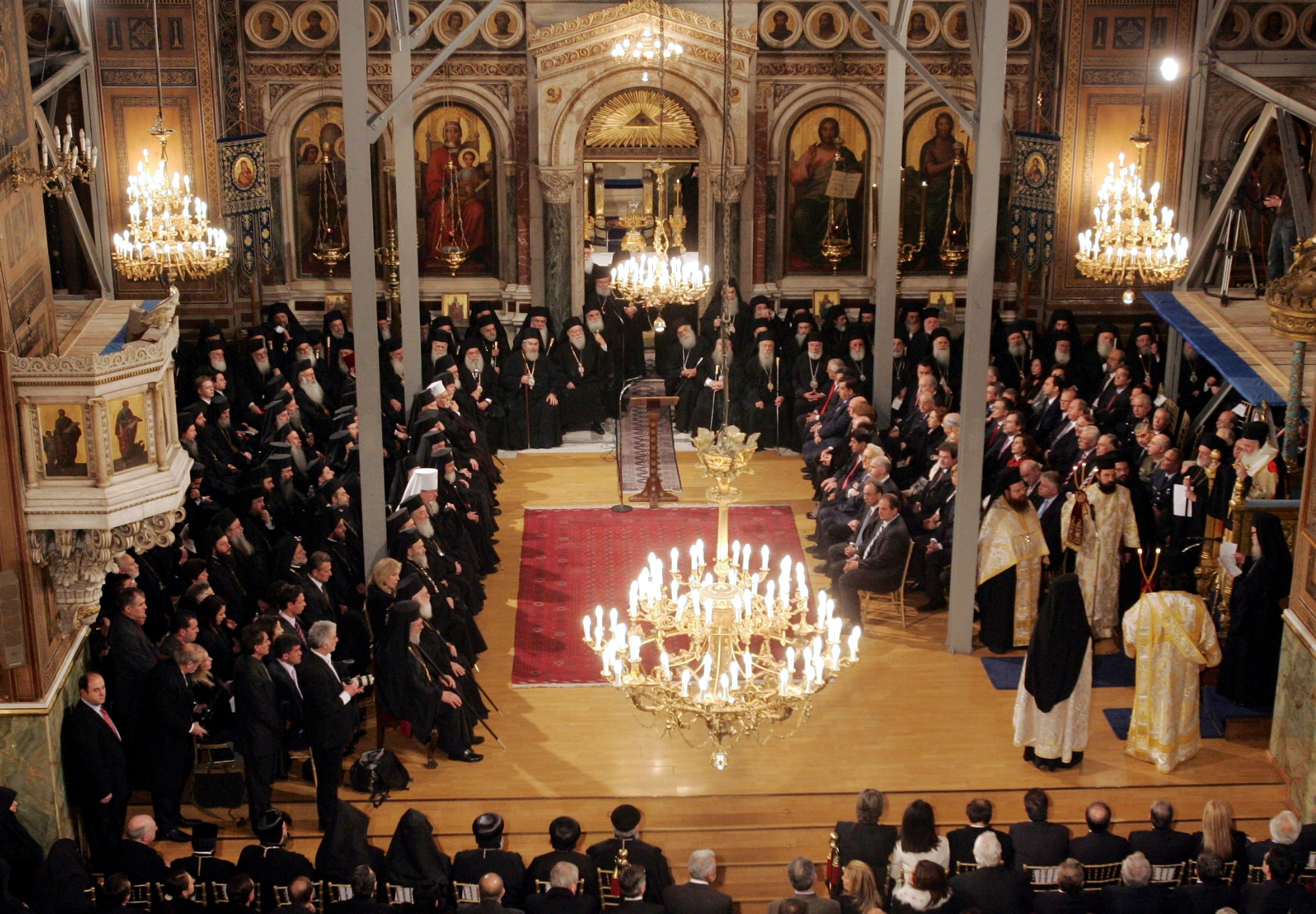
The enthronement of Ieronymos II in Metropolitan Cathedral of Athens, 2008.

Prior to his episcopal ministry, Ieronymos served in various roles, including Protosyncellus of the Metropolis of Thebes and Livadeia, abbot of the monasteries of the Transfiguration of Sagmata and Hosios Loukas, and Secretary (later Chief Secretary) of the Holy Synod of the Church of Greece. In 1981, he was elected as Metropolitan of Thebes and Levadeia. He has published two major textbooks: "Medieval Monuments of Euboea" (1970), and "Christian Boeotia" (2006).

On 7 February 2008, Ieronymos was elected the new Archbishop of Athens and All Greece by the Holy Synod of the Church of Greece, receiving 45 out of 74 votes in a traditional Orthodox episcopal election process. He was formally enthroned on 16 February 2008.

== Social and political views ==
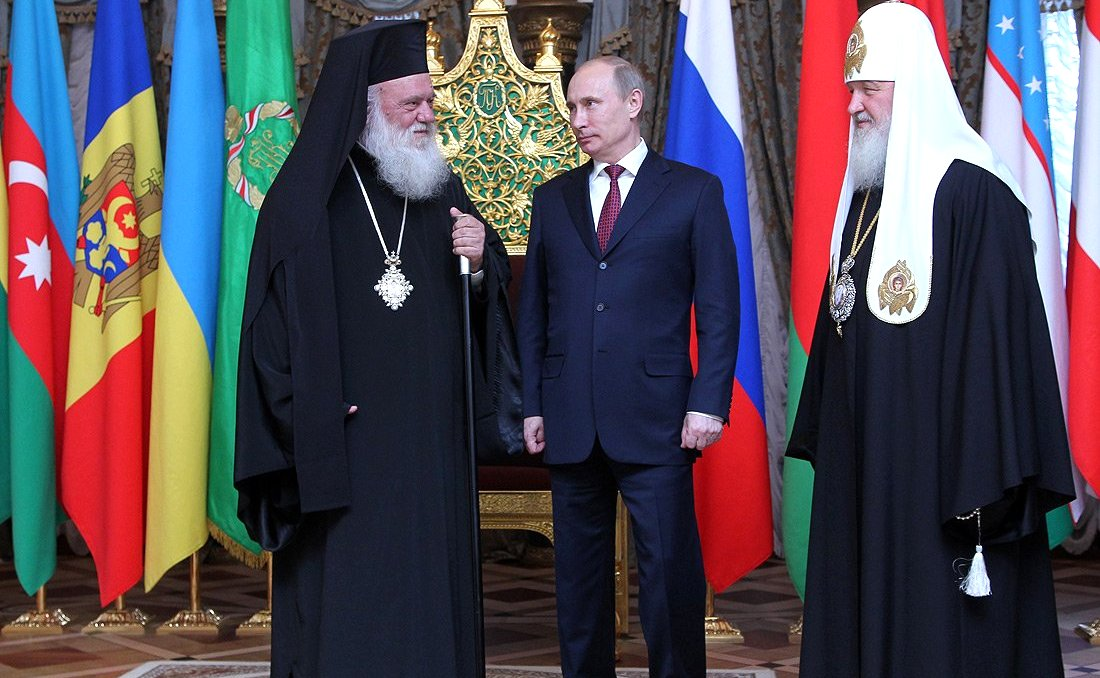
Ieronymos II with Vladimir Putin and Kirill, 2012.

In 2012, Ieronymos criticized racism, antisemitism, Islamophobia and the Golden Dawn party, saying that "The church loves all people, including those who are black, white or non-Christians."

On 16 April 2016, together with Pope Francis and Ecumenical Patriarch Bartholomew I of Constantinople, he visited the Mòria camp on the island of Lesbos, to call the attention of the world to the refugee crisis.

On 16 February 2024, when gay marriage was legalized in Greece, he condemned the new law as a "new reality that seeks only to corrupt the homeland's social cohesion."

== Notes and references ==
- Bintliff, John (2003), "The Ethnoarchaeology of a "Passive" Ethnicity: The Arvanites of Central Greece" in K.S. Brown and Yannis Hamilakis, eds., The Usable Past: Greek Metahistories, Lexington Books. ISBN 0-7391-0383-0.

Eastern Orthodox Church titles
Preceded by Christodoulos	Archbishop of Athens and All Greece; 2008–present	Incumbent
