= GVG =

GVG may refer to:

- Gray Viking Games, LLC
- Greek Volunteer Guard, a former group of Greek volunteers who fought in the Bosnian War
- Vigabatrin, by designation GVG
- Grass Valley (company), a Canadian manufacturer of television production and broadcasting equipment
