= Christodoulos of Athens =

Archbishop of Athens and All Greece (1939–2008)

His Beatitude Christodoulos
- Archbishop of Athens and All Greece
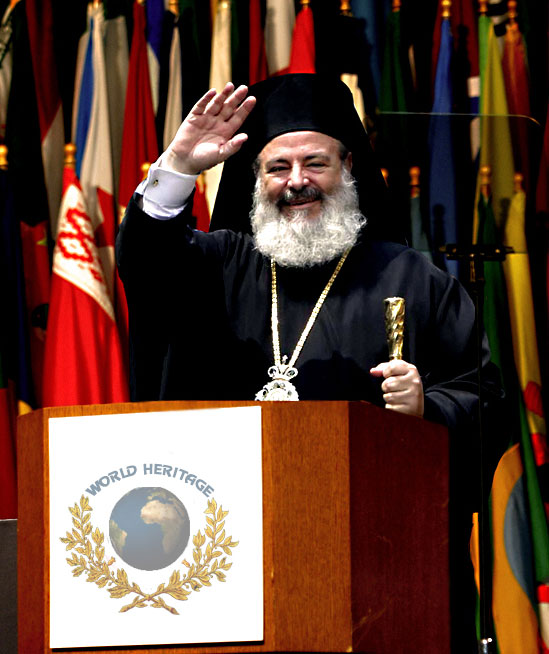
- Christodoulos in 2005
- Native name: Χριστόδουλος
- Church: Church of Greece
- See: Athens
- Installed: 28 April 1998
- Term ended: 28 January 2008†
- Predecessor: Seraphim
- Successor: Ieronymos II
- Previous post: Metropolitan of Demetrias and Almyros (1974–1998)

Orders
- Ordination: 17 May 1961
- Consecration: 14 July 1974

Personal details
- Born: Christos Paraskevaidis; 17 January 1939 Xanthi, Greece
- Died: 28 January 2008 (aged 69) Athens, Greece
- Buried: First Cemetery of Athens
- Denomination: Greek Orthodoxy
- Profession: Theologian; Jurist
- Education: University of Athens; Aristotle University of Thessaloniki

Christodoulos (17 January 1939 – 28 January 2008) (Greek: Χριστόδουλος, born Christos Paraskevaidis, Χρήστος Παρασκευαΐδης) was Archbishop of Athens and All Greece as such the primate of the Autocephalous Orthodox Church of Greece from 28 April 1998 to 28 January 2008.

== Titles ==
Styles of Archbishop Christodoulos of Athens
- Reference style: The late Archbishop Christodoulos
- Spoken style: The late Christodoulos (Makaristós),
- Religious style: Archbishop

The official title of the Archbishop of Athens and All Greece is:

The late Christodoulos, Archbishop of Athens and All Greece

in Greek:

Ο Μακαριστός Αρχιεπίσκοπος Αθηνών και Πάσης Ελλάδος Χριστόδουλος

== Early life and career ==
Christodoulos was born in Xanthi, Thrace, Northern Greece in 1939. His civil name was Christos Paraskevaidis. When he was two years old, his family moved to Athens to escape German and Bulgarian occupation of the area during World War II. His father subsequently returned to Xanthi following the war and ran a successful bid for mayor.

Christodoulos attended high school at the Roman Catholic Marist Leonteion Lyceum of Athens. He then studied law at the University of Athens, graduating in 1962, after having been ordained a deacon in the Orthodox Church in 1961.

He also attended a graduate school at the University of Athens for a degree in theology. Christodoulos was ordained a priest in 1965 and graduated from the School of Theology in 1967. He worked as a parish priest in Palaio Faliro, a suburb of Athens, between 1965 and 1974. During that time he also became Chief Secretary of the Holy Synod of the Church of Greece. In 1974, he was elected bishop of Demetrias in Volos, Thessaly, a post which he held until his election as Archbishop of Athens in 1998.

Christodoulos was a Doctor of Theology, had a degree in French and English, and also spoke Italian and German. He was the author of a number of theological books and received Honorary Doctorates from the University of Craiova and the University of Iasi. Due to Christodoulos' attending a Catholic high school, he felt open to dialogue between the Orthodox and Catholic churches having experienced both sides.

== Archbishop of Athens (1998–2008) ==
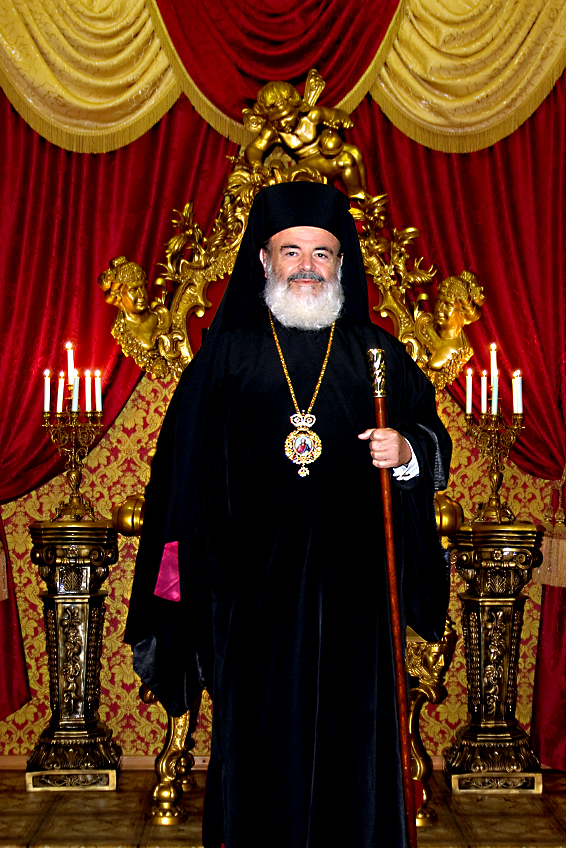
Archbishop Christodoulos, 2006.

Christodoulos succeeded Archbishop Seraphim to the seat of the Prelate of the Greek church in 1998. At 59 years of age, he was the youngest Archbishop to head the Greek Church. His chief rivals in ballot were Metropolitan Anthimos of Alexandroupolis and Metropolitan Ieronymos of Thebes. The latter would eventually succeed him in 2008.

Supporting the existing Church social services, he launched new services to face social issues such as the welfare of drug addicts and immigrants, the support for single mothers and abused women, the care for the victims of trafficking, the establishing of a chain of nurseries and infant schools, the provided assistance to poor families and families with many children. He also established "Solidarity", an NGO of the Church of Greece, which allowed a humanitarian intervention of the Church on an international level in the Middle East, Africa, Asia, and Eastern Europe. "Solidarity" caused several controversies, such as the case where it received 5.6 million Euros from the Greek State in order to send humanitarian relief to Iraq. Instead, "Solidarity" only spent 740 thousand Euros to buy food, which it kept in storage houses without ever sending it to Iraq, and kept the rest in a bank account. After the death of Archbishop Christodoulos, the Greek Church started an investigation of the financial activities of "Solidarity" and found gross irregularities.

In 2003, he fell out with Ecumenical Patriarch Bartholomew over who should have the final say in the appointment of bishops in northern Greece. As a result, Christodoulos' name was stricken off the Diptych of the Church as a punishment. He was reinstated three months later, as the conflict seemed to be coming to a resolution. The rift was mended a month later.

The visit of Pope John Paul II in Athens and Archbishop Christodoulos' visit to Pope Benedict XVI in Rome were significant steps towards the cause of Church unity.

On May 20, 2001, Konstantinos Poulios (Κωνσταντίνος Πούλιος in Greek), an Old Calendarist, attacked Christodoulos and slapped him in the face, while the Archbishop was giving an interview to a TV crew outside the Metropolitan Cathedral of Athens. The attack was broadcast on live television; Poulios was arrested by Christodoulos' police bodyguards, but in the end he faced no charges.

== Views ==
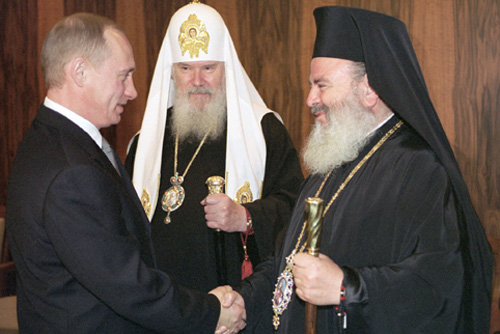
Christodoulos with Vladimir Putin, 2001.

=== Support for Serbia ===
The Archbishop played a leading role in supporting Serbia (a mainly Orthodox country), and stoking public opposition to NATO and the Kosovo War of 1999 in which Greece, as a NATO member, played a significant, though largely non-interventionist, role. He also spoke out strongly against the intention of the Greek government under Costas Simitis to follow EU directives, especially where they clashed with what he regarded as traditional Greek policies. Shortly after his swearing in, Christodoulos stated that it was "a disgrace for the modern Greeks to decide on the basis of what directives from Brussels might ask, at one time or another.

=== Identity cards controversy ===
In 2000, a major clash between church and state erupted when the then Greek socialist government sought to follow a decision of the Greek Data Protection Authority, by removing the "Religion" field from the national ID cards carried by Greek citizens. Christodoulos opposed the decision, complaining that socialist prime minister Costas Simitis did not consult with the Greek Church on the matter and saying that it was part of a wider plan to marginalise the Church from Greek public life; he also stated that the decision was "put forward by neo-intellectuals who want to attack us like rabid dogs and tear at our flesh". The archbishop organised two demonstrations in Athens and Thessaloniki, alongside a majority of bishops of the Church of Greece, supporting the inclusion of religious data on a voluntary basis, and asked for a referendum on the matter. For this purpose, he was greatly supported as more than three million Greek citizens signed and asked for a referendum.

In 2001, Christodoulos prompted international criticism after saying that the ID decision had been instigated by Jews. The Central Board of the Jewish Community in Greece subsequently sent him a letter on 20 March 2001, asking him to clarify the matter and expressing their opposition to the mandatory writing of religious status in identity cards. The Archbishop replied in a letter that his source was the official web site of the USA Jewish Community where it was stated that the US Jewish Community had asked the Greek Government to remove religious status from Greek identity cards. He also said that in Israel, the writing of religious status in identity cards is mandatory. The official position of the Greek Church became that the writing of religious status on identity cards should be optional. However, the Greek Government proceeded to remove the writing of religious status completely from new identity cards.

=== Military junta ===
It emerged the same year that despite Christodoulos' saying that he had no knowledge of nor involvement with human rights violations by the Greek military junta of 1967-1974, because those seven years he was busy studying to become a priest, he had been present in the swearing-in ceremony of the new regime while he held the office of Arch-Secretary of the "Holy Synod", the collective council of Metropolitan bishops of the Church of Greece. At the same time, he was serving as chief advisor to Archbishop Hieronymus, a regime appointee and supporter.

=== Ecumenical relations ===
Christodoulos consented in 2001 to the Greek government's decision to allow Pope John Paul II to visit Greece. He commented that he would not "close the door" on the Pope, because he was coming to the country as a pilgrim. The two men met for discussions during the Papal visit in May 2001, though they did not pray together. After a private 30-minute meeting, the two spoke publicly. Christodoulos read a list of "13 offences" of the Catholic Church against the Eastern Orthodox Church since the Great Schism, including the pillaging of Constantinople by crusaders in 1204, and bemoaned the lack of apology from the Catholic Church, saying "Until now, there has not been heard a single request for pardon" for the "maniacal crusaders of the 13th century".The pope responded by saying "For the occasions past and present, when sons and daughters of the Catholic Church have sinned by action or omission against their Orthodox brothers and sisters, may the Lord grant us forgiveness", to which Christodoulos immediately applauded. John Paul II said that the sacking of Constantinople was a source of "profound regret" for Catholics. Later John Paul II and Christodoulos met on a spot where Paul of Tarsus had once preached to Athenian Christians. They issued a common declaration saying, "We shall do everything in our power, so that the Christian roots of Europe and its Christian soul may be preserved.... We condemn all recourse to violence, proselytism and fanaticism, in the name of religion." The two leaders then said the Lord's Prayer together, breaking an Orthodox taboo against praying with Catholics. Christodoulos' decision led to major controversy in Greece, where many Orthodox Christians regard the Pope (and the Catholic Church as a whole) as a schismatic heretic. He also consented in 2002 to the construction of a mosque in Athens, to end the fact that Athens is the only EU capital without a Muslim place of worship. On the other hand, he asked that the mosque will be outside the city center, a wish that was granted by the government who chose a site 20 km outside Athens against the wishes of the Muslim community.

Archbishop Christodoulos visited Pope Benedict XVI in Rome in 2006. They issued a common proclamation together that included the statement that: "We look forward to a fruitful collaboration to enable our contemporaries to rediscover the Christian roots of the European Continent which forged the different nations and contributed to developing increasingly harmonious links between them. This will help them live and promote the fundamental human and spiritual values for all people, as well as the development of their own societies"

=== Role of the clergy in Greek schools ===
In 2006, Greek newspapers reported the Archbishop's displeasure at a decision by the centre-right government of New Democracy under Kostas Karamanlis to discontinue the practice of allowing Greek Orthodox priests to use public schools for confessionary purposes, that is to hear student's confessions on a voluntary basis. The vast majority of students in Greek public schools were practising Orthodox and the Archbishop was concerned for their access to the Sacraments and their spiritual welfare. Until then, calling in priests to hold private confession sessions within schools, was at the discretion of local educational authorities; these opportunities for the Sacrament of Confession took place on a voluntary basis for young Greeks in high school and primary school. Greek media reported that the Archbishop characterised the move a "hostile act" against the Church, while the Synod of the Greek Orthodox Church, presided by Christodoulos, sent a letter of complaint to the Ministry for National Education and Religious Affairs under Marietta Giannakou. The decision, however, was applauded by representatives of the Greek Teachers' Association, who supported it as a measure that safeguarded freedom of belief and fostered respect for cultural and religious differences in schools.

=== Greek politics ===
Christodoulos supported views on Greek politics and culture that were criticized by The New York Times, an American newspaper, as conservative and nationalist and supported by others as "standing up" for Greece and Greek culture. He led protests in 2002 against Greece's version of the television programme Big Brother, urging followers to "pray for the young kids" on the shows and to "turn off our television sets".

=== Greek history ===
The Archbishop attacked the authors of the Greek elementary schools' official state sixth-grade history book, accusing them of attempting to "enslave Greek youth" and conceal the Church's role in defending Greek national identity during Ottoman occupation. In reference to the same issue, he has castigated the "yannisaries" (i.e. traitors to the Greek nation) "who dare raise an audacious head and question unimpeachable things". The state issued textbook was later removed in 2007 by the Greek Government, after the Athens Academy, a Legal Entity of Public Law supervised by the Ministry of National Education and Religion, as well as a number of Greek historians and intellectuals also criticised the book for historical inaccuracies.

=== Globalization ===
The Archbishop was intensely critical of globalisation, to which he referred, on repeated occasions, in disparaging terms as a global, or alternatively, "foreigner" plot to deprive people of their national identities. In 2004 he criticized globalisation as a "bulldozer that is out to demolish everything, on account of those who want to rule the world without resistance or obstacles", adding that Greeks live in a paradise compared to other Europeans, because "they have a strong faith, they build churches, follow traditions, and resist globalisation". In 2006, he castigated globalisation as a "crime against humanity" and "a vehicle to Americanise the life of all humankind". He has also said that "globalisation wants to turn us into gruel, soup, sheep, or better yet, turkeys, so that we may be led with a cane".

In 2002, he asked students in a Greek school whether they wanted to be "mince meat or meat", explaining that "foreigners want to turn us into the meat-grinder, while meat is a solid thing". On another occasion he stated that "the forces of Darkness cannot stand it [that Greece is a predominantly Orthodox country], and for this reason they want to decapitate it and flatten everything, by means of globalization, the novel deity that has appeared alongside another deity called human rights, and on account of which they expect us to curtail our own rights". In 2006, he decried the establishment of the monotonic orthography, as a "globalization plot" to impose "cultural uniformity" and "support the sale of multi-national Olivetti's typewriters". He also sarcastically referred to the lawmakers' "kindness of relieving our race from the darkness of Aristophanes", with regards to the same matter.

=== Human rights ===
Some comments by the archbishop on human rights also raised controversy. During a 2006 speech, Christodoulos stated that the Church is bound to "come into many conflicts with the movement for human rights", despite the fact "it not only does not oppose human rights, but supersedes them". His proposed reason for these conflicts is that "the Church cannot accept what the Lord of This World is promoting through the human rights movement : the abolishment of sin". The Archbishop has attributed human rights to a ploy by Satan on a second occasion, stating that "the forces of Darkness cannot stand it [that Greece is a predominantly Orthodox country], and for this reason they want to decapitate it and flatten everything, by means of globalization, the novel deity that has appeared alongside another deity called human rights, and on account of which they expect us to curtail our own rights".

The Archbishop was also criticised for frequently judging the internal and foreign policies of the elected Greek governments, usually during sermons in the liturgy. In 1999, he complained during a sermon that the Education Ministries were "experimenting on students" with their continuous innovations on the educational system, causing the dissatisfaction of then Minister Gerasimos Arsenis, who was pushing substantial changes in secondary education at the time.

=== Enlightenment philosophy ===
Christodoulos frequently criticized the principles and values of what he characterized "the atheist Enlightenment", and which he contrasted to Christian values.

=== Turkey and the European Union ===
Christodoulos created a major controversy in 2003 when he denounced proposals to let Turkey enter the European Union, calling the Turks "barbarians". Despite the fact a number of Greeks are also opposed to Turkey's entrance (as, indeed, are many other Europeans), Christodoulos' statements were seen as an unwarranted intervention in foreign affairs, based on a discriminatory and racialist logic. Statements to the same effect had been made—and retracted—in the past by former Foreign Affairs Minister Theodoros Pangalos.

The Archbishop was accused of fusing ethnic stereotypes and homophobic ideas when, on another occasion, he proclaimed that "Because we are not German, neither French, far more not English, but manful Greeks, we are Orthodox Christians".

=== Relations between Greece and Europe ===
In 1998 he declared that "when our ancestors gave the lights of civilization, they [Europeans] were living up in trees". In 2003 he said that "history teaches us Europeans were always out to harm us. Long before the sack of Constantinople, Hellenism had been subjected to the horrible experience of the Franks, who wanted to achieve, by any means possible, its extinction." The latter sentence seems to indicate that the Archbishop extrapolates attitudes of the excommunicated Western sackers of 1204 AD, to all Western Europeans, of all times.

=== September 11 attacks ===
After the September 11 attacks on the World Trade Center in 2001, parts of the public were shocked to hear the Archbishop attribute the attacks to "despondent men" who acted "out of despair caused by the injustices of the Great Powers". Critics attacked the Archbishop for what they considered to constitute an underhanded justification of the terrorist act. Christodoulos denied the allegation and responded that he condemned the attacks. In the fifth anniversary of the attacks, in 2006, and while speaking to an audience of High School students, Christodoulos characterized the September 11, 2001 attacks "a hideous crime that cost the lives of thousands of innocent people" and attributed them to "man failing to discern between good and evil, and being unable to posit himself responsibly towards the problems of the world".

=== Science ===
In 2004, Christodoulos published a brief article in, Efimerios, the journal of the Holy Synod of the Greek Church. This does not count as an official church document but does give a rare testimony about the official position of the Holy Synod.

"All of us have once heard that "God has created the world ex-nihilo." This is for some people a problem. Not all are ready to accept this answer to the question, "how has the world been created?" The problem of who has created and how he has created the world is a central problem of our life. We all know the great progress that science has done in this domain. Many sciences complete each other in a common effort to discover the principles of life. We are grateful to science for its efforts to reach the limits of knowledge and throw light in all the secrets of creation. We, believers, should not fear the progress of science; on the contrary, we should expect conclusions and proposals from it which strengthen our faith. Nevertheless, we do not ignore that in the past, and precisely in the preceding century, the distrust of scripture came from certain laboratories and lasted a long time. It was the period of the myth that science is omnipotent and can give answers to the main human queries... Then, when one believes in the omnipotence of man on earth, comes accidents such as Challenger or Soviet Chernobyl to demonstrate the weakness of man... Science is a holy gift, but within limits. It stands in between physics and metaphysics. With the means of observation, experiment and mathematics, it tries to explore events that cannot be perceived. But its horizon is always limited. Nevertheless the query for atheist arguments in scientific results has not ceased even today to be a phenomenon, not of course in science laboratories, but in the imagination of some people who pretend that science has the status and authority to decide on whether God exists or not."

== Chrysopigi ==
In 1958 along with Kallinkos Karusos and Athanasios, Christodoulos established the religious fraternity Panagia Chrysopigi. In 1973 via a royal edict, Christodoulos managed to lodge the fraternity of Chrysipigi on prime land just outside Athens. The edict also gave authority of the monastery, not to the local bishop, but to the Holy Synod itself.

== Illness ==
In June 2007, Archbishop Christodoulos was hospitalised in Aretaeion Hospital in Athens and diagnosed with colonic adenocarcinoma, and hepatocellular carcinoma in the right lobe of his liver.

Following colonic tumor resection, transplantation specialist Andreas Tzakis of the University of Miami's Miller School of Medicine announced that the archbishop would be transferred to Jackson Memorial Hospital in Miami to undergo a liver transplant.

While in Miami, His Beatitude received faithful Orthodox Christians and bestowed many blessings. This included at least one sacramental service of blessings of rings and betrothal for a wedding on August 21, 2007.

On October 8, 2007, however, the transplant was cancelled because of metastases and, following suggestions from his attending physicians, Christodoulos returned to Athens on October 26 for continued medical treatment.

== Death and burial ==
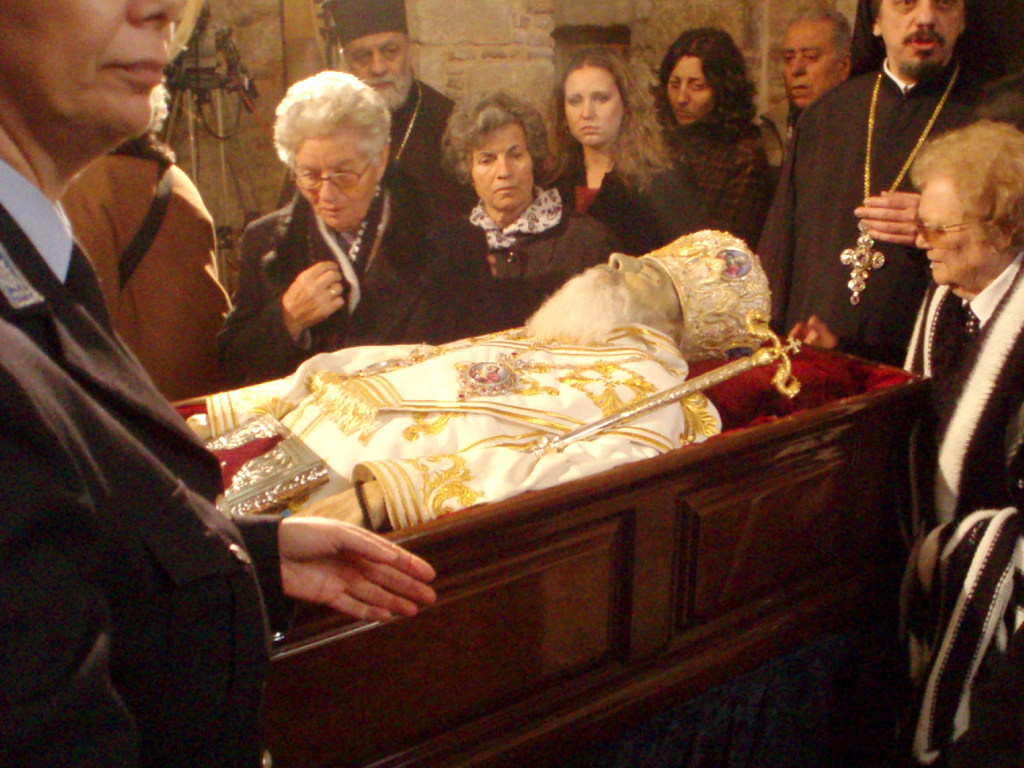
People paying their last respects to Archbishop Christodoulos.

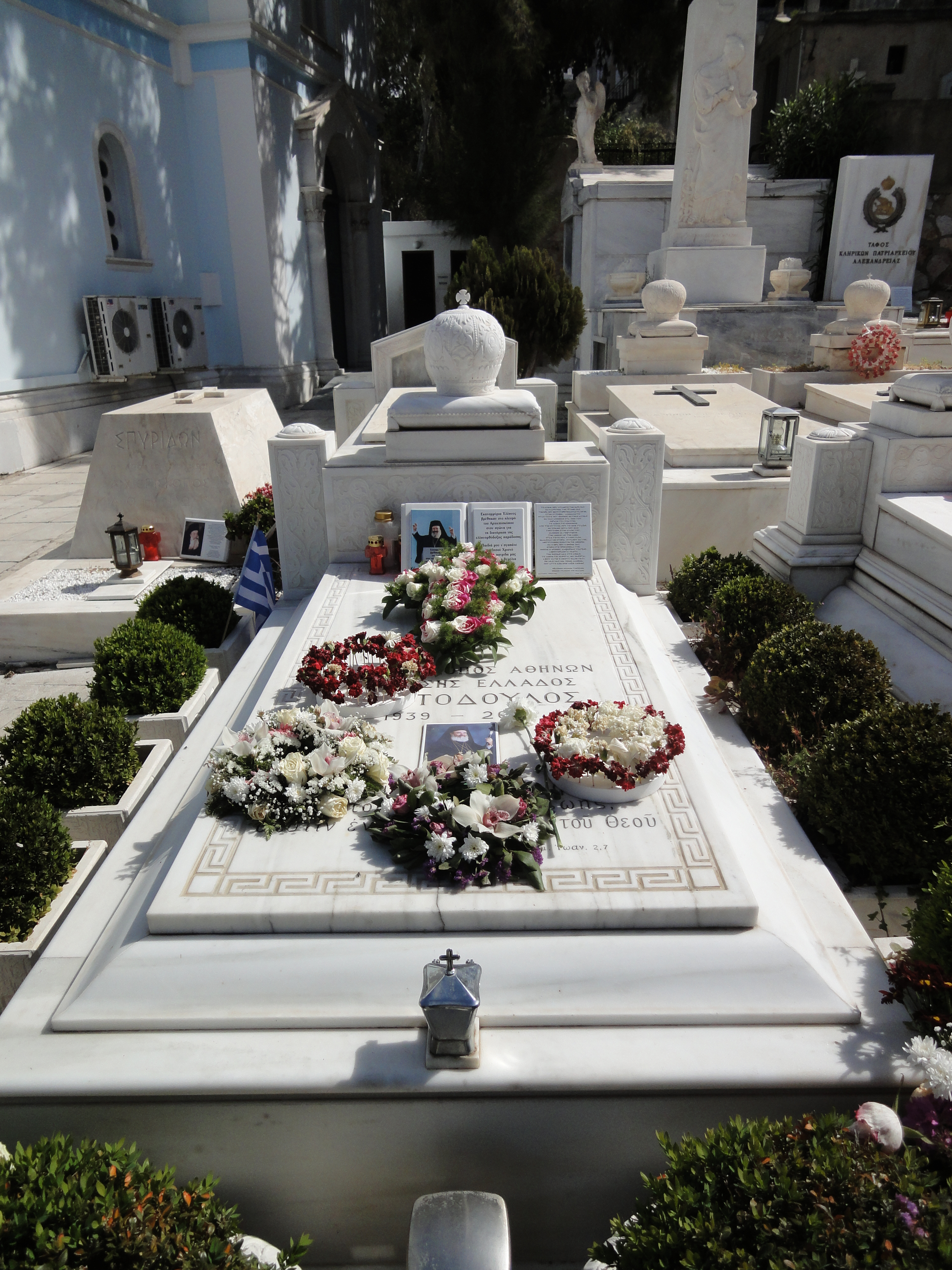
Christodoulos's tombstone at the First Cemetery of Athens.

In his final days, the Archbishop refused to be hospitalised, preferring to remain at his home in Psychiko, where he died on 28 January 2008, one week and four days after his 69th birthday. After his death the Greek government announced a four-day national wake during which his body lay in state at the chapel of the Cathedral of the Annunciation.

His funeral was held on 31 January 2008. It was presided over by the Ecumenical Patriarch Bartholomew I, Patriarch Theophilos III of Jerusalem, Patriarch Theodore II of Alexandria, Patriarch Daniel of Romania, and was also attended by the Archbishop of Cyprus Chrysostomos II and the Archbishop of America Demetrios. The election of his successor was carried out by the Synod of the Metropolitans of the Church of Greece on 7 February 2008.

Despite the criticism, Archbishop Christodoulos proved to be one of the most popular archbishops in Greek history, having a particular rapport with young people.

== Quotes ==
- The Archbishop has been taped saying, referring to the Justinian era of Christianity: Early Greek Christians blessed and honored the Ancient Greek temples, in which pagans and heathens dwelled, by recycling the materials (stones and dirt) from the Ancient Greek Temples to build Christian temples.

== See also ==
- List of Archbishops of Athens

== Notes and references ==
Eastern Orthodox Church titles
Preceded by Seraphim	Archbishop of Athens and All Greece; 1998–2008	Succeeded by Ieronymos II
