= Spyridon of Athens =

Eastern Orthodox archbishop

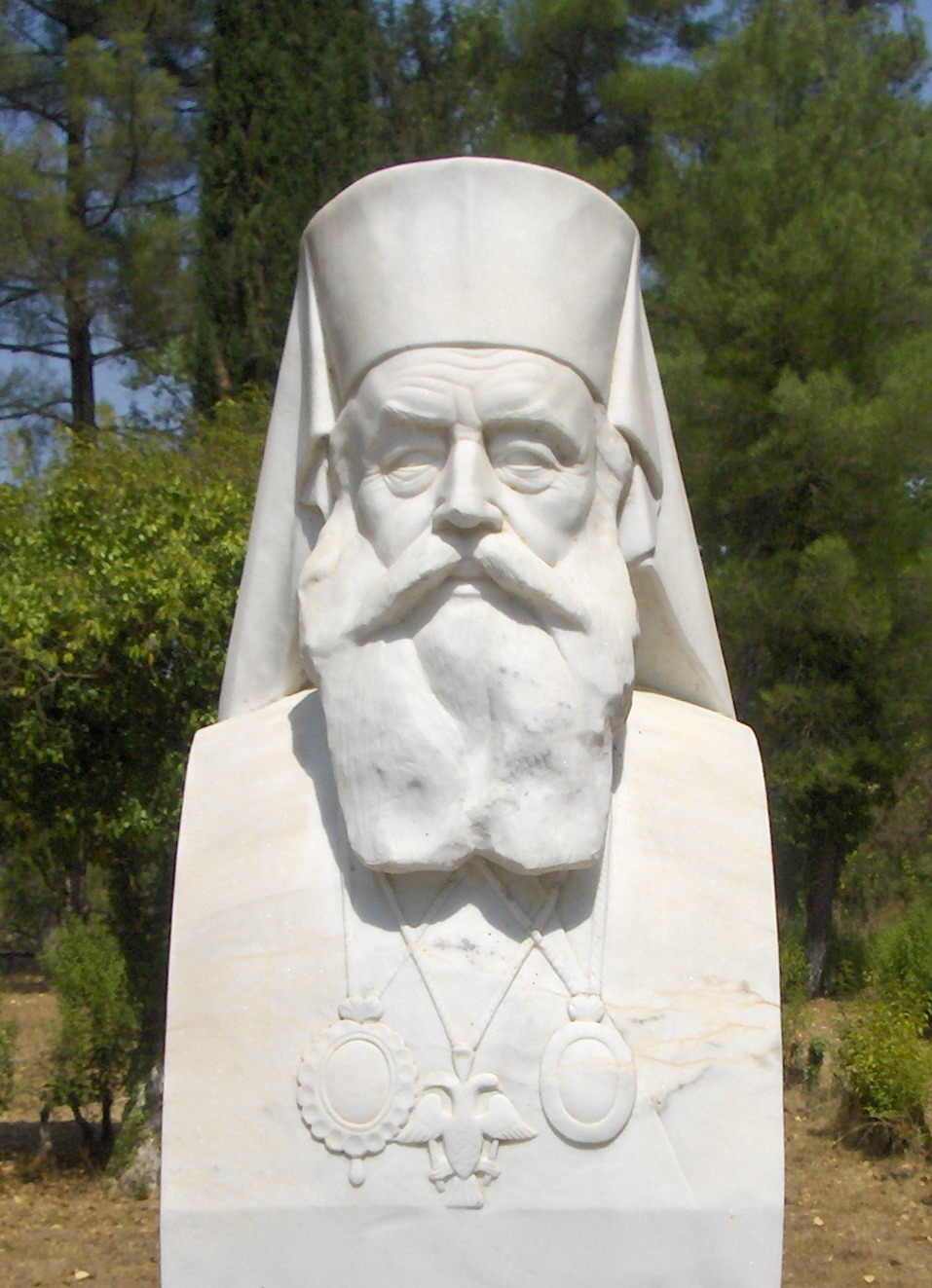
Bust of Spyridon in Ioannina

Spyridon (secular name: Σπυρίδων Βλάχος Spyridon Vlachos) was Archbishop of Athens and All Greece from 1949 until 1956. He was born in Chili (Χήλη), in what is now northern Turkey. His parents originated from the village of Roupsia, near Pogoni in northern Greece. He studied at the Halki seminary. As a senior preacher in Kavala, he offered moral and material support to the Struggle for Macedonia, and in 1906, he was elected Metropolitan Bishop of Vella and Konitsa. His services during the Balkan Wars and on the matter of Northern Epirus were significant. In the Vella Monastery, he founded a seminary based on a primary school.

In 1916, he was elected Metropolitan of Ioannina and in 1949 was elected Archbishop of Athens and All Greece. He worked to reorganize the church after the Second World War and the Greek Civil War.

In 1950 he led the call in Greece for enosis, the union of Cyprus with Greece. He actively participated in the war in Cyprus, and was succeeded by Makarios, later Archbishop of Cyprus.

He died in 1956 and was succeeded by Archbishop Dorotheus.

Eastern Orthodox Church titles
Preceded by Damaskinos	Archbishop of Athens and All Greece; 1949 – 1956	Succeeded by Dorotheus
