= Dorotheus of Athens =

Greek Orthodox Archbishop of Athens and All Greece (1888–1957)

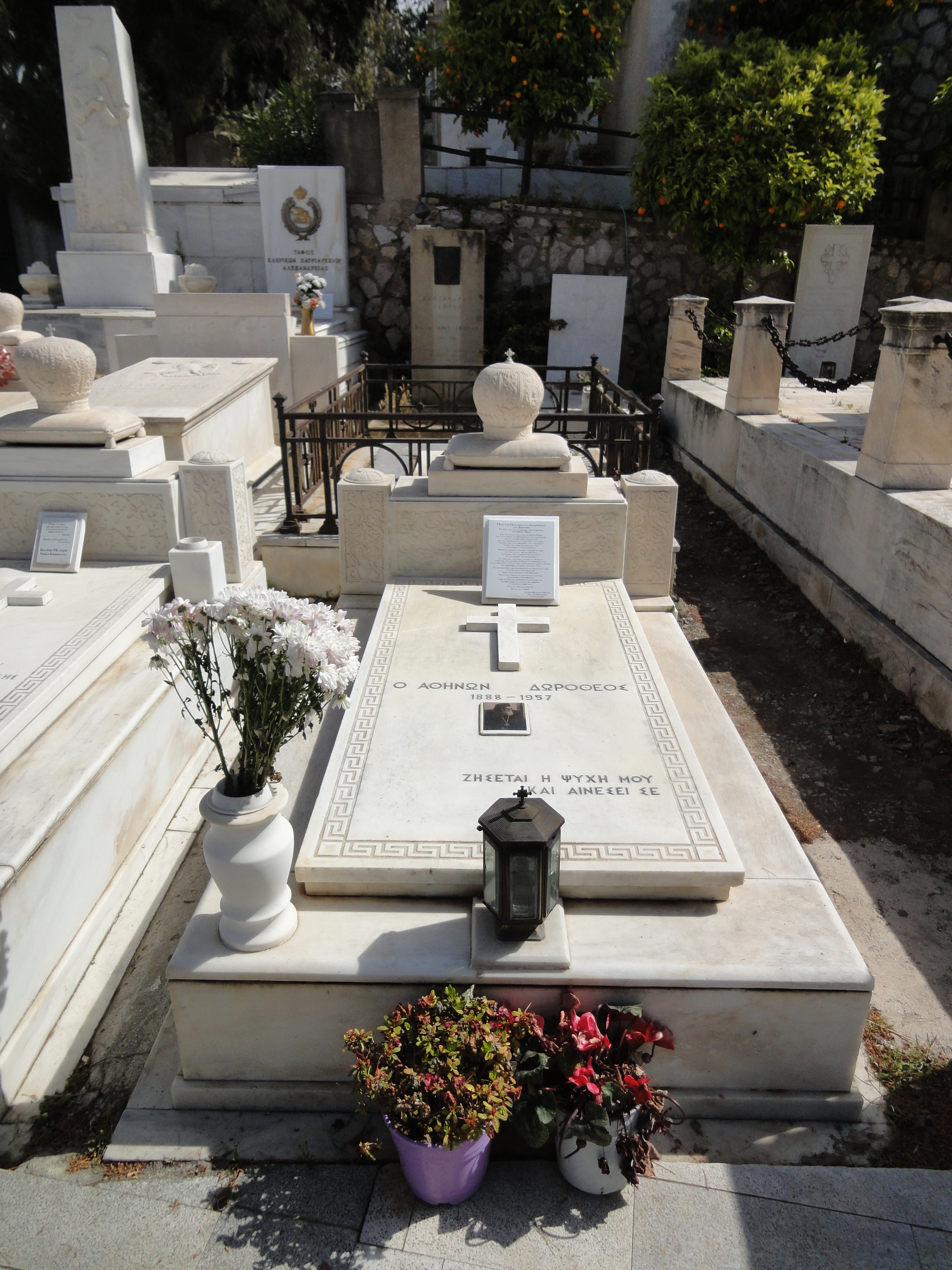
Grave of Dorotheus of Athens

Dorotheus (Greek: Δωρόθεος, secular name Ioannis Kottaras Greek: Ιωάννης Κοτταράς) was Archbishop of Athens and All Greece from 1956 to 1957. He was born in Hydra in 1888 and studied theology at the University of Athens, from where he graduated in 1909. He then studied law at the Universities of Athens and Leipzig, and specialised in ecclesiastical law. For a brief period, he was a schoolteacher in Sparta.

He became a monk, and was ordained a deacon on 18 September 1910 by Ioasaph, the Metropolitan Bishop of Hydra and Spetses, and served as a deacon for nine years in the Church of St George Carytses in Athens. On 18 December 1922 he was ordained a priest by Procopius, the Metropolitan Bishop of Hydra and Spetses. Two days later, he was ordained a bishop by the Metropolitan Bishops of Fthiotida, Ambrosius and Syros Athanasius, and was appointed Metropolitan Bishop of Kythera and Antikythera.

On 15 January 1935 he was transferred to the Metropolis of Larissa and Platamon from where he was appointed Archbishop of Athens and All Greece on 29 March 1956, succeeding Archbishop Spyridon.

Dorotheus went to London to meet with Giorgos Seferis, the poet-diplomat then serving as Greek ambassador to the United Kingdom, on 13 June 1957. After the meeting, Dorotheus commented that he felt unwell. He was admitted to a hospital on 22 June, at which point he was diagnosed with a brain tumor. He died in a Stockholm clinic on 26 July 1957; his death was announced in Athens by telegram. Konstantinos Karamanlis, then Prime Minister of Greece, responded to the new of Dorotheus's death by saying "The Church has prematurely lost a wise, humble and hardworking hierarch, one whom it sorely needed in these difficult times for the nation." During his life, he wrote over forty treatises on ecclesiastical law.

Eastern Orthodox Church titles
Preceded by Spyridon	Archbishop of Athens and All Greece; 1956 – 1957	Succeeded by Theocletus II
