= Greek Volunteer Guard =

Military unit of the Army of the Republika Srpska during the Bosnian War

- Грчка Добровољачка Гарда; Ελληνική Εθελοντική Φρουρά
- Insignia of the Greek Volunteer Guard.
- Active: 1993–1995
- Allegiance: Republika Srpska
- Branch: Army of Republika Srpska
- Type: Infantry
- Size: ~100
- Garrison/HQ: Vlasenica
- Engagements: Bosnian War; Siege of Goražde; Siege of Srebrenica; Operation Krivaja '95

The Greek Volunteer Guard (Serbian: Грчка Добровољачка Гарда, romanized: Grčka Dobrovoljačka Garda; Greek: Ελληνική Εθελοντική Φρουρά, romanized: Elliniki Ethelodiki Froura) was a unit of Greek volunteers that fought in the Bosnian War on the side of the Army of the Republika Srpska. Some members of the unit are alleged to have been present in the area of the Srebrenica massacre and reportedly hoisted a Greek flag over the town, which was recorded 'for marketing purposes'.

== History ==
The first detachment of Greek volunteers in Bosnia arrived in 1993. In March 1995, the Greek Volunteer Guard (ΕΕΦ), a contingent of one hundred Greek paramilitaries formed at the request of the Chief of Staff of the Bosnian Serb Army Ratko Mladić, became a regular fighting unit of the Drina Corps with its own insignia, a white double-headed eagle on a black background. The unit, led by Serb officers, was based in Vlasenica, a town in the Drina Valley.

Some of the volunteers allegedly had links with Golden Dawn (Χρυσή Αυγή), a Greek nationalist political party. They were allegedly motivated to support their Orthodox brothers in battle.

Archbishop Seraphim of Athens invited Bosnian Serb leader Radovan Karadžić to visit Athens in 1993. At a rally there, Karadžić proclaimed: "We have only God and the Greeks on our side."

== Presence at Srebrenica in July 1995 ==
In 2002 the Dutch NIOD report on Srebrenica described how the Greek Volunteer Guard, had hoisted the Greek flag over Srebrenica after the town's fall, citing video footage of the event and excerpts from intercepted Bosnian Serb army telephone communications that included Gen. Ratko Mladić's specific request for the Greek flag to be hoisted over the town to honour "the brave Greeks fighting on our side." The Report also revealed that the Greek government had sent shipments of light arms and ammunition to the Bosnian Serb army between 1994 and 1995.

According to a report by Agence France Presse (AFP), a dozen Greek volunteers were fighting alongside Serb forces at the time of the Srebrenica massacre. The GVG's involvement in the attack on Srebrenica was reported in the Greek media and several volunteers were interviewed there.

== Unholy Alliance and The Greek Way ==
In his book Unholy Alliance, published in 2002, the Greek author Takis Michas referred to the claim reported by the Sarajevo weekly review Global that a dozen Greek paramilitaries had been present in the area of the Srebrenica massacre and had raised the Greek flag over the town, reproducing pictures of the volunteers published in the Greek press. Michas also said that Radovan Karadžić had subsequently decorated the volunteers. In September 1995, four of the unit's fighters were awarded the Order of White Eagle by Karadžić.

In the Ingeborg Beugel's documentary "The Greek way" by Dutch public broadcaster IKON, which investigated Greek solidarity with Serbia in the Bosnian war, a director of the semi-official Athens News Agency, Nikolas Voulelis, admitted to widespread censorship in the Greek media, "Editorial interference was a given." said Voulelis.

=== Lawsuit against Takis Michas ===
In 2009, Stavros Vitalis, a representative of the Greek volunteers, announced that he was suing Michas over allegations in his book Unholy Alliance. Vitalis maintained that the volunteers were members of the Bosnian Serb army who had taken part in what he described as the town's "re-occupation". In his press statement he acknowledged that "I was present with a group of senior Serb officers in all the operations for the re-occupation of Srebrenica by the Serbs". This was despite Vitalis having told the journalist Barnaby Phillips that, although in Bosnia, he was not at Srebrenica when it fell to the Serbs.

Vitalis also claimed that Greek volunteers travelled to the conflict area with the knowledge of senior Greek politicians. Michas focused on inaction : "No-one tried to stop them and the Greek legal authorities made no attempt to assist the work of the International Criminal Tribunal for the former Yugoslavia at The Hague by pursuing inquiries about crimes the volunteers may have committed themselves or known about".

The suit against Michas was funded by an umbrella group of right-wing Greek nationalists.

The campaigning organisation Reporters Sans Frontieres urged the Greek court to dismiss the legal action, which it described as "surreal" and a clear case of judicial harassment. Referring to the quality, thoroughness, and courage of Michas's reporting of the Greek "volunteers"'military support to the Bosnian Serbs, and successive Greek governments' reluctance to investigate the issue, the organisation found the "self-censorship" of the Greek political class and media about the presence of any Greek paramilitaries or mercenaries forces in Bosnia and Herzegovina during the Srebrenica massacre, "surprising and disturbing". Reporters Sans Frontieres called for further examination of the role of the Greek authorities.

On 17 September, shortly before the court hearing was due to commence, Vitalis withdrew from the action.

== Public inquiry ==
In 2005, Greek deputy Andreas Andrianopoulos called for an investigation. On 10 July 2005, 163 Greek academics, politicians, journalists and political activists issued a call for Greece to officially apologise to the victims of Srebrenica for any Greek presence in the area of the massacre. After asserting that the Greek public had been "misinformed" about the alliance with the Bosnian Serb forces, their statement called for the Greek state to apologise publicly to the families of the victims, to indict the Greek 'volunteers' who had been present in Bosnia alongside Karadzic and Mladic and who had dishonoured the Greek flag by raising it over the carnage at Srebrenica, and to pursue the 'supposedly unknown' people who had manipulated them.

In 2006, the Minister of Justice, Anastasios Papaligouras, commissioned an inquiry and in 2011, a judge said there was not enough evidence to proceed.

== Volunteer response to allegations ==
In 2007 in the paper Eleftheri ora, Kyriakos Katharios, a member of the Greek Volunteer Guard, denied that they had participated in the massacre. While acknowledging the raising of the Greek flag, he stated that the honours received from Mladić were not linked to the incident. In an interview with Al-Jazeera Katharios claimed that he had been telephoned at home by fellow volunteers who told him that they had raised the flag but had not taken part in the battle itself.
