= Seraphim of Athens =

Archbishop of Athens from 1974 to 1998

His Beatitude Seraphim
- Archbishop of Athens and All Greece
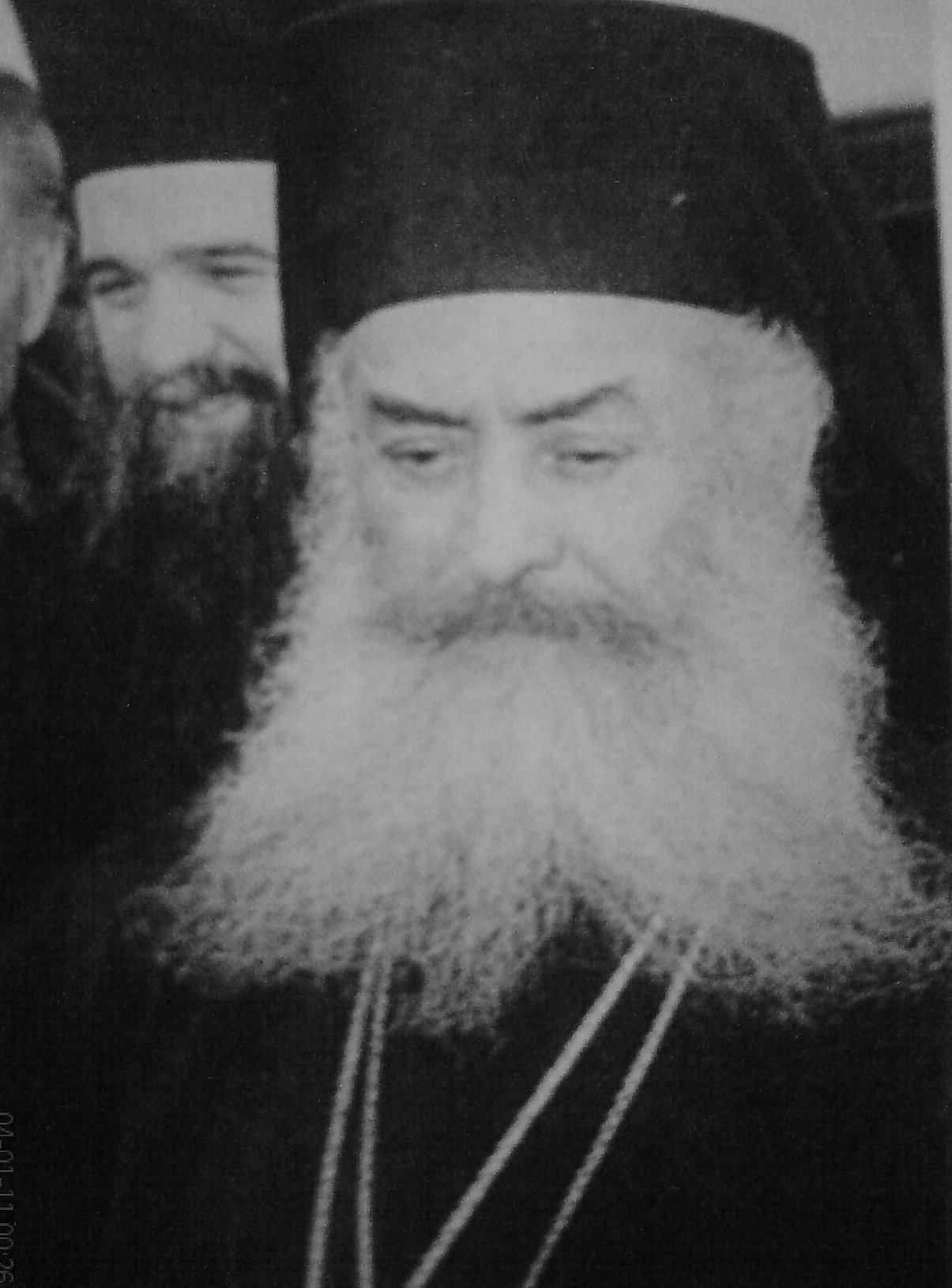
- Seraphim in 1975
- Native name: Σεραφείμ
- Church: Church of Greece
- See: Athens
- Installed: 13 January 1974
- Term ended: 10 April 1998†
- Predecessor: Ieronymos I
- Successor: Christodoulos
- Previous posts: Metropolitan of Ioannina (1958–1974); Metropolitan of Arta (1949–1958)

Orders
- Ordination: 1938
- Consecration: 1942

Personal details
- Born: Vissarion Tikas; 10 February 1913 Karditsa, Greece
- Died: 10 April 1998 (aged 85) Athens, Greece
- Buried: First Cemetery of Athens
- Denomination: Greek Orthodoxy
- Profession: Theologian
- Education: University of Athens

Seraphim (Greek, Σεραφείμ) born Vissarion Tikas (Greek, Βησσαρίων Τίκας) (10 February 1913 – 10 April 1998) was Archbishop of Athens and All Greece as such the primate of the Autocephalous Orthodox Church of Greece from 13 January 1974 to 10 April 1998.

== Titles ==
Styles of Archbishop Seraphim of Athens
- Reference style: The late Archbishop Seraphim
- Spoken style: The late Seraphim (Makaristós),
- Religious style: Archbishop

The official title of the Archbishop of Athens and All Greece is:

The late Seraphim, Archbishop of Athens and All Greece

in Greek:

Ο Μακαριστός Αρχιεπίσκοπος Αθηνών και Πάσης Ελλάδος Σεραφείμ

== Biography ==
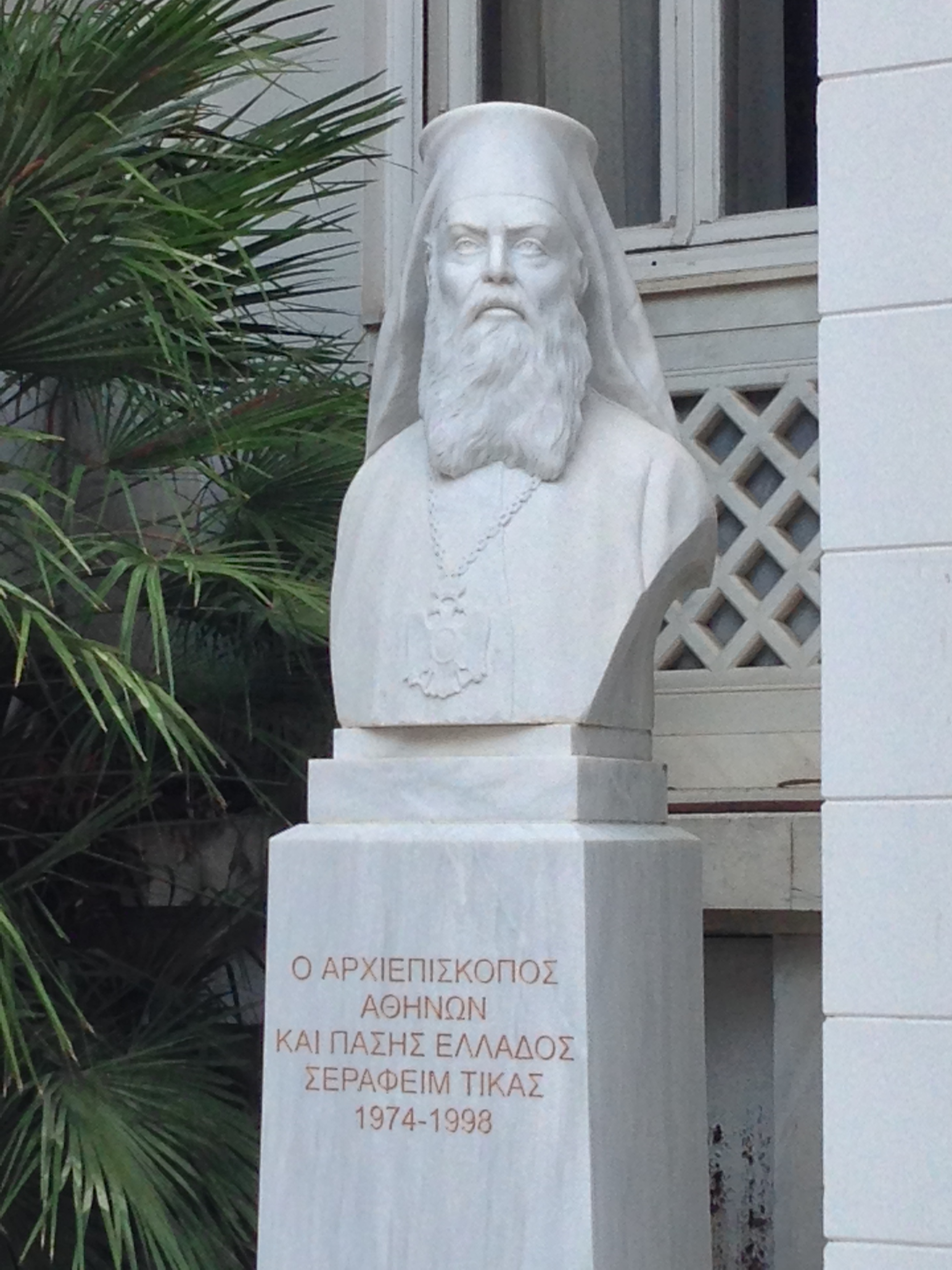
The bust of Archbishop Seraphim at the building of the Holy Archdiocese of Athens, 2014.

The grave of Archbishop Seraphim at the First Cemetery of Athens, 2018.

He was born in the village of Artesiano near Karditsa, Greece in 1913. Archbishop Seraphim of Athens enrolled in the Theological School of the University of Athens in 1936 and graduated in 1940. During his second year (1938), he became a monk in the Pendeli Monastery.

Seraphim of Athens was ordained a deacon by the then Metropolitan Bishop of Corinth and by Archbishop Damaskinos of Athens, and served at the Church of the Holy Trinity in Neo Iraklio.

In 1942 he was ordained a priest and an archimandrite, also by Archbishop Damaskinos and served as parish priest at the Church of St Luke in Patisia. During the Axis occupation of Greece during World War II, he joined the ranks of EDES under general Napoleon Zervas.

He served as secretary of the Holy Synod of the Church of Greece, and in 1949, was elected Metropolitan Bishop of Arta and in 1958 was transferred to Ioannina.

Archbishop Seraphim of Athens was elected Archbishop of Athens and All Greece on January 13, 1974, succeeding Archbishop Ieronymos I.

As prelate of the Church of Greece, he visited the Patriarchates of Constantinople, Antioch, Moscow, Sofia and Belgrade.

During his 24 years as church leader he swore in six Presidents of Greece and numerous Prime Ministers.

He died in Athens on April 10, 1998. The government declared four days of national mourning.

Eastern Orthodox Church titles
Preceded by Ieronymos I	Archbishop of Athens and All Greece; 1974 – 1998	Succeeded by Christodoulos
