= Chrysostomos II of Athens =

Archbishop of Athens and All Greece from 1962 to 1967

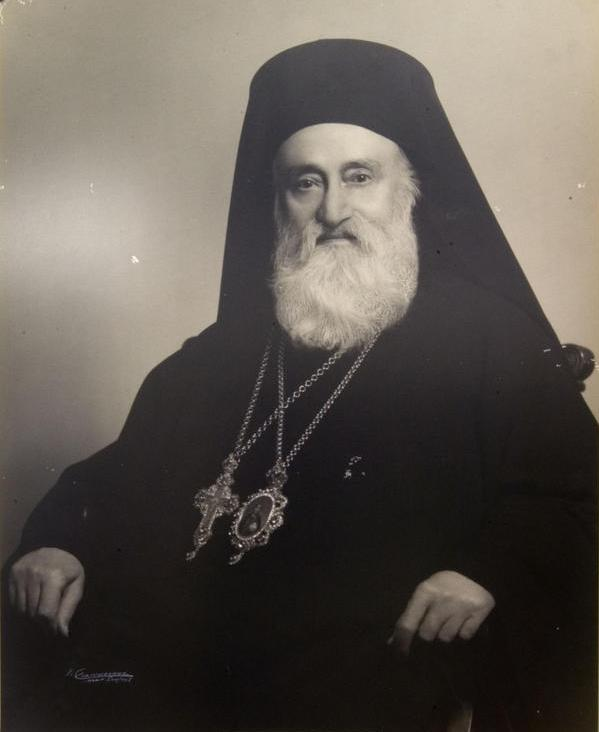
Photograph of Archbishop Chrysostomos II

Chrysostomos II (Greek: Χρυσόστομος Β΄, 1880 – June 9, 1968) was Archbishop of Athens and All Greece from 14 February 1962 to 11 May 1967.

== Life ==
He was born as Themistoklis Hatzistavrou (Greek: Θεμιστοκλής Χατζησταύρου) in Aydin, Asia Minor in 1880. After completing his gymnasium education, he entered the Theological School of Halki, graduating 1902. He then joined the faculty of the University of Lausanne in Lausanne, Switzerland. At the university he was able to establish a relationship with the various heterodox people.

After his return to Greece, Chrysostomos was ordained a deacon as he entered holy orders. In 1910, he was consecrated bishop as vicar to the Metropolitan of Smyrna. In 1913, he was appointed Metropolitan of Philadelphia. During his tenure at Philadelphia, Metr. Chrysostomos engaged in activities involving national liberation that resulted in his being sentenced to death by the Sultan's Viceroy Rahmi Bey. However, through the intervention of some influential people he escaped execution. Subsequently, he was transferred and named Metropolitan of Ephesus.

In 1922, Chrysostomos moved to Greece following the exchange of populations that took place after the Second Greco-Turkish War. In Greece, he was appointed the metropolitan of a new metropolis, a position he retained until he was elected Archbishop of Athens. In 1961, he presided at the Pan-Orthodox Meeting of Rhodes that was a preparatory meeting to an Orthodox wide synod.

Metr. Chrysostomos was elected Archbishop of Athens on 14 February 1962. Following the military coup in April 1967, Chrysostomos was pressured by the new military government to step down. On 11 May 1967, he was forced to retire as the ruling hierarch of Greece. In June 1968, he died; he was buried at the Church of Agioi Theodoroi (First Cemetery of Athens).
