= Takis Michas =

Greek journalist and author

Takis Michas (Greek: Τάκης Μίχας) is a Greek journalist and author who lives in Athens, where he works for the Greek daily Eleftherotypia and contributes to the Wall Street Journal Europe. He has written extensively about the Greek involvement in the Bosnian war, especially in the Srebrenica massacre.

== Journalism ==
In 1989 he received the European Union Journalists Award for his published columns on the crisis in Poland during the 1980s. In 2002 he received the Greek Botsis Prize for Journalism for his reports on Slobodan Milosevic's bank assets in Greece.

He has written articles for the Wall Street Journal, the National Interest, the New Republic, Huffington Post, Greek journals and others. He was nominated for the 2011 Bastiat Prize for three articles: "Greece's Bailout Brinksmanship", "Athens Descends into Anarchy", and "A Greek Tragedy".

== Greek Volunteer Guard controversy ==
In 2010 he faced an action for criminal libel following his reference in an article for Eleftherotypia to allegations that the Greek Volunteer Guard took part in the Srebrenica massacre and raised the Greek flag over Srebrenica. At the last minute Stavros Vitalis, a former Greek officer in the Bosnian Serb Army who considered the quoted use of the term "paramilitary" an insult to the Greek volunteer forces in Bosnia, abandoned the action.

The quality, thoroughness and courage of Michas's reporting of the military support that Greek "volunteers" gave the Bosnian Serb side during the 1992-1995 war in Bosnia and the reluctance of successive Greek governments to investigate the issue was highlighted in Reporters Sans Frontieres's criticism of what the organisation described as a "surreal" action and a clear case of judicial harassment.

== Bibliography ==
Michas is the author of the following books:

- The Absence of Civil Society in Greece (Århus: Århus Universitetsforlag 1989)
- Unholy Alliance: Greece and Milosevic’s Serbia (Texas: Texas A&M University Press 2002). The book was characterized as the "book of the year" by the Times Literary Supplement, as the "best new publication on the Balkans" by the New York Review of Books and as "the political book of the year" by the Washington Monthly.
- He was one of the contributors in the collective publication (ed. Baravalle) Rethink: Causes and Consequences of September 11 (New York: de.MO 2003). Other contributors included Noam Chomsky, Gunter Grass, Joseph Nye.
- Η Παρεμβολη των Γαλλων Νεων Φιλοσοφων (The Intervention of French Neo-Philosophers) (Athens 1979: Papazisis)
- Ανίερη Συμμαχια: H Ελλάδα και η Σερβία του Μιλοσεβιτς (Unholy Alliance: Greece and Milosevic's Serbia) (Athens: Elati 2006)
- Φιλελευθερη Σοσιαλδημοκρατια(Liberal Social Democracy (together with D. Skalkos)(Athens: Elati 2006)
- Νοαμ Τσομσκι και Φιλελευθερισμος (Noam Chomsky and Classical Liberalism) (Athens: Kritiki 2007)

"H Μαυρη Βιβλος της Ελληνικης Οικονομιας" (The Black Book of the Greek Economy) (Athens:Oxý (Οξύ) 2016)
