= Metropolitan Cathedral of Athens =

Greek Orthodox cathedral in Athens

Coordinates: 37.975253°N 23.730158°E

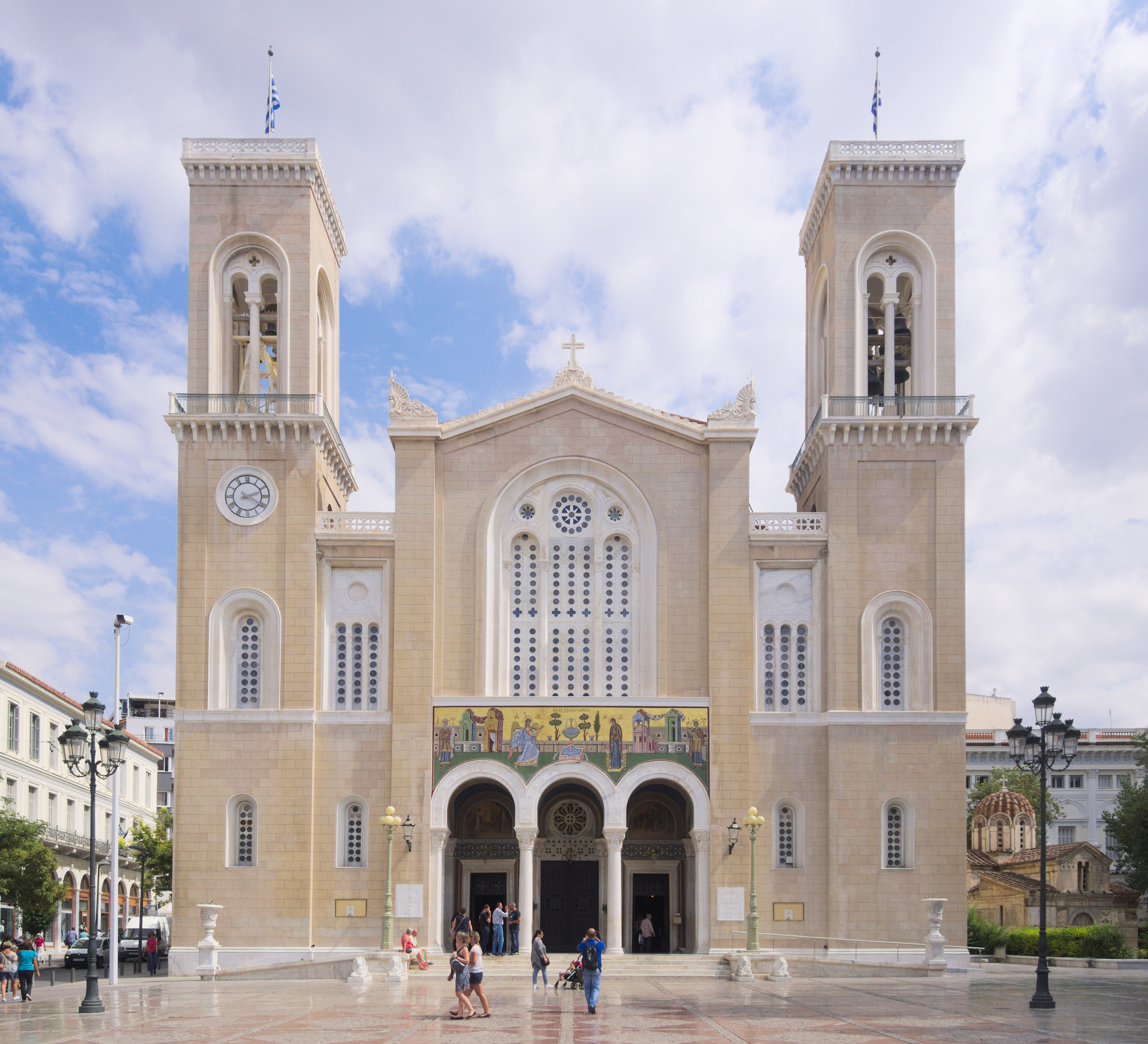
The façade

The Metropolitan Cathedral of the Annunciation (Greek: Καθεδρικός Ναός Ευαγγελισμού της Θεοτόκου, romanized: Kathedrikós Naós Evangelismoú tis Theotókou), popularly known as the Metropolis or Mitropoli (Greek: Μητρόπολη, romanized: Mitrópoli), is the cathedral church of the Archbishopric of Athens and all of Greece.

== History ==
Construction of the cathedral began on Christmas Day, 1842 with the laying of the cornerstone by King Otto and Queen Amalia. Construction started under the architect Theophil Hansen and was continued by Dimitris Zezos, Panagis Kalkos and François Boulanger.

Workers used marble from 72 demolished churches to build the cathedral's immense walls. Three architects and 20 years later, it was completed. On 21 May 1862, the completed cathedral was dedicated to the Annunciation of the Mother of God (Ευαγγελισμός της Θεοτόκου) by the King and Queen. The cathedral is a three-aisled, domed basilica that measures 130 feet (40 m) long, 65 feet (20 m) wide, and 80 feet (24 m) high. Inside are the tombs of two saints killed by the Ottoman Turks during the Ottoman period: Saint Philothei and Patriarch Gregory V.

- Saint Philothei built a convent, was martyred in 1589, and her bones are still visible in a silver reliquary. She is honoured for ransoming Greek women enslaved in Ottoman Empire's harems.
- Gregory V the Ethnomartyr, Patriarch of Constantinople, was hanged by order of Sultan Mahmud II and his body thrown into the Bosphorus in 1821, in retaliation for the Greek uprising on 25 March, leading to the Greek War of Independence. His body was rescued by Greek sailors and eventually enshrined in Athens.

To the immediate south of the cathedral is the little Church of St. Eleftherios also called the "Little Mitropoli".

In the Mitropoleos Square in front of the cathedral stand two statues. The first is that of Constantine XI, the last emperor of the Eastern Roman Empire. The second is a statue of Archbishop Damaskinos who was Archbishop of Athens during World War II and was Regent for King George II and Prime Minister of Greece in 1946.

The Metropolitan Cathedral remains a major landmark in Athens and the site of important ceremonies with national political figures present, as well as weddings and funerals of notable personalities.

== Gallery ==
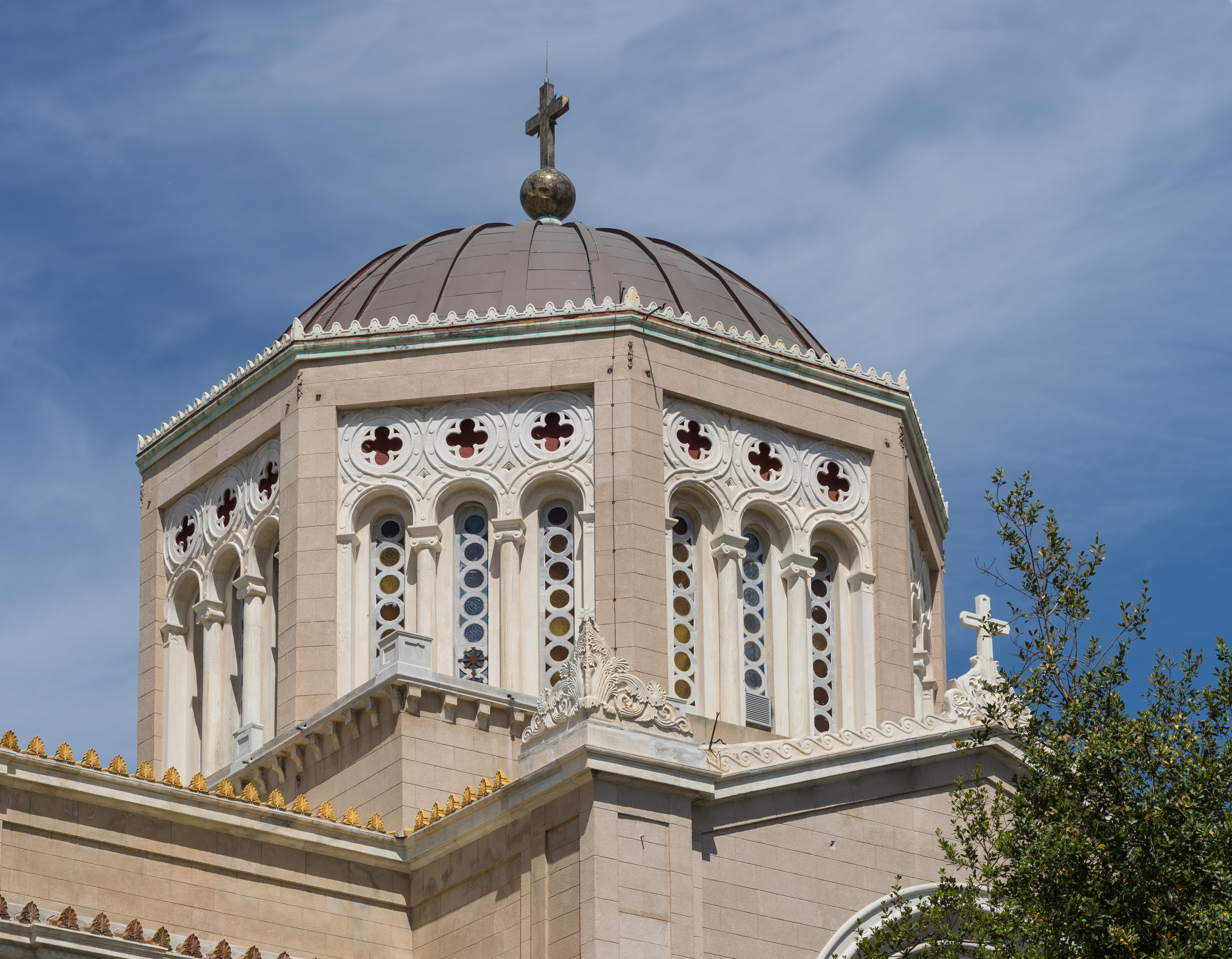
View of the dome

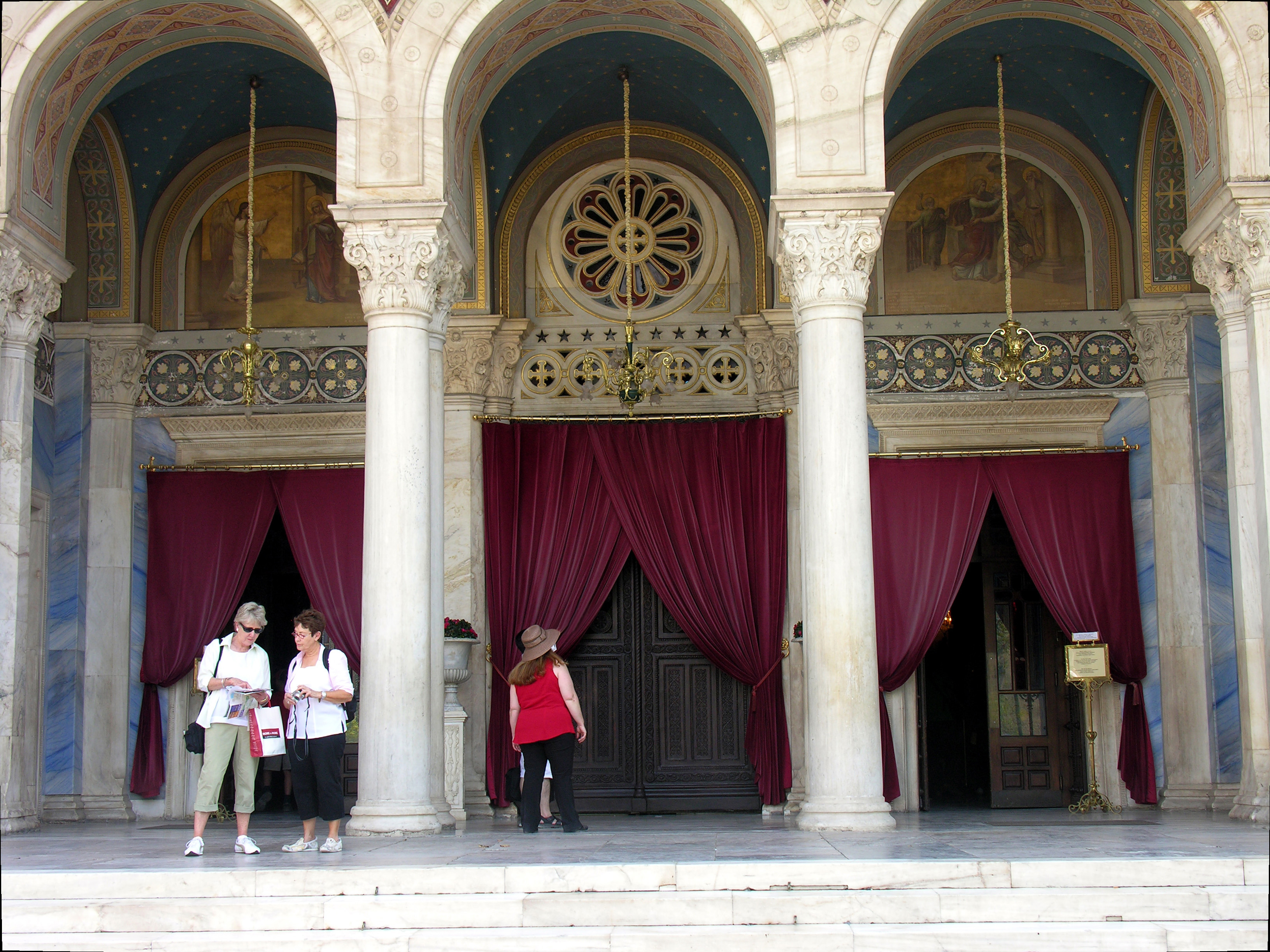
Entrance

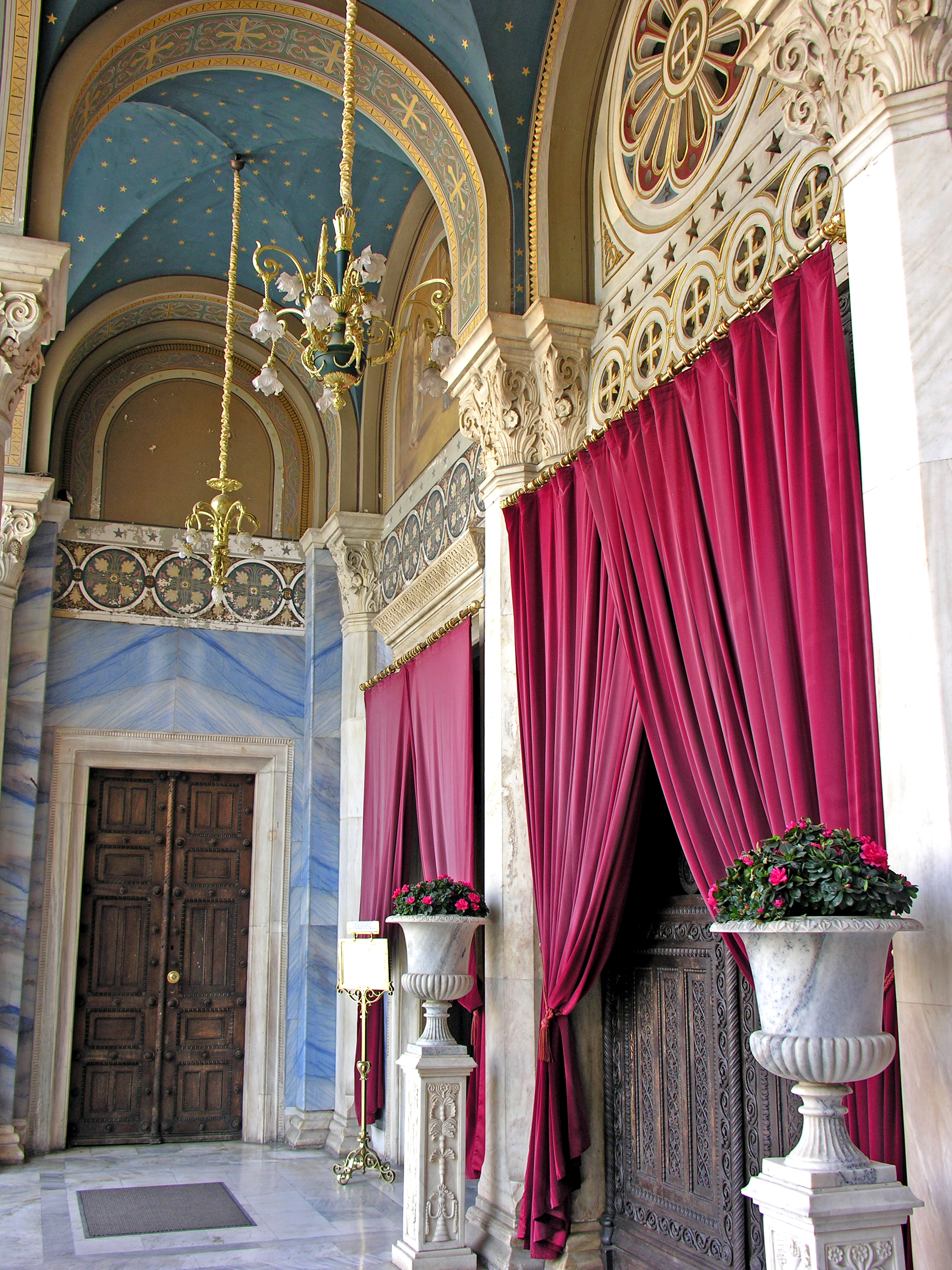
Interior

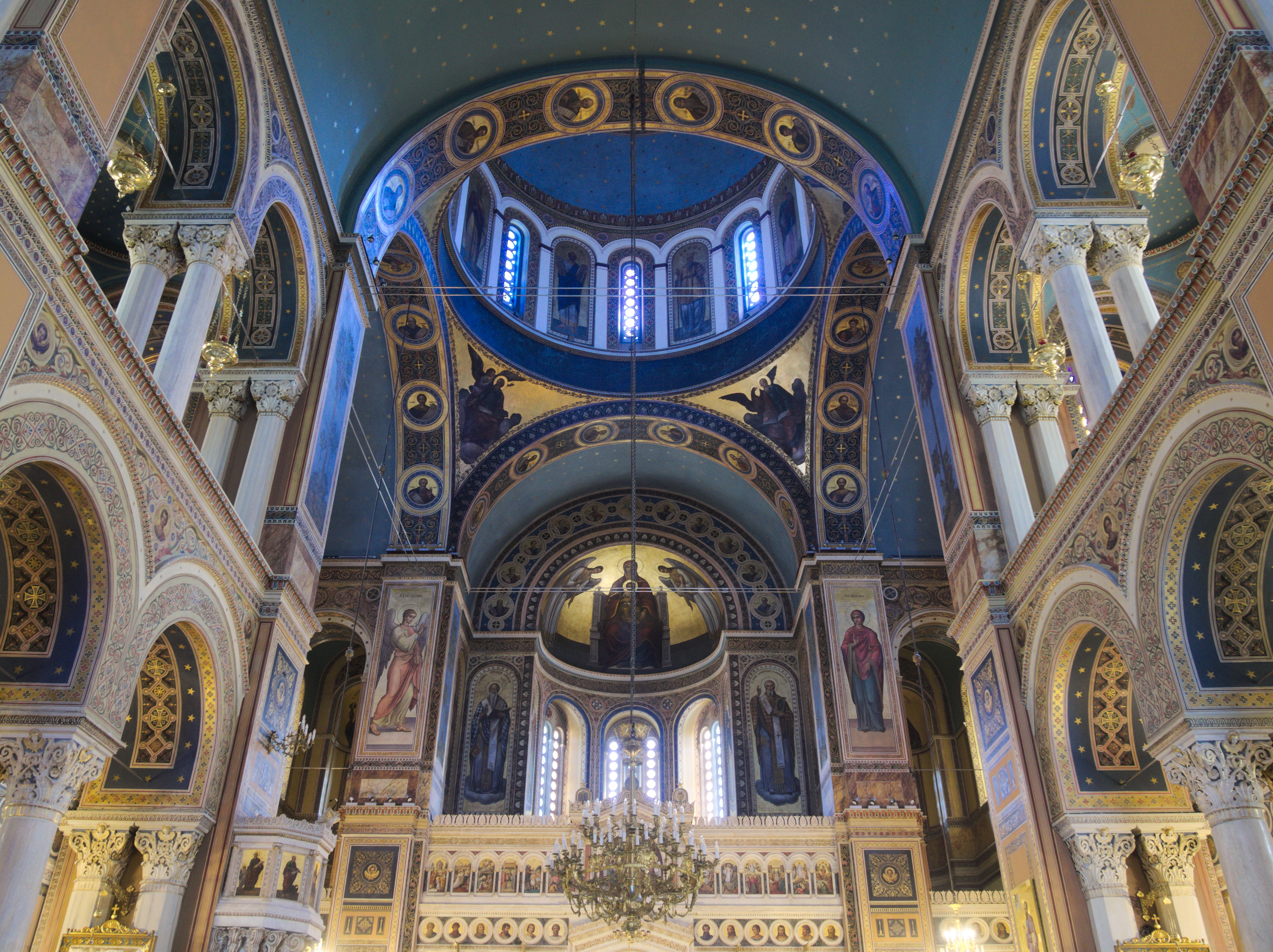
Interior

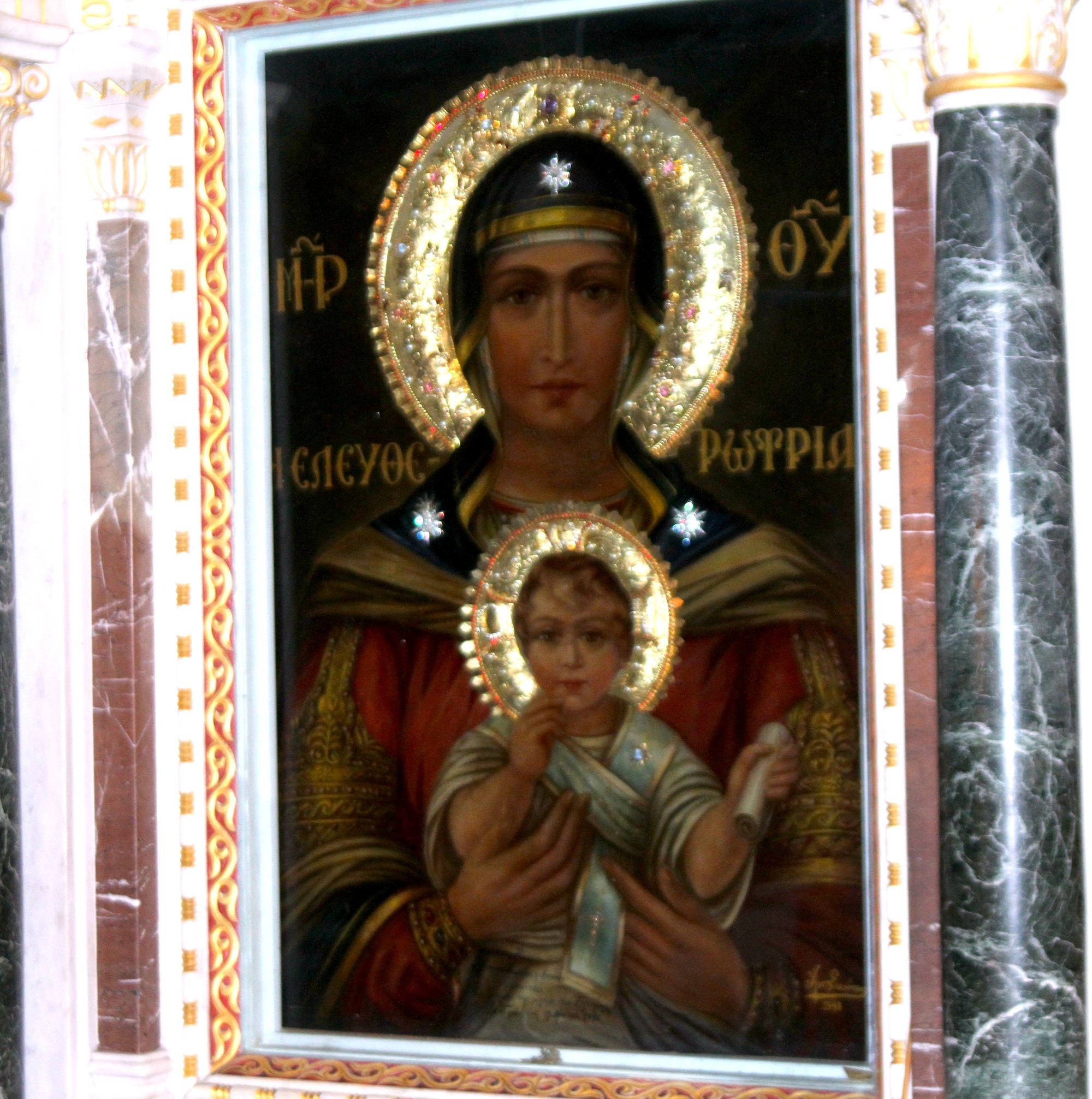
Virgin Mary with Child icon

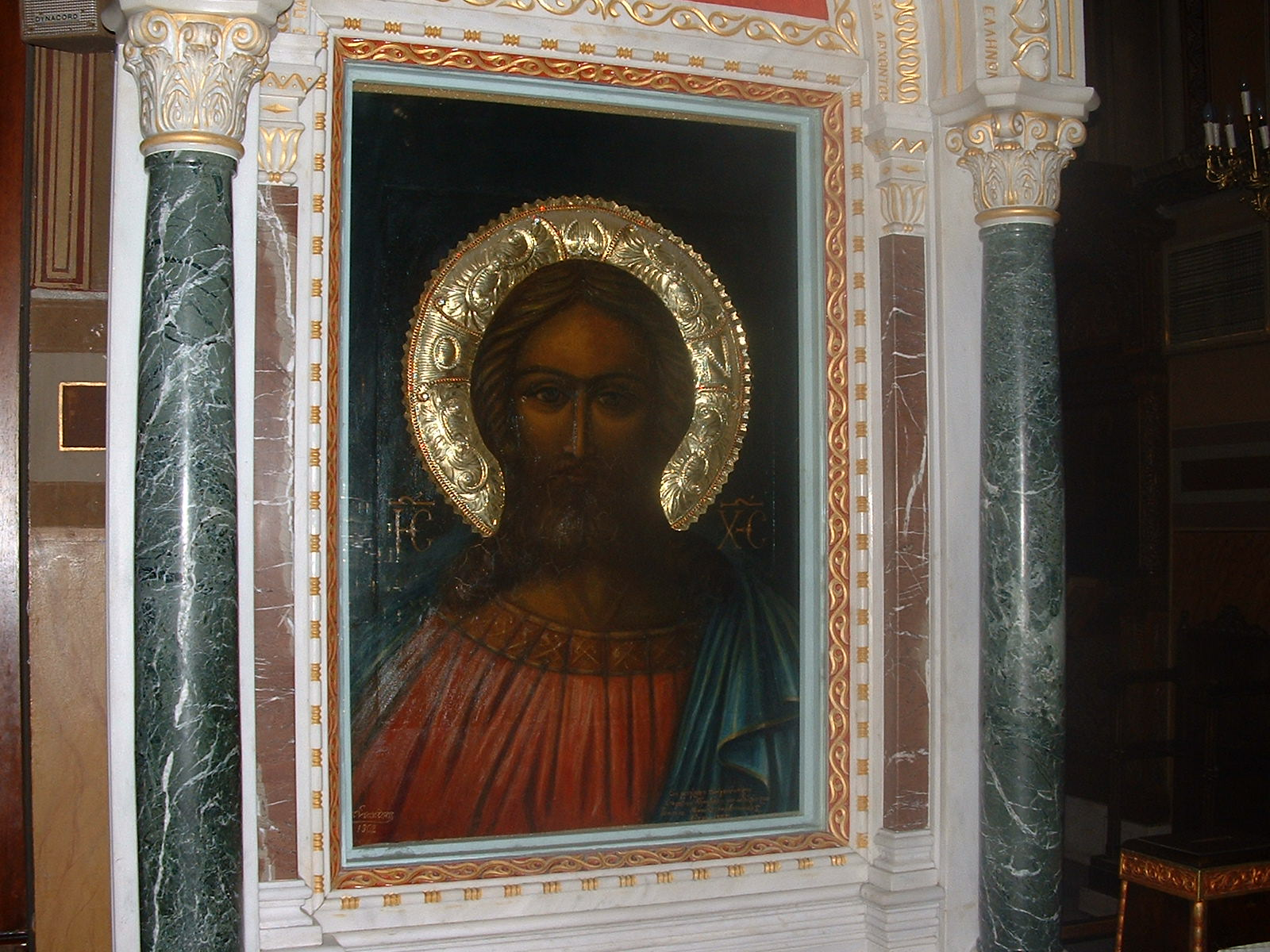
Jesus Christ painted around the late 1800s

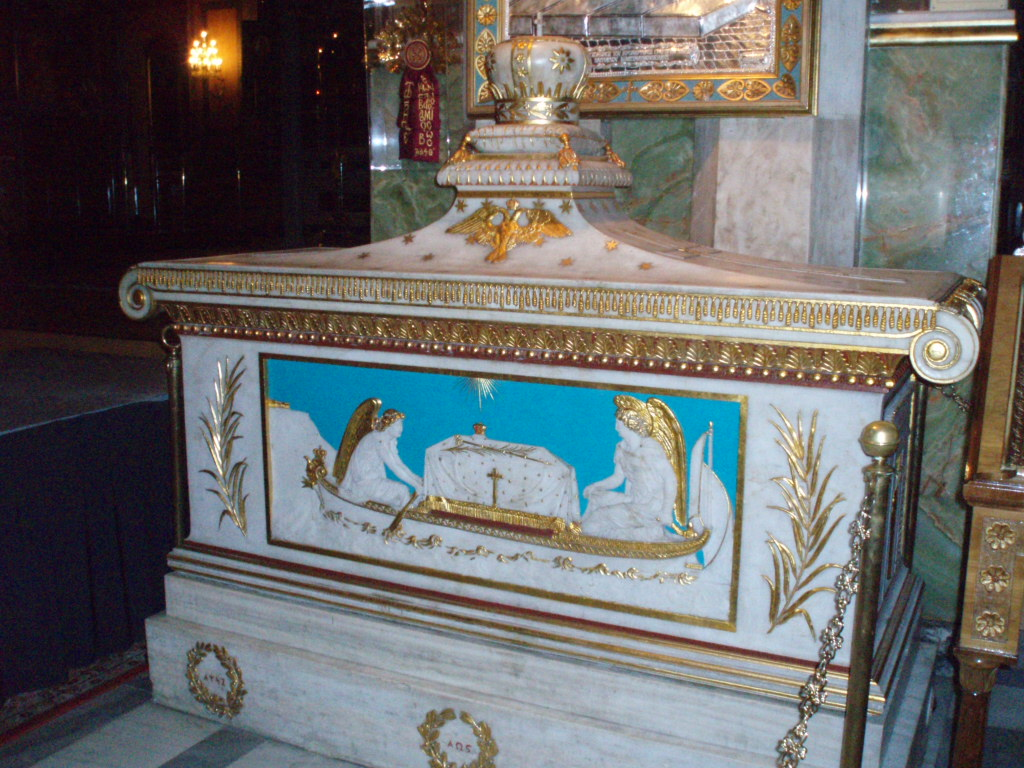
Reliquary containing the relics of Saint Gregory V of Constantinople

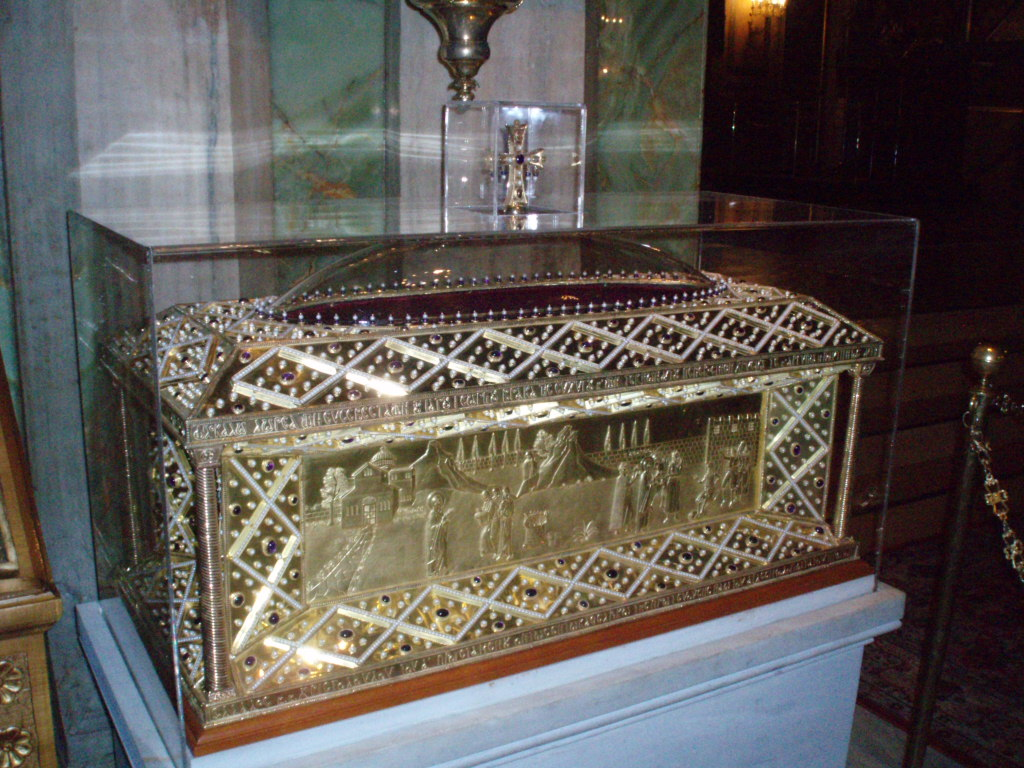
The shrine of St Philothei

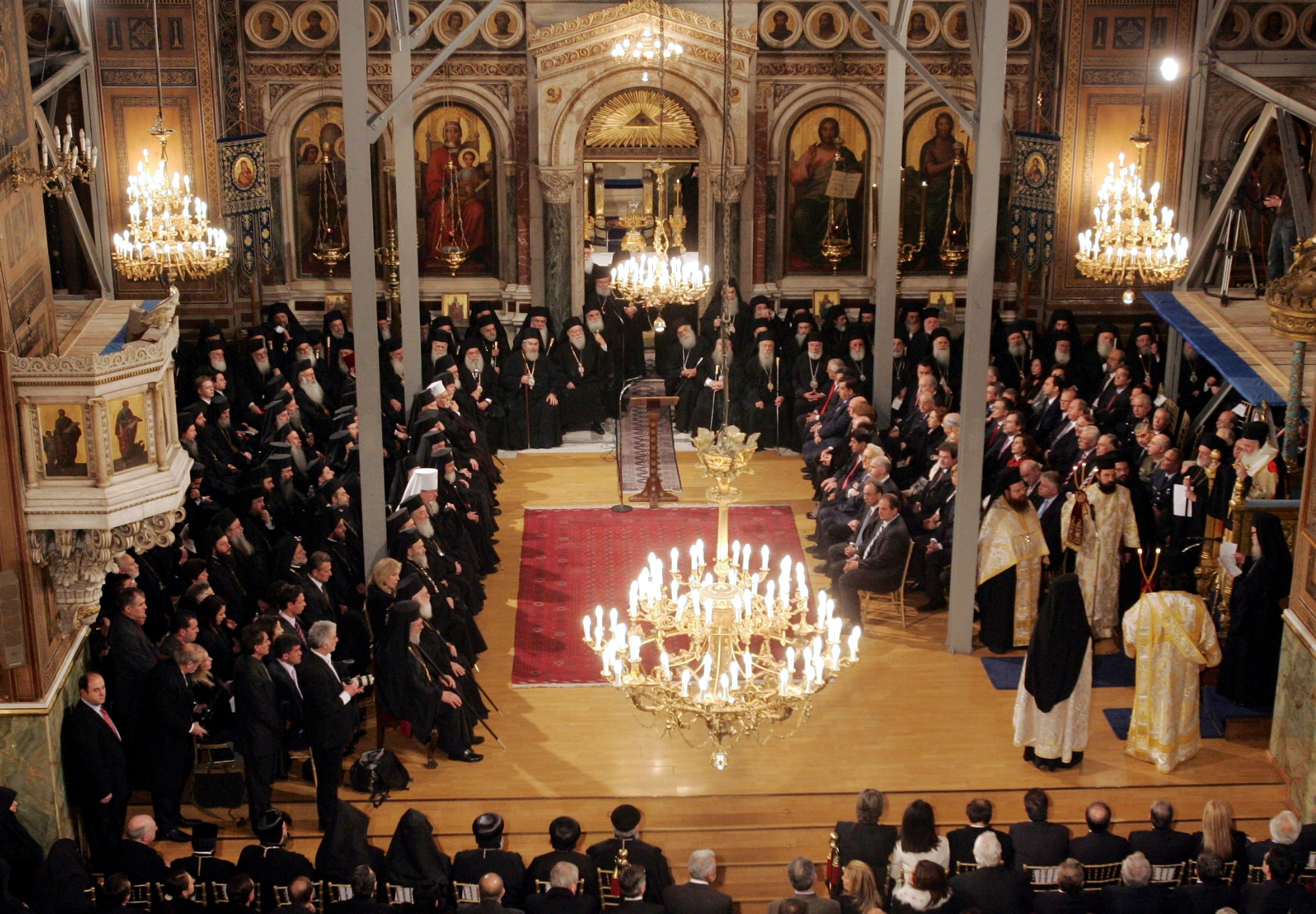
Enthronement ceremony of Archbishop Ieronymos

== Sources ==
- Sacred Destinations
- Church of Greece
