= Dorotheus I of Athens =

Dorotheus I (Greek: Δωρόθεος Αʹ) was the Greek Orthodox metropolitan bishop of Athens from c. 1388 to 1392, and the first to reside in the city since 1205.

He was the first Orthodox bishop of Athens to be allowed to reside in the city since its conquest by the Crusaders in 1205 and the exile of its then bishop, Michael Choniates. Holders of the see continued to be appointed in the meanwhile, but were always in exile, while Athens, like most of the principalities of Frankish Greece, remained the sole province of Roman Catholic clergy. The situation changed in 1388, when the Duchy of Athens passed into the hands of the Florentine Acciaioli family. With little military might of their own, and surrounded by potential rivals and enemies, the Acciaioli cultivated a policy of conciliation towards the overwhelmingly Orthodox local Greek population. To that end, they adopted Greek as the official language of their chancery, and allowed an Orthodox metropolitan to resume residence in their capital. However, even then the cathedral Church of the Virgin in the Parthenon remained the residence of the Latin Archbishop of Athens, and Dorotheus had to do with a church in the lower city. Dorotheus was also proedros, i.e. administrator, of the vacant sees of Thebes and Neopatras, which were also located within the duchy.

Dorotheus was expelled from his see in 1392 by Duke Nerio I Acciaioli, who accused him of treacherous dealings with the Ottoman Turks, because, in the spirit of his ardent hostility to the Latin Church, he had welcomed the raids of the Ottoman commander Evrenos Beg against the Frankish states of southern Greece in 1391–92. A synod of the Patriarchate of Constantinople absolved Dorotheus of any blame, with the justification that the arguments of Nerio were inadmissible since he was a Catholic. Nevertheless, Nerio refused to allow his return.

== Sources ==
- Miller, William (1908). The Latins in the Levant: A History of Frankish Greece (1204–1566). London: John Murray. OCLC 563022439.
- Setton, Kenneth M. (1976). The Papacy and the Levant (1204–1571), Volume I: The Thirteenth and Fourteenth Centuries. Philadelphia: The American Philosophical Society. ISBN 0-87169-114-0.

Eastern Orthodox Church titles
| Preceded by Nicodemus | Metropolitan bishop of Athens; 1388–1392 | Succeeded by Macarius I |
