= Archbishopric of Athens =

Eastern Orthodox-oriented jurisdiction

Archbishop of Athens and All Greece
- Archbishopric

Eastern Orthodox
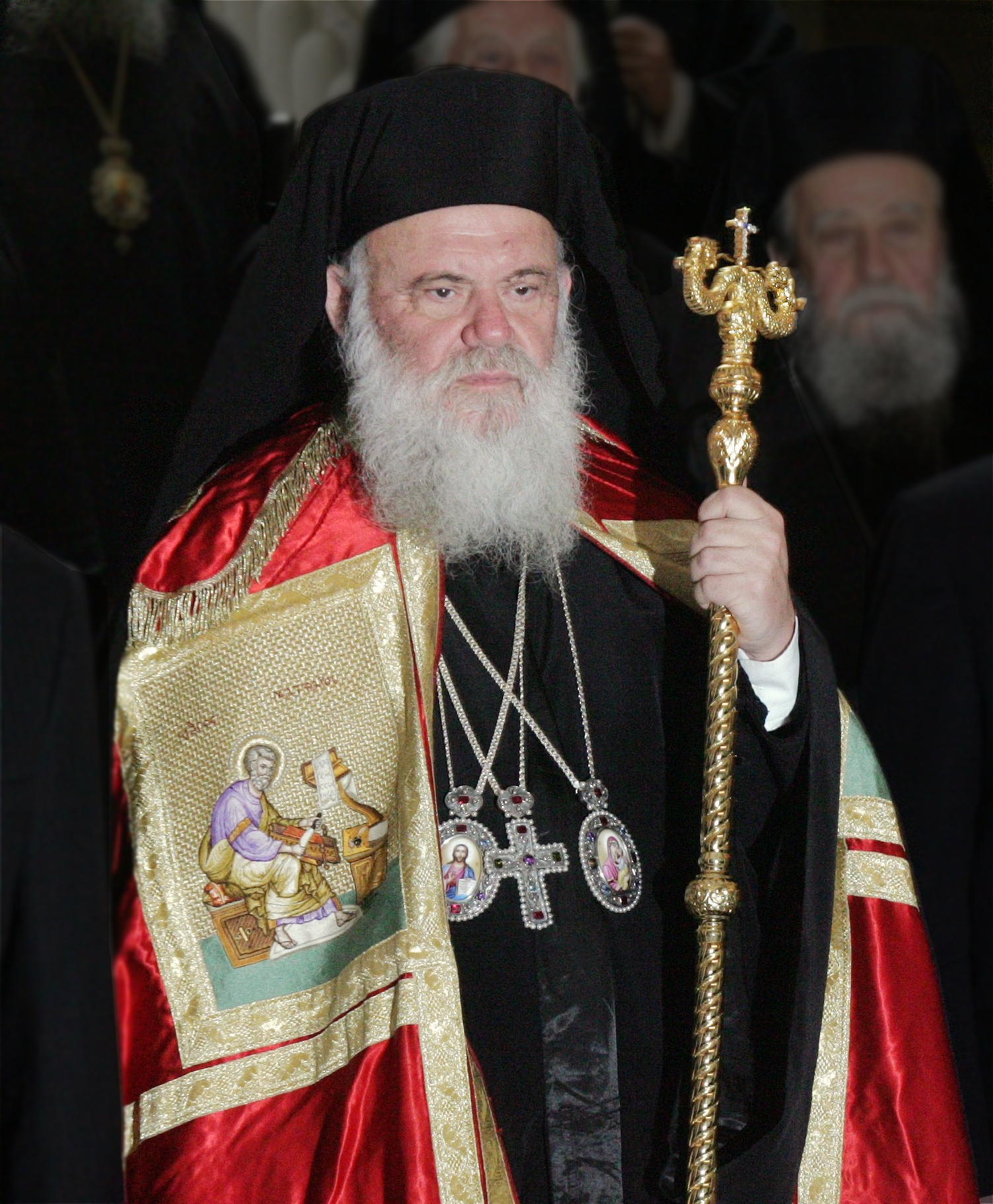
- Ieronymos II of Athens in 2008

- Coat of arms
- Incumbent; Ieronymos II since 7 February 2008
- Style: His Beatitude

Location
- Country: Greece

Information
- Established: 1st century autocephalous since 1850; Current form since 1923
- Diocese: Athens
- Cathedral: Cathedral of Annunciation
- Assistant bishops: Ioannis of Thermopylae; Agathangelos of Fanari; Panteleimon of Koroneia; Iakovos of Thaumakou; Constantios of Androusa; Chrysostomos of Evripos; Philotheos of Rogon; Ignatius of Salona; Nektarios of Photiki; Apostolos of Tanagra; Nektarios of Karyoupolis; Ioannis of Skiathos; Barnabas of Christoupolis; Nikodemos of Epidaurus; Theologos of Talantiou

Website
- http://www.iaath.gr/

The Archbishopric of Athens (Greek: Ιερά Αρχιεπισκοπή Αθηνών) is a Greek Orthodox archiepiscopal see based in the city of Athens, Greece. It is the senior see of Greece, and the seat of the autocephalous Church of Greece. Its incumbent (since 2008) is Ieronymos II of Athens. As the head of the Church of Greece, the holder is styled Archbishop of Athens and All Greece (Αρχιεπίσκοπος Αθηνών και πάσης Ελλάδος).

== History ==
As with most of Greece, the Church of Athens was established by St. Paul during his second missionary journey, when he preached at the Areopagus, probably in 50 or 51 AD. According to the Acts of the Apostles (17:16–34), after the sermon, a number of people became followers of Paul, thus forming the kernel of the Church in Athens. Dionysius the Areopagite was the first Bishop of Athens.

With the Christianization of the Roman Empire and the establishment of a regular Church hierarchy, Athens became a suffragan see of the Metropolis of Corinth, the metropolitan see of the Roman province of Achaea. As with most of Greece, however, the old pagan religion continued for considerable time. Despite imperial prohibitions during the 4th century, there is considerable evidence for a flourishing pagan culture up to the end of the century, and it was probably only the devastation of the Gothic raids in 395–397 that dealt a first hard blow to the ancient pagan culture. The last pagan vestiges in Athens itself survived until the 6th century and the closure of the city's Neoplatonic Academy by Justinian I in 529.

As with the rest of the Illyricum, Athens belonged originally to the jurisdiction of the Patriarch of Rome, but the progressive strengthening of the Patriarch of Constantinople, and the changing political circumstances of the 7th century led finally to the subordination of the entire Eastern Illyricum to Constantinople in c. 731/2. Despite the occasional appointment of its bishop as papal vicar—chiefly in an attempt to shore up Rome's position in the area—Athens itself remained firmly subordinated to Corinth during the early Byzantine period.

Due to the influence of Empress Irene of Athens, the see was raised to the rank of a metropolis sometime after 765, but this was short-lived and was reversed after the protests of the Metropolitan of Corinth. Nevertheless, by 819 Athens had become an autocephalous archbishopric, and in the ecumenical councils of 869/70 and 879, the see of Athens appears as a metropolis, but the preserved inscriptions on the Parthenon show that this was not permanent. The power struggle with Corinth was finally settled until 975, when Athens was permanently raised to the status of a separate metropolis. In the various Notitiae Episcopatuum of the 8th and 9th centuries, the position of Athens in the hierarchy of the metropolises under Constantinople fluctuates, but is relatively low (34th out of 37 in Notitia 2, and 48th out of 49 in Notitia 3). It rose to 28th place by c. 901, a place it held for the next three centuries. Its jurisdiction encompassed the southeastern parts of the province (theme) of Hellas, i.e. southeastern Central Greece and the nearest of the Cyclades. The original suffragans of Athens were, in order: Euripus, Dauleia, Koroneia, Andros, Oreos, Skyros, Karystos, Porthmos, Aulon, and Syros. With the exception of the addition of the sees of "Kea and Thermia" and of Megara in the middle of the 12th century, the list remained the same until the Fourth Crusade.

At the time of the Fourth Crusade, the see of Athens was in the hands of Michael Choniates. Refusing to acknowledge the authority of the Pope, he was forced to abandon his see, which became a Roman Catholic archbishopric under the Frenchman Berard. Based on a 1209 letter by Pope Innocent III, the list of suffragans under Latin rule only slightly changed: Euripus (Egripontis), Thermopylae (Cermopilensem, seat in Bodonitsa), Dauleia (Davaliensem), Aulon (Abelonensem), Oreos (Zorconensem), Karystos (Caristiensem), Koroneia (Coroniacensem), Andros (Andrensem), Megara (Megarensem), Skyros (Squirensem), and Kea (Cheensem), although most of these sees were vacant. In 1212, the formerly autocephalous archbishopric of Aegina, and the newly founded see of Salona (Salonensis) also appear as Athens' suffragans. The Catholic see remained vacant for a period after the Catalan Company conquered the Duchy of Athens in 1311 due to the Catalans' conflict with the papacy, and a residential archbishop is not attested until around the mid-14th century.

For the duration of the Frankish rule, the Orthodox see had continued to be filled in exile, either with titular holders or with bishops of other sees functioning as stewards (proedros) of the archiepiscopal see of Athens. The Orthodox clergy were consecrated by passing bishops, but were forced to acknowledge the authority of the Latin Archbishop in order to exercise their office. In the Byzantine Notitiae of the period, Athens fell in rank to 35th place under Andronikos II Palaiologos (r. 1282–1328), rose to 28th under Andronikos III Palaiologos (r. 1328–1341), and rose to 21st place by the turn of the 15th century. In 1388, the Duchy of Athens passed into the hands of the Florentine Acciaioli family. With little military might of their own, and surrounded by potential rivals and enemies, the Acciaioli cultivated a policy of conciliation towards the overwhelmingly Orthodox local Greek population. To that end, they adopted Greek as the official language of their chancery, and allowed an Orthodox metropolitan, Dorotheus, to resume residence in their capital. The cathedral Church of the Virgin in the Parthenon remained the residence of the Latin Archbishop of Athens, however, and Dorotheus used the small church of Dionysius the Areopagite in the lower city.

This situation prevailed until the Ottoman conquest of the city in 1456, when the Latin see was abolished and the Orthodox metropolitans were restored to their former position. In accordance with the Ottoman millet system, the metropolitan became also the chairman of the council of the community of Athens. The metropolitan cathedral in the Parthenon, however, was converted into a mosque, and the metropolitan bishop instead used the Church of St. Panteleimon, now destroyed.

Following the Greek War of Independence and the declaration of the autocephaly of the Church of Greece in 1833, the Church was reorganized and the Bishopric of Attica (Επισκοπή Αττικής) was established, with its jurisdiction covering the Attica Prefecture. Following the recognition of the autocephaly by the Patriarchate of Constantinople in 1850, the bishopric was raised again to metropolitan rank and renamed to Metropolis of Athens. As the sole metropolitan see of the independent Kingdom of Greece, its incumbent was assigned the permanent presidency of the Holy Synod of the Church of Greece. This situation lasted until 1922, when all episcopal sees in Greece were raised to metropolitan status. As a result, on 31 December 1923 the new Constitutional Charter of the Church of Greece raised the bishop of Athens to the position of Archbishop of Athens and All Greece.

== See also ==
- List of archbishops of Athens

== Sources ==
- Koder, Johannes; Hild, Friedrich (1976). Tabula Imperii Byzantini, Band 1: Hellas und Thessalia (in German). Vienna: Verlag der Österreichischen Akademie der Wissenschaften. ISBN 978-3-7001-0182-6.
- Miller, William (1908). The Latins in the Levant: A History of Frankish Greece (1204–1566). London: John Murray.
