= Timeline of Eastern Orthodoxy in Greece (1821–1924) =

This is a timeline of the presence of Eastern Orthodoxy in Greece from 1821 to 1924. The history of Greece traditionally encompasses the study of the Greek people, the areas they ruled historically, as well as the territory now composing the modern state of Greece.

== Greek War of Independence (1821–1829) ==
One of the pious views of modern Greece concerns the role of the Orthodox Church in the establishment of the modern Greek nation-state. According to this view, the Church, in the role of a latter-day Noah's Ark, saved the Greek nation in the centuries of the Turkish and Western "deluge" following the fall of the eastern Roman empire in 1453. The Orthodox Church, by protecting the true faith against both Muslim and Latin temporal princes in the centuries of foreign rule, preserved Greek identity and kept the Greek nation from being assimilated by the nations of its foreign rulers. According to the same view, the Orthodox Church welcomed the Greek War of Independence in 1821 and blessed the arms of the Greek insurgents. Indeed, many Orthodox prelates assumed a leading role in insurgent Greece and played an important part not only in ecclesiastical but also in political and military matters. Following Independence, a Latin prince and his Western advisers severed the links that had united the Church of Greece with the Ecumenical Patriarchate and placed the Church under the authority of his temporal power.

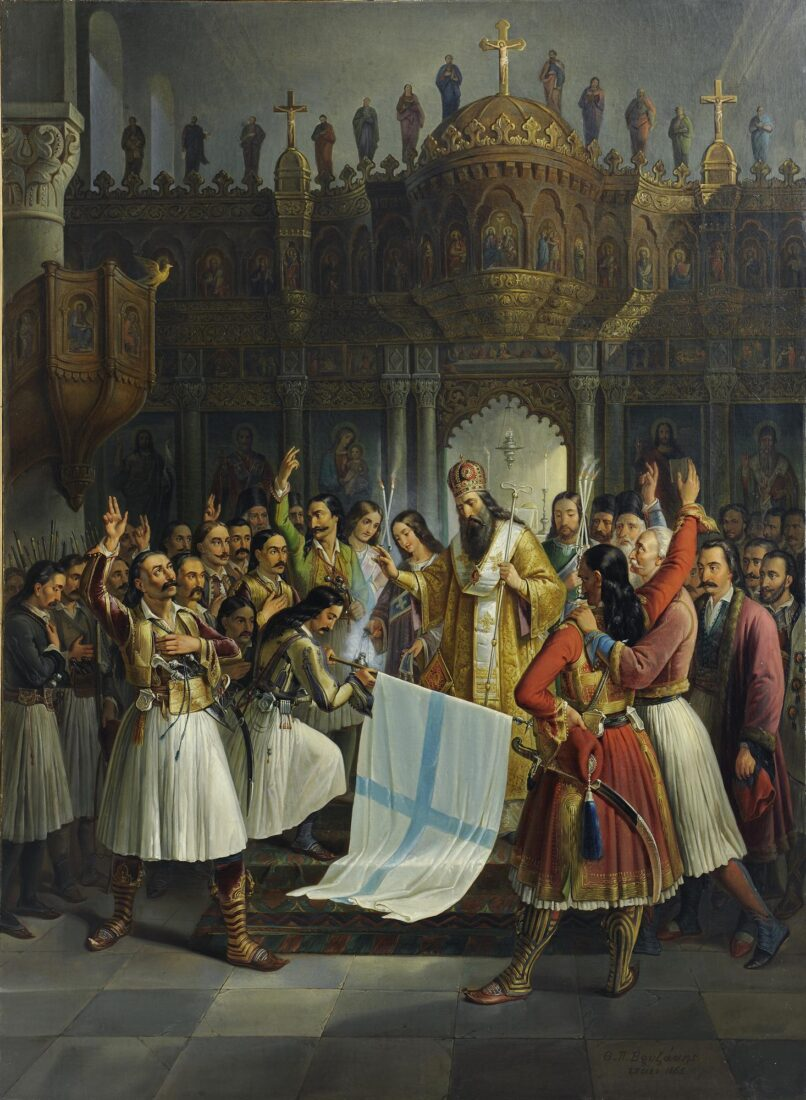
Bp. Germanos of Old Patras blessing the Greek banner at Agia Lavra, 25 March 1821. Theodoros Vryzakis (oil painting, 1851).

- 1821 Greek War of Independence begins as Metr. Germanos of Patras declares Greek independence on Day of Annunciation (25 March), also Kyrio-Pascha, (Note: From antiquity the Orthodox Church has celebrated with special liturgical joy the occurrence when Pascha falls on 25 March (Old Style) - the Feast of the Annunciation, calling it "Kyriopascha," "the Lord's Pascha". It was precisely on the coincidence of the Feasts of the Annunciation and Pascha on 25 March 1821 (Old Style), that Greece challenged the Turkish Yoke. Kyriopascha has also manifested its miraculous Grace to our own generation by its most recent occurrence in 1991, the year of the demise of Communism in Russia, a demise which, furthermore, was finalized by a last, desperate gasp in the form of an abortive Communist coup thwarted on 6 August (Old Style)–the Feast of the Transfiguration. The last Kyriopascha on the Julian calendar was in 1991; the next will be in 2075, 2086 and 2159. The last Kyriopascha on the Gregorian Calendar was in 1951, and the next will be in 2035, 2046 and 2103.) at the Monastery of Agia Lavra, Peloponnese; (Note: "The Greek revolt was precipitated on 25 March 1821, when Bishop Germanos of Patras raised the flag of revolution over the Monastery of Agia Lavra in the Peloponnese. The cry "Freedom or Death" became the motto of the revolution.") martyrdom of Patr. Gregory V of Constantinople, Abp. Kyprianos of Cyprus, and Abp. Gerasimos (Pardalis) of Crete in retaliation; former Ecumenical Patriarch Cyril VI of Constantinople (1813–18) is hanged at the gate of Adrianople's cathedral; Metropolitans Gregorios of Derkon, Dorotheos of Adrianople, Ioannikios of Tyrnavos, and Joseph of Thessaloniki are decapitated on the Sultan's orders in Constantinople; Metropolitans Chrysanthos of Paphos, Meletios of Kition and Lavrentios of Kyrenia are executed in Nicosia, Cyprus; Turkish Cypriot mobs hang most of the Greek Cypriots in Larnaca and other towns, among them an archbishop, five bishops, thirty six ecclesiastics; storming of Tripolitza, marking an early victory in the Greek War of Independence; liberation fighters started calling themselves "Hellenes" (for continuity with their ancient Hellenic heritage), rather than using the generic "Romioi" (Ρωμιοί, which referred to both their Roman citizenship and religious affiliation to Orthodox Christendom); death of Nikephoros of Chios.

Flag of Greece (1822–1978). In January 1822, the First National Assembly at Epidaurus adopted this design to replace the multitude of local revolutionary flags then in use.

- 1822 Greek Constitution of 1822 is adopted on 1 January by the First National Assembly at Epidaurus, stating that "all those indigenous inhabitants of the State of Hellas who believe in Christ are Hellenes" (Section B, Paragraph 2); the Chios massacre takes place, a total of about 100,000 people perish; decisive Greek victory at the Battle of Dervenakia over the superior forces of Mahmud Dramali Pasha saved the War of Independence; English poet Percy Bysshe Shelley writes the verse drama Hellas with a view to raising money for the Greek War of Independence.
- 1823 Wonderworking Icon of Panagia Evangelistria found on Tinos, led by a vision from Saint Pelagia of Tinos (†1834), becoming the most venerated pilgrimage item in Greece at the Church of Evangelistria; martyrdom of Hieromonk Christos of Ioannina; Lord Byron agreed to act as agent of the London Philhellenic Committee, sending £4,000 of his own money to prepare the Greek fleet and joining statesman Alexandros Mavrokordatos, revered in Greece as a national hero. (Note: According to William Plomer, "Byron had yet to die to make philhellenism generally acceptable." A municipality called "Vyronas" in the southeastern part of the Athens agglomeration is named after him.)
- 1824 Inspired by Philhellenist Lord Byron, American physician Samuel Gridley Howe joined the Greek army as a surgeon, becoming known for his bravery, enthusiasm, and ability as a commander, as well as his humanity, winning him the title the "Lafayette of the Greek Revolution," later writing an account of the revolt titled Historical Sketch of the Greek Revolution, published in 1828.

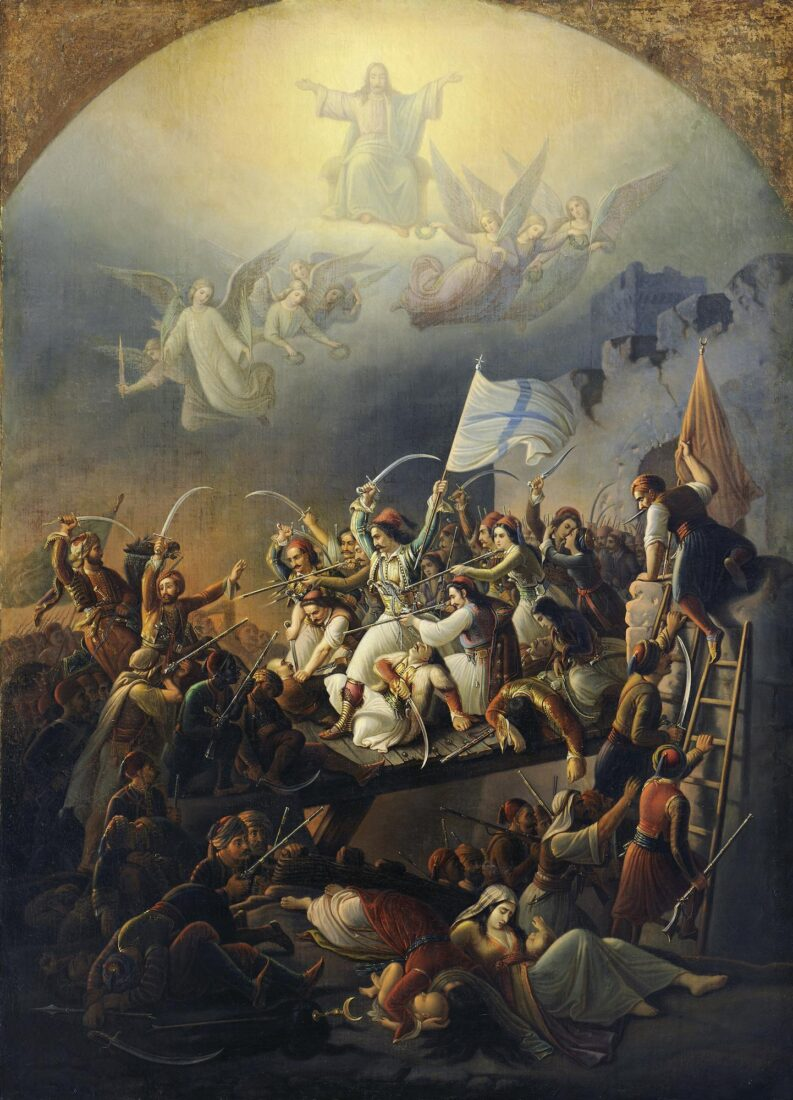
The Exodus of Messolonghi by Theodoros Vryzakis.

- 1825 Archimandrite Gregorios Dikaios ("Papaflessas") is killed during the Battle of Maniaki on 20 June, fighting against the forces of Ibrahim Pasha at Maniaki, Messenia.
- 1826 The Exodus of Messolonghi (Greek: Έξοδος του Μεσολογγίου) occurred from 10 to 11 April 1826 (Lazarus Saturday – Palm Sunday), under the leadership of Notis Botsaris, Kitsos Tzavelas and Dimitrios Makris, against the Ottoman forces of Reşid Mehmed Pasha and the Egyptian forces led by Ibrāhīm Pasha, resulting in several thousand Greek deaths and thousands of women and children being enslaved, ultimately increasing the Philhellenist movement in Europe and having a significant influence on the eventual decision of Britain, France and Russia to intervene militarily in the Battle of Navarino (1827) and secure Greece's independence. (Note: Information on the losses of Greeks during the siege and subsequent exodus is contradictory. It seems likely that 3000 they took part in the exodus, and 1,700 died heroically in battle. Around 6,000 women and children were taken to be sold in Methoni and in the slave markets of Constantinople and Alexandria. The loss to Turkish-Egyptian invaders amounted to 5,000 men.)
- 1827 Russia, Britain and France in London recognize autonomy of Greece, and agree to force truce on Ottoman Sultan; Ioannis Kapodistrias is elected provisional president of Greece (Governor of Greece).
- 1828 In May Patriarch Agathangelos I dispatched a mission of four very senior prelates from the patriarchal synod to Greece bringing letters addressed to 'the clergy and notables of the Peloponnese and the Aegean Islands', whereby they were asked to resubmit to the Sublime Porte; (Note: In a respectful and entirely conciliatory letter, Kapodistrias rejected the patriarch's admonition, pointing out that it was totally impossible for the people of Greece to give up the freedom they had won with so many sacrifices. In contrast to Agathangelos, his successor Konstantios I sent his good wishes and his blessings to the Greek state in August 1830 but expressed his concern about news of Calvinist infiltration among the Orthodox of Greece. Kapodistrias reassured the patriarch about Greece's devotion to Orthodoxy and to the Great Church. This in turn gave Konstantios the opportunity to insist on the complete reestablishment of administrative unity between the church in the territories of the Greek state and the Great Church of Constantinople.) Greek church opened in London (2nd time).
- 1829 Treaty of Adrianople ends Greek War of Independence, culminating in the creation of the modern Greek state, after over 600 years of foreign occupation (around 250 years of Frankish occupation and 375 years of Ottoman Turkish occupation).

== First Hellenic Republic (1829–1832) ==
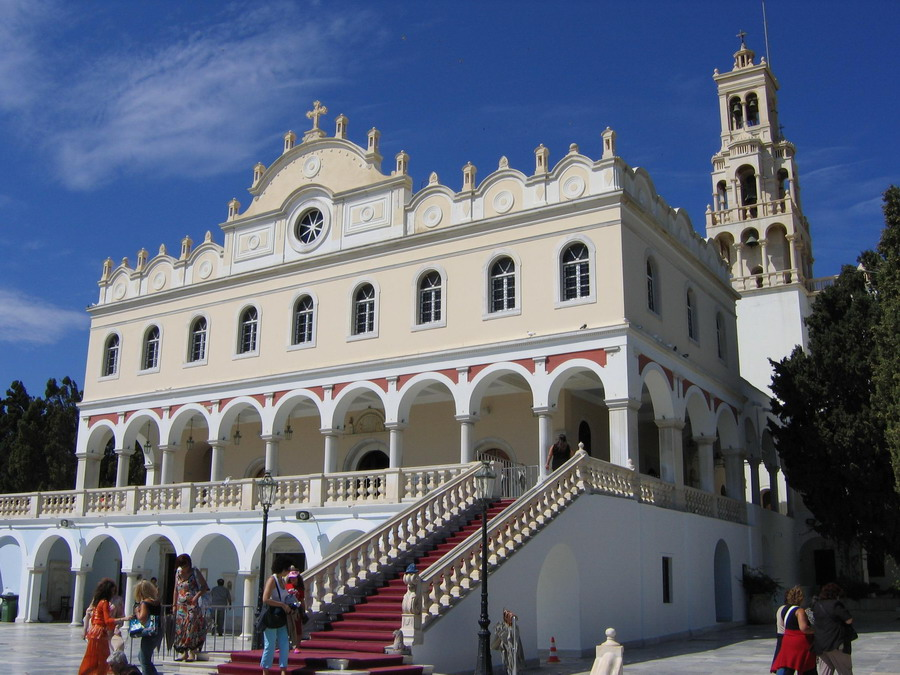
Church of Our Lady of Tinos.

- c. 1829 The purified and formal Katharevousa variety of Modern Greek is promoted as the official language (to 1976); (Note: "After the liberation of Greece from the Turks (1828), Katharevusa flourished in the Romantic literary school of Athens; it is exemplified in the classical odes, hymns, ballads, narrative poems, tragedies, and comedies of Aléxandros Rízos Rangavís and in the verses of Akhilléfs Paráskhos, characterized by rhetorical profuseness and mock-heroic patriotism.") Ioannis Kapodistrias made Nafplion the first official capital of modern Greece (1829–1834).
- 1830 Inauguration of the Church of Our Lady of Tinos, who is considered a patron saint of the Greek nation; (Note: "Immediately after the finding of the Holy Icon (in 1823), it was decided to build a big Church above the chapel of the Life-giving Well (Zoodochos Pigi). For this purpose the Lower Church was extended to the right and to the left by proper porticos in order to enlarge it and above it was started the construction of the brilliant Church which we see to-day, after the plans of Eustratios Kallonaris, an architect and artist from Smyrna. The whole work of construction the hagiography and the finishing of the Church, with the surrounding grounds and extensions was terminated by 1830, i.e. within eight years.") the fully sovereign status of Greece was accepted in the London Protocol of 3 February 1830. (Note: "The protocol declared Greece to be a fully independent state with the political system of a constitutional monarchy. Greece’s independence was guaranteed by the three powers that participated in the protocol. At the insistence of Great Britain, which was not interested in overly weakening Turkey, Thessaly, Crete, Samos, Acarnania, part of Aetolia, and a number of other territories populated by the Greeks were not regarded as part of Greece.)
- 1832 Treaty of Constantinople, European powers establish Greek protectorate; Otho I was chosen King of Greece by the great powers at the Conference of London in May 1832.

== Kingdom of Greece (1832–1924) ==
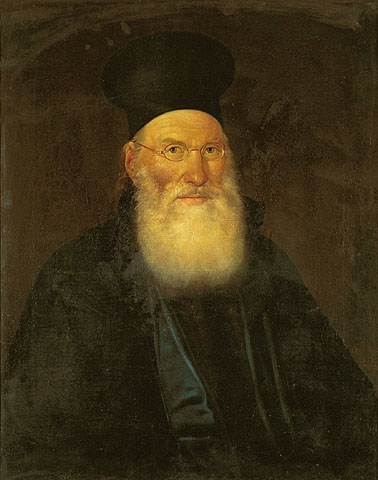
Portrait of Theoklitos Farmakidis, Greek Orthodox priest who was a liberal theologian and spokesman for the ideas of A. Korais and the Greek Enlightenment.

- 1833 Instigated by Georg von Maurer and led by Theoklitos Pharmakidis (a Greek Orthodox priest influenced by German Protestant thought), the National Assembly at Nauplio declares the Church of Greece independent (autocephalous) from the Ecumenical Patriarchate of Constantinople. (Note: "As a state church, the Orthodox Church of Greece has a lot in common with Protestant state churches. Indeed, the settlement of 1833 has often been regarded, then and later, as a distinctly Protestant scheme.") (Note: "The period of the "Bavarokratia," as the regency was termed, was not a happy one, for the regents showed little sensitivity to the mores of Otto's adopted countrymen and imported European models wholesale without regard to local conditions. Thus the legal and educational systems were heavily influenced by German and French models, as was the church settlement of 1833, which ended the traditional authority of the Ecumenical Patriarch and subjected ecclesiastical affairs to civil control." Faithful people – concerned that having a Roman Catholic as the head of the Church of Greece would weaken the Orthodox Church – criticised the unilateral declaration of Autocephaly as non-canonical. For the same reason, they likewise resisted the foreign, mostly Protestant, missionaries who established schools throughout Greece.)
- 1833–1834 Dissolution of the monasteries: the "Bavarokratia" closes down 600 monasteries and nationalises monastic land-holdings, allowing Protestant missionaries to work undisturbed. (Note: "Είναι χαρακτηριστικό ότι, έως την άφιξη των Βαυαρών το 1833, υπήρχαν 600 μοναστήρια, φορείς πνευματικότητος, ορθοδοξίας, αλλά και αντιστάσεως κατά την περίοδο της Τουρκοκρατίας. Εξ αυτών, με το πέρας ενός μόλις έτους (1834), είχαν διαλυθεί περισσότερα των... πεντακοσίων (!), ενώ οι αντιδρώντες κληρικοί και λαϊκοί εξορίστηκαν από την Αντιβασιλεία...") (Note: "When Greece became free, there existed a great number of monasteries, some two hundred and forty-five. It was soon decided to abolish all save eighty-six of these, and to employ the revenues of the properties attached to the monasteries in educating the clergy and paying the salaries of the bishops. The properties were confiscated accordingly, but the clergy have received exceedingly little benefit therefrom.") (Note: The regents of King Otto of Wittelsbach, Armansperg and Rundhart, established a controversial policy of suppressing the monasteries. This was very upsetting to the Church hierarchy. Russia was self-considered as stalwart defender of Orthodoxy but Orthodox believers were found in all three parties. Once he rid himself of his Bavarian advisers, Otto allowed the statutory dissolution of the monasteries to lapse.)
- 1835 On 2 February the Ecumenical Patriarch Constantius II of Constantinople (1834–35) celebrating with 12 bishops and an enormous flood of the faithful, consecrated the rebuilt Church of the Life-Giving Font dedicating it to the Most Holy Theotokos.
- 1837 School of Theology at the National and Capodistrian University of Athens founded. (Note: The National and Kapodistrian University of Athens was founded on 3 May 1837, and consisted of four faculties; theology, law, medicine and arts (which included applied sciences and mathematics).)

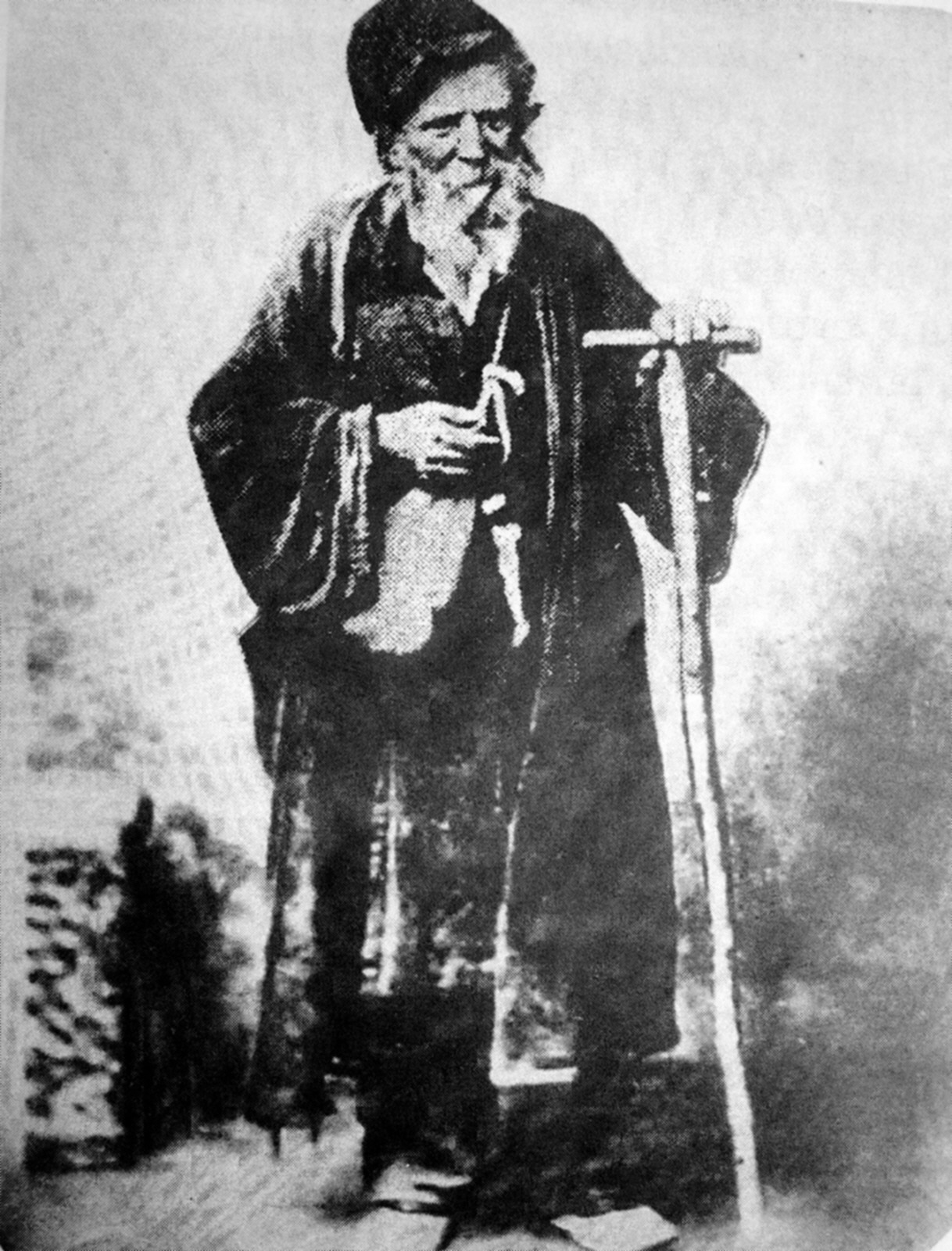
The monk Christophoros Panayiotopoulos (Papoulakos), c. 1770–1861, popular missionary and defender of Orthodoxy.

- 1838 Council of Constantinople held, attended by Patriarchs Gregory VI of Constantinople and Athanasius V of Jerusalem, whose main theme was the Unia, and the extermination of Latin dogmas and usages; death of New Martyr George of Ioannina.
- 1839 Theophilos Kairis of Andros condemned and imprisoned for teaching a form of Deism.
- 1842 Construction of the Metropolitan Cathedral of Athens is begun on Christmas Day, 1842 with the laying of the cornerstone by King Otto and Queen Amalia, dedicated 20 years later on 21 May 1862 in honor of the Annunciation of the Virgin. (Note: "The original plan was drawn up by the Dane Theofil Hansen. It was a mélange of Romanesque, Gothic, Western Renaissance, and finally, Byzantine architecture. This project was revised by the Greek architect Dimitri Zezos, and when the Cathedral was finished in May 1862, it resembled nothing: it was "ecumenical"!")
- 1844 Theological School of Halki founded; Manthos and Georgios Rizaris, benefactors and members of the Filiki Eteria organization, funded the building of the Rizareios Ecclesiastical School in Athens, which continues to function as a religious and educational institution today, based in Halandri, Athens; Prime Minister Ioannis Kolettis first coined the expression the "Great Idea" (Megali Idea), envisaging the restoration of the Christian Orthodox Byzantine Empire with its capital once again established at Constantinople, becoming the core of Greek foreign policy until the early 20th century; (Note: The term appeared for the first time during the debates of Prime Minister Ioannis Kolettis with King Otto that preceded the promulgation of the 1844 constitution.) King Otho I, a Roman Catholic in an Eastern Orthodox country, was forced to grant the Constitution of 1844 (after the rebellion of 3 September 1843), specifying that his eventual successor be Orthodox.
- 1845 Death of priest and scholar Neophytos Doukas, author of a large number of books and translations of ancient Greek works, and one of the most important personalities of the Greek Enlightenment during the Ottoman occupation of Greece.
- 1847 At nearly eighty years of age, the monk Christophoros Panayiotopoulos (Papoulakos) c. 1770–1861, undertook a popular preaching mission in the villages of Achaea to revitalize the spiritual conditions of the people which were slowly becoming westernized with an Enlightenment ideology, affecting the sociological make up of the newborn Greek state within a decade; ultimately Papoulakos helped bring the Greek people back to their roots in Orthodoxy and the Christian ideal, for which he suffered much persecution from both the Church and State and died in exile, and is today renowned as a great ascetic and hero of modern Greece. (Note: "Moving as he did amongst the people and seeing the consequences of the Bavarian government's policies, his preaching turned to contemporary politics. He fiercely denounced the autocephaly and the abolition of ancient metropolitan sees, which left the people shepherd-less. He condemned the dissolution of monasteries, foreign missionaries, and the non-Orthodox schools they had established and the exclusion of the sacred Scriptures (i.e., the Septuagint) from the schools. Behind these acts Papoulakos saw a clear aim: 'It is their purpose to ruin our religion.' And he lists the guilty: the English who controlled the state with their loan; the foreigners, the 'Luthero-Calvinists,' Bavarians and missionaries who were swamping Greece; Kairis, 'who had lit the match;' Pharmakidis, 'who had poured out the poison;' the Synod which had meekly accepted the foreigners' schemes and which Papoulakos calls 'polluted, diabolical, sealed with Armannsperg's seal.' ")
- 1848 Encyclical of the Eastern Patriarchs sent by the primates and synods of the four ancient patriarchates of the Orthodox Church, condemning the Filioque as heresy, declaring the Roman Catholic Church to be heretical, schismatic, and in apostasy, repudiating Ultramontanism (papal supremacy) and referring to the Photian Council of 879–880 as the "Eighth Ecumenical Council."

=== Autocephalous Era (from 1850) ===
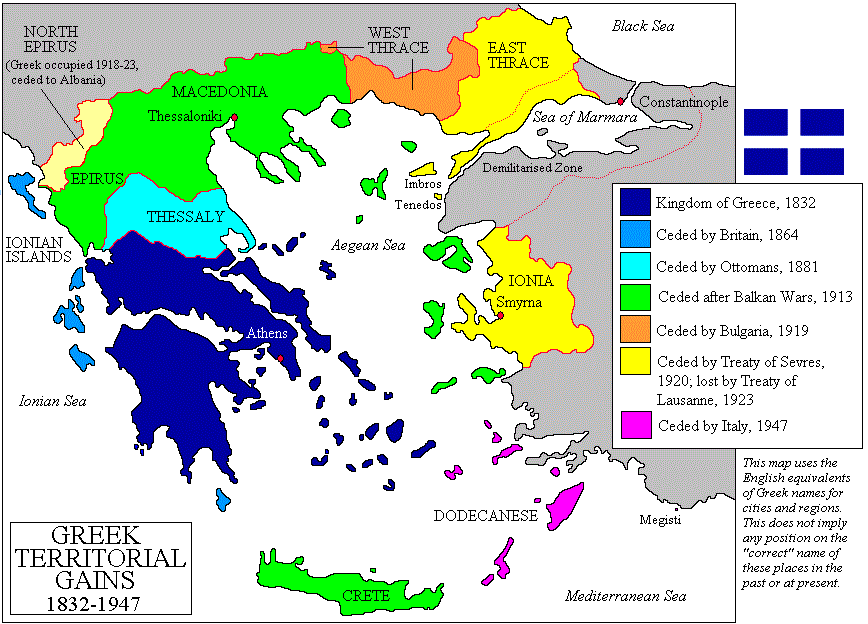
The expansion of Greece from 1832 to 1947, showing territories awarded to Greece in 1919 but lost in 1923.

- 1850 After tortuous and protracted negotiations, the Permanent Synod in Constantinople presided over by Patr. Anthimos IV of Constantinople recognised the autocephaly of the Church of Greece; (Note: "The settlement of this vital question of the fledgling kingdom represented the triumph of the lay state over ecclesiastical authority, and was a reflection of the ideas and principles on which the kingdom was being founded. The newly established Church of Greece was not only made independent of the Ecumenical Patriarchate; by the same token it was also made subservient to the state. Although granted a privileged position in relation to other religious establishments, it was essentially turned into a state entity under the supervision of a ministry; and although the initial Bavarian settlement of the church question was later relaxed to allow it a measure of freedom within the secular state, the head of the Church always had to understand that the Minister of Education and Creeds was his superior. The blow to the authority and prestige of the Ecumenical Patriarchate was severe, but in the light of the requirements of the sovereign nation-state it was unavoidable." For the full text of the Tomos of 1850 see: (in Greek) "Ἀνακήρυξις τοῦ Αὐτοκεφάλου τῆς Ἐκκλησίας τῆς Ἑλλάδος, 29 Ἰουνίου 1850." ΠΑΤΡΙΑΡΧΙΚΟΣ ΚΑΙ ΣΥΝΟΔΙΚΟΣ ΤΟΜΟΣ. Τῆς ἐν Κωνσταντινουπόλει Ἁγίας καὶ Ἱερᾶς Συνόδου, τῆς συγκροτηθείσης ἐν ἔτει ἀπὸ Χριστοῦ Σωτῆρος χιλιοστῷ ὀκτακοσιοστῷ πεντηκοστῷ, ἐν μηνὶ Ἰουνίῳ, Ἰνδικτιῶνος Η', περὶ τῆς ἐν Ἑλλάδι Ὀρθοδόξου Ἐκκλησίας. (Retrieved: 2013-08-27).) due to certain conditions issued in the "Tomos" of autocephaly, the Church of Greece must maintain special links to its "Mother Church", the Ecumenical Patriarchate. (Note: "This tome legalized the Greek Church's unilateral action [of 1833], laying down certain preconditions. Some formal preconditions were honored, but none of the essential ones.")

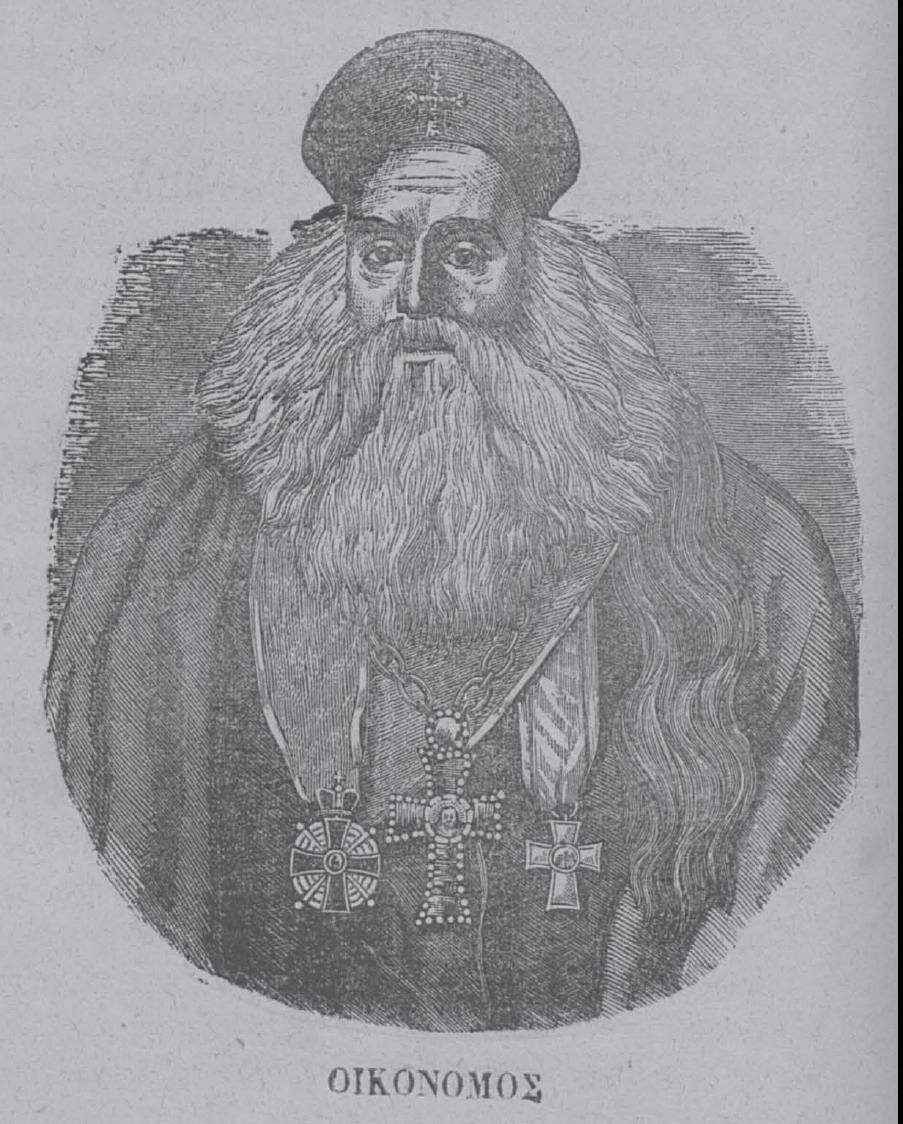
Konstantinos Oikonomos (1780–1857), Greek presbyter, oikonomos, scholar and traditionalist.

- 1852 By Law 201 (Grk.: ΣΑ') of 1852, the Greek government, ignoring reference to the Patriarchal Tome of 1850, revised certain articles of the Pharmakidis-Maurer Church constitution (of 1833), however without changing the Church's subjection to the state; (Note: (in Greek) "Η ελληνική Πολιτεία προτίμησε να συμμορφωθεί προς το Σύνταγμά της, του 1844, το οποίο στο άρθρο 3 αναγνώριζε ήδη την Εκκλησία της Ελλάδος ως αυτοκέφαλη και στο άρθρο 105 προέβλεπε την έκδοση ειδικών νόμων για τη ρύθμιση εκκλησιαστικών ζητημάτων. Ετσι, το 1852, εκδόθηκαν δύο νόμοι, οι νόμοι Σ' και ΣΑ', που ουσιαστικώς παγίωσαν, αν και σε πιο εκλεπτυσμένη μορφή, την πολιτειοκρατία στην Εκκλησία της Ελλάδος.") liberal Greek theologian Theoklitos Pharmakidis, a proponent of the ideas of Adamantios Korais and the Greek Enlightenment, published The Synodal Tomos or Concerning Truth, a strong attack on the conditions found in the Tomos of Autocephaly of 1850, arguing that there was nothing uncanonical about the establishment set up in 1833, and stating that: "the Eastern Church is everywhere joined to the state, never being separated from it, never divided from the sovereigns since Byzantine times, and always subordinate to them."
- 1853 At the start of the Crimean War (1853–1856), fought ostensibly over which church would be recognized as the "sovereign authority" of the Christian faith in the Holy Land and Russia's claim of protection over the Greek Christians in the Turkish Empire, the French Roman Catholic Abp. of Paris Marie-Dominique-Auguste Sibour stated that this was a holy war against the Orthodox. (Note: "It is a sacred deed, a God-pleasing deed, to ward off the Photian heresy [Orthodoxy], subjugate it and destroy it with a new crusade. This is the clear goal of today's crusade. Such was the goal of all the crusades, even if all their participants were not fully aware of it. The war which France is now preparing to wage against Russia is not a political war but a holy war. It is not a war between two governments or between two peoples, but is precisely a religious war, and other reasons presented are only pretexts.")
- 1854-1859 Piraeus was occupied by the Anglo-French fleet to ensure Greek neutrality during the Crimean War (1853–56) and to forestall Greek expansionist intentions.
- 1855 The Holy Cross School of Jerusalem (Theological School of the Patriarchal Throne of Jerusalem) is founded under Patriarch Cyril II of Jerusalem, located at the Monastery of the Holy Cross, functioning for about fifty years with some interruptions (1855–1909).
- 1856 Death of Neophytos Vamvas, Greek cleric and educator who had translated the Bible into Modern Greek.
- 1857 Death of Konstantinos Oikonomos, by common consensus the most important 19th-century Greek churchman and theologian, being the only person to criticize the Bavarian regime on an intellectual level, and an implacable opponent of Pharmakidis' theological ideals, symbolizing Greece's ecclesiastical consciousness at that time; (Note: See: (in Greek) Κωνσταντίνος Οικονόμου ο εξ Οικονόμων. Βικιπαίδεια. (Greek Wikipedia).) in March 1857, when Konstantinos III was still enthroned as the Greek Metropolitan of Trebizond, 150 Crypto-Christian village leaders of Kromni, Santa, Koasi and other regions went to the Panagia Theoskepastos Monastery in Trebizond, and inside the church took an oath to reveal their Christianity and remain faithful in the face of exile or death, thus openly declaring their Orthodox Christian faith. (Note: "A report of the British sub-consul A. Stevens in 1857 addressed to the British ambassador Stanford regarding the Kromni district in Pontus, stated that in 55 villages, 9,535 Muslims resided there, 17,260 Crypto-Christians and 28,960 Christian Greeks. Gervassios the Bishop of Sevastia made reference to the Crypto-Christians of Asia Minor by saying that, after European interventions there in the year 1858, 25,000 of them confessed publicly their Christian creed. The return to Christianity by these Ottoman subjects frightened the authorities who followed the developments with great unease.")
- 1857–66 J.P. Migne produces the Patrologia Graeca in 162 volumes, including both the Eastern Fathers and those Western authors who wrote before Ecclesiastical Latin became predominant in the Western Church in the 3rd century.
- 1860 The Ottoman Government tries to intervene in Athonite affairs with a constitution drawn up by Hushni Pasha, the Governor of Thessaloniki.
- 1863 George I enthroned as King of Greece, whose long reign (1863–1913) was the formative period for the development of Greece as a modern European state.
- 1864 Holy Trinity Church (New Orleans, LA) becomes the first Orthodox parish to be established on American soil, by Greeks; the Ionian Islands (Eptanisa) are united with Greece, and were transferred in 1866 to the jurisdiction of the Greek Church from Constantinople.

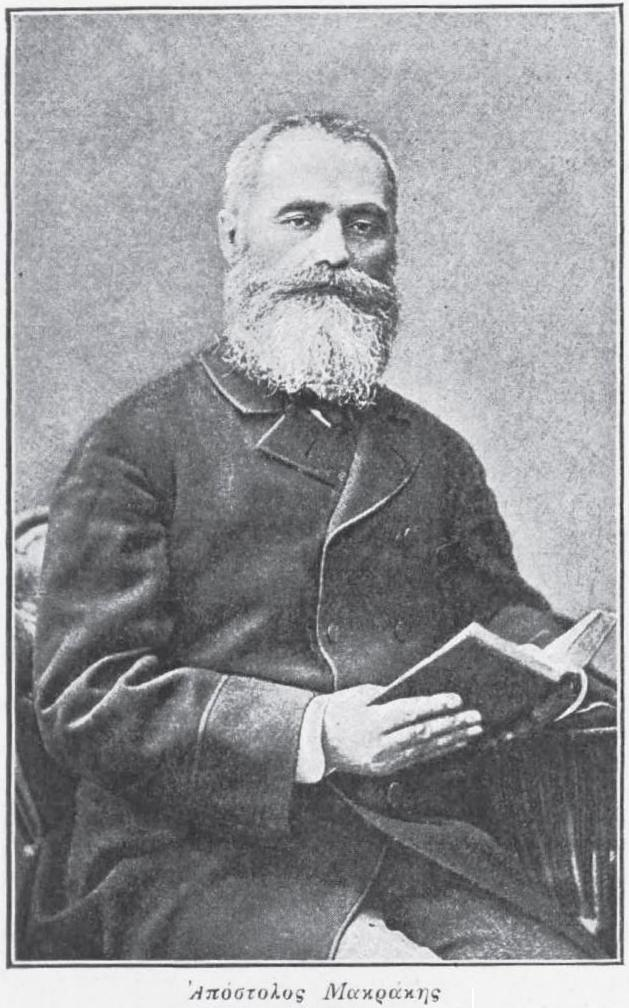
Apostolos Makrakis (1831–1905). Greek lay theologian, preacher, ethicist, philosopher and writer, and a leader of the awakening movement in post-revolutionary Greece.

- 1865-94 Renowned Russian Byzantologist Archimandrite Antonin (Kapustin) heads the Russian Ecclesiastical Mission in the Holy Land, under whose tenure the Mission significantly expanded its presence in Palestine, acquiring multiple properties in an effort to preserve Orthodox Christian holy places and care for the needs of the many pilgrims flocking to the region. (Note: Among other properties Fr. Antonin acquired the land on which the Oak of Mamre stands, the summit of the Mount of Olives, and the tomb of St. Tabitha in Jaffa.)
- 1866 Beginning of the Great Cretan Revolution (1866–1869), officially proclaimed on 21 August 1866; the holocaust of Arkadi Monastery in Crete; charismatic Greek Orthodox lay theologian, preacher, ethicist and writer Apostolos Makrakis came to Athens, where for six months he delivered twenty speeches in Concord Square on the subject of 'The Work of the Fathers of 1821 and How it Can Best and Quickest Be Brought to a Conclusion' , which were published in the newspaper Justice, and republished in book form in 1886.
- 1871 Body of Patr. Gregory V returned to Athens and entombed in cathedral. (Note: (in Greek) "Τὸ 1871 ἡ Ἐκκλησία τῆς Ἑλλάδος θεώρησε ἐπιβεβλημένο νὰ μετακομίσει τὸ τίμιο λείψανό του ἀπὸ τὴν Ὁδησσὸ τῆς Ρωσίας στὴν ἀπελεύθερη Ἀθήνα.")
- 1872 Council of Constantinople (Pan-Orthodox Synod) is convened and presided over by Ecumenical Patriarch Anthimus VI, and attended by Patriarchs Sophronius IV of Alexandria and Procopius II of Jerusalem and several bishops, condemning phyletism (ethnocentric belief that Orthodox Christians in a given place and time should be divided into separate exarchates, based on ethnicity), and condemning the Bulgarian Exarchate; the decisions of this council are later accepted by the other local Orthodox Churches.
- 1873 Philotheos Bryennios discovers the Didache in manuscript with copies of several early Church documents. (Note: While in Constantinople, he discovered a manuscript in the Jerusalem Monastery of the Most Holy Sepulcher (in the Greek quarter of Constantinople), which contained a synopsis of the Old and New Testaments arranged by St. Chrysostom, the Epistle of Barnabas, the First Epistle of Clement to the Corinthians, the Second Epistle of Clement to the Corinthians, the Teaching of the Twelve Apostles (Didache), the spurious letter of Mary of Cassoboli, and twelve pseudo-Ignatian Epistles. The letters were published in 1875, and the Didache in 1883.)
- 1874 Death of Venerable Joseph Gerontogiannis, ascetic of Crete.
- 1875 Giovanni Marango (Grk: Ιωάννης Μαραγκός) is installed as a Roman Catholic Archbishop in Athens, being the first Roman hierarch in Athens since 1458, when Niccolò Protimo of Euboea (the last Latin titular Archbishop of Athens) departed; a Patriarchal and Synodal Decision was sent to all Bishops everywhere, whereby the manner of reception of Latin converts was left to the judgement of the local Bishops.
- 1877 Death of Arsenios of Paros.
- 1878 Council of Athens, convened and presided over by Metr. Procopius I of Athens, condemned the Makrakists, obtaining closure of Apostolos Makrakis' "School of the Logos" on the pretext that it taught doctrines opposed to the tenets of the Church, and addressed an encyclical to the whole body of Christians in Greece that was read in the churches, charging Makrakis with attempting to introduce innovations; (Note: Apostolos Makrakis was a highly cultured layman and patriotic visionary whose vigorous religious movement became a popular phenomenon that shook the religious and national establishment of his time. From believing that he had been divinely chosen as the liberator of Byzantium from the Turk, to his preaching tours throughout Greece focusing on Soteriology, advocating his unique and controversial Christological-Philosophical teachings, to his fight against Freemasonry and Simony, he effectively became a leader of the awakening religious and national movement in modern Greece. In the process he also became a symbol for the freedom of religious thought and expression. However in openly combating Freemasonry he was opposing certain elements within the State; and in combating Simony he was opposing certain elements within the Church. Therefore he naturally incurred enemies from both Church and State.) Cyprus is ceded to Britain by Ottoman Empire at the Congress of Berlin.

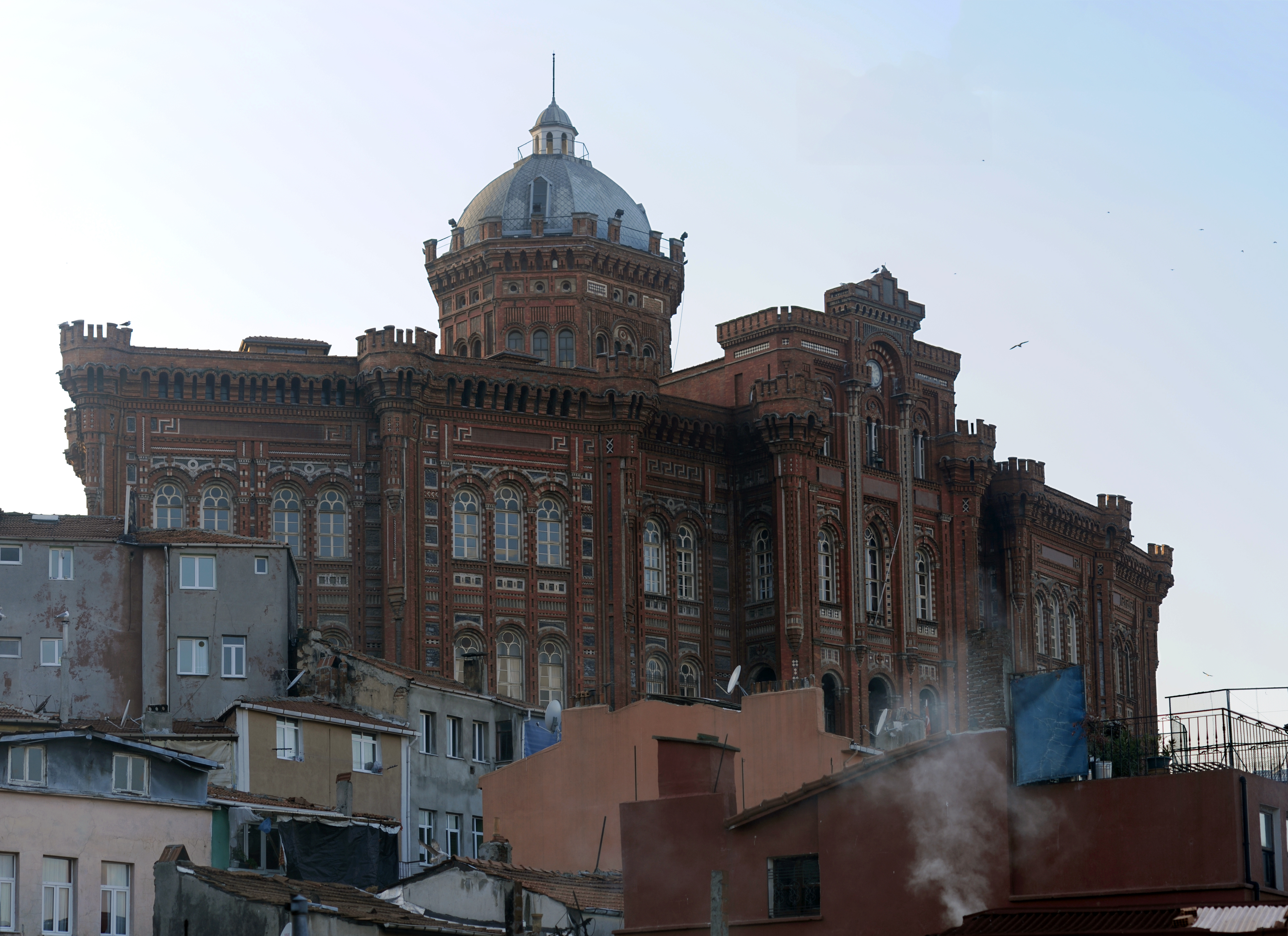
The Great School of the Nation.

- 1880–1917 Emigration of approximately 400,000 Greeks to the United States, many as hired labor for the railroads and mines of the American West.
- 1881–1883 During the patriarchate of Joachim III, the Great School of the Nation was housed in a new large building in the area of the Phanar. (Note: Designed by the Ottoman Greek architect Konstantinos Dimadis, the building was erected between 1881 and 1883 with an eclectic mix of different styles and at a cost of 17,210 Ottoman gold pounds, a huge sum for that period. The money was given by Georgios Zariphis, a prominent Greek Ottoman banker and financier belonging to the Rum community of Istanbul.)

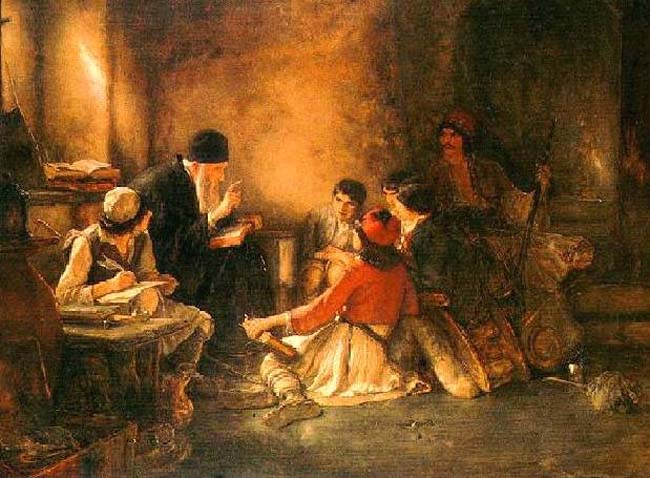
Nicholaos Gysis, "The Secret school", Oil painting, 1885/86.

- 1882 Thessaly and part of Epirus added to the Church of Greece, after the Ottomans cede Thessali and Arta regions to Greece (1881).
- 1885 Prominent Greek painter Nicholaos Gysis paints the famous "Secret school" ("κρυφό σχολειό"), referring to the underground schools provided by the Greek Orthodox Church in monasteries and churches during the time of Ottoman rule in Greece (15th–19th centuries) for keeping alive Orthodox Christian doctrines and Greek language and literacy.
- 1888 Typikon of the Great Church of Christ is published with revised church services, prepared by Protopsaltis George Violakis, issued with the approval and blessing of the Ecumenical Patriarch, while the Sabaite (monastic) Typikon continued to be used in the Church of Russia; (Note: The Sabaite Typikon had been published in its final form in Russia in 1682. Thus from 1682 to 1888 the Greek and Russian Churches had shared this common Typikon. (The Typikon that was originally introduced into the Rus' lands by Theodosius of the Kiev Caves (d. 1074), was that of Patriarch Alexius I Studites, who in 1034 AD wrote the first complete Studite Typikon , for a monastery he established near Constantinople).) Council of Constantinople, convened and presided over by Patriarch Dionysius V, and attended by several bishops, permits the reception of Western converts to Orthodoxy by the rite of Chrismation as an act of economia (dispensation) in extreme circumstances; death of Venerable Saint Panagis of Lixouri (Cephalonia).
- 1889 German Protestant historian Ferdinand Gregorovius writes "History of Athens in the Middle Ages. From Justinian to the Turkish Conquest." (Stuttgart, 1889).
- 1891 Death of Greek historian and Byzantinist Constantine Paparrigopoulos, considered the founder of modern Greek historiography, who analysed Greek history from the ancient era to the present age as a continuous history in his multi-volume History of the Hellenic Nation (6 vols, 1860–1877), also known for his original research in Byzantine history.
- 1894 On 8 March, Nektarios of Pentapolis was appointed Dean of the Rizarios Ecclesiastical School, remaining as Dean until 1908, becoming a spiritual guide to many; (Note: The Rizarios Hieratical School was named in honour of Manthos and Georgios Rizaris, Greek benefactors, merchants and members of the organization Filiki Eteria, who founded it. The school had begun to function in 1844.) Apostolos Makrakis made his tenth and last Gospel tour, visiting Thebes, St. Theodore, Levadeia, Atalante, Chalkis, Kyme, Aliverion, Kariston, Gaurion on the islands of Andros, Syros, and his birthplace Siphnos.
- 1895 Council of Constantinople, convened and presided over by Patriarch Anthimus VII, and attended by 13 bishops, condemns all the Franco-Latin heresies, including the new false dogma of the so-called Immaculate Conception of the Virgin Mary by St. Anne, and the blasphemous teaching that the pope is supposedly infallible and undeposable.
- 1897 Greco-Turkish War (1897).
- 1899 Council of Constantinople, convened and presided over by Ecumenical Patriarch Constantine V, and attended by several bishops, deposes the newly elected Patriarch Meletius II (Doumani) of Antioch, on the grounds of phyletism, due to the fact that the latter had been elected by an anti-Greek, pro-Arab party within the Antiochene Patriarchate, a similar party to that which caused the Melkite schism of 1724 (Note: In 1724, Patriarch Athanasius III Dabbas of Antioch died naming as his successor Sylvester, his former deacon. In opposition, the faction favoring union with the Roman Catholic Church elected Seraphim Tanas patriarch of Antioch as Cyril VI. Patr. Jeremias III of Constantinople declared Cyril's election invalid and consecrated Sylvester as Patriarch of Antioch. These events formalized a schism within the Church of Antioch, after which the pro-Rome group became known as the Melkite Greek Catholic Church / Greek-Melkite Catholic Patriarchate of Antioch, adopting the term Melkite to identify themselves, whereas the non-Melkites refer to themselves as the Greek Orthodox Patriarchate of Antioch.) and subsequent union with the Latins.

Map of the Greek Orthodox Metropolises in Asia Minor (Anatolia) c. 1880.

- 19th century Statistical figures for the population of Anatolia (Asia Minor) in the 19th century show that Christians constituted a minority of considerable importance: of the 12,254,459 total inhabitants, 9,676,714 (78.96%) were Muslim, and 2,350,272 (19.2%) were Christian, of which the Greek Orthodox element amounted to 1,016,722 or 8.3%. (Note: In these statistics the Muslim element appears preponderant, but the percentage of Christians has almost tripled when compared to the figures of the early 16th century (when the ratio was 92% to 7.9%).)
- 1901 Evangelika riots in Athens Greece in November, over translations of the New Testament into Demotic (Modern) Greek, resulting in the fall of both the government and Metropolitan of Athens, and withdrawal of publications from circulation. (Note: "Serious riots have occurred at Athens, arising out of a students' demonstration against the movement for translating the Scriptures into modern Greek. The military were called out, and seven people were killed and 30 injured in a charge. The Premier, who witnessed the disturbances, was fired at, but uninjured. Troops are now guarding the public buildings." (See also: el:Ευαγγελικά (in Greek))) (Note: "The Greek Church is very jealous of any attempt at publishing a "Revised Version" of the Holy Scriptures. Warned by the experience of the "Gospel Riots" of 1901, when the Theotokes Cabinet fell over the question of the translation of the Gospels into a form of the vernacular, the present Constitution ordains that "the text of the Holy Scriptures remains unchanged.")
- 1902 Theocletus I (Minopoulos) becomes Metropolitan of Athens (1902–1917); (Note: A monarchist is his politics, Theocletus I became metropolitan in a period of Greece's wars with Ottoman Turkey and jockeying between supporting the Allies or the Central Powers in the period before World War I. A supporter of King Constantine I of Greece, Theocletus became embroiled in the struggle between King Constantine, who desired to remain neutral, and the Greek prime minister Eleftherios Venizelos, who supported joining the Allies. In opposing Venizelos, Metr. Theocletus went so far as to excommunicate him at a ceremony in Athens on 25 December 1916. As a result, when Constantine was forced from the throne in 1917, Metr. Theocletus came under attack from the Venizelos supporters and was uncanonically deposed on 11 October 1917, "for having instigated the anathema against Eleutherius Venizelos". In his place another Cretan, Meletius Metaxakis, a known supporter of Venizelos, was enthroned as Metropolitan of Athens on 13 March 1918.) Church of Greece takes responsibility for Greek Orthodox parishes in Australasia from the Church of Jerusalem. (Note: In the preliminary stages the Greek Orthodox people in Australia had developed warm relations with the Greek Orthodox Patriarchate of Jerusalem, which up until 1902 provided the priests, service books, and sacred vessels. The first priests sent from Jerusalem in 1898 were Fr. Seraphim Phokas for Sydney and Fr. Athanasios Kantopoulos for Melbourne. Thereafter, the Holy Synod of the Church of Greece took up the administration of the Greek Orthodox communities and provided their priests, with the consent of the Patriarchate of Jerusalem, from 1903, and the Ecumenical Patriarchate of Constantinople from 1908.)
- 1904 Ecumenical Patriarchate publishes the Patriarchal Text, based on about twenty Byzantine manuscripts, the standard text of the Greek-speaking Orthodox churches today. (Note: In 1935, German Biblical scholar Alfred Rahlfs published his two-volume Septuaginta, a semi-critical edition of the Greek Septuagint, being the only complete critical text of the Septuagint in existence to that date. Rahlfs' text was based on the principles of reconstructing the text conceptualized by him and Lagarde. It was, however, only a preliminary critical edition, inasmuch as Rahlfs realized that it would be impossible in his lifetime to take into account the textual evidence of the many hundreds of existing manuscripts and relevant subsequent translations of the Septuagint. So he undertook to base the text he reconstructed primarily on the three great uncial manuscripts of the fourth and fifth centuries A.D., Vaticanus, Sinaiticus, and Alexandrinus.)

Monastery of Agios Nectarios, built c. 1904–1910 by the Bishop of Pentapoleos Nektarios; still under construction today, it is one of the largest churches in Greece.

- 1904–1910 Nektarios of Pentapolis began building the Convent of the Holy Trinity on the island of Aegina, while yet Dean of the Rizarios Hieratical School (until 1908).
- 1905 Death of Apostolos Makrakis; death of Elder Pachomios of Chios, founder of the Skete of the Holy Fathers in Chios (Cloister of Aghion Pateron), as well as the spiritual guide of St. Nektarios of Pentapolis (†1920) and St. Anthimos (Vagianos) of Chios (†1960), and an opponent of syncretistic ecumenism. (Note: Her was canonized by the Old Calendarist Church of the Genuine Orthodox Christians of Greece in October 2014.)

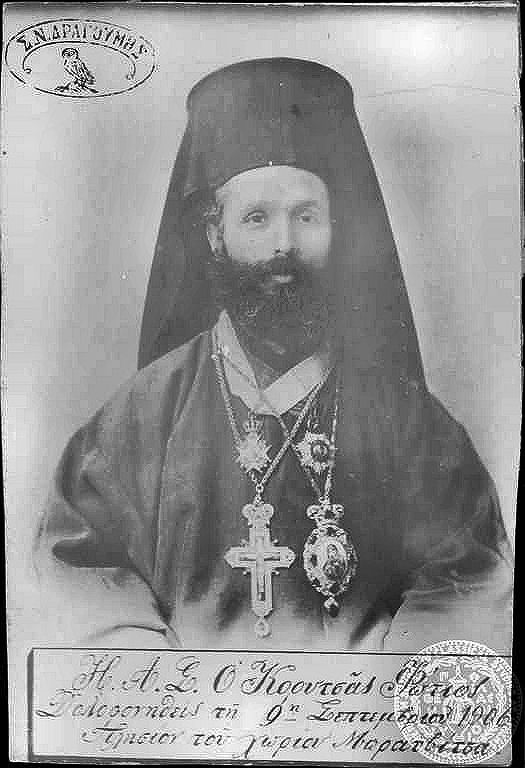
Ethnomartyr Metr. Photios Kalpidis of Korytsa and Premeti (1902–1906).

- 1906 Assassination of Metr. Photios Kalpidis of Korytsa and Premeti (1902–1906), Ethnomartyr.
- 1907 Foundation of Zoe Brotherhood, an extra-ecclesiastical organization founded by Archim. Eusebius Matthopoulos (1849–1929); (Note: "The most important para-ecclesial organization was the Zoe Brotherhood of Theologians. Founded in 1907 by Mattopoulos, Zoe became a centralized organization of dedicated members whose immense influence impacted the ecclesiastical, social, political and spiritual life of Greece for the next fifty years.") ordination in Constantinople of Fr. Raphael Morgan, "Priest-Apostolic to America and the West Indies" (Ιεραποστολος), and the first African-American Orthodox priest.
- 1908 Death of Methodia of Kimolos; the Church of Greece was temporarily given jurisdiction of the Greek Church in America (1908–1922) and the Greek Church in Australia (1908–1924) under an agreement made between the Ecumenical Patriarchate of Constantinople and the Holy Synod of Athens; Nektarios of Pentapolis took up permanent residence on Aegina, where he spent the last years of his life, devoting himself to the direction of his convent and to very intense prayer.

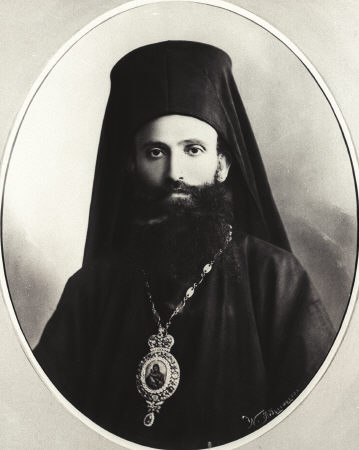
Hieromartyr Aimilianos Lazaridis, Metropolitan of Grevena (†1911).

- 1911 Assassination of Aimilianos Lazaridis (el), Metropolitan of Grevena.
- 1912 Kyriopascha occurs; Balkan Wars (1912–1913); Council of Constantinople, convened and presided over by Patriarch Joachim III, and attended by several bishops, condemns the Onomatodoxi (name-worshippers), who believed that the name of God is God Himself; ratification of the new General Regulations governing Mount Athos, which was drawn up by Patriarch Joachim III and the Athonite monks; in November, the Holy Mountain was liberated by the Greek fleet.
- 1913 The Athonite monks pass a resolution declaring the administrative autonomy of the Monastic State, within the Greek State; after Cretan deputies unilaterally declared union with Greece in 1908, Crete is finally ceded to Greece by the Treaty of London (1913), which ended the First Balkan War; Epirus, Macedonia and the eastern Aegean Islands are liberated as per the Treaty of Bucharest (1913), coming under the administration of the Greek Church, but remaining under the nominal authority of the Patriarch of Constantinople.
- 1914–18 World War I. (Note: "Greece's attitude toward the war was long uncertain: whereas King Constantine I and the general staff stood for neutrality, Eleuthérios Venizélos, leader of the Liberal Party, favoured the Allied cause. As prime minister from 1910, Venizélos wanted Greece to participate in the Allies' Dardanelles enterprise against Turkey in 1915, but his arguments were overruled by the general staff. The Allies occupied Lemnos and Lesbos regardless of Greece's neutrality. Constantine dismissed Venizélos from office twice in 1915, but Venizélos still commanded a majority in Parliament. The Bulgarians' occupation of Greek Macedonia in summer 1916 provoked another political crisis. Venizélos left Athens for Crete late in September, set up a government of his own there, and transferred it early in October to Salonika. On 27 November it declared war on Germany and Bulgaria. Finally, the Allies, on 11 June 1917, deposed King Constantine. Venizélos then returned to Athens to head a reunified Greek government, which on 27 June declared war on the Central Powers.")
- 1914 According to the Corfu Protocol of 17 May 1914, Northern Epirus is granted autonomy within Albania; Byzantine & Christian Museum is founded in Athens, becoming one of the most important museums in the world in Byzantine Art.

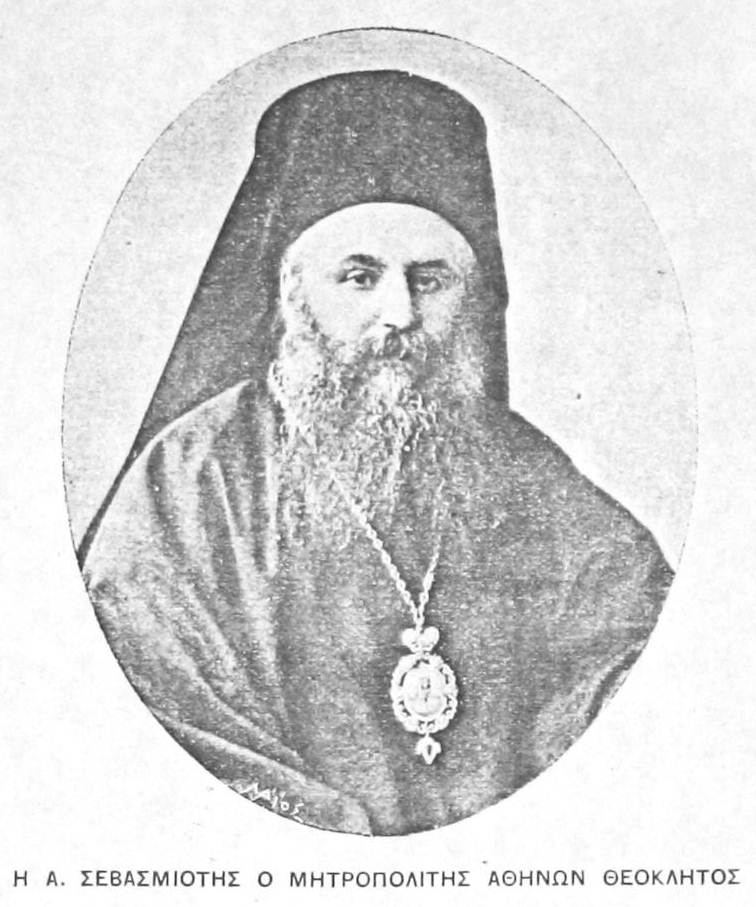
Metropolitan Theocletus I (Minopoulos) (1902–1917, 1920–1922).

- 1914-23 Greek genocide eliminates the Greek Orthodox population of Anatolia, with approximately 750,000 Greeks of Asia Minor massacred and another 750,000 exiled. (Note: "Of the 1.5 million Greeks of Asia minor – Ionians, Pontians, and Cappadocians – approximately 750,000 were massacred and 750,000 exiled. Pontian deaths alone totaled 353,000." However, Crypto-Greek Orthodox are reported in many parts of Asia Minor and in the Ottoman occupied Balkans. A good account of the Crypto-christians of Pontos and a bibliography regarding other places is given by F. W. Hasluck.)
- 1916 In a long letter to the President of the Council dated 10/23 November 1916, liberal politician Andreas Michalakopoulos (one of Eleftherios Venizelos' most important colleagues), expounded the necessity of a profound reform of the Greek Church, the objective of which was its complete Westernization; (Note: "The eminently anti-Orthodox character of Michalakopoulos' proposals can be better grasped if one calls to mind that the essential difference, since 1054, between Eastern and Western Christianity, according to the defenders of the former, is that "Orthodoxy is lived," he Orthodoxia bionetai; it is lived and not thought, contrary to Catholicism and Protestantism. Consequently, the heart, which is the center of the spirit, prevails over the mind; the Typikon (that is, the rule for religious rituals) is more important than preaching. For the Orthodox, it is nonsense to replace fasting with good deeds under the pretext that the latter are more useful socially.") during the National Schism that had divided Greece, Archbishop Theokletos I of Athens (1848–1931) anathematized and excommunicated Eleftherios Venizelos in one of the most memorable events of Greek history, on 12 December 1916.
- 1917 Metr. Theocletus I is deposed, as the hierarchy of the Greek Church changed in accordance with political control of the country; (Note: In 1917 French and British forces occupied Piraeus, bombarded Athens and forced the Greek fleet to surrender. King Constantine I resigned and left the country. His second son Alexander became King Alexander I, and Venizelos was restored as Prime Minister in Athens. When Constantine was forced from the throne in 1917, Metr. Theocletus I came under attack from the Venizelos supporters and was uncanonically deposed on 11 October 1917, "for having instigated the anathema against Eleutherius Venizelos". In his place another Cretan, Meletius Metaxakis, a known supporter of Venizelos, was enthroned as Metropolitan of Athens on 13 March 1918.) in the Pafra region of Western Pontus, a large force of the Turkish army sent by Refet Bele Pasha and commanded by Mehmet Ali besieged the monastery of the Theotokos (Note: (in Greek) "Ματωμένη σπηλιά στη Μονή Βλέπουσας Παναγιάς". The monastery was located within the cave called Maara (the "Virgin or Magara", Παναγίας Μάγαρας) on the west side of Mount Neltes (Nebyan), near the village of Otkaya.) from 17 to 21 April 1917, killing approximately 650 women and children, and 60 armed Pontian insurgents. (Note: (in Greek) "...Ο καπετάνιος Χατζηγιώργης Καραβασίλογλου μαζί με 80 αντάρτες και 600 γυναικόπαιδα πολιορκούμενοι από τον Τουρκικό στρατό στις 17-21 Απρίλη του 1917 στην Ματωμένη σπηλιά στη Μονή Βλέπουσας Παναγιάς στο χωριό Ότκαγια, μόλις τους τελειώνουν τα πυρομαχικά πολεμούν σώμα με σώμα και πριν σκοτωθεί και ο τελευταίος σηκώνει την λευκή σημαία για να σωθούν τα γυναικόπαιδα. Λουτρό αίματος ακολουθεί όταν οι Τούρκοι ανακαλύπτουν τα γυναικόπαιδα στο βάθος της σπηλιάς. 100 περίπου σφάζονται και βιάζονται ενώ όσα επιζούν αιχμαλωτίζονται. Η μάχη αυτή αποτέλεσε ιστορικά το νεότερο ΑΡΚΑΔΙ του Ποντιακού Αντάρτικου.")
- 1918 Meletius III (Metaxakis) becomes Metropolitan of Athens (1918–1920); Allied Occupation of Constantinople (1918–1923); the "St. Sophia Redemption Committee" is formed in Britain after the Armistice, whose members included two future Foreign Secretaries and many prominent public figures, seeking to restore Hagia Sophia into an Orthodox Church (1918–1922); Roman Catholic opposition to the St Sophia Redemption Committee included Msgr. Manuel Bidwell (Chancellor of the Archdiocese of Westminster) who was on the initial committee, Roman Catholic British MP Sir Stuart Coats also on the committee, Cardinal Pietro Gasparri the Papal Secretary of State, and the Vatican who wished to block St. Sophia becoming a Greek Orthodox Church (according to the Grand Vizier of Constantinople who had an offer of Papal support). (Note: Coats pointed out that in 1453 Constantinople had officially been in communion with Rome as a Uniate church. As such, he argued, St. Sophia should continue as a Greek Rite Uniate Church. Cardinal Gaspari gave an interview to the French press while in Paris to observe the peace negotiations, explaining that from Rome's viewpoint the great church had been catholic longer than anything else, being only in schismatic hands from the time of Michael Cerularius to the Council of Florence. The Grand Vizier of Constantinople indicated to the British that he had an offer of Papal support, as the Vatican wished to block St. Sophia becoming a Greek Orthodox Church. The Rev. J.A. Douglas, a member of the Redemption Committee reported that: " 'The traditional diplomacy of the Vatican has certainly laboured for decades under the influence of what would happen if the Oecumenical Patriarch, a dangerous witness against Roman claims, even when half-buried in the slum of the Phanar and paralysed by Turkish tyranny, should emerge and be the symbol of a great and progressive Communion which functioned with glorious St. Sophia as its mother church.' ")

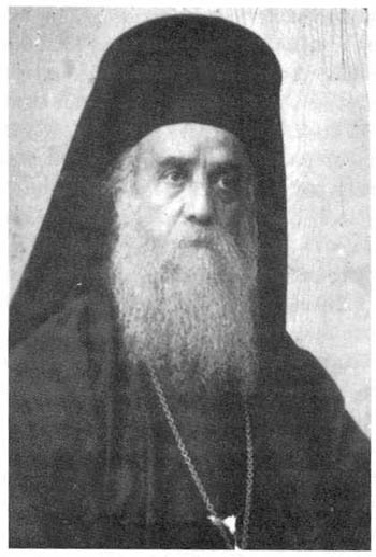
Saint Nektarios of Aegina, Metropolitan of Pentapolis and Wonderworker of Aegina (†1920).

- 1918–1924 Emigration of 70,000 Greeks to the United States, many of which were de jure denaturalized from Anatolia.
- 1919–1922 Greco-Turkish War.
- 1920 Death of Nektarios of Pentapolis (Aegina); (Note: St. Nektarios lived on Aegina for 13 years, and was buried in the precinct of the church that he founded.) Chrysanthos (Philippidis), Bp. of Trebizond is condemned to death in absentia by a Court Martial in Ankara; (Note: On 20 September 1921, he was condemned to death in absentia by the Independence Court of Kemal Ataturk that had already sent 69 Greek notables to the gallows after summary proceedings.) Dodecanese Islands ceded to Greece under the Treaty of Sèvres, but treaty is never ratified; the Italian administration attempted a forcible Latinisation of the people of the Dodecanese Islands, with spoken Greek and Greek Orthodox observances being banned in public from 1920; (Note: "The Dodecanese were taken by Italy in 1912. Under the Treaty of Sèvres in 1920, the Dodecanese were ceded to Greece along with Smyrna and part of the Anatolian hinterland, but the treaty was never ratified, and with the Lausanne Treaty of 1923 the islands were placed under Italian sovereignty. The Italian administration attempted a forcible Latinisation of the people, and spoken Greek and Greek Orthodox observances were banned in public from 1920.") Treaty of Sèvres cedes Eastern Thrace and Ionia (Zone of Smyrna) to Greece, as well as Greek control over the Aegean islands commanding the Dardanelles, but is superseded in 1923 by the Treaty of Lausanne by which these areas were again lost; publication of Encyclical Letter by Constantinople entitled "Unto the Churches of Christ Everywhere", on the subject of Christian unity and the Ecumenical Movement, criticized as ecumenistic ecclesiology.

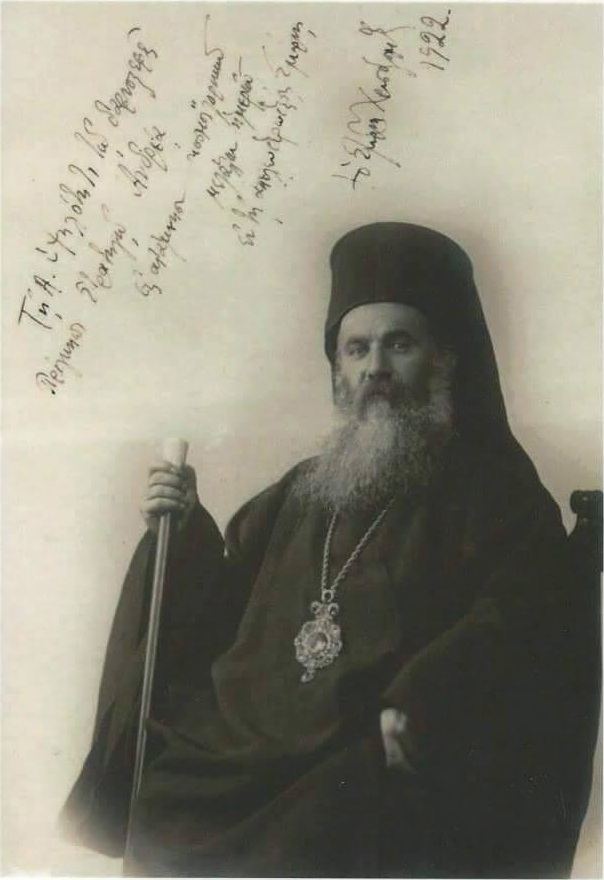
Saint Chrysostomos metropolitan of Smyrna (1910–1922).

- 1921 Greek Orthodox Archdiocese of America formally founded; (Note: The Greek Orthodox Archdiocese of North and South America was incorporated in 1921 and officially recognized by the State of New York in 1922. In 1908, the Church of Greece had received authority over the Greek Orthodox congregation of America, but in 1922 Patriarch Meletius IV of Constantinople transferred the archdiocese back to the jurisdiction of the Church of Constantinople.) by a decision of the Kemalist government, all the Metropolitans, Bishops, and Archimandrites of the Pontus region were obliged to abandon Pontus and leave their seats; death of Hieromartyr Euthymios (Agritellis) of Zela, last resident Bishop of the Diocese of Zela in Western Pontus.
- 1922 All Dioceses within the Greek Kingdom are elevated to Metropolises; (Note: (in Greek) "Με το άρθρο 2 του Ν. 2891/21-7-1922 (ΦΕΚ 124/25-7-1922, τ. Α'), όλες οι Επισκοπές της χώρας ανυψώθηκαν σε Μητροπόλεις, ενώ στον Μητροπολίτη Αθηνών δόθηκε ο τίτλος «Μακαριώτατος Υπέρτιμος και Έξαρχος πάσης της Ελλάδος».) Asia Minor Catastrophe ensues after the Greek army is routed at the Battle of Dumlupınar (Μάχη του Τουμλού Μπουνάρ), the last battle in the Greco-Turkish War (1919–22), marking the beginning of the end for the Greek presence in Anatolia; death of martyr Metr. Chrysostomos (Kalafatis) of Smyrna, lynched by a Turkish mob incited by Nureddin Pasha on Sunday 10 September; martyrdom of Metr. Gregory (Orologas) of Kydonies, Ethno-Hieromartyr; martyrdom of Metr. Ambrosios (Pleianthidis) of Moschonisia, Ethno-Hieromartyr; the predominantly Orthodox Christian city of Smyrna is destroyed, ending 1,900 years of Christian civilization, and a 3,000-year-old Greek presence in the area; (Note: Ionia was settled by the Greeks probably during the 11th century BC.) in September 1922 the schismatic Turkish Orthodox Church is formed in Kayseri by Euthymios Karahisarithis ("Papa Efthim"), a supporter of Turkish nationalists, with the backing of Kemal Atatürk. (Note: "The idea of establishing a separate patriarchate for the Turkish-speaking Cappadocian Orthodox ("Karamanlides") emerged in 1917, after the diplomatic relations with Greece ceased during the rule of Union and Progress. The project was shelved after Turkey was defeated in the war and revived after Smyrna's occupation and the cooperation of the Patriarchate with the occupation forces. In 1921, the Council of Ministers in Ankara accepted a decree establishing a "Turkish Orthodox Church" and Papa Efthim was placed at its head. On 21 September 1922 the "Independent Turkish Orthodox Patriarchate" was established in Caesarea.")

- 1923 Death of the Prokopios Lazaridis, Metropolitan of Iconium, by poisoning after being imprisoned by Turks in Kayseri prisons; by decision of the Holy Synod, the title "Metropolitan of Athens" became "Archbishop of Athens and All Greece"; (Note: (in Greek) "Με τον Καταστατικό Νόμο της Εκκλησίας της Ελλάδος της 31ης Δεκεμβρίου 1923 (ΦΕΚ 387 τ. Α'), που καταρτίσθηκε μετά την εκλογή, χειροτονία και εγκατάσταση στον θρόνο των Αθηνών του Χρυσοστόμου Παπαδοπούλου, υλοποιήθηκε πρόταση της Ιεράς Συνόδου της Ιεραρχίας της Εκκλησίας της Ελλάδος και ο Μητροπολίτης Αθηνών έλαβε τον τίτλο «Μακαριώτατος Αρχιεπίσκοπος Αθηνών και πάσης Ελλάδος», τίτλο που διατηρεί ώς σήμερα.") Chrysostomos I (Papadopoulos) becomes Metropolitan of Athens in March 1923, elevated to Archbishop of Athens on 31 December 1923, (1923–1938); (Note: "He was a historian who searched through all the facets of Christian life from its beginning up to the present and who, with his voluminous literary production, demonstrated the unity of Orthodoxy in all of its variety. As archbishop of Athens (1922-38), he endowed the Church with its basic institutions.") Exchange of Christian and Muslim population between Greece and Turkey, with around 1.2 million Orthodox Christians leaving Turkey (Greek refugees); (Note: "On 30 January 1923, after the Greek Turkish war that lasted almost three years, the two governments signed a convention in Lausanne that forced almost 2 million people to leave their homes and migrate across the Aegean. Around 1.2 million Orthodox Christians left Turkey or were not allowed to return if they had left during the war, and in exchange, around 350,000 Muslims migrated from Greece (Hirschon 2004: 14-15, Aktar and Demirozu 2006: 85-98, Svolopoulos 2006: 99-119).") the Greek-Orthodox, Turkish-speaking Karamanlides are expelled from Turkey as part of the Greek-Turkish population exchange of 1923; Treaty of Lausanne affirmed the international status of the Ecumenical Patriarchate, with Turkey guaranteeing respect and the Patriarchate's full protection, also granting control of the Holy Mountain to Greece; Patriarch ceases to be regarded as head of the Christian Orthodox Millet (millet-i Rûm) in Turkey; Patr. Meletios IV (Metaxakis) promulgates reformed calendar at the Pan-Orthodox Congress of Constantinople in May 1923, which had also proposed cutting the clergy's beard and hair, on replacing the rason with the dress of Anglican clergy, and finally on the possibility of an Orthodox Priest marrying a second time, while leaving the matter of the regulation of the number of fast days and the length of fasts to the local Churches; (Note: The new calendar was proposed for adoption by the Orthodox churches at a synod in Constantinople in May 1923. The synod, chaired by controversial Patriarch Meletius IV of Constantinople, and called Pan-Orthodox by its supporters. But only the Patriarch of Constantinople and the Serbian Patriarch were represented. There were no representatives of the other members of the original Orthodox Pentarchy (the Patriarchates of Jerusalem, Antioch, and Alexandria) or from the largest Orthodox Church, the Russian Orthodox Church.) Greek government adopts Gregorian calendar; translation of the relics of New Martyr Theocharis of Neapolis, Cappadocia (1740) to the Church of St. Catherine, Thessaloniki.

== See also ==
- Eastern Orthodoxy in Greece
- List of archbishops of Athens
- Greek Orthodox Church
- Eastern Orthodox Church organization

History

- History of the Eastern Orthodox Church
- History of Eastern Christianity
- History of the Eastern Orthodox Church under the Ottoman Empire
- History of Eastern Orthodox Churches in the 20th century
- Timeline of Eastern Orthodoxy in America

Church Fathers

- Apostolic Fathers
- Church Fathers
- Ante-Nicene Fathers (book)
- Desert Fathers
- Nicene and Post-Nicene Fathers
- List of Church Fathers

== Bibliography ==
Greek War of Independence

- David Brewer. The Greek War of Independence : the struggle for freedom from Ottoman oppression and the birth of the modern Greek nation. Woodstock, N.Y. : Overlook Press, 2001. 393pp.
- Douglas Dakin. The Greek struggle for independence, 1821–1833. London, Batsford 1973.
- Joseph Braddock. The Greek Phoenix: The Struggle for Liberty from the Fall of Constantinople to the Creation of a New Greek Nation. NY. Coward, McCann & Geoghegan. 1973. 1st ed. 233 pp.
- Nikiforos P. Diamandouros [et al.] (Eds.). Hellenism and the First Greek war of Liberation (1821–1830): Continuity and Change. The Modern Greek Studies Association of the United States and Canada. Thessaloniki: Institute for Balkan Studies, 1976.

Modern Greece

- Christos Yannaras. Orthodoxy and the West: Hellenic Self-Identity in the Modern Age. Transl. Peter Chamberas and Norman Russell. Brookline: Holy Cross Orthodox Press, 2006. ISBN 1-885652-81-X
- Giannēs Koliopoulos and Thanos Veremēs. Greece: The Modern Sequel, from 1831 to the Present. NYU Press, 2002. 407 pp. ISBN 9780814747674
- C.M. Woodhouse. Modern Greece. 4th ed. Boston : Faber and Faber, 1986.
- Charles A. Frazee. The Orthodox Church and independent Greece, 1821–1852. Cambridge University Press 1969.
- Demetrios J. Constantelos. Understanding the Greek Orthodox Church: Its Faith, History and Life. 4th Edition. Brookline, Mass.: Hellenic College Press, 2005. ISBN 9780917653506
- Dimitri E. Conomos, Graham Speake. Mount Athos, the Sacred Bridge: The Spirituality of the Holy Mountain. Oxford: Peter Lang, 2005.
- Herman A. Middleton. Precious Vessels of the Holy Spirit: The Lives & Counsels of Contemporary Elders of Greece. 2nd Ed. Protecting Veil Press, 2004.
- John L. Tomkinson. Between Heaven and Earth: The Greek Church. Anagnosis Books, Athens, 2004.
- Rev. Dr. Nicon D. Patrinacos (M.A., D.Phil. (Oxon)). A Dictionary of Greek Orthodoxy – Λεξικον Ελληνικης Ορθοδοξιας. Light & Life Publishing, Minnesota, 1984.
- Rev. A. H. Hore. Eighteen centuries of the Orthodox Greek Church. London: James Parker & Co. 1899. 706pp. (Re-printed: Gorgias Press LLC, 2003.)
