= Timeline of Eastern Orthodoxy in Greece (1924–1974) =

This is a timeline of the presence of Orthodoxy in Greece from 1924 to 1974. The history of Greece traditionally encompasses the study of the Greek people, the areas they ruled historically, as well as the territory now composing the modern state of Greece.

== Second Hellenic Republic (1924–1935) ==
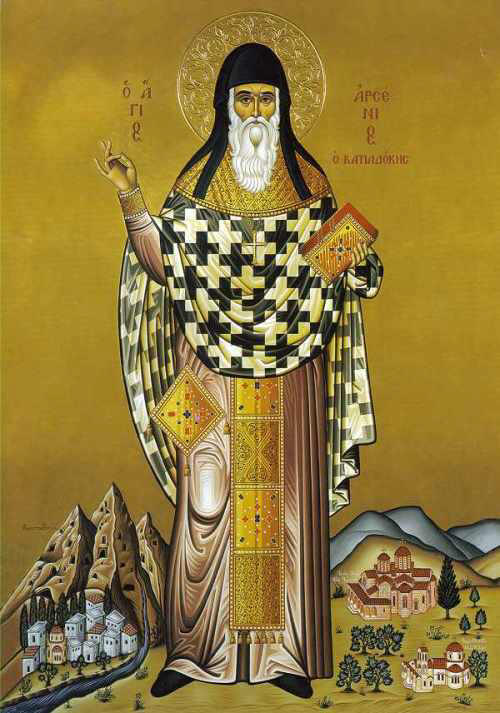
Venerable Saint Arsenios the Cappadocian (1840–1924).

- 1924 Constitution of the Holy Mountain agreed, ratified by the Greek State by the Legislative Decree of 10/16 September 1926; Greek Orthodox Archdiocese of Australia formally founded; death of Arsenios of Cappadocia.
- 1925 School of Theology established at the Aristotle University of Thessaloniki, due to the initiative taken by the government of Alexandros Papanastasiou.
- 1925–1945 Emigration of less than 30,000 Greeks to the United States, many of whom were "picture brides" for single Greek men.
- 1926 Proposal for Mount Athos to be turned into a condominium by Dictator Theodoros Pangalos, as part of the treaty signed on 17 August between Greece and the Kingdom of Serbs, Croats and Slovenes; (Note: On 17 August 1926, government representatives from Greece and the Kingdom of Serbs, Croats and Slovenes (Yugoslavia) signed an agreement settling the question of a Yugoslav free port at Thessaloniki.) the existing constitution governing the affairs of Mount Athos is passed.
- 1927–1954 Archim. Seraphim Papakostas (1872–1954) succeeds Archim. Eusebius Matthopoulos as head of the Zoe Brotherhood movement in Greece. (Note: "Like Matthopoulos he wrote like a Protestant pietist. In his book The Question of Conception, Papakostas faithfully follows Anglican and Roman Catholic opinion about contraception, presented as a quintessentially Orthodox view.")
- 1928 The Ecumenical Patriarchate issued a tome by which it ceded to the Church of Greece, on a temporary basis, 35 of its metropolitan dioceses in northern Greece to be administered by it. (Note: "Codified in the 1928 Patriarchal and Synodical Act, the "New Lands" were entrusted to the temporary stewardship of the Church of Greece, provided that the Church respected the terms of the Act. The Act subsequently has been incorporated into several pieces of Greek legislation (Laws 3615/1928, 5438/1932, 599/1977, and Article 3, paragraph 1 of the current Greek Constitution), thereby recognizing the ecclesiastical agreement between the two sides.")
- 1930 Mustafa Kemal Atatürk officially renamed Constantinople to Istanbul, which comes from the Greek expression "eis-tin-polin" ("to the City"), based on the common Greek usage of referring to Constantinople simply as The City; a Pan-Orthodox Consultation on Mount Athos concluded that the only possible relations on the part of the Orthodox toward the Roman Catholics was "Relations of defense on the part of the Orthodox toward Roman Catholic Proselytism;" Traditionalist Greeks (Old Calendarist communities) began publishing the monthly journal Orthodoxos Keryx (Orthodox Herald) from 1930.

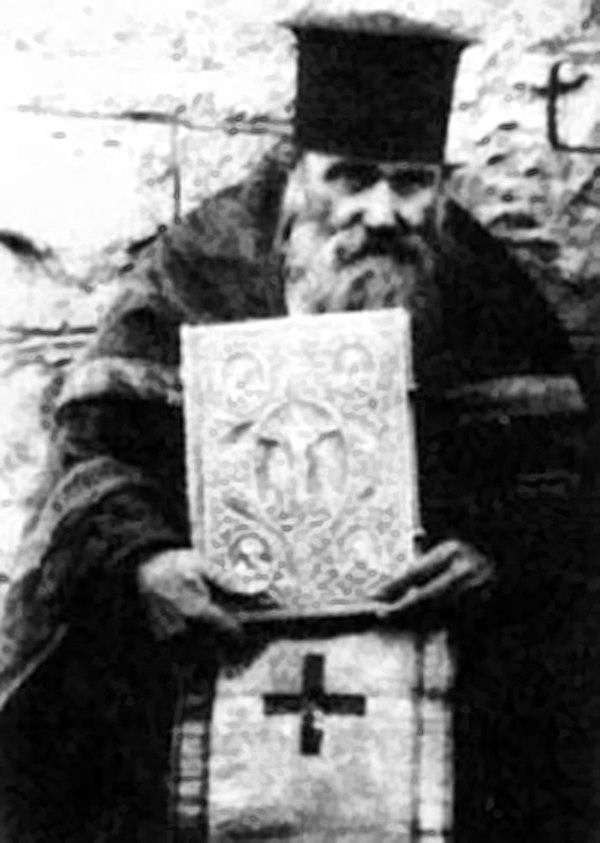
Saint Nicholas Planas of Athens (1851–1932).

- 1930–1931 Rulings of the Court of Appeal (1930) and the Supreme Court (1931) imposed a ban on Uniates in Greece from wearing the outer garments of Orthodox clergy, in order to avoid the confusion with Orthodox clergy they were seeking, however the Uniates never consistently respected this decision.

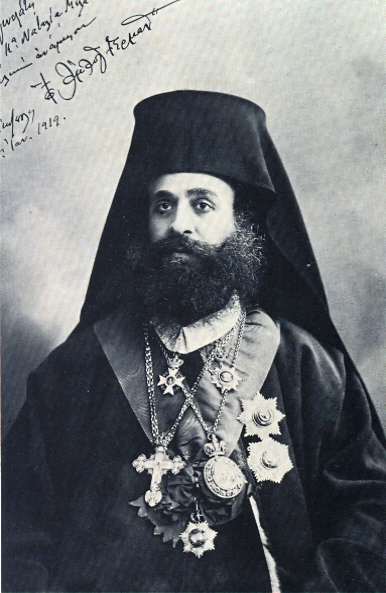
Eminent Metropolitan Germanos Karavangelis (1866–1935).

- 1931 Benaki Museum opens in Athens, housing Byzantine, Post-Byzantine, and Neo-Hellenic ecclesiastical and national art collections. (Note: "Antonis Benakis, son of a rich Greek family in Alexandria, donated his Athens family home and a collection of 37,000 Islamic and Byzantine objects and books to the state in 1931.")
- 1932 Death of Saint Nicholas Planas.
- 1933 Church of Greece bans Freemasonry, declaring that when one becomes a Mason (a member of Freemasonry) it is an act of apostasy from the Church and therefore, until that person repents, they can not attend the Holy Eucharist; (Note: "Orthodox Christians must disavow the Masonic movement and resign from it if they have joined it in ignorance of its goals. Pike, in his Morals and Dogma of the Ancient and Accepted Scottish Rite of Freemasonry tells us that "Every Masonic Lodge is a temple of religion; and its teachings are instruction in religion." (p. 213) "Masonry, around whose altars the Christian, the Hebrew, the Moslem, the Brahim, the followers of Confucius and Zoroaster, can assemble as brethren and unite in prayer to the one God who is above all the Baalism." (p. 226) "Masonry, like all religions, all the Mysteries, conceals its secrets from all except the Adepts and Sages or Elect and uses false explanations and interpretations of its symbols to mislead those who deserve only to be misled." (p. 105 ).) (Note: (in Greek) "Η Σύνοδος τής Ιεραρχίας ασχολήθηκε με το θέμα αυτό κατά την συνεδρία τής 7ης Οκτωβρίου 1933 και εξέδωσε ειδική «Πράξη» (Εκκλησία 48/1933, σ. 37–39). Το κείμενο αυτό κάνει λόγο περί «διεθνούς μυητικού οργανισμού» και «μυσταγωγικού συστήματος, όπερ υπομιμνήσκει τάς παλαιάς εθνικάς μυστηριακάς θρησκείας ή λατρείας, από των οποίων κατάγεται και των οποίων συνέχειαν και αναβίωσιν αποτελεί». Το κείμενο αναφέρεται σε μαρτυρίες μασονικών κειμένων και κατοχυρώνει τη θέση της «εκ των εν ταίς μυήσεσιν δρωμένων και τελουμένων».) opening of the new Patriarchal Palace in Cairo by Patriarch Meletios, built at the expense of Theodore Kotsikas.
- 1934 Mustafa Kemal Atatürk transformed Hagia Sophia into a museum. (Note: "In 1934, however, after establishing Turkey as a secular state in which religion was to be held in a sphere separate from government, law, and politics, the first president of Turkey, Mustafa Kemal Ataturk (1923–1938), ordered that Hagia Sophia be closed as a mosque and her icons restored. However, rather than return the basilica to the EP, he insisted that the historic church become a state-sponsored museum.")
- 1935 Death of eminent prelate Metropolitan Germanos (Karavangelis) in Vienna, who had played a central role and was an active participant both in the Greek Struggle for Macedonia and in Pontus, and was a primary candidate for election to the Ecumenical Throne of Constantinople in 1921, and to be Archbishop of Athens in 1923, only to censured in the end by both church and state; Old Calendar schism, when three bishops declared their separation from the official Church of Greece stating that the calendar change was a schismatic act; (Note: A major event occurred in May 1935: Eleven Bishops of the official Church decided to return to the Old Calendar and to take charge of the Traditionalist communities. Nonetheless, such was the pressure exerted on them that eight withdrew at the last moment. The three bishops who persevered were: Metropolitan Germanos (Mavrommatis) of Demetrias (1907–1935); Metropolitan Chrysostom (Kavourides) of Florina (1926–1932), a retired bishop, who became head of the Old Calendar Church; and; Metropolitan Chrysostomos (Demetriou) of Zakynthos.; In an official encyclical as a synod of living bishops, they declared that the new calendar Churches were in a state of schism, and then they consecrated four new bishops, including: Matthew (Karpathakis) of Bresthena; Germanus of the Cyclades; Christopher of Megara; and Polycarp of Diavlia. In 1937 they split amongst themselves; and today they have become more than 12 groups, on account of successive splintering, defrocking, rivalry, walling-off, and anathematizing. Greek Old Calendarist groups maintain that they have not separated over a mere calendar, rather that the calendar is a symptom of what has been called "the pan-heresy of ecumenism.") German Biblical scholar Alfred Rahlfs published his two-volume Septuaginta, a semi-critical edition of the Greek Septuagint, being the only complete critical text of the Septuagint in existence to that date. (Note: It was based on the principles of reconstructing the text conceptualized by him and Lagarde. It was, however, only a preliminary critical edition, inasmuch as Rahlfs realized that it would be impossible in his lifetime to take into account the textual evidence of the many hundreds of existing manuscripts and relevant subsequent translations of the Septuagint. So he undertook to base the text he reconstructed primarily on the three great uncial manuscripts of the fourth and fifth centuries A.D., Vaticanus, Sinaiticus, and Alexandrinus.)

== Kingdom of Greece restored (1935–1967) ==
- 1936 Apostolic Ministry of the Church of Greece founded ( 'Apostoliki Diakonia' ); General Ioannis Metaxas, Prime Minister of Greece during the 4th of August Regime (1936–41), propagated a Third Hellenic Civilization (Ancient Greece and Byzantium being the first two); by 1936, Zoe Brotherhood had opened 300 catechetical schools with 35,000 pupils, and received the first prize at the International Protestant Conference on Sunday Schools in Oslo.

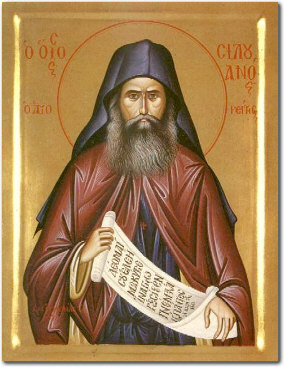
Venerable Saint Silouan of Mt Athos (†1938).

- 1937 The Ecumenical Patriarchate chose a number of highly educated religious personalities for key positions in the recently declared Autocephalous Orthodox Church of Albania, after an agreement with the Albanian authorities, including Panteleimon (Kotokos) as Metr. of Gjirokastër, and Eulogios (Kourilas), as metropolitan of Korytsa; Mass NKVD operation against Greeks in the USSR begins, based on Joseph Stalin's Directive 50125 Dec. 1937, resulting in the loss of 38,000 Soviet citizens of Hellenic descent at the Gulags of Siberia.
- 1938 Death of Silouan of Mt Athos; Chrysanthos (Philippidis) becomes the Archbishop of Athens and all Greece (1938–1941); American Carpatho-Russian Orthodox Diocese is founded, when a group of 37 Ruthenian Eastern Catholic parishes, under the leadership of Fr. Orestes Chornock were received into the jurisdiction of the Ecumenical Patriarchate.

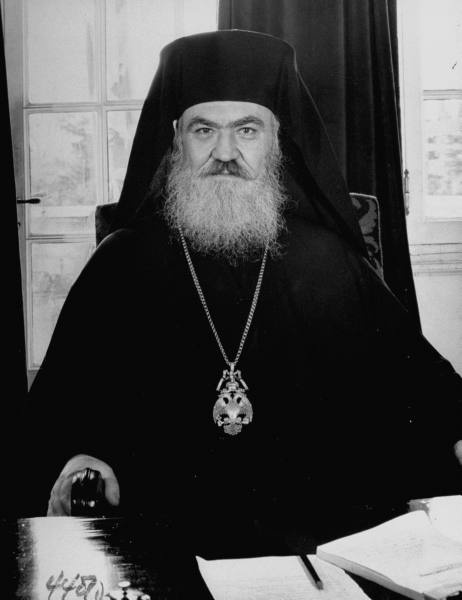
Abp. Damaskinos (Papandreou) of Athens (1941–1949).

- 1939–49 World War II and subsequent Greek Civil War (1944–49), famine and widespread bloodshed. (Note: The Greek Civil War (December 1944 – January 1945 and 1946–49) was a two-stage conflict during which Greek communists unsuccessfully tried to gain control of Greece.)
- 1939 The emigration of the Antiochian Greeks reaches its peak. (Note: Historically, they were considered as a part of Rûm millet by the Ottoman authorities. As the Sanjak of Alexandretta was then a part of Syria, Greeks were not subject to population exchange of 1923. After Hatay State was annexed by Turkey in 1939, many of them emigrated to Syria and Lebanon.)
- 1941 In occupied Athens, Abp. Chrysanthos refused to swear in the first Quisling government of Georgios Tsolakoglou appointed by the Germans.
- 1943 Massacre of Kalavryta by German occupation forces, including the monks and monastery of Agia Lavra; (Note: On 13 December 1943, some 1200 males, including boys as young as 13, were massacred by Germans and the town gutted.) the Nazi attempt to exterminate the Jews of Athens fails, thanks to the combined efforts of Abp. Damaskinos (Papandreou) of Athens, Greek resistance groups and the Greek people.
- 1944 Abp. Damaskinos (Papandreou) of Athens serves as regent in an attempt to stabilise Greece (31 Dec 1944 – 28 Sep 1946).
- 1946 The Civil Code of Greece (Gr: Αστικός Κώδικας) came into effect on 23 February 1946. (Note: The history of the Greek Civil Code is rather brief. After the establishment of the Modern Greek state (1832), the first efforts to institute a common civil code started. Concurrently, regional civil codes were applied, such as the Ionian Code of 1841, the Samiakos Code of 1899 and the Cretan code of 1903. Finally, the government of Eleutherios Venizelos was effective in its efforts to institute a Civil Code, establishing a committee for that purpose. The committee consisted of legal scholars and drafted a fully developed civil code. This code was put in force with Law 2250/1940, but due to the German occupation that followed, its application began on 23 February 1946.)
- 1947 The Dodecanese Islands are liberated but remain under the Patriarchate of Constantinople; (Note: "The Germans troops who surrendered to the Greeks on the island of Symi on 8 May 1945, were the last Germans to lay down their arms. As one commentator noted, in their surrender, even the Nazis recognised the Dodecanese as Greek. Under the Paris Peace Treaty of 1947, the islands were formally transferred to Greek sovereignty.") death of Venerable Saint Savvas the New of Kalymnos.
- 1949 Princess Andrew of Greece and Denmark founded an Orthodox nursing order of nuns known as the Christian Sisterhood of Martha and Mary, and built a convent and orphanage in a poor suburb of Athens. (Note: "In 1949, Alice founded the Christian Sisterhood of Martha and Mary in 1949 and spent years attempting to secure funding for it, according to her New York Times obituary " (6 December 1969).)
- 1950 Uncovering of the relics of St. Ephraim of Nea Makri (†1426); foundation of the Albanian Orthodox Diocese of America under the Ecumenical Patriarchate, with the episcopal ordination on 10 September in Constantinople of Mark Lipa as titular Bishop of Levka (1950–1982). (Note: "Bishop Mark Lipa arrived in the United States in December 1950 and succeeded in winning the loyalty of three of the twelve AOCA parishes in the country...Since the union of the Albanian Orthodox Church in America (AOCA) and its counterpart in the homeland was no longer an option following the suppression in 1967 of all religious organizations in Albania, in 1971 the AOCA, to ensure its canonical status, joined the multinational Orthodox Church of America as its Albanian Orthodox Archdiocese.")
- 1951 In June, the Church of Greece organized inter-orthodox events in commemoration of the 1900th anniversary of the Apostle Paul's mission to Athens; the 1500th anniversary celebration of the Greek Orthodox Patriarchate of Jerusalem.
- 1952 The Holy Synod of the Church of Greece decided to commemorate the feast day of The Protection of the Mother of God on 28 October, rather than on the traditional date of 1 October, thus coinciding with Ohi Day in Greece; (Note: Because of the many miracles of the Holy Virgin which were reported by Greek soldiers during the Greco-Italian War of 1940–1941, the Holy Synod of the Church of Greece decided in 1952 to commemorate the feast day of The Protection of the Mother of God on 28 October, rather than on the traditional date of 1 October. Thus, the feast of the Protection of the Mother of God was made to coincide on 28 October with Ohi Day in Greece – ((in Greek) «'Οχι»), the Anniversary of the "No" – which is celebrated throughout Greece, Cyprus and in Greek communities around the world in commemoration of the rejection by Greek Prime Minister Ioannis Metaxas of the ultimatum made by Italian dictator Benito Mussolini on 28 October 1940. (See also: Greco-Italian War and the Battle of Greece).) new monastery of Panagia Soumela built in the village of Kastania, in Macedonia, Greece, housing the wonder-working icon of Panagia Soumela, becoming a center of religious pilgrimage; Ecumenical Patr. Athenagoras I (Spyrou) officially visited, for the first time in the last one thousand years, the Papal representative in Constantinople, who returned the visit.
- 1953 The Athonite School was officially re-established in Mount Athos, now named the Athonite Ecclesiastical Academy, occupying a wing of the Skete of St. Andrew in Karyes, following the Greek secondary school curriculum combined with ecclesiastical education.
- 1955 Istanbul Pogrom: In September an organised mob was turned against the ethnic Greek community and the Ecumenical Patriarchate in an orchestrated pogrom, destroying 73 churches, 1,004 residences, 5,000 small- and medium-sized businesses, two cemeteries, 23 schools and 5 athletic centres; the number of ethnic Greeks who were forced to leave Turkey by 1960 as a result of these events is estimated at 9,000; Glorification of Nicodemos of the Holy Mountain (†1809) by the Patriarchate of Constantinople; the small Greek community in Venice devoted its resources and works of post-Byzantine art to founding the Hellenic Institute of Byzantine and Post-Byzantine Studies (Istituto Ellenico) on the site of the former Flanginian School, established by law in 1951 and starting its activity in 1955. (Note: The institute (Istituto Ellenico) publishes a yearly periodical entitled Θησαυρίσματα . The first issue appeared in 1962.)
- 1956 Death of prominent theologian Gregorios Papamichael, professor at the University of Athens, who was responsible for resurrecting two almost forgotten great personalities of Orthodoxy: Gregorios Palamas and Maximos (Trivolis) the Greek, and who furthermore examined diligently various cultural aspects of church life; (Note: Both Abp. Chrysostomos I (Papadopoulos) (r. 1923–1938) and Gregorios Papamichael (1875–1956) are rightly credited for establishing the two basic academic journals of Neohellenic theology: Theologia and Ekklesia.) Dr. Constantine Cavarnos founds the Institute for Byzantine and Modern Greek Studies in Belmont, Massachusetts; prominent theologian Nikos Nissiotis (1926–86) defended his doctoral dissertation Existentialism and the Christian Faith, being the first time that a Greek confronted the problems raised by Kierkegaard, Jaspers, Heidegger and Sartre in the light of living Orthodox theological thought. (Note: Nissiotis embodies a new type of thinking free from the provincialism and old-fashioned attitudes characteristic of Greek theology. He was in touch with all the new developments of his time, being well-informed about current trends in science, philosophy, art, psychology and politics. For a theologian, the breadth of his interests was unprecedented. He not only observed the rapid changes taking place in the world around him but also participated in them.)

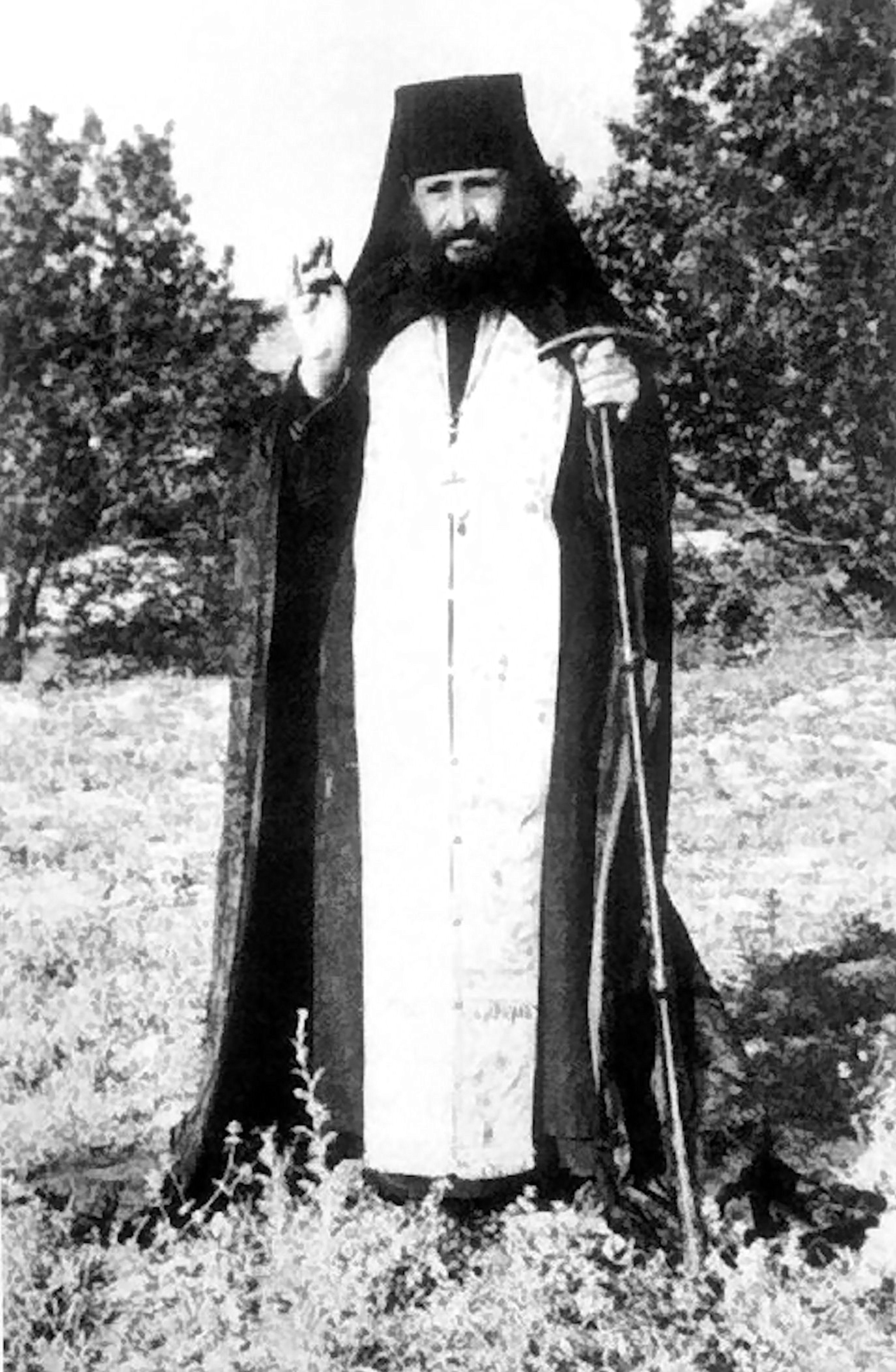
Saint George (Karslidis) of Drama (†1959)

- 1957 Death of Blessed Elder Jeronymo (Ieronimos) abbot of Simonopetra. Greek-American priest John Romanides publishes his doctoral dissertation The Ancestral Sin with the approval of the Theological Faculty of the University of Athens, representing a classic, landmark work in the theological revolution of the 1960s that set an unimpeachable standard of Orthodoxy.
- 1958 Pope John XXIII and Ecumenical Patr. Athenagoras I (Spyrou) exchanged formal letters calling for peace among the Christian churches.

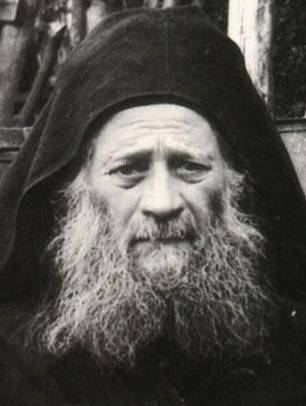
Blessed Elder Joseph (Spilaiotis) the Hesychast (†1959)

- 1959 Death of Blessed Elder Joseph (Spilaiotis) the Hesychast; death of Venerable Elder and New Confessor George (Karslidis) of Drama; the Zoe Brotherhood edition of the New Testament had sold over 650,000 copies by 1959; Hieromonk Augoustinos Kantiotes founds the Society of Theologians "The Cross" ("O Stavros") , which assumed the form of a brotherhood in 1966; Abp. Anastasios (Yannoulatos) of Albania establishes inter-Orthodox mission agency Porefthentes (Go Ye) to revive the church's mission activities.
- 1960 Death of Venerable Saint Anthimos of Chios; death of Archimandrite Iakovos Valodimos of Monodendri, Ioannina (1870–1960), ascetic and confessor.
- 1961 Glorification of Nektarios of Pentapolis (†1920); first ever visit of a Greek Orthodox Patriarch to Canada, as Patr. Benedict I of Jerusalem begins a North-American tour to raise funds for the restoration of the shrines in the Holy Land; Greek language ultraconservative ecclesiastical newspaper Orthodoxos Typos (Orthodox Press) is founded by Archimandrite Charalambos Vasilopoulos (1910–1982); (Note: "Archimandrite Charalambos Vasilopoulos (1910–1982) was one of the leading figures of the Greek Orthodox anti-ecumenical movement, and is still held in high esteem in conservative ecclesiastical circles. In 1959, he founded a religious society (the POE, Panhellenic Orthodox Union) with an anti-heretical agenda, and in 1961 he established the newspaper Orthodoxos Typos (Orthodox Press), which continues to be the chief voice of Orthodox fundamentalism. He was abbot of Moni Petraki monastery from 1962 to 1968. He published a huge number of biographies of saints, initially in collaboration with Fotis Kontoglou, which have collectively sold in the hundreds of thousands and still retain their popularity. Archimandrite Vasilopoulos' favourite word was the verb 'to uncover'. Everywhere he went he saw hidden enemies of Orthodoxy and of the nation (ecumenists, freemasons, Jehovah's Witnesses, and, above all, Jews), and considered it his duty to expose them. Hence the titles of his books, all published by Orthodox Press Publications, at very low prices and in tens of thousands of copies: Uncovering Freemasonry (1967); Jewish Freemasonry Revealed (1975), an extended version of the former; Ecumenism Unmasked (1971); Uncovering Jehovah's Witnesses (undated); The Rotary Club Unmasked (undated); Theosophy Uncovered (1973); 'Inspired Women' Unmasked (1977).") death of Metr. Eulogios (Kourilas) of Korytsa (Korçë), one of the leaders of the Northern Epirus movement.
- 1962 Foundation of Monastery of the Annunciation of the Virgin Mary, in Oinousses (Metropolis of Chios, Psara and Oinouses).
- 1962–68 The 12-Volume "Religious and Ethical Encyclopedia" (Θρησκευτική και Ηθική Εγκυκλοπαίδεια, ΘΗΕ) is compiled as a joint effort between academics, university scholars and other contributors, published by the Athanasios Martinos publishing house, Athens.
- 1963 Soter Brotherhood is created, as the more traditionalist members broke away from the Zoe Brotherhood to form a smaller new brotherhood under the leadership of Prof. Panagiotes N. Trembelas, having a profound influence on the Church of Greece; Second Pan-Orthodox Conference held in Rhodes; 1000th anniversary celebration of founding of Mount Athos; Archimandrite Chrysostomos Papasarantopoulos founds the Orthodox missionary society "The Friends of Uganda", known today as the "Orthodox Missionary Fraternity" (Αδελφότητα Ορθοδόξου Εξωτερικής Ιεραποστολής).
- 1964 The skull of St. Andrew the Apostle, the martyred Patron Saint of Greece, was returned to the Greek Orthodox Church as a gesture of Church unity by Pope Paul VI; (Note: "The skull of St. Andrew, the martyred Patron Saint of Greece, arrived by air in Greece last Saturday from Rome. It was returned to the Greek Orthodox Church as a gesture of Church unity by Pope Paul. A Greek Orthodox delegation flew to Rome the day before to accompany the relic to Patras. Cardinal Bea led a party of 15 cardinals accompanying the skull, which is encased in gold, and presented it to Bishop Constantine of Patras, where St. Andrew the Apostle was martyred. His skull was kept there until 1462, when it was removed to Rome to preserve it from the advancing Turks.") death of Nicephorus the Leper; Panagia Malevi icon of the Mother of God begins gushing myrrh, at the Malevi Monastery, at Agios Petros, Arcadia; Third Pan-Orthodox Conference held in Rhodes; in March, Turkey denounced the 1930 bilateral agreement on disputes arising from the exchange of populations and expelled more than 17,000 ethnic Greeks, who were deprived of all access to their real estate, goods and chattels, subsequently followed by the de facto exodus of 40,000 ethnic Greeks of Turkish citizenship. (Note: "Over a thousand Greeks were promptly expelled, most on a few hours' notice. They were permitted to take with them only $22 and one suitcase of clothes. Another 5,000 were expelled shortly thereafter. Another 10,000 to 11,000 Greeks were expelled after September 1964, when Turkey discontinued renewing residence permits of Greek citizens. On 11 October 1964, the Turkish newspaper, Cumhuriyet, reported that 30,000 Turkish nationals of Greek descent had left permanently, in addition to the Greeks who had been expelled.")
- 1965 Death of icon painter Photios Kontoglou, who was a strong influence in the reintroduction of traditional Byzantine and postbyzantine style in church icon painting; first Metropolitan for Piraeus is elected, Chrysostomos (Tabladorakis) of Argolidos; Monastery of Panagia Pantanassa (Kranidiou) founded; Pope Paul VI of Rome and Patr. Athenagoras I (Spyrou) of Constantinople mutually nullify the excommunications of 1054; translation of the Holy Relics of Venerable Sabbas the Sanctified from the church of Sant'Antonin, Venice, back to the Holy Lavra of Saint Sabbas the Sanctified, preceded by consultations between Pope Paul VI and Patriarch Benedict I of Jerusalem; (Note: Saint Sabbas' relics had been stolen by the Crusaders of the First Crusade (1096–1099), along with many other relics, and were brought to Venice and placed in the Church of Sant'Antonin. The delegation from the Patriarchate of Jerusalem in 1965 included Archbishop Vasilios of Jordan (later the Matropolitan of Caesarea); Archimandrite Theodosios – Igumen of Bethany; Archimandrite Seraphim Savvaitis – Igumen of the Holy Lavra of Saint Sabbas the Sanctified; and Hierodeacon Kyriakos (later the Metropolitan of Nazareth). Elder Seraphim Savvaitis (†2003) had written in his memoirs that: "the Pope did not return the holy relics to us because he loved us, but because Saint Sabbas the Sanctified would often appear to him and troubled him to return his relics back to his monastery (i.e. Holy Lavra of Saint Sabbas the Sanctified). When the Pope died without having taken into account the Saint, Saint Sabbas appeared again to his successor. Moreover, in the church where his holy relics were kept within a glass reliquary, the Saint would hit the glass, making trouble and upsetting the guards and the Latin monks.") Professor John Karmiris wrote about the Vatican's plan to promote the union of the Orthodox and Papist, stating: "Pope Paul VI and his circle of Papist theologians worked out a well-researched and broad program of Rome-centered Ecumenism, in agreement with Latin Ecclesiology." (Note: "Fr. John Romanides, of blessed memory, revealed that a Papist "bishop" had confided to him that, according to the Vatican's plan, the union would not happen from the top, that is to say, from the bishops, the theologians and the dialogues, but rather from the so-called grassroots ecumenism, that is to say, through the mutual association between the two sides and the gradual implementation of sacramental intercommunion (intercommunio), which is already being put into effect by Rome and the Orthodox Ecumenists.") the Patriarchal Institute for Patristic Studies is established in Thessaloniki, located at the Holy Patriarchal and Stavropegial Monastery of Vlatadon (Moni Vlatadon). (Note: "This scientific institute was founded by a Patriarchal and Synodic Sigillion in 1965, and started functioning in 1968. It is housed in a special wing of the Holy Patriarchal and Stavropegic Monastery of the Vlatades in Acropolis, Thessalonica. Its aim according to the Patriarchal Sigillion is to promote «the study and research of Patrology, Christian literature in general, Patristic Theology, and their neighbouring Theology disciplines».")
- 1966 Professor Panagiotes K. Chrestou becomes the first director of the Patriarchal Institute for Patristic Studies (1966–1989), justly regarded as the leading Greek Patrologist of the 20th century; (Note: "Panayiotis Christou clearly saw how the teaching of Gregory Palamas could renew Orthodox theological studies internationally. Palamas' thought presupposes a vital Orthodox self-awareness, with a sense of the criteria that mark it off from the Western understanding of the Church. The Russian diaspora's "school" of theology, like the corresponding Serbian "school" of Fr. Justin Popović and the Romanian "school" of Fr. Dumitru Stăniloae, took on a neo-Palamite character. Christou's publishing initiative was a pivotal point in theological education, responding to a conscious need for the renewal of the Orthodox presence in our time." See: (in Greek) Παναγιώτης Χρήστου. Βικιπαίδεια. (Greek Wikipedia.)) death of Ieronymos (Apostolides) of Aegina; Center for Byzantine Research established at the Aristotle University of Thessaloniki; translation of the sacred relics of the Holy Apostle Titus of Crete, from Venice (which had taken them in 1669), back to the Greek Orthodox Archdiocese of Crete; Greek–American academic and professor C. A. Patrides publishes Milton and the Christian Tradition, a classic study of John Milton's Christian theology. (Note: "In a closely argued, thoroughly documented, and (considering the range of his subject) remarkable consise tome, Professor Patrides outlines Milton's ideas and presentation of the main points of the Christian faith, his conception of the Godhead, the Creation and the nature of Nature, the Fall and Redemption of Man, Love and Grace, history and the eschata of history.")
- 1966–1980 About 160,000 Greeks emigrated to the USA.
- 1967 Glorification of Arsenios of Paros (†1877) by the Patriarchate of Constantinople; professor C. A. Patrides surveyed the history of apocatastasis in his Salvation of Satan. (Note: "This theory conflicts with traditional Christian teaching on several counts. It contradicts the vision of the historical process as a path to the final transfiguration and change into a better state, not as a return to the starting point. Secondly, it practically excludes the notion that one can follow Christ into eternal life only of one's free choice...Thirdly, in Origen's system the apokatastasis is closely linked with the theory of the pre-existence of souls: the life of the soul in the body is viewed as a kind of punishment or trial, necessary for its restoration to its primordial dignity. This theory has always been firmly rejected by the Church. Fourthly, Origen's version of the apokatastasis raises the question: what is the moral sense of the entire drama of human history, if good and evil are ultimately irrelevant before divine mercy and justice? The Council of Constantinople in 543 and the fifth ecumenical council in 553 condemned the teaching of Origen and his followers on the doctrine of apokatastasis. But having condemned Origen, the fifth ecumenical council said not a word about the teaching of Gregory of Nyssa, who also wrote of the total extermination of vice and the final salvation of all people.")

== Military dictatorship (1967–1974) ==
- 1967 The military junta which seized power in Greece on 21 April, adopted a new law which dismissed the twelve bishops of the Synod, the executive body of the sixty-seven member Assembly of Bishops, reduced the membership of the Synod to nine, and provided that the government, rather than the Assembly of Bishops, would elect the members of the Synod; on 13 May, eight members of the handpicked Aristindin Synod choose three candidates for the election of the Archbishop of Athens, of whom two, the Metropolitans of Patras and of Trikki, waived their candidacy in favour of the third, Archimandrite Ieronymos Kotsonis, who became the Archbishop of Athens and all Greece (1967–1973); (Note: "The military junta which seized power in Greece on 21 April, adopted and put into effect a new law which resulted in major changes within the Greek Orthodox Church. The law dismissed the twelve bishops of the Synod, the executive body of the sixty-seven member Assembly of Bishops, reduced the membership of the Synod to nine; and provided that the government, rather than the Assembly of Bishops, would elect the members of the Synod. The newly constituted Synod was given the power to name new bishops, which power was formerly possessed by the Assembly. The junta also forced retirement of Archbishop Chrysostomos by extending a compulsory retirement statute to cover this position although he had previously been exempt from the measure. He was replaced by Archimandrite Ieronymos Kotsonis who was the personal chaplain to King Constantine and who is regarded as one of the most progressive figures of the church. The new archbishop soon made it clear that the traditional attitude of the Greek hierarchy toward the Ecumenical Patriarch of Constantinople would not be followed by him as he emphasized the ties of respect between his church and the Patriarchate of Constantinople. In his installation address he pledged sweeping reformation within the church, mentioning particularly his intention to purge the church of unworthy ministers and to seek to attract better educated clergy.") (Note: "The junta in Greece forced the resignation of the old and ailing archbishop of Athens, Chrysostomos II Hatzistaurou, promoting in his place a young archimandrite, Hieronymos Kotsonas; replaced the canonical synod of the Church with the uncanonical "Aristindin" synod; and replaced the bishops it disliked with others it preferred.") on 1, 20 June and 22 the Aristindin Synod met to propose candidates for thirteen vacant sees, with most of the new bishops being sympathetically disposed towards the Zoe and Sotir Brotherhoods; Hieromonk Augoustinos Kantiotes elected Metropolitan of Florina, Prespai and Eordaia (1967–2000).
- 1968 Orthodox Academy of Crete (OAC) founded by the Archdiocese of Crete, near the Moni Gonia Monastery. (Note: (in Greek) Τα εγκαίνια της ΟΑΚ έγιναν στις 13 Οκτωβρίου 1968 με συμμετοχή εκπροσώπων όλων των Ορθοδόξων Εκκλησιών, άλλων χριστιανικών παραδόσεων και Οργανισμών, των Πανεπιστημίων της χώρας και πλήθους λαού.) the Pope removed from the Calendar of Saints the Great-Martyr St. George the Trophy-bearer and erased thirty other Saints with him, including Saint Nicholas, Saint Christopher, Saint Barbara, and Saint Catherine, being among the chief Saints of Orthodoxy.
- 1970 Death of Elder Amphilochios (Makris) of Patmos. (Note: He was glorified by the Holy Synod of the Ecumenical Patriarchate of Constantinople on 29 August 2018: (in Greek) α) Εἰσηγήσει τῆς Κανονικῆς Ἐπιτροπῆς συμπεριελήφθη εἰς τό Ἁγιολόγιον τῆς Ὀρθοδόξου Ἐκκλησίας ὁ ἐν Πάτμῳ ἀσκήσας καί ἀναπτύξας μέγα πνευματικόν καί κοινωφελές ἔργον ἐν Δωδεκανήσῳ, Κρήτῃ καί ἀλλαχοῦ Ἀρχιμανδρίτης Ἀμφιλόχιος Μακρῆς, διατελέσας Ἡγούμενος τῆς ἱστορικῆς Ἱερᾶς Μονῆς Ἁγίου Ἰωάννου τοῦ Θεολόγου καί Πατριαρχικός Ἔξαρχος Πάτμου, ὅστις καί ἵδρυσε τήν ἐν τῇ Νήσῳ γυναικείαν Ἱεράν Μονήν Εὐαγγελισμοῦ Μητρός Ἠγαπημένου.)

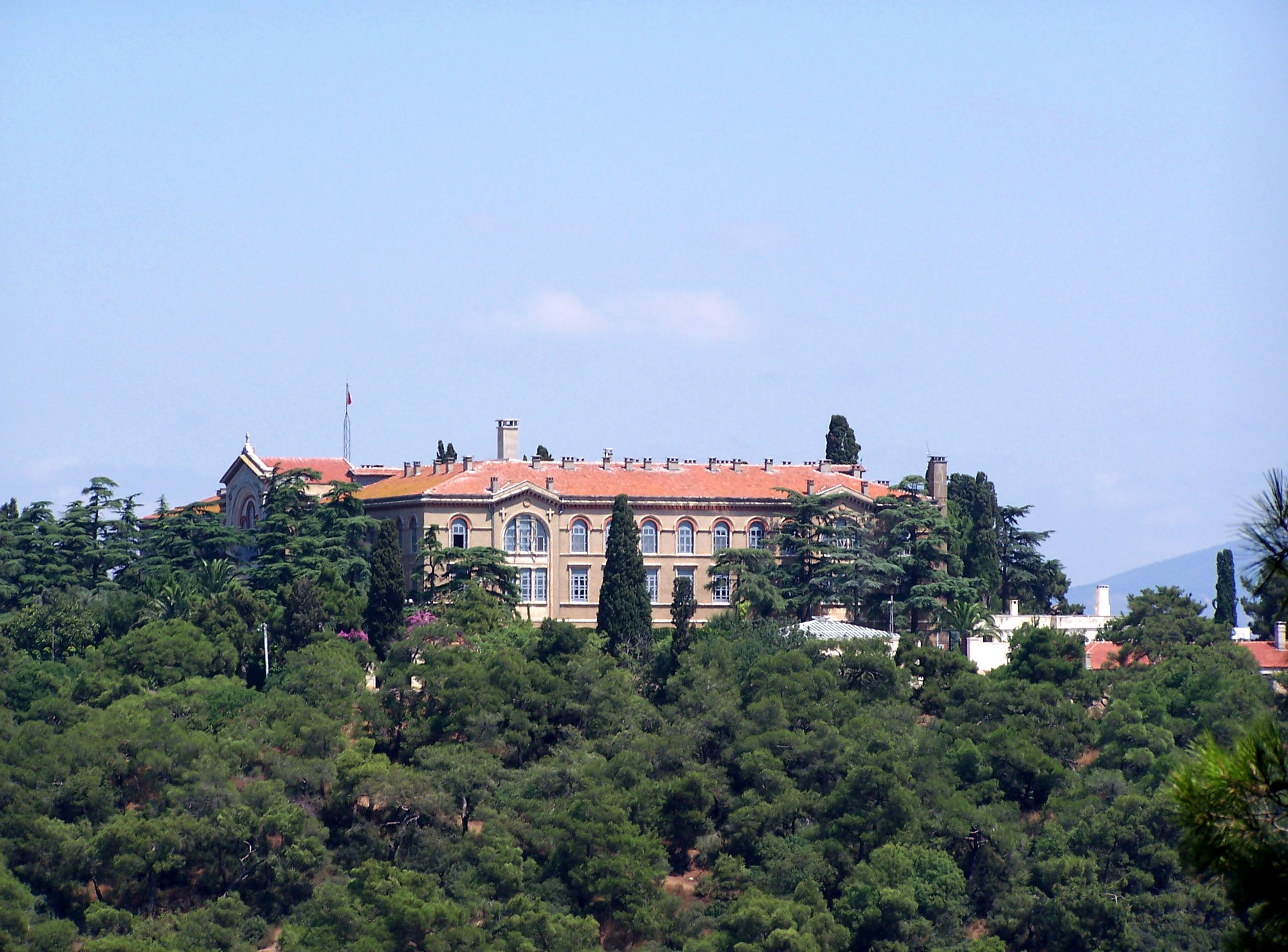
Halki Seminary.

- 1970–1971 In his survey of relics in the Greek Orthodox Church, German scholar Dr. Otto Meinardus found evidence for 3602 relics, out of approximately 3800 saints who were liturgically recognized by the end of the Ottoman period (1922). (Note: The 3602 relics originated from only 476 (12.5%) of the saints. Furthermore, five saints accounted for nearly a quarter (25%) of all these relics, including Sts. Charalampos, Panteleimon, Tryphon, Paraskevi, and George.)
- 1971 Halki Seminary, Orthodoxy's most prominent theological school, is closed by Turkish authorities breaching Article 40 of the Lausanne Treaty and Article 24 of the Turkish Constitution which both guarantee religious freedom and education; Abp. Makarios III (Mouskos) of Cyprus baptizes more than 5,000 into the Orthodox Church in Kenya, mostly from the Kikuyu tribe; the island of Tinos is proclaimed sacred by an act of parliament in 1971; (Note: The discovery of the icon just as the War of Independence against the Turks got under way was regarded as an omen and proof that God had willed the liberation of Greece.) the Church of Greece designated Pelagia of Tinos (†1834) a saint on 11 September.
- 1972–1973 Ecclesiastical coup in Cyprus fails to remove Abp. Makarios III from the Presidency.
- 1972 Death of missionary Archimandrite Chrysostomos Papasarantopoulos, having laboured to spread the Orthodox faith in Uganda, Kenya, Tanzania, and Congo; on 28 November, the Church of Greece reaffirmed its 1933 ban on Freemasonry, declaring and proclaiming that Freemasonry is a proven mystery religion. (Note: The 1933 decision of the Bishops of the Church of Greece was renewed with a new act, issued on 28 November 1972. Hence, the Hierarchy: "adheres strictly to the provisions in the act relating to Freemasonry. It is declared and proclaimed that Freemasonry is a proven mystery religion, a projection of the old pagan religions, most foreign and contrary to the revealed salvific truth of our Holy Church. It is declared categorically that the status of a person who is a Mason in whatever form, is incompatible with the status of a Christian member of the Body of Christ.")
- 1973 On 18 January the Synodal-Stavropegial Monastery of Panagia Chrysopigi («Παναγία η Χρυσοπηγή») is founded in Kapandriti, in the periphery of the Archdiocese of Athens, via a royal edict signed by Abp. Ieronimos Kotsonis of Athens; (Note: "A close associate of Archbishop Ieronimos Kotsonis during the 1967–74 dictatorship, Christodoulos managed in 1973 by a royal edict to lodge the fraternity on prime land just outside Athens. Surprisingly, the edict implied that the established monastery was not under the authority of the local bishop, but of the Holy Synod itself. That was an unprecedented privilege since it made Chrysopigi a secular, so to speak, monastery, whose members could by-bass or even undermine ecclesiastical hierarchy. Until today, Panagia Chrysopigi functions as a nursery for higher clergy of right-wing and nationalistic persuasions, providing staff in the most important Greek dioceses. In principle, of course, the Archbishop denied any relationship between politics and the Church but...the statement was to be dismissed each time an imagined threat to the Church and the nation emerged. Examples abound: Turkey, Albania, FYROM, globalisation, the Papacy, amoralism, atheism, communism, nihilism and so forth. The Archbishop's discourse on any of these subjects demonstrates that friends and foes do exist, as is only natural with a discourse that programmatically presents Greece and the Greek Orthodox Helleno-Christian tradition as being under siege by, inter alia, the forces of a godless modernity emanating from the west and the forces of barbarism in the East.") in Athens on Christmas 1973, an association called the "Theologians for Freedom and Dignity" published the document "Theological Declaration on Freedom and Dignity for Greek People from Greek Orthodox Theologians", denouncing the dictatorship in Greece. (Note: "Published (in English) through the courtesy and by the permission of the Hellenic American Society, Indianapolis, Indiana.")
- 1974 Turkish invasion of Cyprus, Turkish forces advance capturing the 37% of the island, (Note: "The Turkish army occupied almost 40 percent of the land area of the island, despite the fact that the Turkish population numbered less than 20 percent.") 3,000 are killed or missing, 200,000 become refugees; (Note: The Turkish policy of forcing a third of the island's Greek population from their homes in the occupied North, preventing their return, and settling Turks from the mainland in their places is considered an example of ethnic cleansing.) the Monarchy is voted out by a plebiscite vote of 69%.

== See also ==
- Eastern Orthodoxy in Greece
- List of archbishops of Athens
- Greek Orthodox Church
- Eastern Orthodox Church organization

History

- History of the Eastern Orthodox Church
- History of Eastern Christianity
- History of the Eastern Orthodox Church under the Ottoman Empire
- History of Eastern Orthodox Churches in the 20th century
- Timeline of Eastern Orthodoxy in America

Church Fathers

- Apostolic Fathers
- Church Fathers
- Ante-Nicene Fathers (book)
- Desert Fathers
- Nicene and Post-Nicene Fathers
- List of Church Fathers

== Bibliography ==
- Christos Yannaras. Orthodoxy and the West: Hellenic Self-Identity in the Modern Age. Transl. Peter Chamberas and Norman Russell. Brookline: Holy Cross Orthodox Press, 2006. ISBN 1-885652-81-X
- Giannēs Koliopoulos and Thanos Veremēs. Greece: The Modern Sequel, from 1831 to the Present. NYU Press, 2002. 407 pp. ISBN 9780814747674
- C.M. Woodhouse. Modern Greece. 4th ed. Boston : Faber and Faber, 1986.
- Demetrios J. Constantelos. Understanding the Greek Orthodox Church: Its Faith, History and Life. 4th Edition. Brookline, Mass.: Hellenic College Press, 2005. ISBN 9780917653506
- Dimitri E. Conomos, Graham Speake. Mount Athos, the Sacred Bridge: The Spirituality of the Holy Mountain. Oxford: Peter Lang, 2005.
- Effie Fokas. Religion in the Greek Public Sphere: Nuancing the Account. Journal of Modern Greek Studies. Volume 27, Number 2, October 2009, pp. 349–374.
- Herman A. Middleton. Precious Vessels of the Holy Spirit: The Lives & Counsels of Contemporary Elders of Greece. 2nd Ed. Protecting Veil Press, 2004.
- John L. Tomkinson. Between Heaven and Earth: The Greek Church. Anagnosis Books, Athens, 2004.
- Mother Nectaria McLees. EVLOGEITE! A Pilgrim's Guide to Greece. 1st Ed. St. Nicholas Press, Kansas City, MO, 2002. 927 pp.
- Norman Russell. Modern Greek Theologians and the Greek Fathers. Philosophy & Theology Volume 18, Issue 1. 2007.10.17. Pages 77–92. (ISSN 0890-2461)
- Rev. Dr. Nicon D. Patrinacos (M.A., D.Phil. (Oxon)). A Dictionary of Greek Orthodoxy – Λεξικον Ελληνικης Ορθοδοξιας. Light & Life Publishing, Minnesota, 1984.
- Rev. A. H. Hore. Eighteen centuries of the Orthodox Greek Church. London: James Parker & Co. 1899. 706pp. (Re-printed: Gorgias Press LLC, 2003.)
