= Eastern Orthodoxy in Greece =

Most practiced faith in Greece

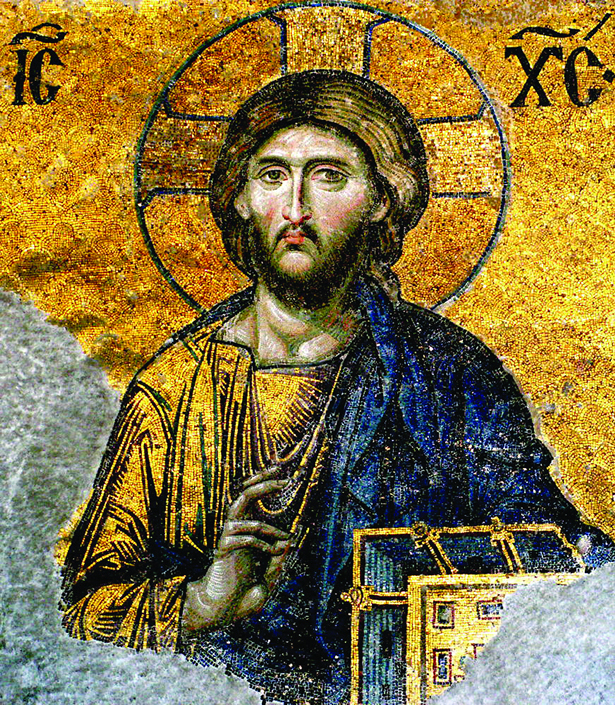
12th century mosaic of Christ Pantocrator.

Eastern Orthodoxy is by far the largest religious denomination in Greece.

== Status ==
The Greek Orthodox Church, a member of the Eastern Orthodox Communion, is described as the "prevailing religion" in Greece's constitution. Since 1850, Greek Orthodoxy within Greece is organized in the Church of Greece. Its members comprise between 95% and 98% of the population.

== Organization ==
Within Greece, the Greek Orthodox Church is organized into 81 dioceses. While the majority is part of the Church of Greece constituting the autocephalous church of Greece, the dioceses of Crete and the Dodecanese, and Mount Athos are under the direct jurisdiction of the Patriarchate of Constantinople. Yet another 30 dioceses in northern Greece and the major islands in the north and northeast Aegean are nominally under the jurisdiction of the Ecumenical Patriarchate of Constantinople, while being administered "in stewardship" as part of the Church of Greece.

Apart from these, various Greek Old Calendarist jurisdictions exist that are not in communion with the Eastern Orthodox Churches under the jurisdiction of the Ecumenical Patriarchate of Constantinople.

== Timeline of Eastern Orthodoxy in Greece ==
- Timeline of Eastern Orthodoxy in Greece (33–717)
- Timeline of Eastern Orthodoxy in Greece (717–1204)
- Timeline of Eastern Orthodoxy in Greece (1204–1453)
- Timeline of Eastern Orthodoxy in Greece (1453–1821)
- Timeline of Eastern Orthodoxy in Greece (1821–1924)
- Timeline of Eastern Orthodoxy in Greece (1924–1974)
- Timeline of Eastern Orthodoxy in Greece (1974–2008)
- Timeline of Eastern Orthodoxy in Greece (from 2008)
