= Konstantinos Oikonomos =

Greek theologian

- Κωνσταντίνος Οικονόμος
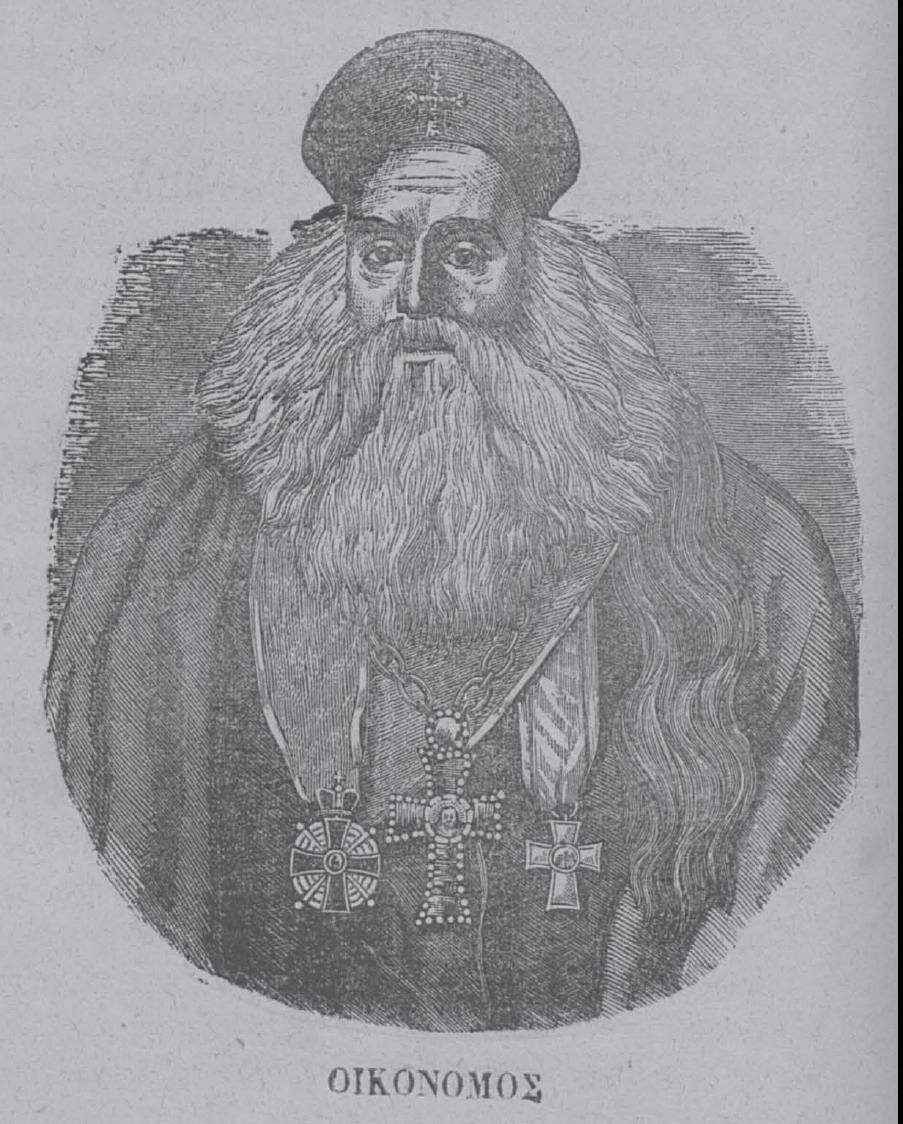
- Born: 1780

Konstantinos Oikonomos (born 1780) was a Greek theologian.

== Biography ==
Konstantinos Oikonomos was born in 1780 in Thessaly, Greece.

Oikonomos fled Constantinople in 1821 and settled in Odesa.

In 1991, a brass bust of Oikonomos was installed at the square of the Great School of the Nation in Athens.
