= Demetrios Constantelos =

Greek researcher (1927–2017)

Demetrios J. Constantelos (Greek: Δημήτριος Κωνσταντέλος; July 27, 1927 – January 10, 2017) was a Greek researcher in Byzantology and a professor emeritus of history and religious studies at Stockton University, Pomona, NJ. He was born in Spilia, Messenia, Greece. He was ordained a priest of the Greek Orthodox Archdiocese of America in 1955 and earned a PhD in Byzantine Civilization at Rutgers University in 1965.

On September 26, 2014, the then Richard Stockton College of New Jersey honored the Rev. Dr. Demetrios J. Constantelos by dedicating a space in the Bjork Library to him. Known as "The Constantelos Hellenic Collection and Reading Room," the space houses approximately 3,000 rare and important works from the personal library of Professor Constantelos and provides space for public programming, lectures, films, and seminars.

He served as a member of the New Revised Standard Version Translation Committee.

He died on 10 January 2017, at the age of 89. Funeral services occurred on January 16 of the same year in Egg Harbor, New Jersey.

== Publications ==
Publications by Demetrios Constantelos include:

- Christian Faith And Cultural Heritage : Essays from a Greek Orthodox Perspective
- Renewing the Church : The Significance of the Council in Trullo
- Paideia : Addresses to Young People
- The Complete Works of His Eminence Archbishop Iakovos, Primate of North and South America 1959-1996
- The Torchbearer : Encyclicals Spiritual and Ecclesiastical Subjects, Administration, Education, Culture
- Understanding the Greek Orthodox Church : Its Faith, History and Life
- Christian Hellenism, Volume Three : Essays and Studies in Continuity and Change
- The Greeks, Their Heritage, and Its Value Today
- Poverty, Society and Philanthropy in the Late Mediaeval Greek World
- Byzantine Philanthropy and Social Welfare
- Religious-Philosophical Issues and Interreligious Dialogues in the Orthodox Church Since World War II
- Orthodox Theology and Diakonia : Trends and Prospects Essays in Honor of His Eminence Archbishop Iakovos on the Occasion of His Seventieth Birthday
- Christian Hellenism: Essays and Studies in Continuity and Change (Hellenism: Ancient, Mediaeval Modern, 13) by Demetrios J. Constantelos ISBN 0-89241-588-6
