= Timeline of Eastern Orthodoxy in Greece (from 2008) =

This is a timeline of the presence of Eastern Orthodoxy in Greece from 2008. The history of Greece traditionally encompasses the study of the Greek people, the areas they ruled historically, as well as the territory now composing the modern state of Greece.

== Third Hellenic Republic (from 2008) ==
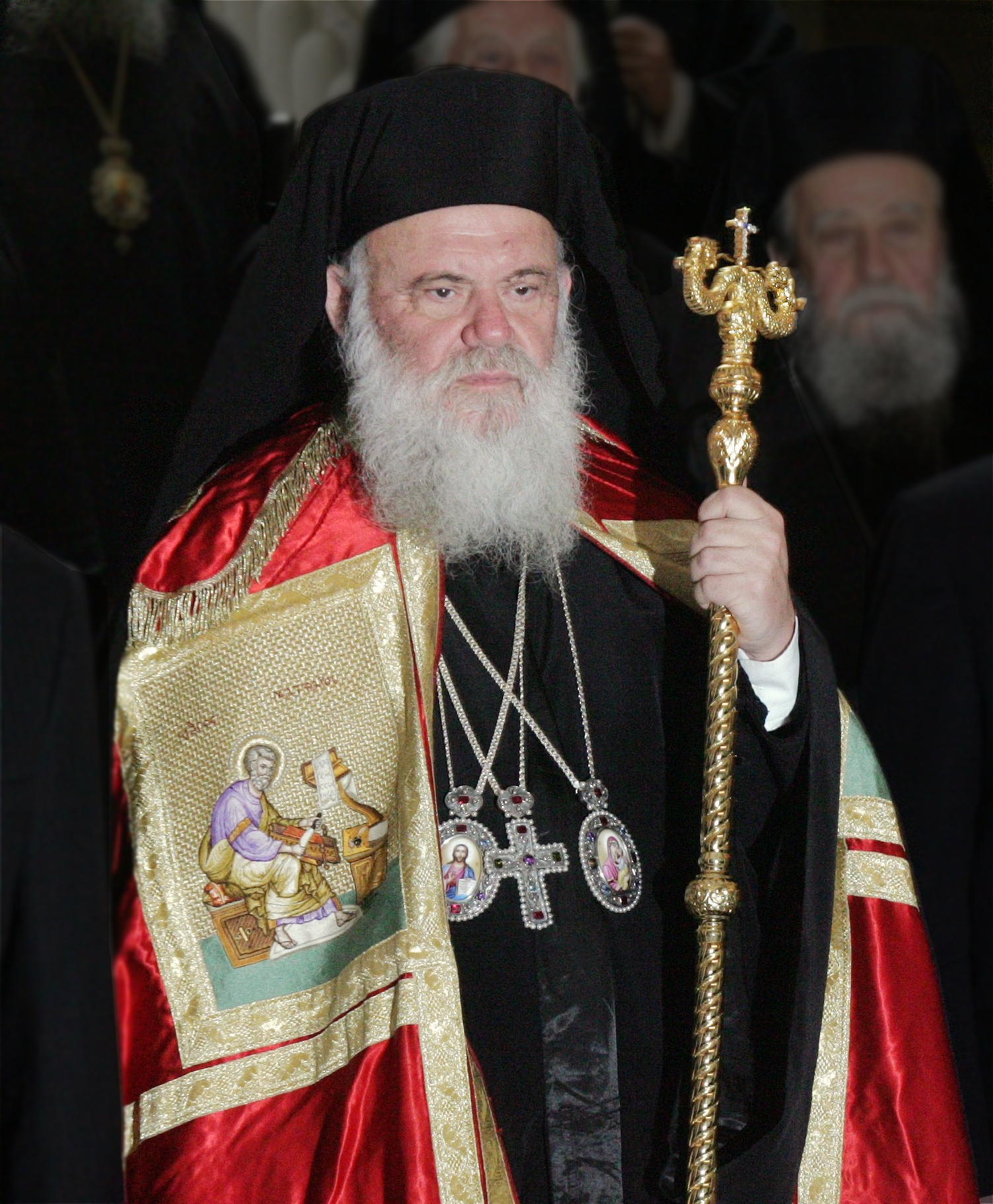
Archbishop Ieronymos II of Athens, (from 2008).

- 2008 Abp. Ieronymos II (Liapis) of Athens elected; Glorification of George (Karslidis) of Drama; Pan-Orthodox meeting in Constantinople in October of the Primates of the fourteen Eastern Orthodox Churches, signing a document calling for inter-orthodox unity and collaboration and "the continuation of preparations for the Holy and Great Council"; the 13-member standing committee of the Church of Greece denounced government plans to introduce a civil partnerships law, saying government support for common law marriage would amount to state-sanctioned "prostitution;" Ecumenical Patriarch Bartholomew Addresses European Parliament; the relics of Saint Peter of Argos are returned to Argos, Greece, from a monastery chapel in Rome belonging to a Spanish order of monks; (Note: The town of Argos had launched a search for the remains of its own Saint Peter, who was a 10th-century local bishop, 17 years ago, the current bishop told AFP. "We had looked everywhere for the relics, in Venice and the Vatican, before we finally found them in a monastery chapel in Rome", bishop Iakovos said. The chapel belongs to a Spanish order of monks, whose prior Renato Salvatore had no objection to returning the relics. The remains of Saint Peter of Argos had been removed to Rome in the 15th century during the occupation of the Peloponnese by the Franks.) the Arab-Hellenic Center for Culture and Civilization was established in Athens, financed with a donation of around US$3.4 million by 'Europe Trust', a UK-based fund closely related with the Muslim Brotherhood's umbrella organization 'Federation of Islamic Organizations in Europe'. (Note: During the opening ceremony the Ambassadors of several Islamic states were present, along with a notable delegation of Imams related to the Muslim Brotherhood from across Europe and several Islamic NGO's from all over the world. The center has a 2.000 Sq. meters space and also serves as a prayer establishment, thus Athens already has a Mosque, albeit not officially known as such.)
- 2008–2014 According to a Bank of Greece report, over 427,000 people (ages 15 to 64) left Greece since 2008, marking the third wave of mass emigration in the 20th and 21st centuries. (Note: Over the past century, Greece has seen two other major exoduses, one between 1903 and 1917 and the other between 1960 and 1972. The difference between the first two and the current one is that in the 20th century, it was mostly unskilled workers and farmers that left while now educated professionals and young graduates are leading the exodus.)
- 2009 In the aftermath of the 2008 financial crisis, the Greek government-debt crisis began in late 2009, also known as the Greek Depression, with a series of sudden reforms and austerity measures leading to impoverishment and loss of income and property of the Greek populace, as well as a small-scale humanitarian crisis; led by three senior Archbishops, a group of Orthodox clergy in Greece published the manifesto, A Confession of Faith Against Ecumenism, pledging to resist all ecumenical ties with Roman Catholics and Protestants, amongst its signatories including six metropolitans, 49 archimandrites, 22 hieromonks, 30 nuns and abbesses, and many other priests and church elders; Orthodox-Roman Catholic Joint Commission meets in Paphos, Cyprus, 11th plenary, studying the theme "The Role of the Bishop of Rome in the Communion of the Church in the First Millennium;" US President Barack Obama made an explicit appeal in his speech to the Turkish Parliament for the reopening of the hotly contested Greek Orthodox Theological Seminary on Halki; Russian Orthodox Patr. Kirill of Moscow called on Turkish authorities to re-open the Theological Seminary on Halki; repose of Elder Joseph of Vatopedi a noted twentieth century monastic regarded as one of the few remaining true Athonite elders; the first complete German-language translation of the Septuagint was published by the German Bible Society under the title "Septuaginta Deutsch", founded on the Göttingen Septuagint edition, and the Rahlfs edition for the books not yet contained in that version; (Note: "Unlike NETS, LXX.D is the first German translation of the entire Septuagint...Another difference between NETS and LXX.D is posed by the fact that the latter is the product of a Bible society, in this case the German Bible Society (Deutsche Bibelgesellschaft). As a result, the format and lay-out, the audience, the number of contributors and the general focus of LXX.D differs considerably from NETS. Whereas the latter addresses the scholarly world by means of a justification of the interlinear model, the former addresses members of German religious communities either with a Jewish, Greek Orthodox, Roman Catholic, or Lutheran background. Whereas NETS has been produced by a comparatively small team of some 32 translators, the list of contributors to LXX.D (pp. 1469–73) counts no less than 111 "Mitarbeiterinnen und Mitarbeiter," including translators, correctors, editors, and specialists in Classical philology and Orthodox liturgy. LXX.D pays considerable attention to the reading of the Septuagint in the Orthodox churches. Furthermore, LXX.D has undergone a thorough editorial process resulting into an (almost) error-free publication. The headings, notes, and introductions greatly enhance the accessibility of the German translation.") the European Court of Human Rights ruled that Turkey violated the property rights of the Bozcaada Kimisis Teodoku Greek Orthodox Church on the Aegean island of Bozcaada; (Note: The Ecumenical Patriarchate has filed more than two dozen cases with the European Court of Human Rights to recover some of the thousands of properties it has lost.) Patr. Mor Ignatius Zakka I Iwas of the Oriental Church of Antioch went on an official visit to Greece, to renew the relationship between both churches; Greek Orthodox Church urges Christians across Europe to unite in an appeal against a ban on crucifixes in classrooms in Italy; Viktor Yanukovych makes pilgrimage to Mount Athos; over 1,000 Muslims rallied in Athens over unsubstantiated claims that Greek police allegedly tore up and trampled on the Quran.
- 2010 The Metropolis of Attica was split into 2 new Metropolises: the Metropolis of Kifissia, Amaroussion and Oropos, and the Metropolis of Ilion, Acharnes and Petroupolis; on Sunday, 15 August, 2010 Ecumenical Patriarch Bartholomew I conducted the first Divine Liturgy in 88 years at the historic monastery of Panagia Soumela in Trapezounta, northeastern Turkey, marking the first official religious service carried out at the ancient monastery since the foundation of the modern Turkish Republic; (Note: In May 2010 Turkey sent a letter to the patriarch authorizing the Divine Liturgy to be celebrated here once a year on 15 August, in a gradual loosening of restrictions on religious expression. The gesture appeared aimed at Turkey's own Greek Orthodox minority, thought today to number around 2,000 people. In a similar gesture to Turkey's Armenian minority, Ankara also authorized mass to be celebrated in September at the museum-church of Akdamar, in the eastern Van province. Turkey's government is seeking to improve the lot of ethnic and religious minorities in line with its bid to join the European Union. Activists say the change is too slow. A key Orthodox Christian demand is the reopening of the Theological School of Halki near Istanbul;) death of Metr. Augoustinos Kantiotes of Florina, a prolific spiritual writer and defender of traditional Orthodox theology. death of painter, illustrator, engraver and writer Rallis Kopsidis (1929–2010), a student of Photis Kontoglou who was inspired by the Macedonian (11th–14th c.) and Cretan (14th–17th c.) Schools, who took part in painting the frescoes of the Byzantine Church of Chevetogne Abbey in Belgium (1955–57) as well as the church of the Orthodox Centre of the Ecumenical Patriarchate in Chambesy, Geneva, considered one of the pioneers of his generation even though his work is not particularly well known; Croatian Roman Catholic Archdiocese of Zadar gives cherished relic of St. Simeon to the Greek Orthodox Patriarchate of Jerusalem. (Note: The mummified body of St. Simeon was taken from Jerusalem to Constantinople in the 13th century, and was apparently destined for Venice when a storm on the Adriatic Sea forced the ship off course toward what is now Croatia. The saint’s remains have been venerated in Zadar since that time. In 2007, during a pilgrimage to the Holy Land, Archbishop Ivan Prenđa of Zadar met with the Greek Orthodox Patriarch Theophilus III of Jerusalem, and agreed to provide a relic of St. Simeon to be venerated in an Orthodox monastery dedicated to the saint. Archbishop Prendja died in January of this year [2010], but his successor, Archbishop Želimir Puljić, carried out his promise in a ceremony in Zadak, turning over the relic to representatives of the Orthodox patriarchate.)

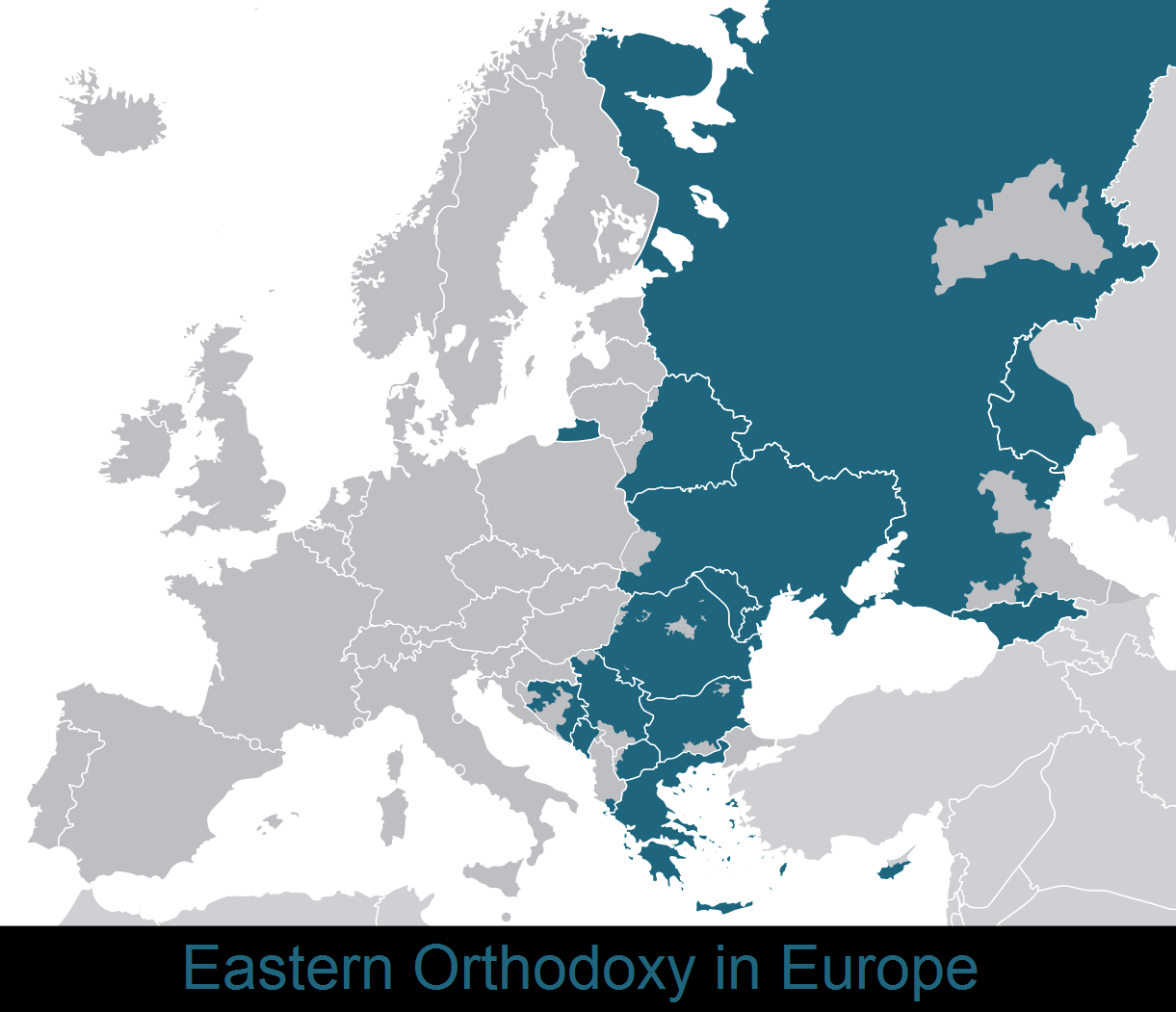
Distribution of Eastern Orthodoxy in Europe.

- 2011 The Governments of Armenia, Bulgaria, Cyprus, the Russian Federation, Greece, Lithuania, Malta, and the Republic of San Marino filed a joint submission as a third-party intervener in the case of Lautsi v. Italy (Application no. 30814/06) in the European Court of Human Rights, arguing that the cross was a symbol deeply ingrained in their respective heritages and that to extend the values of a secular State to the whole of Europe would represent the "Americanisation" of Europe in that a single and unique rule and a rigid separation of Church and State would be binding on everyone, (Note: "C. Submissions of the third-party interveners" "1. The Governments of Armenia, Bulgaria, Cyprus, the Russian Federation, Greece, Lithuania, Malta and the Republic of San Marino" "47. In their joint observations submitted at the hearing, the Governments of Armenia, Bulgaria, Cyprus, the Russian Federation, Greece, Lithuania, Malta and the Republic of San Marino indicated that in their view the Chamber's reasoning had been based on a misunderstanding of the concept of "neutrality", which the Chamber had confused with "secularism". They pointed out that there was a huge diversity of Church-State arrangements in Europe and that more than half the population of Europe lived in non-secular States. They added that State symbols inevitably had a place in state education and that many of these had a religious origin, the Cross – which was both a national and a religious symbol – being the most visible example. In their view, in non-secular European States the presence of religious symbols in the public space was widely tolerated by the secular population as part of national identity. States should not have to divest themselves of part of their cultural identity simply because that identity was of religious origin. The position adopted by the Chamber was not an expression of the pluralism manifest in the Convention system, but an expression of the values of a secular State. To extend it to the whole of Europe would represent the "Americanisation" of Europe in that a single and unique rule and a rigid separation of Church and State would be binding on everyone. In their submission, favouring secularism was a political position that, whilst respectable, was not neutral. Accordingly, in the educational sphere a State that supported the secular as opposed to the religious was not being neutral. Similarly, removing crucifixes from classrooms where they had always been would not be devoid of educational consequences. In reality, whether the State opted to allow or prohibit the presence of crucifixes in classrooms, the important factor was the degree to which the curriculum contextualised and taught children tolerance and pluralism. The intervening Governments acknowledged that there might be circumstances where the arrangements by the State were unacceptable. The burden of proof should remain on the individual, however, and the Court should intervene only in extreme cases.") with the Grand Chamber of the European Court of Human Rights ruling on 18 March 2011, by a majority (15 votes to two) that there was no violation of Article 2 of Protocol No. 1 (the right to education) and no separate issue under Article 9 (the rights of freedom of thought, conscience, and religion) to the European Convention on Human Rights, thus upholding the display in public places of religious and cultural symbols and affirming freedom of religion; (Note: "The newly aggressive atheism promoted by the likes of Professor Richard Dawkins (like Sir Julius (Huxley), an evolutionary biologist) and the National Secular Society makes the mistake of thinking that freedom of religion and freedom from religion require secularism. But they are not the same thing; secularism is optional, but freedom to practise any religion, or none, is a human right (something the European Court of Human Rights upheld, incidentally, in the case of Lautsi v. Italy last year). Whether or not one is religious, these tiresome attempts to marginalise Christianity ought to be resisted.") on Sunday 3 April 2011, at 9:30 pm, in the Church of the Holy Trinity in Kalymnos, the face of Christ crowned with thorns appeared in the icon of the Virgin Mary on the iconostasis; (Note: Metropolitan Paisios of Leros and Kalymnos was immediately notified of this and came to the church to see for himself. He told the people that God sends these signs in order to draw His people closer to Him. Thousands of clergy and faithful have come to the church to see this miracle in the middle of Great Lent. It was originally seen by women who were in the church chanting the lamentations to the Virgin Mary. When the image appeared the oil candle above the icon began to move, though the others stood still.) canonization of 1241 New Martyrs of Naoussa, Greece, massacred by the Ottomans from Thursday of Bright Week to the Sunday of Thomas in 1822. Metropolitan Hilarion (Alfeyev) of Volokolamsk, chairman of the Department of External Church Relations of the Russian Orthodox Church, visits the Greek Orthodox Church; launch of "The Great Orthodox Christian Encyclopedia" 12-Volume set, blessed and sponsored by Ecumenical Patriarch Bartholomew I of Constantinople, Patriarch Theodore II of Alexandria, Patriarch Ignatius IV of Antioch, Patriarch Theophilos III of Jerusalem, Archbishop Chrysostomos II of Cyprus, Archbishop Ieronymos II of Athens and All Greece, and others; Chief Rabbi Yona Metzger signed a historic declaration on 6 December 2011, in Nicosia, Cyprus, with Archbishop Chrysostomos, primate of the Church of Cyprus, in which both of them promised to deepen relations between the Church and the Jewish people; (Note: The declaration affirms the illegitimacy of the doctrine of collective Jewish guilt for the deicide of Jesus. It was the first time an Orthodox church has explicitly repudiated this doctrine, which was one of the most important factors in the development of religious anti-Semitism in Europe.) Greek Orthodox Church officials wrote a letter to the president of the European Commission, José Barroso protesting the hardships the Greek people were being made to suffer; (Note: "Man, and the European citizen in particular, cannot be seen by the managers of the economic crisis as an accounting figure. It would be a scandal if European leaders did not take the cries of simple citizens into account and if these very citizens of Europe were threatened like expendable products. The result of all this is the increase of agony, of despair, of the shrinking of national sovereignty, of the splitting of the family, of the complete isolation of the most vulnerable social groups (the disabled, immigrants, senior citizens, etc.), the spread of fear and eventually the creation of a society with no moral rules. As a Church, we cannot accept this social model. We cannot accept the alteration of our European acquis by the adoption of the rules of impersonal financial markets and credit rating agencies. This situation is leading us to the utter shattering of social cohesion by excluding any form of convergence towards the European vision of our founding fathers.") a December 2011 nationwide survey conducted by Metron Analysis (one of the biggest independent market research and public opinion survey companies in Greece), 95% of those polled reported that they were Orthodox Christians, while 1.5% said that they belong to some other religion, and 2.8% of the population said that they were irreligious or atheist, which is among the lowest figures in Europe.
- 2012 Ecumenical Patriarch Bartholomew gave a landmark address at the Turkish Parliament's Constitution Conciliation Commission, tasked with drafting a new constitution for Turkey, presenting an 18-page report demanding equal treatment and rights for Turkey's non-Muslim communities, including state-aid for churches and minority schools; (Note: The subcommittee also heard the demands of Turkey's Assyrian Christian community, represented by Kuryakos Ergün, the head of the Syriac Mor Gabriel Monastery Foundation.) the Greek Orthodox Church of Albania rejected an official census in the Balkan country suggesting that ethnic Greeks represent just 6.75 percent of the overall population, with the Church instead claiming that the figure is at 24 percent, slightly above that of previous censuses that put the percentage at 20.7 percent in 1942 and 22.3 percent in 1927; (Note: The church said the ostensible drop was recorded because this year's survey did not make it mandatory for respondents to state their religion.) in June the Church of Cyprus gave a part of the holy relics of St. Lazarus to a delegation of the Russian Orthodox Church led by Patriarch Kirill of Moscow and All Russia; (Note: The relics were translated to Moscow on 11 June 2012, and were given to Archbishop Arseniy of Istra, who took them to the Zachatievsky monastery (Conception Convent), where they were put up for veneration.) in October, Abp. Ieronymos spoke out against Europe's handling of the financial crisis in Greece which, he said, is encroaching on the debt-hit nation's sovereignty; (Note: "We Greeks are experiencing a peculiar war. I feel we are under occupation, our sovereignty is on the wane and we are the victims of all-out usury," Ieronymos said in an interview with Skai Television.) in November Metr. Seraphim (Mentzelopoulos) of Piraeus filed a blasphemy complaint against the director and actors of the theatrical play "Corpus Christi," which portrayed Jesus and the Apostles as gay men; (Note: The law prohibits offenses against "religious peace," including blasphemy and religious insult. Blasphemy cases can be brought before civil and criminal courts, and in some cases civil courts issue orders to prevent the presentation of art or media deemed blasphemous in advance of their public release. The law also allows any prosecutor to order the seizure of publications that offend Christianity or any other religion. In this case, an Athens prosecutor pressed charges, but no trial date was set. The theater cancelled performances of the play a few days after its October premiere due to violent protests by some Greek Orthodox priests and Golden Dawn supporters. Several Golden Dawn members of parliament blocked the entrance of the theater and clashed with police on opening night.) in 2012 deaths in Greece outnumbered births by 16,300, while 44,200 more people left the country than moved to it; the number of employed people was 3.8 million compared to 4.1 million pensioners and the unemployed, out of a population of 11,062,500; commenting to the BBC on the issue of constructing a mosque in Athens, Metr. Seraphim (Mentzelopoulos) of Piraeus remarked that "Greece suffered five centuries of Islamic tyranny under Turkish rule and building a mosque would offend the martyrs who freed us," adding that "we are not a multicultural country." (Note: "Orthodox Christianity goes to the heart of what it means to be Greek and the Bishop here, Seraphim, says his nation must preserve its identity. "Greece suffered five centuries of Islamic tyranny under Turkish rule and building a mosque would offend the martyrs who freed us," he says..."We are not a multicultural country,...we are one Greek nation and everything else is an invention of the 'new order' and of Zionism. They are trying to corrupt our character." ")
- 2013 Plot to assassinate Ecumenical Patriarch Bartholomew uncovered by Turkish police; Ecumenical Patriarch Bartholomew opens seminar on religious freedom celebrating the 1700th anniversary of the Edict of Milan; the EU published guidelines to the promotion and protection of freedom of religion or belief (FoRB); Patriarch Kirill I of Moscow and all Rus’ made an official visit to Greece; (Note: "We are always by your side, I think of Greek people every day," said Kirill I of Moscow, who is paying an official visit to Greece, the first such visit of a Primate of the Russian Orthodox Church in 21 years. On Monday 3 June Patriarch Kirill had Greece's highest honor confirmed on him, receiving the medal of the Grand Cross of the Order of Honour from Greek President Karolos Papoulias.) Patr. Kirill I of Moscow visited Mount Athos, accompanied by Metr. Hilarion of Volokolamsk, head of the Department for External Church Relations, visiting several monasteries and hermitages, venerating their shrines and celebrating the Divine Liturgy at the Russian Monastery of St. Panteleimon; Metr. Seraphim (Mentzelopoulos) of Piraeus condemned the position of the Pope, and others, on 4 March 2013, in an encyclical on the Sunday of Orthodoxy, during which those who have abandoned Orthodoxy for heresy are traditionally condemned; (Note: (in Greek) "Ἰδιαιτέρως πρέπει νά τονισθεῖ ὅτι πηγή καί μήτρα τοῦ Οἰκουμενισμοῦ τυγχάνει ἡ Μασωνία, πού προωθεῖ δι’ αὐτοῦ τήν παγκόσμια θρησκεία τοῦ Ἐωσφορισμοῦ, ὅπως καί τῆς Μασωνίας πηγή καί μήτρα εἶναι ὁ φρικώδης διεθνής Σιωνισμός. Ὑπάρχει ἕνα προκαθορισμένο σχέδιο ἑνώσεως, πού ὁδηγεῖ στήν διαμυστηριακή κοινωνία (intercommunion) πασῶν τῶν αἱρέσεων καί τῶν θρησκειῶν, στήν ἐπιβολή τῆς πανθρησκείας καί τό ὁποῖο ἀποτελεῖται ἀπό τρεῖς φάσεις. Ἡ πρώτη φάση τοῦ σχεδίου ἑνώσεως εἶναι ἡ ἕνωση ὅλων τῶν χριστιανικῶν ὁμολογιῶν, δηλ. ὁ διαχριστιανικός οἰκουμενισμός. Ἡ δεύτερη φάση εἶναι ἡ ἕνωση ὅλων τῶν θρησκειῶν, δηλ. ὁ διαθρησκειακός οἰκουμενισμός καί ἡ τρίτη φάση εἶναι ἡ ἕνωση ὅλων τῶν ὁμολογιῶν καί τῶν θρησκειῶν, δηλ. ἡ ἐπιβολή τῆς πανθρησκείας, μέ ἀρχηγό τόν αἱρεσιάρχη Πάπα τῆς Ρώμης, ὁ ὁποῖος θά παραδώσει τήν παγκόσμια ἐξουσία στόν Ἀντίχριστο.") in a letter in late March to Abp. Ieronymos of Athens and All-Greece, Patr. Bartholomew responded that he was especially concerned by the recent statement by Metr. Seraphim invoking an anathema against the pope, Protestants, Jews, Muslims and Ecumenists; on 27 June 2013, Metr. Seraphim (Mentzelopoulos) of Piraeus sent a 73-page epistle to Patr. Bartholomew about the subject of Ecumenism; the Greek Parliament passed a bill lifting the ban on Sunday shopping, liberalizing the country's trading laws as demanded by the Troika of international lenders in exchange for further bailout aid, protested by the Church of Greece and more than seventeen Greek trade unions; (Note: Greece's Orthodox church objected to scrapping the Sunday holiday, saying this day should be strictly reserved for rest and religious duties. "Sunday is dedicated to God. Sunday should be a holiday to give Christians the chance to worship their God and rest after a week-long labour," the Holy Synod, the Greek church's governing body has said. Under the new law, shops of up to 250 square meters could open seven Sundays a year – during Christmas, Easter and sales periods. Under certain location criteria local administration heads can extend the number to a total of 53 Sundays especially for tourist areas.) Church of Greece draws up a three-year financial plan in an effort to determine the size of its debt and to exploit its assets, according to Abp. Ieronymos II (Liapis) of Athens; the US House subcommittee for European affairs called the Turkish government to "facilitate the reopening of the Ecumenical Patriarchate's Theological School of Halki without condition or further delay"; on 27 November, the Sacred and Holy Synod of the Ecumenical Patriarchate formally glorified Elder Porphyrios (Bairaktaris) of Kafsokalivia († 1991) and Venerable Meletios of Ypseni († 19th century); (Note: Meletios of Ypseni (in Rhodes), also known as Meletios of Lardos.) the Russian Orthodox Church recognized the primacy of Constantinople in a special document having a Synodal status. (Note: "The order in diptychs has been changing in history. In the first millennium of church history, the primacy of honour used to belong to the chair of Rome. After the Eucharistic community between Rome and Constantinople was broken in the mid-11th century, primacy in the Orthodox Church went to the next chair in the diptych order, namely, to that of Constantinople. Since that time up to the present, the primacy of honour in the Orthodox Church on the universal level has belonged to the Patriarch of Constantinople as the first among equal Primates of Local Orthodox Churches.")
- 2014 The Gifts of the Wise Men to the Infant Jesus were brought to Moscow's Christ the Savior Cathedral by Archimandrite Parthenios, Igumen of the Monastery of Agios Pavlos on Mount Athos, together with the monks of the monastery, who handed the special ciborium to Patriarch Kirill I of Moscow, who placed it the center of the Cathedral; (Note: It is the first time the relics left Greece in more than 500 years.) (Note: (in Greek) "Τα Δώρα των Μάγων είναι ένα από τα λίγα κειμήλια, που συνδέονται με την επίγεια παρουσία του Χριστού και σχεδόν το μόνο που αφορά τη Γέννησή Του. Τα δώρα μετέφερε στη Ρωσία ο Καθηγούμενος της Ιεράς Μονής Αγίου Παύλου του Αγίου Όρους, Αρχιμ. Παρθένιος με μοναχούς της Μονής. Ο Ηγούμενος Παρθένιος παρέδωσε στον Πατριάρχη το ειδικό κιβώριο, το οποίο στη συνέχεια ο Πατριάρχης Κύριλλος τοποθέτησε στο κέντρο του Καθεδρικού Ναού.") Sacred Synaxis of the Primates of the Orthodox Churches at the Phanar from 6–9 March, in order to deliberate on matters pertaining to the entire Orthodox Church throughout the world and procedural issues for the convocation of the Holy and Great Council; Abp. Ieronymos declared his support for the Robben Island Declaration for the Freedom of Marwan Barghouhti and all Palestinian Prisoners; Metropolitans Seraphim of Piraeus and Andrew of Dryinoupolis of the Church of Greece, write a lengthy epistle sent to Pope Francis on 10 April 2014, concerning his past, the abysmal State of Papism, and a plea to return to Holy Orthodoxy; death of renowned lay theologian, philologist and charismatic preacher Nikolaos Sotiropoulos, a fiery Orthodox traditionalist who was excommunicated by the Holy Synod of Constantinople in July 1993; (Note: Nikolaos Sotiropoulos was born on 15 April 1934 in Palaiopirgos, in the Nafpaktia region of Greece. He received his degrees from the University of Athens as a Professor of Theology and Professor of Literature, with honors. He became the student and spiritual son of Metropolitan Augoustinos Kantiotes (1907–2010), the Bishop of the Holy Metropolis of Florina, Prespai, and Eordaia in northern Greece, and a defender of traditional Orthodoxy both in Greece and abroad. Sotiropoulos published many volumes, including Interpretation of the New Testament (Ερμηνεια Καινησ Διαθηκησ), and Interpretation of the Acts of the Apostles (Ερμηνεια Των Πραξεων Των Αποστολων), as well as many others. He was a founder and director of the Orthodox missionary brotherhood "The Cross" ("O Stavros") for many years (which assumed the form of a brotherhood in 1966). He also went on speaking tours to address Hellenic communities throughout Europe, America, Canada and Australia. He was excommunicated for the rest of his life by the Holy Synod of Constantinople in July 1993, for openly criticizing Archbishop Stylianos (Harkianakis) of Australia in 1988, and for his "divisive" behaviour. He died on 28 August 2014 in Patras. He was unmarried and did not have any direct descendants. His funeral was held on 29 August 2014, at the Monastery of the Entrance of the Virgin Mary, in the village of Myrtia in Aetolia-Acarnania, in the presence of the Bishops of Aetolia and Acarnania (Kosmas Papachristou), Piraeus (Seraphim Mentzenopoulos), Gortynos (Ieremias Foundas), and others.) death of Archimandrite Nikodemos Bilalis of New Skete (Mount Athos), a scholar, philologist and prolific writer, and founder of the "Panhellenic Union of Friends of the Polyteknon" (mothers of many children); Metr. Gerasimos (Michaleas) of San Francisco officiated at the Thyranoixia (Opening of the Doors) service of the Holy Transfiguration Greek Orthodox Church in South Anchorage, Alaska, being the northernmost parish of the Greek Orthodox Archdiocese of America and the only Greek Orthodox Church in the State of Alaska; Greek Orthodox Church bans religious rites for those who choose cremation; (Note: "The incineration of the body is not in keeping with the traditions and actions of the Church, for anthropological and theological reasons," the Church said in a statement. Cremation was only made legal in Greece in 2006 and there is still nowhere it can be carried out in the country.) His Beatitude John X, Patriarch of Antioch and All the East conducted his irenic first visit to the Church of Greece from 23 to 27 October at the invitation of His Beatitude Ieronymos II; (Note: While he attended an extraordinary session of the Synod of the Church of Greece, His Beatitude and the accompanying delegation examined with their brothers how to make shared cooperation between the two sister churches effective at the pastoral, theological and social levels. The two sides also agreed on the necessity of proper preparation for the Great and Holy Council that is to be held in the city of Istanbul (Constantinople) in 2016. And concern for the Christians of the Middle East, especially the children of the See of Antioch in Syria, Lebanon and Iraq was raised with His Excellency the President of Greece, the Prime Minister and the Foreign Minister.) in September, Greek lawmakers passed a bill toughening anti-racism laws and making Holocaust denial a criminal act; Metr. Amvrosios of Kalavryta and Aigialeia adamantly spoke out against the "anti-racist law" passed in Greece, stating that "a priest who will speak up against Jehovah’s Witnesses and other religions from the ambo, may be declared a racist and imprisoned," adding that "soon we will become aliens in our own home country...your children will surely be slaves of Muslims...Greece is disappearing, faith is disappearing"; in November, a 'Synaxis of Greek Orthodox Clergy and Monastics' , including Protopresbyters Dr. George Metallinos and Dr. Theodoros Zisis, launched a petition to oppose the new "divided church" ecclesiology of Patriarch Bartolomew, (Note: "Divided Church" Ecclesiology, or the so-called "Branch Theory" was condemned at the Jubilee Council of 2000 of the Church of Russia. This echoed the anathema of ecumenism of the Council of Bishops of the Russian Orthodox Church Outside Russia in 1983.) being signed by some 2000 Orthodox Christians at the time of its initial publication, including six hierarchs of the Church of Greece, (Note: Andrew of Dryinoupolis, Seraphim of Piraeus, Paul of Glyfada, Seraphim of Kythira, Kosmas of Aetolia and Akarnanias, and Jeremiah of Gortynos.) and many abbots, clergy, monastics, and laity; the head of the Vatican Pope Francis visited Istanbul on 29 and 30 November for the Ecumenical Joint-Prayer service with Ec. Patr. Bartholomew on the Feast of St. Andrew; (Note: "An 'Ecumenical Doxology' was held at the Ecumenical Patriarch’s church in Istanbul that evening, at which, Pope Francis was accorded honours as a bishop in being received with Bartholomew at the doors of the church. During 'Ecumenical Doxology', Pope Francis was commemorated officially as "Pope", with Bartholomew commemorated immediately after. It is standard practice for the Ecumenical Patriarchate to commemorate the heretical Vatican leader upon his visit, for example, during the 2009 visit of Benedict to the Phanar, the same happened. Orthodox theology prohibits such commemorations, but, Patriarch Bartholomew has been well-known to be liberal and modernistic on many such issues.") Pope Francis bowed to receive a kiss and the blessing of Ec. Patr. Bartholomew during joint prayer service in the Patriarchal Cathedral of St George at the Phanar; (Note: "I ask a favour: bless me and the Church of Rome," Francis said, before turning to Patriarch Bartholomew and bowing.) in a Special Eurobarometer poll, Cyprus had the highest proportion of respondents in the EU (21%) who said that religion was the most important value for them personally, while Greece had the third-highest proportion of respondents (15%).
- 2015 On 13 January, the Sacred and Holy Synod of the Ecumenical Patriarchate formally glorified Elder Paisios of Mount Athos († 1994); Aristides Baltas, the Greek Minister of Culture, Education and Religious Affairs, stated at a meeting of Parliament that the new government would be launching the process of separation of church and state in the near future; for the first time in over a thousand years, the largest portion of the sacred relics of Saint Barbara were transferred to Athens from Venice, on loan for two weeks from 10 May to 24 May and hosted at the Shrine of Saint Barbara in the municipality of Agia Varvara, after a highly symbolic move by the Roman Catholic Church who decided to respond positively to the request of the Apostoliki Diakonia of the Church of Greece on its upcoming 80th anniversary; (Note: The sacred relics of Saint Barbara were originally kept in Constantinople, and were transferred to Venice in 1003 during the reign of Doge Pietro II Orseolo, when Basil II was Emperor. They were brought to Venice from Constantinople by Maria Argyra (or Maria Argyropoula), who was regarded as one of the sisters of Emperor Romanos III Argyros (based on her last name), after she married the son of the Doge, Giovanni. Originally at Saint Mark’s in Venice, the relics were transferred to a church in Torcello, before being brought to Saint Martin on the island of Murano.) at a meeting hosted by the Greek Orthodox Church's Refugee and Migrant Center (KSPM-ERP), and attended by the General Secretary of the Churches’ Commission for Migrants in Europe (CCME) and other officials, Abp. Ieronymos II of Athens stated that refugees arriving at European borders should be hosted not only by Greece but by all other EU countries as well, proportional to the population of each, noting that illegal immigrants suffer because of the Western World's actions; (Note: On 9 June 2015 the European Union urged its 28 nations to swiftly endorse its two-year plan to relocate 40,000 Syrian and Eritrean migrants, as 1,000 more migrants arrived in Greece in just one day. Greek authorities said that more than 1,000 people had entered the country by sea, bringing its five-month total to about 50,000 — well above the number who arrived in Greece for all of 2014. Of the 40,000 migrants, the Commission proposed that 24,000 people be redistributed from Italy and 16,000 from Greece. The Commission announced its redistribution plan – European Agenda on Migration – on 13 May 2015, as a part of a wider response to the Mediterranean crisis, providing for the acceptance of up to 20,000 refugees a year and an automatic redistribution program for migrants overcrowding southern European states.) in response to the International Day of Yoga, which was established by the United Nations in 2014, the Holy Synod of the Church of Greece stated that yoga is incompatible with Christianity as it is a fundamental aspect of Hinduism and cannot be considered as just a "form of exercise", also stating that it respects the freedom of religious belief but has a responsibility to avoid developing a "climate of religious syncretism"; in a letter to Justice Minister Nikos Paraskevopoulos, Abp. Ieronymos II of Athens slammed cohabitation agreements which grant couples living together similar rights to those who are married, describing the pact as "a poor imitation" of marriage; (Note: As for the bill that foresees extending the cohabitation pact to include same-sex couples, Ieronymos also asked whether the state was planning to pave the way for provisions for "the homosexual family.") a Muslim cleric from Ankara recited a passage from the Koran in the Hagia Sophia for the first time in 85 years; the Patriarchate of Antioch broke communion with the Patriarchate of Jerusalem over the non-resolution of the jurisdictional dispute over Qatar (Résolution no. 5-3/2015); in 2015 WikiLeaks released "The Saudi Cables", including an alleged cable from the Saudi embassy in Jordan stating that in 2011 Abp. Atallah Hanna contacted them with a request for money and they agreed to give him $200,000; (Note: Abp. Atallah Hanna subsequently responded to this document, categorically stating that he never requested or received Saudi funding and that this document may be due to financial fraud on the part of someone at the embassy. Yet he is known as an adamant Arabist who stresses an Arabocentric Palestinian identity and promotes the Arabization of the Greek Orthodox Patriarchate of Jerusalem over its historic Rûm identity.) new English edition of Protopresbyter George Metallinos' 1992 Greek publication Unia: The Face and the Disguise; (Note: "Thus, Unia should not be regarded as a jurisdictional difference and a mere anti-canonical intervention in the Orthodox East by the Vatican. It is the instrument of a secular – political authority, which is focused on expansionism and increasing its influence. As for today's coincidence, which has united ALL the Orthodox in the confronting of the Papist advance with Unia as its vehicle, it is a true, God-sent opportunity to re-examine the problem of the essence (of the ecclesiasticity, that is) of the «Latin Church»-Vatican, so that the theological Dialogue (if the Vatican continues to desire it) might be evaluated anew.") Greek-Russian businessman and politician Ivan Savvidis offers to build a new mosque in Trabzon and hand it to the city's municipality in return for making the Hagia Sophia in Trabzon a church once again; Synaxis of Hierarchs of the Ecumenical Throne in Istanbul from 29 August to 2 September, including 140 bishops and archbishops from churches in Europe, the United States and Asia, celebrating the Indiction (Church's New Year) and exchanging ideas on a wide range of issues from a Pan-Orthodox Synod, to environmental issues, to interfaith dialogue and other social issues; Abp. Ieronymos II of Athens and All Greece accused Europe and the Greek government of trying to alter Christian Greek society and the identity of Greek people; (Note: "The recent incident regarding religious education classes is the tip of the iceberg, I’m afraid. It seems that our European friends — taking advantage of our dire economic situation and in light of changing the economic relations between us — will seek by all means to alter Greek society starting with our schools," Ieronymos said, addressing the Annual Conference of the Holy Synod. "The tragic thing is that our enemies are no longer far away. They are inside our walls. We can see it," he said. The Archbishop referred to the reforms required by Greece’s creditors as part of the bailout agreement. He said that the Greek government has committed to a series of reforms and measures that are imposed by international creditors in order to "devalue Greek history and our traditions, tear down the institution of family, enforce perverted ideas, further degrade our language and show obvious contempt for centuries of our great civilization, our homeland, our faith.") on a formal visit to Lambeth Palace from 2–4 November, Ec. Patr. Bartholomew and the Abp. of Canterbury Justin Welby marked the publication of a new agreed Common Statement, 'In the Image and Likeness of God: A Hope-Filled Anthropology' , the culmination of six years of study on "what Anglicans and Orthodox can say together about the meaning of human personhood in the divine image"; (Note: The new agreed Common Statement was presented by the chairmen of the International Commission for Anglican-Orthodox Theological Dialogue, Metr. Kallistos of Diocleia and the Abp. of Perth, Western Australia Roger Herft. ICAOTD members said that the agreement will form the basis for future discussions and ongoing study in areas such as bioethics and the sanctity of life, as well as human rights and ecological justice.) the Prime Minister of Greece Alexis Tsipras visited the Patriarchate of Jerusalem, praising the contribution of the Patriarchate to interreligious dialogue and being awarded the Grand Cross of the Order of the Holy Sepulchre (Greek: Μεγαλόσταυρος του Τάγματος των Ιπποτών του Παναγίου Τάφου) by Patriarch Theophilos III; the Greek parliament legislated a cohabitation agreement for same-sex couples, with a parliamentary majority of 193 MPs in favor, 56 MPs against and 51 absent; commenting on the recent Anti-Racism Law and on the recognition of same-sex unions in Greece, various Greek Orthodox Hierarchs warned that the time of persecutions has arrived in Orthodox Greece; (Note: Various hierarchs made statements in reference to the recent Anti-Racism Law and the recognition of same-sex unions in Greece: Metropolitan Ignatios of Larisa and Tyrnavos: "Sin is being officially legalized in our country... Homosexuality is an abominable sin which leads people to inevitable spiritual death... The politicians are following the stench coming from the "civilized" countries which before us recognized that black is white, that bitter is sweet, and that unlawful is lawful... Thus, "Let us attend". "Let us lift up our hearts". This is Orthodox Greece. This is our treasure. They envy us and intend to take this treasure from us. Let us not fall into this trap! Let us not be traitors!"; Metropolitan Pavlos of Sisanion and Siatista: "Perhaps it is time to close our doors before those 'politicians', who visit us allegedly for respect, but in reality for populist purposes? Does someone sincerely believe that the Church can betray its eternal values and adapt itself to the momentary needs of each historical epoch? The undeniable right of the Church is to bear witness to the truth. And homosexuality is inconsistent with Church life. Gentlemen of the government! Perhaps tomorrow you are going to demand that the Church accepts bestiality and pedophilia? Some expect that as soon as 'the Free Cohabitation Law' is adopted, you will be forced to legalize pedophilia. Europe will put pressure upon you. And you are ready to do anything. Do you really think that we will ever agree with this?"; Metropolitan Seraphim of Piraeus: "Adoption of the new law is officially opening the page of state persecutions against our faith. The politicians shamelessly refer to the European consensus concerning legalization of sodomy, but they conceal the fact that post-Christian Europe has become Sodom and Gomorrah. The persecutions are approaching. We will be threatened, we will be reviled, we will probably be imprisoned and murdered. But we must remain faithful even unto death. We ought to obey God rather than men (Acts 5:29), remembering that In the world ye shall have tribulation (Jn 16:33), because the world hateth you, for the Lord has chosen you out of the world (Jn 15:18–19). And we should not forget the words: And fear not them which kill the body, but are not able to kill the soul (Mt 10:28). On behalf of the Holy Metropolis of Piraeus we officially announce to all the politicians who will vote for legalization of the moral insanity, that all contact with them will be stopped.") the UNHCR reported that 851,319 refugees and migrants arrived in Greece in 2015 as a gateway to the Schengen Area; the Greek Orthodox Patriarchate of Jerusalem, with the agreement of two other major communities (Roman Catholic and Armenian Apostolic Churches), invited the National Technical University of Athens (which had previously led restoration projects on the Athenian Acropolis and the Hagia Sophia) to restore the Aedicule of the Church of the Holy Sepulchre in March 2016, with work to be completed by the spring of 2017. (Note: Chief Scientific Supervisor Professor Antonia Moropoulou directed the team of scientists from the National Technical University of Athens on the project to restore the Aedicule of the Church of the Holy Sepulchre.)
- 2016 The Church of Jerusalem canonized Venerable John the Chosebite / John Jacob of Neamţ (†1960); (Note: In 1968 and 1970, St John’s book Spiritual Nourishment was published in two volumes, with the blessing of Patriarch Benedict of Jerusalem. St John Jacob was glorified by the Romanian Orthodox Church in 1992. The Greek Orthodox Patriarchate of Jerusalem placed his feast day on 28 July, the date of the translation of his holy relics.: See also: (in Romanian) Sfântul Ioan Iacob Românul de la Hozeva. Wikipedia (Romanian Wikipedia).)
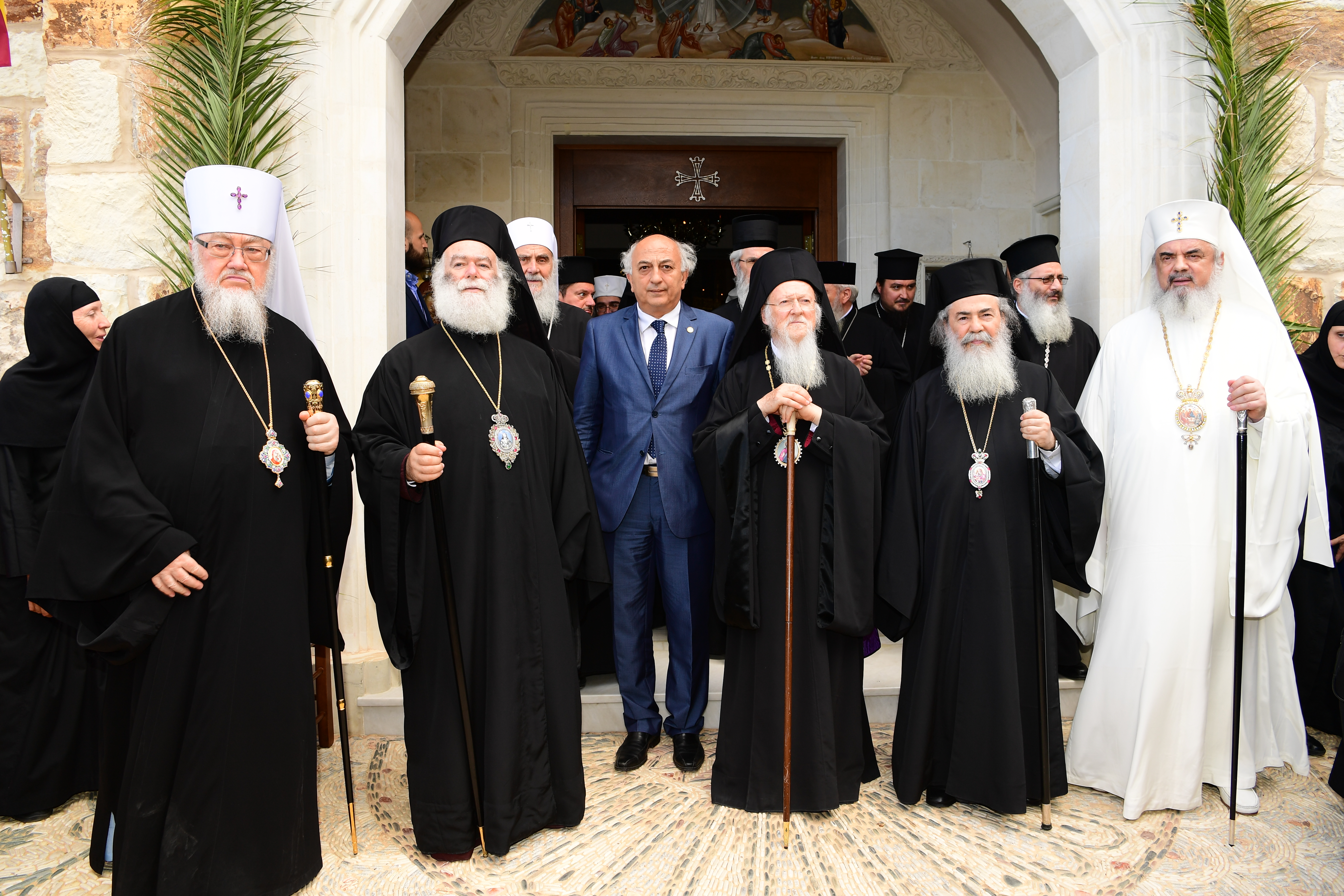
  Hierarchs at the Pan-Orthodox Council in Crete: Sawa (Hrycuniak) of Poland; Theodore II (Choreftakis) of Africa; Serbian Patriarch Irinej (Gavrilović); Minister Ioannis Amanatidis; Bartholomew (Archontonis) of Constantinople; Theophilos (Giannopoulos) III of Jerusalem; Daniel (Ciobotea) of Romania.
  Russian President Vladimir Putin visited Mount Athos alongside Patriarch Kirill, in order to mark the 1,000-year presence of Russian Orthodox monks in Greece; (Note: In addressing representatives of the Holy Kinot, Athos' high governing council, Putin noted that Russia’s ties with Holy Mount Athos and Greece in general will continue to strengthen: "I am confident that relations between Russia and the Holy Mount Athos, and Greece as a whole, will only strengthen, while the spiritual relationship and trust will continue to determine the nature of our traditionally close and friendly relations," Putin said.; Russia and Greece celebrated 2016 as a cross-cultural year, marking the millennial anniversary since the first Russian settlement on the Holy Mount Athos.) Patriarch Kirill consecrated the restored cathedral of the Old Russikon skete of the Great-Martyr Panteleimon, on Holy Mount Athos on 28 May; the Turkish government stated it would permit the use of the Hagia Sophia basilica for Islamic Ramadan prayers throughout the month, a move that Greek officials decried as "retrograde" and disrespectful; in a letter to the Greek Secretary-General for Transparency and Human Rights, over 50 organisations, including the National Secular Society (NSS), urged the Ministry of Justice to abolish Greek blasphemy laws and "drop all related charges pending" before Greek courts; (Note: "The Greek Penal Code currently states that "One who publicly and maliciously and by any means blasphemes God shall be punished by imprisonment for not more than two years". It also punishes anyone who "displays publicly with blasphemy a lack of respect for things divine". This 'crime' can be punished by a prison term up to 3 months in length... ...The signatories to the letter told the Greek Ministry of Justice:..."We now urge you to see to it that the government promptly tables before Parliament the abolition of the two blasphemy articles 198 and 199 from Greece's Criminal Code and that prosecutors or courts drop all related charges pending before them," the letter said.") Holy and Great Council of the Orthodox Church is held in Kolymvari, Crete, from 17–27 June, with 10 out of 14 autocephalous Churches in attendance, agreeing on six official documents; the XXIII Conference of the Inter-Parliamentary Assembly on Orthodoxy (I.A.O.) met in Thessaloniki; (Note: The Interparliamentary Assembly on Orthodoxy (I.A.O.) is an interparliamentary body, set up upon the initiative of the Hellenic Parliament. It is the only international organization that brings together the legislative bodies of Orthodox countries. The assembly’s July 2016 meeting took place one week after the closing of the Council of Crete. On the agenda were issues related to the Crete council’s activities and related illegitimate attempts to establish control over all local churches. Attention was also paid to the fight against the modern hedonistic ideology of the West, and on assistance to Christians in the Middle East suffering from persecution.) over 60 Athonite Fathers wrote an "open letter" to the Holy Community of Mt. Athos calling for an immediate convocation of the governing body of Athos to formally condemn the Council in Crete, stating their intention to cease commemorating the Patriarch of Constantinople due to his leadership in the "false council" at which the pan-heresy of ecumenism was supported; (Note: At their head was Elder Gabriel of the Kelli of St. Christodoulos (Holy Monastery of Koutloumousiou), a disciple of Saint Paisios. The Athonite Fathers briefly listed 12 points of divergence of the Cretan Council from Orthodox Tradition and Faith. They also stated that 100 years of extreme oikonomia and tolerance of the ecumenist, latinizing, unionist Patriarchs and bishops has brought about a terrible erosion of faith and fed heretical deviations.) ecclesiastical delegation from Church of Greece met the Patriarch and Hierarchs of Church of Georgia from 25–28 July, to express – on behalf of all faithful Orthodox Christians in Greece – their heartfelt gratitude to the Patriarch, Hierarchy and Faithful of the Venerable and Martyric Church of Georgia for their confession of the Orthodox Faith over and against the rise – in council – of syncretistic ecumenism, and to discuss the proper response to the unorthodox "Council of Crete"; (Note: The delegation consisted of: Archpriest and Professor Emeritus of Patrology of the Theological School of the University of Thessaloniki, Fr. Theodore Zisis; Professor of Dogmatic Theology in the Department of Theology of the Theological School of the University of Thessaloniki, Demetrios Tselengidis; Protopresbyter and Rector of the Parish of St. Nicholas of the Diocese of Patra, Fr. Anastasios Gotsopoulos; Protopresbyter and Rector of the Parish of the Prophet Elias, Petrokerasa, in the Diocese of Ierissou and Agion Oros, Fr. Peter Heers; Protopresbyter and Rector of the Parish of All-Holy Directress, Bokos Hill, in the Diocese of Peiraeus, Fr. Matthew Vulcanescu.) a public consultation process for Constitutional Revision was launched by Greek Prime Minister Alexis Tsipras, including a proposed a "neutrality of the State" but with preservation of the recognition of the Christian Orthodox faith as "prevailing religion, for historical and practical reasons"; a group of protesters said to be anarchists burst into and disrupted the Divine Liturgy at the Greek Orthodox Church of Gregory Palamas in Thessaloniki; repose of Schema-Archimandrite Jeremiah (Alekhin), (Note: See: (in Russian) Иеремия (Алёхин). Википедии. (Russian Wikipedia).) hegumen of the Russian Monastery of St Panteleimon on Mt Athos, aged 100, the oldest hegumen on the Holy Mountain; amid growing tension between the Church of Greece and the government over changes to the way religion is taught at schools, Abp. Ieronymos stated that "Greece and Orthodoxy are not for sale"; (Note: Archbishop Ieronymos said that there are "some who do not love their country and want to de-Hellenize it, and some who don’t love the Church and want to de-Christianize it.") in a lengthy presentation to the hierarchy of the Church of Greece, Abp. Ieronymos dismissed calls for the separation of church and state as outdated remnants of the previous century, targeting left-wing ideology that is shrouded in a progressive guise as the driving force behind the move for the separation, while noting that the people will decide whether such a separation can take place; (Note: "'The parties of the Left with their known communist worldview – as experienced before the collapse of socialism in the eastern bloc, when in essence religious faith was persecuted – are driven by failed atheistic ideologies and meet with the neoliberal parties under the directives of the new era and the new order. The talk of Church-State separation is supposedly a progressive slogan. These perceptions, however, belong to the previous century, born under a bigoted, anti-religious and anti-church populist spirit that is incompatible with today’s beliefs about the state and religion,' the Archbishop said.") Archimandite Athanasios Athanasios, Proigoumenos of the Holy Monastery of the Great Meteora wrote " The 'Council' of Crete, The Chronicle of a Premeditated Deviation ", a historical account and spiritual analysis demonstrating that the results of the 'Council' of Crete were pre-determined and pre-fabricated; according to a Pro rata survey for the Efimerida ton Syntakton newspaper, 46 of respondents were against severing state-church ties, while 38 percent were in favor of maintaining the existing status between the two institutions; Patr. Bartholomew I of Constantinople writes letter to Abp. Ieronymos II of Athens, demanding the defrocking and severing of communion with those opposed to the Pan-Orthodox Council in Crete; in his Patriarchal Proclamation of Christmas 2016, Ec. Patr. Bartholomew declared 2017 as the Year of Protection of the Sacredness of Childhood, inviting everyone to recognize and respect the rights and integrity of children; official figures provided by the Church of Greece show a total of 9,792 parish and monastery churches. (Note: According to the General Secretariat of Religious Affairs report, there are 9,146 parish churches and 646 monastery churches. They fall within the jurisdiction of the 82 Dioceses of the Church of Greece, of 9 Dioceses of the Church of Crete, 5 Dioceses of the Ecclesiastical Provinces of Dodecanese and the Patriarchal Exarchate of Patmos… …The report also says that there are numerous Christian churches preserved from the Byzantine period (330–1453), many of them built on top of ancient Greek temples and shrines, in order to purify each area from its pagan past… …Overall, there are 350 Christian places of worship which constitute cultural monuments and they are protected as such.)
- 2017 First Russian church is opened in Cyprus, in the village of Episkopeio (Archdiocese of Tamassos and Oreini), dedicated to St Andrew the First-Called and All the Saints Who Shone Forth in the Russian Land; St. Anthony's Greek Orthodox Monastery in Arizona published The Departure of the Soul According to the Teaching of the Orthodox Church, the first comprehensive presentation of the teachings of over 120 Orthodox Saints and dozens of holy hierarchs, clergy, and theologians on the subject of the soul's exodus to the next life; the Greek State recognized Paganism (Hellenic Religion) as a religion, through a decision of the Greek Ministry of Education, Research and Religious Affairs, defined as a 'Known Religion' according to paragraph 17 – the only form of recognition for a religion in Greece; Metr. Seraphim of Piraeus wrote a 37-page letter to Turkish President Recep Tayyip Erdoğan urging him to convert to Greek Orthodox Christianity and be baptised in the Ecumenical Patriarchate of Constantinople, also suggesting that Russian President Vladimir Putin be his godfather. the Patriarchs and Heads of the Christian Churches in Jerusalem criticized what they see as a breach of the status quo in the capital, claiming there is a "systematic attempt to undermine the integrity of the Holy City of Jerusalem and the Holy Land, and to weaken the Christian presence"; (Note: "The judgement in the "Jaffa Gate" case against the Greek Orthodox Patriarchate of Jerusalem, which we regard as unjust, as well as a proposed bill in the Knesset which is politically motivated that would restrict the rights of the Churches over our own property, are further assaults on the rights that the Status Quo has always guaranteed." The statement was signed by The Patriarchs and Heads of Churches in Jerusalem as follows: Patr. Theophilos III, Greek Orthodox Patriarchate; Patr. Nourhan Manougian, Armenian Apostolic Orthodox Patriarchate; Abp. Pierbattista Pizzaballa, Apostolic Administrator, Latin Patriarchate; Fr. Francesco Patton, ofm, Custos of the Holy Land; Abp. Anba Antonious, Coptic Orthodox Patriarchate, Jerusalem; Abp. Swerios Malki Murad, Syrian Orthodox Patriarchate; Abp. Aba Embakob, Ethiopian Orthodox Patriarchate; Abp. Joseph-Jules Zerey, Greek-Melkite-Catholic Patriarchate; Abp. Mosa El-Hage, Maronite Patriarchal Exarchate; Abp. Suheil Dawani, Episcopal Church of Jerusalem and the Middle East; Bp. Munib Younan, Evangelical Lutheran Church in Jordan and the Holy Land; Bp. Pierre Malki, Syrian Catholic Patriarchal Exarchate; Msgr. Georges Dankaye’, Armenian Catholic Patriarchal Exarchate.) Patr. Theophilos III of Jerusalem visited Pope Francis of Rome at the Vatican, raising two recent issues of all the Christian Churches of the Holy Land, namely: the proposed bill by 40 Members of the Knesset which, if passed into law, would deny the rights of the Churches to freely deal with their land properties, as well as the recent decision of the Israeli District Court in Jerusalem, which gave effect to the unauthorised and illegitimate contracts relating to the Jaffa Gate properties that belong to the Patriarchate of Jerusalem; the Greek parliament passed a law on Tuesday 10 October to make it easier for anyone 15 years of age and older to change their legally recognized gender, a move that was denounced by Church of Greece as a threat to the social fabric; (Note: "The bill "On the Legal Recognition of Gender Identity" passed with 171 out of 300 deputies voting in favor of it, despite the fact that a recent survey showed that 71.7% of Greeks are against the possibility of minors changing their gender." Church bells were rung "in mourning" across the Greek Metropolis of Kalavryta, to protest the passing of the law making it easier for people to officially change their gender.) a particle of the relics of St. Seraphim of Sarov is brought from Diveyevo Monastery to the Greek town of Patras from 16–26 November, timed to the inter-Orthodox conference The Voice of Apostle Andrew the First-Called in Modern World held on 17–18 November; the Greek Orthodox Metropolis of Sweden and all Scandinavia established a new parish in the Norwegian city of Bergen, named after St. Chrysostomos of Smyrna, martyred in 1922; with the approval and recommendation of the Church of Greece, on 27 November the Sacred and Holy Synod of the Ecumenical Patriarchate formally glorified Archimandrite Elder Iakovos (Tsalikis) (†1991), Igumen of the Monastery of Saint David the Elder in Euboea. (Note: The feast day of Venerable Iakovos (Tsalikis) of Euboea, The New Ascetic was set on 22 November each year: (in Greek) "Κατ᾿ αὐτήν, ἡ Ἁγία καί Ἱερά Σύνοδος ὁμοφώνως ἀποδεχθεῖσα εἰσήγησιν τῆς Κανονικῆς Ἐπιτροπῆς ἀνέγραψεν εἰς τό Ἁγιολόγιον τῆς Ὀρθοδόξου Ἐκκλησίας τόν μακαριστόν Ἀρχιμανδρίτην Ἰάκωβον Τσαλίκην, ἐκ Λιβισίου Μικρᾶς Ἀσίας, Ἡγούμενον τῆς ἐν Β. Εὐβοίᾳ Ἱερᾶς Μονῆς Ὁσίου Δαυΐβ τοῦ Γέροντος, τῆς μνήμης αὐτοῦ ὁρισθείσης διά τήν 22αν Νοεμβρίου ἑκάστου ἔτους.")

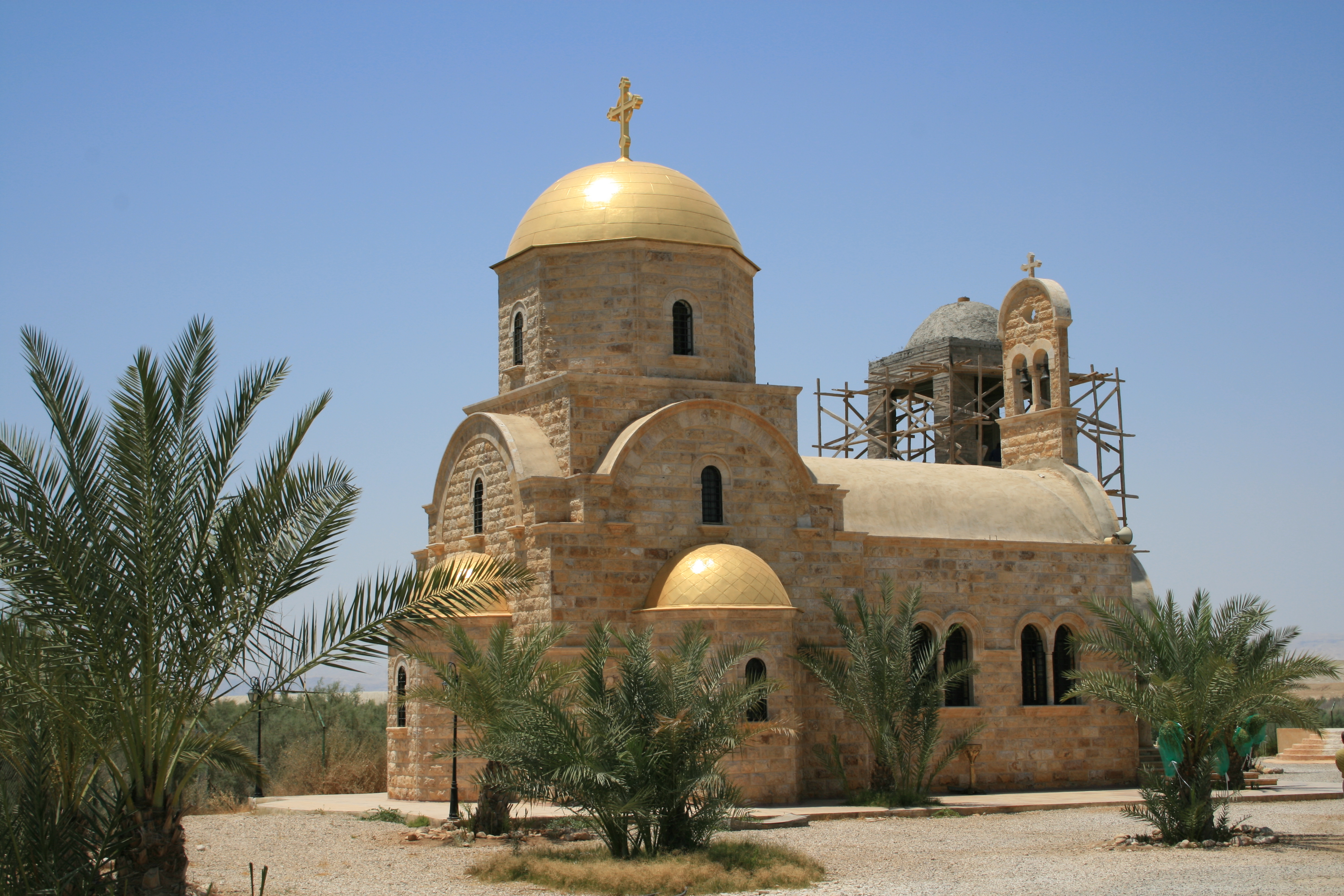
The newly built Greek Orthodox Church of John the Baptist, at the Baptism Site of Christ.

- 2018 The historic Monastery of St. John the Baptist in the Bethabara area, east of Jericho, on the west bank of the river Jordan, is reopened as an Orthodox Shrine of the Jerusalem Patriarchate on Monday 29 January; (Note: "According to the tradition of the Gospel and the Church, this area is thought to have been the exact baptism site of our Lord Jesus Christ by St. John the Forerunner and Baptist, as well as the crossing point of the river Jordan by the Israelites when they were led by Joshua and saved from their enemies. It is also believed that the cave where St. John the Baptist lived was preserved nearby during the first Christian years.") death of French Archimandrite Placide Deseille (fr), a well-known Orthodox patrologist and theologian and the founder and hegumen of two Athonite monasteries in France that are metochia of Simonopetra on Mt. Athos; (Note: In 1978 the Orthodox Monastère Orthodoxe Saint-Antoine-le-Grand (ru) was founded in Saint-Laurent-en-Royans in southeastern France, with the blessing of Metr. Meletios (Karabinis) of France and Schema-Archimadrite Aimilianos (Vafeidis) of Simonopetra Monastery. And in 1991 the Monastère de Solan (fr) was founded in La Bastide-d'Engras in southern France.) first Orthodox monastery is opened in South Africa, the Monastery of Sts. Nicholas the Wonderworker, Nektarios of Aegina, and Paisios the Athonite, near Hartbeespoort, 40 miles north of Johannesburg; on 17 February, hundreds of Christians rallied peacefully in support of the Greek Orthodox Patriarchate of Jerusalem and the other Jerusalem Churches against tax measures (Arnona) imposed by the Israeli Jerusalem Municipality on the Holy Churches and their adjacent buildings; on 25 February, the Heads of Churches in charge of the Holy Sepulchre and the Status Quo governing the various Christian Holy Sites in Jerusalem – namely the Greek Orthodox Patriarchate, the Custody of the Holy Land and the Armenian Patriarchate – took the unprecedented step of the closure of the Church of the Holy Sepulchre as a measure of protest against the Jerusalem Municipality’s "discriminatory and racist" pursuing of 650 million shekels (over $186 million) in church taxes, against centuries of precedent, slammed also by Palestine, Jordan and Lebanon, as Israeli tax and land grab plans targeting churches in Jerusalem in violation of international regulations; (Note: A few days later, on 27 February 2018, the Church of the Holy Sepulchre was re-opened after an intervention by Israeli prime minister Benjamin Netanyahu, who announced in a statement that it was suspending the tax collection and freezing the legislation until a newly formed committee — to be headed by Regional Cooperation Minister Tzachi Hanegbi — could resolve the issues with the churches. The Church leaders in charge of the Holy Sepulchre — Theophilos III, Francesco Patton and Nourhan Manougian — issued a statement to "give thanks to God" for the statement released by the government of Israel and offer gratitude to all those who have worked tirelessly to uphold the Christian presence in Jerusalem and to defend the 'Status Quo' .) the Ecumenical Patriarchate declared that the actions of the Bulgarian Orthodox Church regarding the schismatic and unrecognized Macedonian Orthodox Church to be un-canonical, also seriously criticized by the Serbian Orthodox Church and Church of Greece; (Note: An unnamed hierarch of the Patriarchate of Constantinople told the Romfea news agency, "Unfortunately, the Bulgarians show that they have no Church consciousness". The Archbishopric of Ohrid, headed by Archbishop Jovan (Vraniskovski) is the legitimate canonical Church in Macedonia, and this is acknowledged even by the European Court of Human Rights. Russian Foreign Minister Sergey Lavrov also warned against involving Orthodox Churches in political games, stating "we all see how attempts are being made to involve Churches in political games in Ukraine, in Montenegro, or in Macedonia," he said.) the Office of Heresies and Para-Religions of the Metropolis of Piraeus issued a letter admonishing ecumenical circles for an orchestrated plot and persecution against Elder Ephraim of Arizona and monastic elders who are battling ecumenism; the glorification of Elder Iakovos (Tsalikis) of Euboea was liturgically celebrated on Sunday 3 June 2018, at St. David Monastery, headed by His All-Holiness Ecumenical Patriarch Bartholomew, with the concelebration of 30 Orthodox bishops from the Greek and Cypriot Churches and the Ecumenical Patriarchate; African King Tchiffi Zie Jean Gervais of Côte d'Ivoire, Permanent Secretary General of the 'Forum of Kings, Princes, Sheiks and Traditional Leaders of Africa', is received into the Orthodox Church on Mt. Athos, baptized by Hieromonk Dionysius of Koutloumousiou Monastery with the Christian name of David; the Holy Synod of the Church of Greece declared St. Therapont of Cyprus (May 14) and St. Gregory the Theologian (Jan. 25) as patron saints in the medical field. (Note: The Synod approved the request of the Panhellenic Physiotherapists’ Association to take the Hieromartyr St. Therapont of Cyprus as its patron; and the request of the Hellenic Society of Rheumatology to take St. Gregory the Theologian as its patron saint.) members of the Ukrainian Orthodox Church's Synod met with Patriarch Bartholomew of Constantinople, concerning ‘the impossibility of legalizing the schism’ in Ukraine and also to the need to heal it; (Note: The hierarchs who took part in the consultation adopted a joint statement which reads in particular, "The Patriarchate of Constantinople refuted the information that the canonical mechanism of overcoming the schism in the Ukrainian Orthodoxy had already been agreed upon and the text of the Tomos of Autocephaly of the Ukrainian Church had been drafted. It also proved to be wrong that the unilateral granting of autocephaly to the Ukrainian Church could take place in the nearest future or within some fixed period." Noted in the document is the readiness of the Patriarchate of Constantinople "to join the process of overcoming the Ukrainian church schism in consultation with the fraternal Local Orthodox Churches.") 25th annual Interparliamentary Assembly on Orthodoxy (IAO) took place at the Byzantine & Christian Museum in Athens; 500th anniversary since St. Maxim the Greek of Vatopedi Monastery arrived in Russia marked on Mount Athos; glorification of Elder Amphilochios (Makris) of Patmos (†1970); (Note: He was glorified by the Holy Synod of the Ecumenical Patriarchate of Constantinople on 29 August 2018: (in Greek) α) Εἰσηγήσει τῆς Κανονικῆς Ἐπιτροπῆς συμπεριελήφθη εἰς τό Ἁγιολόγιον τῆς Ὀρθοδόξου Ἐκκλησίας ὁ ἐν Πάτμῳ ἀσκήσας καί ἀναπτύξας μέγα πνευματικόν καί κοινωφελές ἔργον ἐν Δωδεκανήσῳ, Κρήτῃ καί ἀλλαχοῦ Ἀρχιμανδρίτης Ἀμφιλόχιος Μακρῆς, διατελέσας Ἡγούμενος τῆς ἱστορικῆς Ἱερᾶς Μονῆς Ἁγίου Ἰωάννου τοῦ Θεολόγου καί Πατριαρχικός Ἔξαρχος Πάτμου, ὅστις καί ἵδρυσε τήν ἐν τῇ Νήσῳ γυναικείαν Ἱεράν Μονήν Εὐαγγελισμοῦ Μητρός Ἠγαπημένου.) Synaxis of the Hierarchy of the Ecumenical Throne meets in Constantinople, 1–3 September; Abp. Ieronymos II told a meeting of the Holy Synod in Athens that he feared the Greek state was rudderless after nearly a decade of wrenching economic crisis, a rising crime rate, crippled health and justice systems, inadequate welfare and what he called a lack of direction in foreign policy, and that the Orthodox church and its teachings are in danger of being forgotten in an increasingly secularized and crisis-ridden society; the Synod of Bishops of the Russian Orthodox Church, at its session on 15 October 2018, in Minsk, severed Eucharistic communion with the Ecumenical Patriarchate of Constantinople, following the decisions of the Patriarchate of Constantinople 'to grant autocephaly to the Ukrainian Church'; (Note: "'From now on till the Patriarchate of Constantinople abandons its anti-canonical decisions, it is impossible for all the clergy of the Russian Orthodox Church to concelebrate with the clergy of the Church of Constantinople, and for the laity to participate in sacraments administered in its churches', the document states.") (Note: Other Synods of Bishops expressed their complete support of the position taken by the Patriarchate of Moscow: the Synod of Bishops of the Russian Orthodox Church Outside of Russia (ROCOR) at its session on 18 October 2018, in New York, severed Eucharistic intercommunion with the Church of Constantinople, "until this ancient and once-glorious sister Church repents from its introduction of false and alien teachings about primacy and universal authority, contrary to the ancient Orthodox Faith, and ceases from its lawless actions"; the Council of Bishops of the Ukrainian Orthodox Church (MP) at its session on 13 November 2018, in the Holy Dormition Kyiv Pechersk Lavra, resolved that "the Eucharistic communion between the Ukrainian Orthodox Church and the Patriarchate of Constantinople is currently impossible and is broken off"; the Holy Council of Bishops of the Serbian Orthodox Church at its session of 6–7 November 2018 resolved that the "decision of the Synod of Constantinople [is] non-binding for the Serbian Orthodox Church", and that "the Assembly does not recognize the mentioned individuals Filaret Denysenko and Makary Maletich} nor their followers as Orthodox bishops or clergy and, consequently, does not accept liturgical and canonical union with them or their supporters."; the Council of Bishops of the Polish Autocephalous Orthodox Church in an official statement on 15 November 2018, "forbade the priests of the Polish Orthodox Church from having liturgical and prayerful contact with the 'clergy' of the so-called Kyiv Patriarchate and the so-called 'Autocephalous Orthodox Church,' which have committed much evil in the past"; (Note: (in Polish) "II. Święty Sobór Biskupów zabrania duchownym Polskiego Autokefalicznego Kościoła Prawosławnego wchodzenia w liturgiczno – modlitewne kontakty z „duchownymi" tzw. „Patriarchatu Kijowskiego" i tzw. „Autokefalicznej Cerkwi", które w dotychczasowych działaniach uczyniły wiele zła"."); the Synod of Bishops of the Orthodox Church in America (OCA) at its Fall Session held on 23–25 October 2018, determined "to continue to recognize and support Metropolitan Onufry as the canonical head and Primate of the Ukrainian Orthodox Church" and "to withhold, with several of our sister Churches, recognition of the Orthodox Church of Ukraine."; an extraordinary session of the Synod of the Church of Cyprus on 18 February 2019 issued a statement neither explicitly condemning the Orthodox Church of Ukraine (OCU), nor recognizing it, also expecting the Patriarchate of Constantinople to hold a pan-Orthodox council or a Synaxis of the Primates to handle the issue.) Greece ranked first in Europe in a list by Jo Di Graphics measuring the number of priests per 100,000 people, with about 88 priests per 100,000 people in Greece, followed by Italy in second with 82.8, and Romania in third with 80.1; Greek Prime Minister Alex Tsipras announced plans to disestablish the Church of Greece, intending to amend the Constitution of Greece to remove references to the church and define the Greek state as 'religiously neutral', opposed by many hierarchs, clergy, and faithful of the Greek Orthodox Church. (Note: Metropolitan Seraphim of Piraeus remarked that "this agreement is a way of marginalizing the Church. Mathematically, the Church will lose its status as a legal person governed by public law and become a private matter – this is the aim. This is the privatization of the Church.") (Note: "In the modern era, disestablishments have taken place in Switzerland in 1948, Portugal in 1976, Spain in 1978, Paraguay in 1992, Sweden in 2000, and Bolivia in 2009. In 2017, the Church of Norway lost some of the trappings of establishment, while retaining direct funding by the state.") on 27 November 2018 the Synod of the Ecumenical Patriarchate decided to dissolve the Patriarchal Exarchate for Orthodox Parishes of the Russian Tradition in Western Europe, by repealing the Patriarchal Tomos of 1999, without consulting the ruling hierarch Archbishop John (Renneteau) of Chariopoulis.
- 2019 Metr. Tikhon of the Orthodox Church in America (O.C.A) joined Ecumenical Patriarch Bartholomew on his annual pilgrimage to Cappadocia, concelebrating the Divine Liturgy on the Sunday of All Saints; the holy synod of the Church of Greece establishes "Unborn Child" Day via circular number 5721/2018, to be celebrated on the Sunday after the feast of the Nativity, to protect children and to help solve the country’s demographic problem; death of Elder Ephraim of Philotheou and Arizona; (Note: He reposed on Saturday 7 December 2019 at about 9:00pm or 10:00pm (MST) at St. Anthony’s Monastery in Florence, which he founded in 1995. Archbishop Elpidophoros of America co-officiated at the funeral service for Elder Ephraim on 11 December, along with Metropolitans Alexios of Atlanta, Gerasimos of San Francisco and Isaiah of Denver. The Abbot of the Monastery of Philotheou, Elder Nikodimos, and several other Athonite fathers were also in attendance.) Greek Orthodox Byzantine chant is added to Unesco's Representative List of Intangible Cultural Heritage of Humanity. (Note: "As a living art that has existed for more than 2000 years, the Byzantine chant is a significant cultural tradition and comprehensive music system forming part of the common musical traditions that developed in the Byzantine Empire. Highlighting and musically enhancing the liturgical texts of the Greek Orthodox Church, it is inextricably linked with spiritual life and religious worship. This vocal art is mainly focused on rendering the ecclesiastical text; arguably, the chant exists because of the word (‘logos’), since every aspect of the tradition serves to spread the sacred message. Passed on aurally across the generations, its main characteristics have remained over the centuries: it is exclusively vocal music; it is essentially monophonic; the chants are codified into an eight-mode or eight-tone system; and the chant employs different styles of rhythm to accentuate the desired syllables of specific words.")
- 2020 The Holy Synod of the Church of Greece expressed the Church’s position on voluntary abortion as constituting murder; (Note: (in Greek) "Η Ιερά Σύνοδος λαβούσα υπ’ όψη της τα εσχάτως ανακύψαντα επί του θέματος των εκτρώσεων και βασιζομένη επί της αγίας Γραφής και της Ιεράς Παραδόσεως της Ορθοδόξου Εκκλησίας του Χριστού εκφράζει την θεολογικήν αυτής θέσιν περί του εμβρύου ως πλήρους και ακεραίου ανθρώπου από της στιγμής της συλλήψεώς του γι’ αυτό και θεωρεί την εκουσία έκτρωση ως φόνο και δεν την αποδέχεται.") taking into account the suggestions of the Synodal Committee on Heresies, the Holy Synod of the Church of Greece issued a statement condemning Yoga as "a fundamental chapter of the religion of Hinduism" that is "absolutely incompatible with the Orthodox Christian faith and has no place in the lives of Christians", (Note: (in Greek) "α) Εξ αφορμής της συστάσεως υπό διαφόρων φορέων και μέσων μαζικής ενημερώσεως, «της τεχνικής της Γιόγκα» ως τρόπου αντιμετωπίσεως του άγχους, κατά την περίοδο της πανδημίας του Covid-19, λαβούσα υπ’ όψιν το από 16ης Ιουνίου 2015 Δελτίο Τύπου της Ιεράς Συνόδου της Εκκλησίας της Ελλάδος, περί «της τεχνικής της Γιόγκα» και στο πλαίσιο του σεβασμού της θρησκευτικής ελευθερίας, η οποία στη Χώρα μας είναι συνταγματικώς κατωχυρωμένη και σεβαστή, αλλά και της ποιμαντικής ευθύνης Αυτής για την αποφυγή δημιουργίας κλίματος θρησκευτικού συγκρητισμού, ομοφώνως απεφάσισε να υπενθυμίσει στο χριστεπώνυμο Πλήρωμα ότι η «Γιόγκα» αποτελεί θεμελιώδες κεφάλαιο της θρησκείας του Ινδουϊσμού, διαθέτει ποικιλομορφία σχολών, κλάδων, εφαρμογών και τάσεων και δεν αποτελεί «είδος γυμναστικής».") and also urging all bishops and clergy to refrain from any event organized by the Rotary and the Lions organizations, whose activities are not limited to social events, but also extend to religious acts. (Note: (in Greek) "γ) Απεφάσισε να συστήσει δι’ Εγκυκλίου Σημειώματος στους Σεβ. Μητροπολίτες και τον Ιερό Κλήρο της Εκκλησίας της Ελλάδος να απέχουν από κάθε εκδήλωση που διοργανώνεται από τις οργανώσεις Rotary και Lions, επειδή δεν περιορίζονται μόνον σε κοινωνικές εκδηλώσεις, αλλά επεκτείνονται και σε πράξεις θρησκευτικού χαρακτήρα, καθ’ όσον διαθέτουν τυπικό τελετουργίας εισδοχής νέων μελών και καθορίζουν προσευχή που απευθύνεται αδογμάτιστα σε ένα θεό, με την γενική έννοια του όρου και όχι κατά την Ορθόδοξη Χριστιανική Πίστη μας.")

== See also ==
- Eastern Orthodoxy in Greece
- List of archbishops of Athens
- Greek Orthodox Church
- Eastern Orthodox Church organization

History

- History of the Eastern Orthodox Church
- History of Eastern Christianity
- History of the Eastern Orthodox Church under the Ottoman Empire
- History of Eastern Orthodox Churches in the 20th century
- Timeline of Eastern Orthodoxy in America

Church Fathers

- Apostolic Fathers
- Church Fathers
- Ante-Nicene Fathers (book)
- Desert Fathers
- Nicene and Post-Nicene Fathers
- List of Church Fathers

== Bibliography ==
- Giannēs Koliopoulos and Thanos Veremēs. Greece: The Modern Sequel, from 1831 to the Present. NYU Press, 2002. 407 pp. ISBN 9780814747674
- Anastasios Anastassiadis. Religion and Politics in Greece: The Greek Church's 'Conservative Modernization' in the 1990s. Research in Question, No.11, January 2004. (PDF).
- C.M. Woodhouse. Modern Greece. 4th ed. Boston : Faber and Faber, 1986.
- Charalambos K. Papastathis and Nikos Maghioros. "Greece: A Faithful Orthodox Christian State. The Orthodox Church in the Hellenic Republiic". In: Javier Martínez-Torrón and W. Cole Durham, Jr.. Religion and the Secular State: National Reports (Issued for the occasion of the XVIIIth International Congress of Comparative Law, Washington, D.C., July 2010). Published by: Complutense Universidad de Madrid, in cooperation with The International Center for Law and Religion Studies, Brigham Young University. July 2014. pp. 339–375.
- Demetrios J. Constantelos. Understanding the Greek Orthodox Church: Its Faith, History and Life. 4th Edition. Brookline, Mass.: Hellenic College Press, 2005. ISBN 9780917653506
- Dimitri E. Conomos, Graham Speake. Mount Athos, the Sacred Bridge: The Spirituality of the Holy Mountain. Oxford: Peter Lang, 2005.
- Dr. Daphne Halikiopoulou. Patterns of Secularization: Church, State and Nation in Greece and the Republic of Ireland. Ashgate Publishing, Ltd., 2011. ISBN 9781409403456
- Effie Fokas. Religion in the Greek Public Sphere: Nuancing the Account. Journal of Modern Greek Studies. Volume 27, Number 2, October 2009, pp. 349–374.
- Efthymios Nicolaidis. Science and Eastern Orthodoxy: From the Greek Fathers to the Age of Globalization. Transl. Susan Emanuel. Johns Hopkins University Press. 2011. 288 pp. ISBN 978-1421402987
- Herman A. Middleton. Precious Vessels of the Holy Spirit: The Lives & Counsels of Contemporary Elders of Greece. 2nd Ed. Protecting Veil Press, 2004.
- John Hadjinicolaou (Ed.). Synaxis: An Anthology of the Most Significant Orthodox Theology in Greece Appearing in the Journal Synaxē from 1982 to 2002. Montréal : Alexander Press, 2006.
- John L. Tomkinson. Between Heaven and Earth: The Greek Church. Anagnosis Books, Athens, 2004.
- Mother Nectaria McLees. Evlogeite! A Pilgrim's Guide to Greece. 1st Ed. St. Nicholas Press, Kansas City, MO, 2002. 927 pp.
- Norman Russell. Modern Greek Theologians and the Greek Fathers. Philosophy & Theology Volume 18, Issue 1. 2007.10.17. Pages 77–92. (ISSN 0890-2461)
- Rev. Dr. Nicon D. Patrinacos (M.A., D.Phil. (Oxon)). A Dictionary of Greek Orthodoxy – Λεξικον Ελληνικης Ορθοδοξιας. Light & Life Publishing, Minnesota, 1984.
- Rev. A. H. Hore. Eighteen centuries of the Orthodox Greek Church. London: James Parker & Co. 1899. 706pp. (Re-printed: Gorgias Press LLC, 2003.)
- Vasilios Makrides (Professor). Hellenic Temples and Christian Churches: A Concise History of the Religious Cultures of Greece from Antiquity to the Present. New York University Press, 2009. 345 pp. ISBN 9780814795682
- Victor Roudometof and Vasilios Makrides (Eds.). Orthodox Christianity in 21st Century Greece: The Role of Religion in Culture, Ethnicity, and Politics. Ashgate Publishing, Ltd., 2010. 258 pp. ISBN 9780754666967
