= Monastery of Saint David =

The Monastery of Saint David may refer to:

- The Monastery of Saint David the Elder in Greece
- The Monastery of Saint David, Wales
