= Macrina of Portaria =

- Born: 1921
- Died: 4 June 1995 (aged 73–74); Volos
- Occupation: Hegumen, nun

Macrina of Portaria (in Greek: Μακρίνα της Πορταριάς), also known as Elder Macrina (1921-1995) was a nun, hegumen, and monastery founder. A disciple and friend of Ephraim of Arizona and Joseph the Hesychast, she is credited with several miracles according to Eastern Orthodox hagiographical accounts about her.

Macrina founded the Monastery of Panagia Hodigitria of Portaria in 1963 and distinguished herself as an hegumen and spiritual mother. Throughout her monastic career, she received numerous visitors seeking her spiritual guidance, including Iakovos of Evia. She gained a certain notoriety during her lifetime and died within the community she had established.

== Biography ==
She was born with the name Maria Vassopoulou in 1921 in the vicinity of Smyrna. Her family, described as devout Christians, had to flee after the fall of Smyrna to Turkish troops, who committed numerous massacres and ethnic cleansings there. They moved to Greece when she was only six months old and had to settle in the refugee camp of Nea Ionia. According to hagiographical accounts about her, she experienced a "divine transformation" at the age of seven and turned towards the Christian faith, even as she had to abandon her studies to work.

Her parents died while she and her brother were still young, and she had to start working quickly to support their financial needs, partly as a housekeeper for a wealthy family. Living in Volos with her younger brother, whom she educated, she first met Ephraim of Arizona, who was then a young monk and a disciple of Joseph the Hesychast. According to hagiographies, she is said to have performed a miracle that predicted the beginning of World War II, some time before it actually started.

In 1940-1941, during the occupation of Greece in World War II, a significant famine, partly orchestrated by the Nazi and Italian occupying authorities, affected the entire country and resulted in the deaths of approximately 300,000 people. The situation for Vassopoulou and her younger brother, George, worsened, and she decided to send him to their uncle in Thessaloniki so that he could be fed.

She managed to survive the war, albeit with great difficulty, and despite her significant poverty, she distributed some of the food she obtained to those in need, like herself. Vassopoulou was then in contact with the mother of Ephraim of Arizona, Victoria Moraitis, the future Elder Theophano, and the two met and prayed together. A small female community gradually began to form around them.

Ephraim of Arizona stated about this period, presenting a vision of uncreated energies, a central principle of Eastern Orthodox theology of deification (theosis), that she would have experienced:

Once at Pascha, after long and hard work, she managed to gather money to buy herself a candle at the service of the Bright Resurrection of Christ. However, when she went to church, she ran into a poor and hungry girl. Not thinking about her own poverty in the slightest, she gave her what she had gathered with such labor. So she went to church without a candle. When the moment came to receive the holy light and all the people went up to the priest with their candles, Maria stood behind everyone, having no candle. She stood in darkness, crying and saying: “O, my Christ! What a sinner I am, not worthy of even one candle on Your feast.” At that moment, as she was saying this with tears and self-reproach, she suddenly saw the Uncreated Light. Maria lost consciousness, and the people, thinking she fainted from hunger, carried her home in their arms.

In 1952, Ephraim distanced himself from the emerging community following slander about him. In the search for a spiritual figure to replace him and guide the community in his stead, the choice logically fell on Joseph the Hesychast, canonized in 2020, as he was Ephraim's spiritual father. He accepted the request and then asked that the future Macrina, still named Maria at the time, take charge of the community, following a vision he would have received. He declared:

Render obedience to Maria, for I beheld her in a vision this evening during prayer. I saw many sheep around her, and she stood in the middle. So I understood that I should make her the gerontissa. So, listen to Maria, and may no one contradict her.

Finally, a few years later, in 1963, Maria Vassopoulou and Victoria Moraitis were officially tonsured by Ephraim as nuns under the names Macrina and Theophano, respectively. The community then founded the Monastery of Panagia Hodigitria in Portaria, meaning the monastery of the "All-Holy Guide of the Way". She became its hegumen and is credited with miracles in Eastern Orthodox hagiographies. According to these accounts, she is notably said to have had visions of saints who appeared to her and prayed with her.

Elder Macrina gradually gained respect and a certain fame within Eastern Orthodox circles. She quickly became renowned for her spiritual advice and saw a number of Orthodox dignitaries and laypeople flock to her for counsel and spiritual direction. Among the visitors who came to seek her guidance was Iakovos of Evia, canonized in 2017.

She led the monastery until her death on 4 June 1995.

== Legacy ==
=== Eastern Orthodox circles ===
Elder Macrina gained a very favorable reputation during her lifetime in the Eastern Orthodox world, where she was seen as a renowned spiritual mother. The miracles attributed to her in hagiographical accounts of her life, the quality of her spiritual advice, and her connections with many saints reinforced this perception. Sophrony of Essex, canonized in 2019, stated about her that she was "a titan of the spirit".

Although she is not officially canonized, the Metropolis of Morphou used the title of Venerable to describe her in 2024.
