= Saint David of Euboea =

16th century Greek Orthodox abbot and Saint

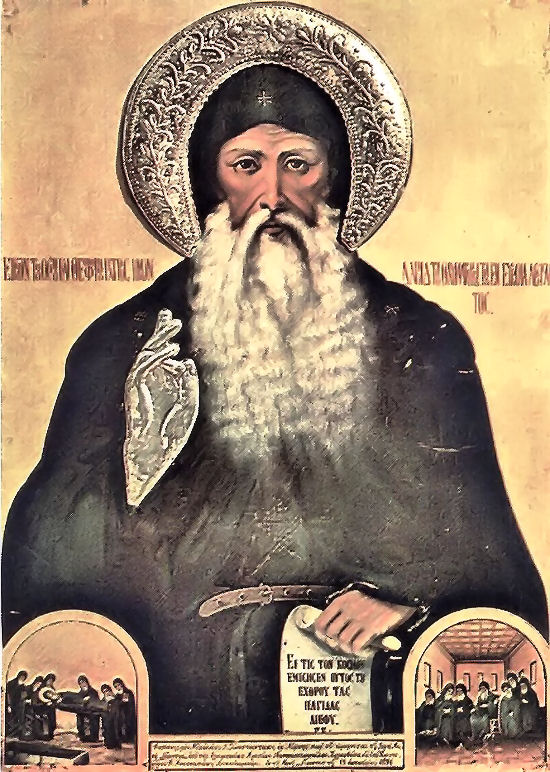
- Depiction of David of Euboea
- Died: 1589; Euboea, Greece
- Honored in: Eastern Orthodox Church

Saint David of Euboea was born in Gardenitsa (the former cadastral district of the community of Kyparissi, Phthiotis), probably in the last quarter of the 15th century (around 1490, according to Ch. G. Petrinelis, but according to other biographers around 1485, while the metropolitan of Gortyna and Megalopolis, Theophilos Kanavos mention the year 1519), and lived until the first half of the 16th century.

He served as abbot of Panagia Varnakova Monastery between 1520 and 1532, then moved to northern Evia, to the settlement of Drymonas in the present-day municipality of Elymnia (former community of Rovia). There he founded a monastery that became famous and now bears his name, the Monastery of Saint David of Evia. He was one of the enlightened teachers of the nation, contributing to the education of the enslaved Greeks, but also a saint of the Greek Orthodox Church, to whom several miracles are attributed. Both he and his successor, Saint Jacob Tsalikis, are known as miracle-working saints.
