= Augoustinos Kantiotes =

Metropolitan Augoustinos Kantiotes of Florina (Greek: Αυγουστίνος Καντιώτης, 20 April 1907 – 28 August 2010) was a bishop of the Greek Orthodox Church. He was born on 20 April 1907 in Lefkés, Paros.

Kantiotes was a defender of traditional Greek Orthodox beliefs and Greek nationalism. He was a writer of spiritual literature and is credited for the spiritual renewal of Greece and the establishment of traditional Orthodox theology. He also preached countless sermons that have been recorded and distributed worldwide. For many years, he was at the forefront of the anti-ecumenism movement since he believed that ecumenism contradicted the basic principles of Greek Orthodoxy. Kantiotes is known for his conservative activism and ideals; for example, in 1952, he led a 1500-strong group that protested the "Miss Greece" pageant, denouncing what he saw to be an "exhibition of naked bodies", a "scandal" and an "orgy". Despite support from the Holy Synod of the Greek Church, he was unsuccessful in his campaign to ban beauty pageants; in fact, the 1952 pageant was attended by many, including former prime minister Konstantinos Tsaldaris, who was a prominent conservative politician, and the Athens Police Chief at the time. Bishop Augoustinos also denounced the implicit neo-paganism he saw in the use of the Olympic flame. Augoustinos, who published over 80 books in Greek, of which over 25 have appeared in English, and other languages, was known as a classic writer in the English-speaking world of Orthodox Christianity.

In 1958, Greek theologian and University of Athens professor Panagiotis Trembalas testified to the Archdiocese of Athens that Augoustinos was mentally ill. In 1960, Metropolitan of Chios Panteleimon also testified that Augoustinos was mentally disturbed. On June 25, 1967, the newly elected Archbishop of Athens, who was installed earlier the same year by the far right military dictatorship of Greece, ordained Augoustinos as Bishop of Florina. In 1971, with the support of dictator Georgios Papadopoulos, Augoustinos succeeded in demolishing the main historic cathedral in Florina St. Panteleimon and replaced it with a new Greek style structure. In 1972 with the aid of the army, which Papadopoulos made available to Kantiotes, demolished the historic church of Amyntaio and many others in the region of Florina. Augoustinos pointed to the "danger" of the old church buildings collapsing; however, according to residents and recent church publications, he intended to destroy the churches purposefully because they were of Slavic architectural style and contained Slavic inscriptions.

During the dictatorship Augoustinos also succeeded in removing abstract public art forms from the city, including a sculpture made by acclaimed Greek sculptor Dimitris Kalamaras, and in 1981 Augoustinos expelled a priest from his diocese for baptizing the infant son of Kalamaras. Only shortly after his death in 2010 was the sculpture was re-installed in Florina, having been on display in the Athens metro since its removal. In the early 1990s, at the height of the dispute between Greece and North Macedonia, Augoustinos tried to prevent the marriage between a man in his diocese and a woman from the neighboring city of Bitola, but later allowed the marriage on the condition that they would not play any Slavic language songs at their wedding. During the same period, Augoustinos also organized protests in Florina to prevent the acclaimed filmmaker Theo Angelopoulos (who was critical of the dictatorship) from filming in Florina his newest movie, The Suspended Step of the Stork.

Kantiotes suffered a stroke on 3 August 2010, and was admitted to General Hospital of Florina Eleni Th. Dimitriou. He died of kidney failure on 28 August 2010, at age 103.
