= Iakovos of Evia =

Greek Eastern Orthodox saint

Saint Iakovos of Evia

Abbot, Elder, Father
- Born: 5 November 1920; Livisi, Asia Minor, Ottoman Empire (now Turkey)
- Died: 21 November 1991 (aged 71); Evia, Greece
- Venerated in: Eastern Orthodox Church
- Canonized: 17 November 2017 by the Holy Synod of the Ecumenical Patriarchate
- Major shrine: Monastery of Saint David of Evia
- Feast: 22 November

Iakovos Tsalikis (Greek: Ιάκωβος Ευβοίας, November 5, 1920 – November 21, 1991), also known as Iakovos of Evia (and Saint Jacob/James Tsalikis) was an Ottoman-born Greek saint in the Eastern Orthodox Church. He was abbot of the Monastery of Saint David the Elder.

== Life ==
=== Childhood ===
Iakovos Tsalikis was born on November 5th, 1920, in Livisi, Asia Minor. Iakovos was one of nine children his mother Theodora gave birth to. His family, alongside hundreds of thousands of other Asia Minor Greeks were forced to migrate to Greece as refugees of the Greek genocide perpetrated by the Ottoman Empire and Kemalists. His father Stavros was taken captive by the Turks, although he was later rejoined to his family, and the Tsalikis family moved to the island of Evia. Iakovos was descended of many holy men, with many men in his family having been priests. As a child, with help from his pious mother who taught him how to pray and serve God, grew to love the faith. By the age of seven, Iakovos had already memorized the entire Divine Liturgy, despite the fact he was illiterate. Young Iakovos expressed from a young age a desire to be a monastic. He became known as the "monk" in his village, as he was practicing fasting and prayer at such a young age.

On a hill outside his village, there was a shrine to Saint Paraskevi, where the children of the village would go for school. However, Iakovos, with his zeal for the Saints, would visit the shrine twice a day, in order to clean and light the vigil lamps and pray before the icons. One day as Iakovos was praying in the shrine, Saint Paraskevi appeared to him. Iakovos was very frightened and ran away from the shrine. Several days later, the Saint appeared again, but this time Iakovos was not afraid. Saint Paraskevi prophesied to Iakovos, telling him great amounts of wealth would pass through his hands, yet he would touch none of it. This proved to be true until the Elders repose, as he was known for his immense generosity and charity.

In the year 1942, after receiving a message from an angel, Iakovos' mother Theodora informed Iakovos that she was going to pass away in a few days. The message proved true, as two days later Theodora passed away. Iakovos was deeply grieved that he had lost his mother, however he was comforted after having received a vision of her in his sleep. Before she passed, Theodora informed Iakovos that he would be holy, and that he would be able to be a monk, but he could only become one after his sister, Anastasia, was married.

=== Military service ===
Iakovos was drafted into the Greek military in 1947, where he was able to maintain his ascetic way of living. He kept the fasts of the Church and was even granted leave to attend Church services during Holy Week and Pascha. Iakovos' piousness earned him the nickname "Father Iakovos", which was used by his fellow soldiers in order to tease him. Iakovos was of course not willing to harm his fellow man in his military service, so he kept an icon of Saint Haralambos on his rifle, and Iakovos would plead with the Saint to keep him from having to fight. Iakovos was discharged from the military in 1949, and upon returning his father Stavros passed away.

=== Entrance to Monastic Life ===
When Iakovos' sister was married in 1951, he was finally free to become a monk. His initial intention was to go to the Holy Land, but before his departure, he visited the Monastery of Saint David the Elder, wherein he had a vision of Saint David of Euboea, heavenly beings, and heavenly ascetics. After having physically seen the elder, Iakovos decided he was going to remain in the monastery. The monastery was in terrible condition upon Iakovos' arrival, with it only being inhabited by 3 other monks, who did nothing to improve the condition of the monastery. His cell had no floor and holes in the roof, and the Saint would wake up some mornings covered in snow. Despite the deplorable conditions of the monastery and harsh treatment from the other monks, Iakovos continued on his journey and was tonsured a monk on November 30th, 1952.

=== Hieromonk ===
A month after his tonsuring as a monk, on December 17th, Iakovos was ordained to the Diaconate, and just two days later was ordained a priest by Metropolitan Gregory of Halkida. Iakovos felt extremely unworthy of being a priest of God, and never himself sought any position of authority or power. Iakovos turned out to be perfect for the role, as he devoted his life to serving the Divine Liturgy.

The Elder was appointed abbot of the monastery in 1975 and was by then very well known by the faithful of Evia. Iakovos received thousands of pilgrims in his lifetime, some for confession, others for prayers, and some just to see the Elder's face. With all the new visitors, the monastery saw an increase in funding and was able to make many new and much needed improvements to the monastery.

The Elder was granted the ability to see with spiritual eyes during the Divine Liturgy. "If people saw what happens during the Divine Liturgy" the Elder said, "they would never leave the Church!" On one occasion, monks heard Father Iakovos whispering very politely to "make some room, back up a bit!" Although they couldn't see who he was speaking to, Iakovos was asking the angels in the Altar to move back so that he could cense the Altar.

The Saint had many occurrences with the angels of the Lord:

“People… don’t see what takes place in Church during the Divine Liturgy. Once I was serving and I couldn’t make the Great Entrance because of what I saw. I suddenly felt someone pushing me by my shoulder and guiding me toward the Holy Prothesis. I thought it was the chanter. I turned around and saw a huge wing that the Archangel had laid on my shoulder, and that he was guiding me to make the Great Entrance. What amazing things take place in the Altar during the Divine Liturgy!”

=== "Friend of the Saints" ===
Iakovos was counted worthy of many visions of various Saints in his lifetime, as well as being known to converse with the Saints as if they were a friend right in front of him. He would often speak to Saint David and Saint John the Russian and ask them for their intercessions. On one occasion, a novice monk heard Elder Iakovos speaking very sternly, almost yelling, at Saint David for the lack of food in the monastery, that it was his responsibility to keep the workers and monks fed, as Iakovos would often tell people "Son, Saint David is the abbot here." Iakovos even went as far as to threaten to not cense Saint Davids icon during the Liturgy.

Iakovos was particularly close as well with Saint John the Russian, who he would refer to as "Divine John." Iakovos would often visit his shrine and light candles and pray, and many times Iakovos saw the Saint alive in the shrine. He would call upon Saint David and Saint John in times of need and would notice that Saint John would arrive quicker. Iakovos attributed this to the fact that Saint John reposed when he was younger, while Saint David was older when he had passed.

=== Demonic Attacks and Exorcisms ===
Demons have played a part in the life of Elder Iakovos. When the demons could not defeat him with dark thoughts and temptations, the demons advanced to physically assaulting him, an event which happened on multiple occasions. During one of these fights, the demons restrained his arm, so the Elder was unable to make the sign of the Cross and punched him in the jaw when he attempted to call upon the most holy Theotokos. When he regained his strength, he called upon the Mother of God and the demons were dispelled.

Because of these encounters with the devil, Iakovos was given the ability from God to rebuke and cast demons out of people. Iakovos would use the skull of Saint David to bless people, as well as to cast demons out of possessed faithful. The demons hated Iakovos, especially because of his humility. During exorcisms, the demons would say to him "Iakovos, thank Saint David for his prayers, else I would drag you to hell!" When the demon could not discourage him, it would switch its tactics, by saying "Iakovos, you are a great saint! You all have a saint here in your midst!", to which the Elder would reply: "I am humble, I am but dust and ashes."

=== Illness and death ===
From the age of fifty-five onward, Iakovos experienced a succession of illnesses. Despite his reluctance, many of these conditions required medication, frequent hospital visits, multiple surgeries, and a pacemaker. He was diagnosed with many painful conditions such as testicular torsion and varicose veins, he was weakened from extreme fasting despite doctors' advice, and his legs and feet were withered from all-night vigils. He comforted his spiritual children by telling them, "I will depart like a little bird."

On November 21st, 1991, Iakovos went to Divine Liturgy and received Holy Communion, heard some confessions, and returned to his cell. Later that day, surrounded by several monks and priests, he reposed in the Lord, as he said, giving up his spirit as a little bird. Before his repose, he wrote "Lord, remember your servant Iakovos the Hieromonk" on the bottom of a Cross in his cell.

The funeral of Saint Iakovos was attended by thousands of faithful, many of whom exclaimed "A Saint! A Saint!"

== Posthumous miracles ==
There are over 300 testimonies of believers relating to Iakovos's healings, beneficial interventions, and appearances.

In 1992, a young Deacon from Cyprus visited the Monastery to meet Elder Iakovos, only to find out that the Saint had reposed almost a year prior. He took a photo of the corner of the monastic cell of Saint Iakovos, then took it to be developed, only to find the Elder depicted, fully vested. The date stamp of 8 October 1992 is at the bottom left of the photo. Regarding the image, journalist M.G. Michaels stated:

"I have one observation that I made about the photo. The late Elder is full-bodied, in gigantic proportions, in relation to the space in his cell and the very near distance to the wall from where the photo was taken. Make a comparison with the photo on the cover of your book. A professional Cypriot photographer told me that it takes at least 15 feet to shoot a full-length upright person."

In 2002, a man was aboard an Olympic flight from Greece to America. Just before crossing the Atlantic Ocean, the plane encountered a storm, in which the plane was struck by lightning, cracking the cockpit glass. The plane began to depressurize and fell to about 18,000 feet.

"When “connect” came on, I said my prayer and invoked Father James (Iakovos) and Saint David. I always had their icons with me and held them in my hands during those difficult moments and begged them very strongly. It was all I could do. I was sitting in the third row in business class in the window on the left side of the plane. And I suddenly see Father Iakovos flying out of the clouds!!! His rasas were inflated in the wind like an umbrella, and he had his right hand up with an open palm coming towards the plane. In the moments of the fall, he put his hand on the belly of the plane and held it in his fist until he stabilized it. After fixing it on its course, he disappeared in the clouds from the same direction it came."

Through the intercessions of Saint Iakovos and Saint David, the plane was saved, rescuing about 250 passengers.

== Veneration ==
On November 27, 2017, the Ecumenical Patriarch of Constantinople Bartholomew canonized him as a saint of the Eastern Orthodox Church. His feast day was set for November 22 (Gregorian Calendar) / December 5 (Julian).

Iakovos is the patron saint of the Greek Orthodox Metropolis of New Jersey.

== Quotes ==
"We are not Sanctified by the place in which we live, but by the way we live. We may be on the Holy Mountain (Mount Athos) but, in our thoughts, be in the world. Or we may be here [in the world] in body, but noetically on the Holy Mountain."

"Do not hope in the world. Be careful in your social interactions. Never listen to what the world is telling you. Temptations come; we’re human. The devil has many feet, altars and traps. Everything will be faced during marriage with love, meekness and patience. Have faith in God and Prayer and everything will go according to the Will of God."

"One time we were praying the Small Compline with the fathers in my cell. I opened the door to go outside, and I saw the devil appearing again as an immodest woman. She turned around and showed her “backside” saying shameless words. I grabbed my Icon of Panagia and went outside, saying, Under your compassion we take refuge, O Theotokos… And then, like a bullet whistling out of a gun, the devil was shot over the roof of the Monastery and exploded on the hill across the valley with a loud, echoing noise."

"Pray with faith, counsel [your children]… with love, in a gentle way."
