= Monastery of Saint David the Elder =

Monastery on Euboia, Greece

- Ιερά Μονή Οσίου Δαυίδ του Γέροντος
- Location within Greece
- Interactive map of Monastery of Saint David the Elder

Monastery information
- Established: c.1540
- Dedication: Transfiguration of Jesus
- Diocese: Metropolis of Chalkida

People
- Important associated figures: Saint David of Euboea

Site
- Location: Drimona, Euboea, Greece
- Coordinates: 38.8459°N 23.2820°E

The Monastery of Saint David the Elder (Greek: Ιερά Μονή Οσίου Δαυίδ του Γέροντος), also known as the Monastery of Saint David of Euboea (Ιερά Μονή Οσίου Δαυίδ Ευβοίας), is a Greek Orthodox monastery located near the village of Drimona, near the town of Limni, on the Greek island of Euboea.

== History ==
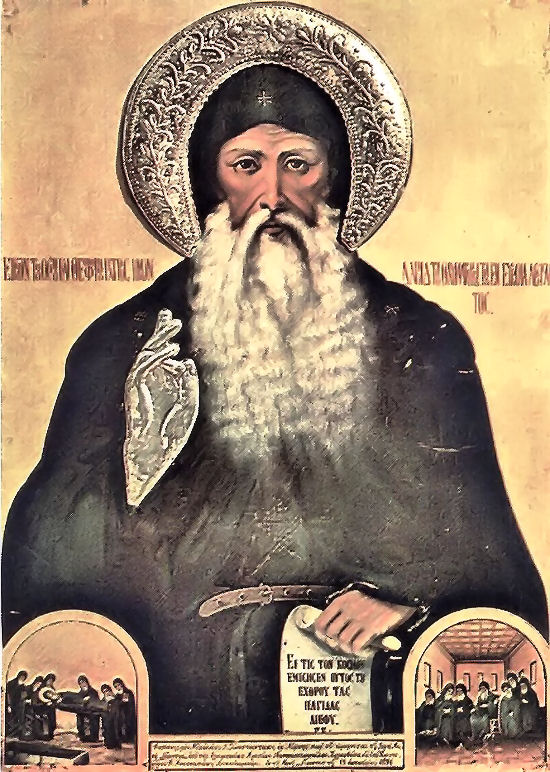
Saint David of Euboea (c.1480 - c.1589).

It was built in 1520 by the young (at that time) ascetic David, using contributions from rich monks and Christians of Greece, Moldovlachia and Russia. During the Turkish domination the Monastery became a shelter for the miserable inhabitants of the area and «hidden school» for non Muslim population of the Ottoman Empire. In 1824 Turks butchered all the Monks and burnt the Monastery.

After the Greek War of Independence, a new monastery was founded. In 1870 the Katholikon of the monastery that is dedicated to the Transfiguration of Jesus and to the holy founder Venerable David, was destroyed by an earthquake. It was rebuilt in 1877 by Anthimos Aggelis who was Abbot at that time. The largest estate of the Monastery was expropriated in 1933.

In 1951, in the priorship of Archimandrite Nikodemos Thomas, the Monastery was restored from the beginning and many new chapels (Saint Archangel Michael, Holy martyr Polycarpus, Saint Varvara, Saint George and Assumption of the Virgin, Venerable Eiriny Chrysovalantou, Saint Nectarios, Saint Vasil and Saint Demetrios) were built. A new building contains large guest rooms which can offer hospitality to over one hundred worshippers. Only one part of the east aisle of the old building of the Monastery is preserved. Of particular interest is the chapel of Saint Charalampos, that firstly was the cell of Saint David, where he stayed every Saturday. The Byzantine chapel (catacomb) of Saints Anargyros is found undamaged under it. It is decorated with wall paintings of the 18th century.

The Igumen from 1975 to 1991 was Elder Iakovos (Tsalikis), who was formally glorified as a saint on November 27, 2017, by the Sacred and Holy Synod of the Ecumenical Patriarchate, following the approval and recommendation of the Church of Greece. The feast day of Venerable Iakovos of Euboea The New Ascetic was set on November 22 each year. His glorification was liturgically celebrated on Sunday June 3, 2018, at St. David Monastery, headed by His All-Holiness Ecumenical Patriarch Bartholomew, with the concelebration of 30 Orthodox bishops from the Greek and Cypriot Orthodox Churches and the Ecumenical Patriarchate.

== Holy water ==
The agionery (holy water) is found about 1 km north of the Monastery. According to tradition, Saint David struck the rock with his stick and it gushed curative holy water.

== Venerable David's cave ==
To the south of the Monastery, about twenty minutes on foot, near a ravine, the pilgrim finds a cave. It, according to tradition, was the room of the training (Asceterion) of Saint David, who lived on scanty bread all the week.

== Reliquary and museum ==
It is worth mentioning the Reliquary of the Monastery, where, besides the relics of Saint David, relics of many Saints (Protomartyr Stefanos, Cyprianus, Justin, Tryfon, Charalampus, Panteleymon, Therapon, Anargyron Cyrus and John) are kept. These have been carried by David from the Ecumenical Patriarchate in the patriarchy of Jeremia II the Grand (Tranos). In the end, Venerable David's Russian stole and a Russian censer, his staff, old icons and three woodcut-crosses are saved in the Museum of the Monastery. One of the three crosses is from the era of Palaiologoi.
