= Maroutsaia School =

- Μαρουτσαία Σχολή
- Ioannina; Greece

Information
- Established: 1742
- Founder: Maroutsis family
- Closed: 1797
- Headmaster: 1742-1746 Eugenios Voulgaris; 1746-1750 Anastasios Monispiniotis; 1750-1753 Eugenios Voulgaris; 1753-; Tryphon of Metsovo

The Maroutsaia School (Greek: Μαρουτσαία Σχολή) or Maroutsios was a Greek educational institution that operated in Ioannina from 1742 to 1797. The school reached its peak under Eugenios Voulgaris, one of the main representative of the modern Greek Enlightenment. This period also marked the first phase of renaissance of Greek education in Ioannina.

== Under Eugenios Voulgaris ==
During the 18th century Ioannina was a cultural and educational center of the Ottoman ruled Greek world, while education was flourishing. The Maroutsaia school was sponsored by members of the Maroutsis family, successful merchants and benefactors that were active in Venice.

First schoolmaster of the Maroutsaia became the theologian and scholar Eugenios Voulgaris. Voulgaris apart from Greek taught also Latin, Philosophy, and experimental physics. In general he was an agent of modernization, advocated Newtonian science and philosophy, but on the other hand insisted that the Greek intellectual revival, which was underway, should remain theologically and socially conservative. Voulgaris also included John Locke's epistemology in his teaching, as well as translations of works of Gottfried Leibniz and Christian Wolff. Although Voulgaris did not use the vernacular Greek language (Demotic) in his teachings, he was considered a progressive scholar.

== Decline ==
Because of his progressive teaching methods, Voulgaris was denounced by conservative scholars, like Balanos Vasilopoulos, director of another local school of the city, the Balanios. In 1753, Voulgaris left Ioannina and he was succeeded by the theologian Tryphon of Metsovo, who continued the educational methods of the former.

The Maroutsaia faced financial problems during the following decades since the Maroutsis couldn't sponsor the school any more. The political instability in Venice faced with the French occupation of the city made this situation even worse and, in 1797, the school had to close due to financial difficulties. However, during the same year it reopened but with a new administration and name, Kaplaneios, after Zois and Manthos Kaplanis who founded this new school.

== Notable graduates ==
- Theodore Kavalliotis
- Michail Papageorgiou
- Athanasios Psalidas
- Athanasios Tsakalov
