= Methodios Anthrakites =

Greek mathematician and philosopher

The Reverend Methodios Anthrakites
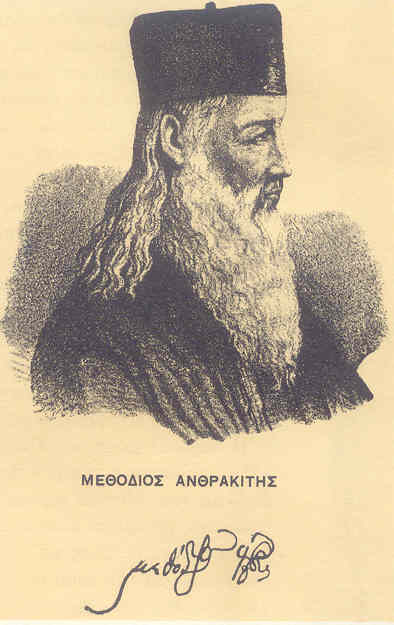
- Born: 1660; Kaminia, Epirus, Ottoman Empire
- Died: 1736 (aged 75–76); Ioannina, Epirus, Ottoman Empire

Methodios Anthrakites (Greek: Μεθόδιος Ανθρακίτης; 1660–1736) was a Greek Orthodox cleric, author, educator, mathematician, astronomer, physicist, and philosopher.

He directed the Gioumeios and Epiphaneios Schools in Ioannina. He also supported the use of the people's language in education instead of archaic forms of Greek. He was involved in a controversy regarding Korydalism. He is known for being persecuted for introducing modern philosophical thought to Greek education, the incident is widely known as the Methodios Affair. He made a significant contribution to the growth of the Modern Greek Enlightenment during the Ottoman occupation of Greece.

== Life ==
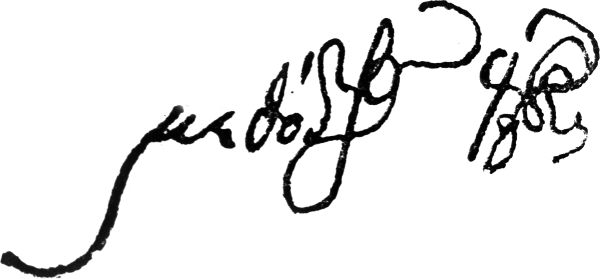
Methodios Anthrakites' signature.

Anthrakites was born in the village of Kaminia (Καμινιά) or Kamnia (Καμνιά), in the Zagori region (Epirus). He studied in the Gioumeios (later Balaneios) School in Ioannina under Georgios Sougdouris. After becoming a priest, he left for Venice in 1697, where he studied philosophy, mathematics, geometry, trigonometry, astronomy, and physics. His stay in Venice lasted until 1708, he was a priest at San Giorgio dei Greci. He was associated with Meletius Tipaldi a former Greek Orthodox convert to Roman Catholicism living in Venice. He urged Methodios to publish three of his works at the printing house of Nikolaos Glykis. In 1699 Christian Theories and Spiritual Advises, 1707 Spiritual Visitation and in 1708, Shepherd of Reasonable Sheep. He returned to Greece in 1708 and become the first director of the Ierospoudasterion, a new school founded in Kastoria in Macedonia. The benefactor was Georgios Kastriotis, a wealthy Greek from Kastoria, who lived in Wallachia. Anthrakites focused on teaching contemporary European philosophy and mathematics.

In 1710, he was called to take over the management of the Kyritzi School in Kastoria. At the institution, he taught mathematics, Elements of Euclid, Spherics of Theodosius, geometry theoretical and practical use of geometric instruments. He also taught micrometry, altitude, surface metering, geodesy, iconography, choreography, stereometry, holometry, and sometimes trigonometry. He taught the study of spheres, astrolabe, geography, and optics. Anthrakites was an educational pioneer and became extremely popular very fast. The Galileo affair of 1633 was the persecution of Galileo Galilei involving Greek scholar Corydalleus's professor Cesare Cremonini. The issue dealt with the disbelief in heliocentrism.

The Catholic education as well as the Greek education was centered around Neo-Aristotelian philosophy. In the Greek community, this was widely known as Korydalism. Anthrakites tried to break barriers and teach modern European philosophy and logic. He tried to focus on the new teachings of Descartes and Malebranche while new philosophical doctrines were suspect across Europe and banned in some countries. Anthrakites fame gathered a huge following. Some of his students included Eugenios Voulgaris, Sevastos Leontiadis and Balanos Vasilopoulos. Balanos Vasilopoulos published Anthrakites mathematical notes in 1749. They were used in Greek textbooks for years to come. In his book The Way of Mathematics, later edited and re-printed by his student Balanos Vasilopoulos, Anthrakites referred to the Copernican heliocentric system, although he supported the geocentric system.

Anthrakites also began to introduce spoken language into his teaching. This contrasted with the view in Constantinople. The elders of the church felt Greek tradition lies in the complex Ancient Greek language. He used unconventional teaching methods of which the church became very suspicious. Just as Galileo and Descartes tried to break barriers. Anthrakites also suffered the same fate as his contemporaries. He was eventually involved in the Methodios affair as Galileo faced the inquisition for Heliocentrism. Anthrakites faced a similar fate for teaching it.

His teachings were regarded as unusual and gave rise to suspicion in church circles they began questioning his teaching methods at the school. Anthrakites resigned from the Ierospoudasterion in 1718 and moved to Siatista, then to Macedonia, where he taught for another two years. He was associated with a powerful wealthy community but they could not help him against the slander. He returned to Kastoria and in 1723 appeared before the bishop of Achris Ioasaph to defend his Christian faith. After that journey, he moved back to Ioannina where he became director of the Gioumeios. Anthrakites was suspended ("unfrocked") from the Church. Scholars from Ioannina protested the decision to the bishop of Nikopolis Paisios.

On 23 August 1723, the Patriarchate of Constantinople Jeremias III formally accused him of heresy as a follower of Spanish mystic Miguel de Molinos and Quietism and issued a condemnation of his teachings. While he was in Constantinople he hid in the basement for months refusing to burn his notes and books. It was the most difficult period in his life. His books reflected his thoughts on geometry, logic, physics, euclidean arithmetic, and philosophy. He was accused of a satanic conspiracy. He eventually burned his books in the courtyard.

Anthrakites was restored as a teacher but he was only allowed to follow Korydalism. The incident like the condemnation of Quietism by Pope Innocent XI and the Galileo affair is termed the Methodios affair. The Methodios affair led Greece into the Modern Greek Enlightenment. From 1725 he became director of the Epiphaneios School in Ioannina, probably until his death in 1736. Some of his students became very important within the Greek community and used his teaching methods and theories. Eugenios Voulgaris his student eventually taught at the Maroutsaia School from 1742 to 1746. He taught the physics and mathematics of Gottfried Wilhelm Leibniz and Isaac Newton. He also explored the philosophers John Locke, and Thomas Hobbes. Eventually, the church began to persecute Eugenios Voulgaris and he went to another institution. He did not receive the same harsh persecution as Methodios.

== Works ==
Some of his manuscripts have been lost because of his excommunication. His known works are:

- Επίσκεψις Πνευματική "Spiritual Visitation", Venice, 1707
- Βοσκός λογικών προβάτων "Shepherd of Reasonable Sheep", Venice, 1708
- Θεωρίαι χριστιανικαί και ψυχοφελείς νουθεσίαι "Christian Theories and Spiritual Advises", Venice, 1708
- Οδός Μαθηματική "The Way of Mathematics" (edited Balanos Vasilopoulos), Venice, 1749
- Λογική ελάττων "Lesser Logic", 1953
- Εισαγωγή της Λογικής "Introduction to Logic", (manuscript)
- Λόγος εις τον προφήτην Ηλίαν "Sermon on Prophetes Elias", (manuscript)

== Bibliography ==
- Israel, Jonathan I. (2006). Enlightenment Contested Philosophy, Modernity, and the Emancipation of Man 1670–1752. Oxford, UK: Oxford University Press. ISBN 9780199279227.
- McGuckin, John Anthony, ed. (2011). "Philosophy". The Encyclopedia of Eastern Orthodox Christianity. A-M. Vol. 1. West Sussex, United Kingdom: Wiley Blackwell.
- Plested, Marcus (2012). Orthodox Readings of Aquinas. Oxford, UK: Oxford University Press. ISBN 9780199650651.
