= Isaiah of Salona =

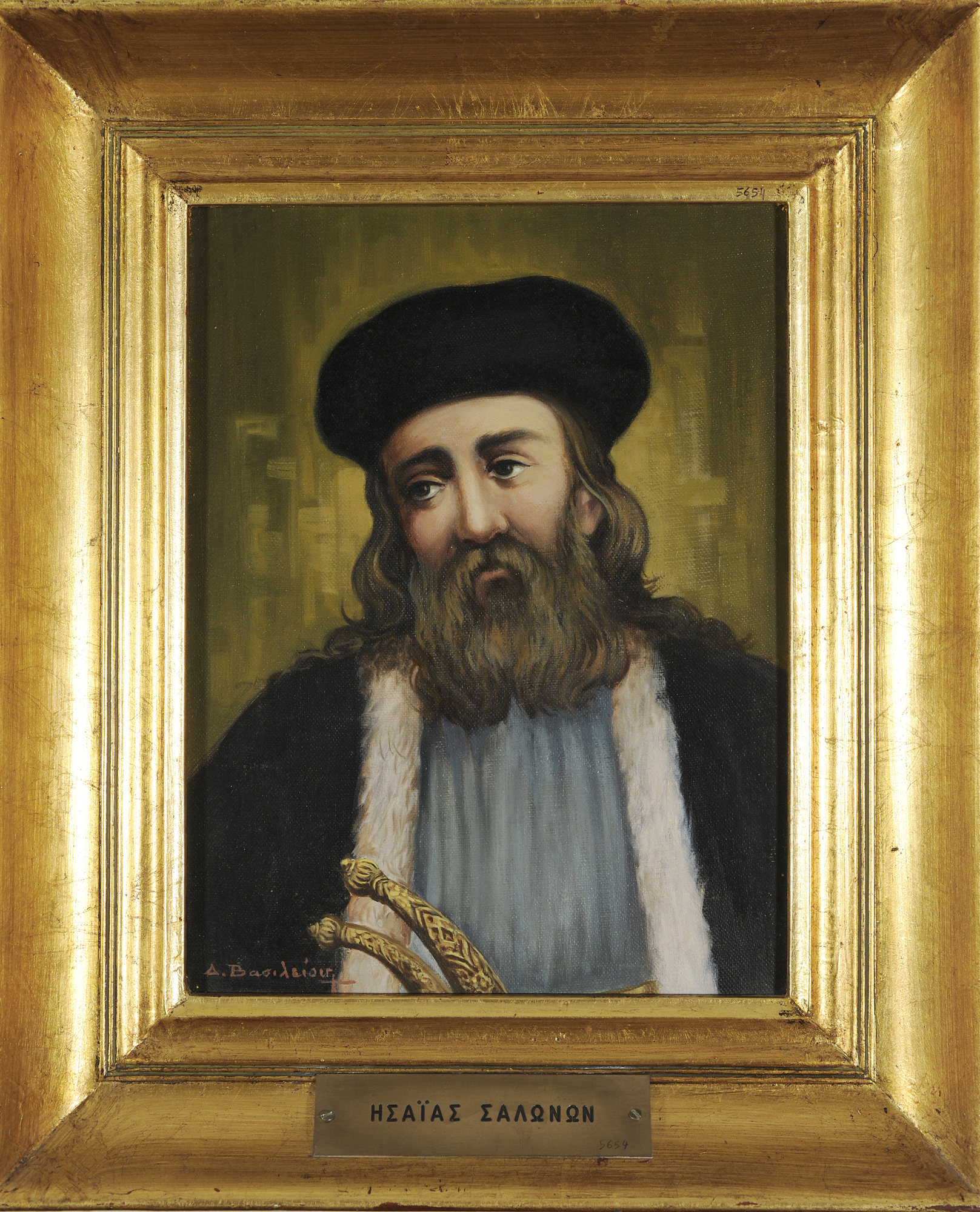
- Native name: Ησαΐας Σαλώνων

Personal details
- Born: 1780 Desfina, Phocis, Ottoman Empire (modern day Greece)
- Died: April 23, 1821 (aged 40–41)

Bishop Isaiah of Salona (Greek: Ησαΐας Σαλώνων; 1780 – 23 April 1821) was a Greek cleric. He was the first bishop who died fighting in the Greek Revolution of 1821.

== Biography ==
He was born in Desfina, Phocis, in a house near the church of Agios Charalambos in 1769 and was baptized Elias, the third child of the family of the priest Papa-Stathis and Archontos. His brothers were named Giannis (who became a shepherd) and Theodosis, who became a monk at the Monastery of Saint Luke. At the age of 18 he was sent by his father to Amfissa to prepare for a religious life, serving close to the monk named Gerasimos Lytsikas. In 1797 he became a monk in the Monastery of the Holy Forerunner of Desfina, taking the name of Isaiah and was ordained a deacon in the Monastery of Saint Luke. He studied in Ioannina, near Kosmas Balanos and Athanasios Psalidas. In Ioannina he met Ali-Pasha, whom Isaiah's father saved, named Papa-Stathis around the middle of the 18th century, when he found him half-dead in a cave and treated him. Promoted quickly Abbot, due to his young age, raised his interest from Patriarch Cyril VI of Edirne where he invited him in 1814 to Constantinople for training. There he met Patriarch Gregory V, but was also initiated into the Friendly Society, in 1818. In the same year he was ordained bishop where he took over as bishop of Salona after the death of Joachim, following the persuasions of local prelates and Ali's own. Two years later he became a member of the Friendly Society, developing charitable activities, raising money and weapons which he stored in Salona.

In January 1821 he was hastily summoned to Constantinople by Patriarch Gregory E. From the existing correspondence between the two men it is obvious that both of them worked from the previous year for the preparation of the Race using symbolic phrases. During this meeting, after receiving specific instructions for the Peloponnese, he went there in February, where he met the German bishops of Old Patras, Gregory of Nafplio, and Daniel of Tripoli. Then on March 11 he landed in Antikyra, returning to his diocese and from there to Livadia where he met the bishops Dionysios II of Athens and Neophytos Talantios.He then met with Athanasios Diakos, who at that time had the trust of the local leader Kara Ismail-bey, while he came to terms with the elites of the area.

== Revolutionary activities ==
In February 1821, Isaiah with his brother and the abbot of the priory of Holy Loukas Chatzis were in Constantinople where he met with the patriarch. In 11 March he returns and lands secretly in Antikyra. He goes to the priory of Holy Loukas Chatzis, where Athanasios Diakos was waiting for him. In the evening prayer, he swears to the Revolution the askeri of Diakos. He then goes to Salona and makes arrangements with Panourgias. Weapons and ammunition arrives from Galaxidi and they have been distributed to the homes of the prominent. In 24 March, he blesses again the ammunition of the men of Panourgias, at the monastery of the prophet Ilias. There are also present the provosts of the Salonon Anagnostis Giaghtzis, Anagnostis Kehagias, Rigas Kontorigas. In 25 March Gkouras conquers Galaxidi and in the 28th of March Skaltsodimos conquers Lidoriki. In 26 March, Isaiah arrives again in Holy Loukas where Diakos is. A glorification is taking place and the next day the armed men left to fight. In 27 March, the siege against the castle of Salonon begins from the revolutionaries of Panourgias, while in town a Greek administration is being held. An official beginning of the Revolution is being carried out in town from Isaiah Salonon swearing the revolutionaries along with the two other bishops at the monastery of Holy Loukas, that had become the Agia Sophia of Roumeli. While the monasteries of Prodromos and Saint Paraskevi are blessing the weapons of the attendees against the Ottoman Turkish fighters, essentially proclaiming officially the Revolution in Boeotia. In first of April Livadia is conquered.

After the fall of the Castle of Livadia in 1 April and the fall of the Castle of Salonon in 10 April (at Easter) in the hands of the Greeks, Isaiah hurried to meet Diakos and Diovouniotis at Zitouni. Joining in the fight of Alamana Isaiah, holding the Cross, leading the Greek fighters. But in the collision with the troops of Omer Vrionis he is fatally injured while at the same time his brother is also being killed, the preach known as Priest Ioannis. The Ottoman beheaded the dead body of Isaiah, his brothers and others Greek fighters and placed them oppositely from Diakos while he was being brutally executed with impalement in Lamia. After his death the threw them in a waft along with the body of the executed.

== Legacy ==
The building of the museum in remembrance of Despotis Salonon Isaiah was built over the land the house of Isaiah was in, in Desfina of Fokida. It was created by the previous municipality of Desfina (now Municipal Unity of Desfina of Delfoi Municipality) in cooperation with the Prefectural self-government of Fokida along with the conjunction of the society of under the protection of the Sacred Metropolis of Fokida. The opening of the museum was a Sunday on the 28th of July in 2013, in presence of all law enforcement. In the museum some personal item of Isaiah are being exhibited such as his inflection, his sacred gospel etc., while also copies of his vestments. There are also writings and paintings of that time and a specially modified room where a documentary of his life actions is being shown.

In honor of Isaiah and his brother, a marble cross was built in 1916, close to the spring called on the highway from Amfissa to Lamia The following inscription stands on the memorial:

ΤΟΙΣ ΕΚ ΔΕΣΦΙΝΗΣ ΤΗΣ ΠΑΡΑΝΑΣΣΙΔΟΣ ΑΔΕΛΦΟΙΣ ΗΣΑΙΑ ΑΜΦΙΣΣΗΣ ΕΠΙΣΚΟΠΩ ΚΑΙ ΙΩΑΝΝΗ ΙΕΡΕΙ ΠΕΣΟΥΣΙΝ ΕΝ ΧΑΛΚΩΜΑΤΑ ΩΔΕ

23 ΑΠΡΙΛΙΟΥ 1821

ΥΠΕΡ ΠΑΤΡΙΔΟΣ ΕΙΣ ΜΑΧΗΝ ΑΛΑΜΑΝΑΣ

ΚΟΙΝΩ ΕΡΑΝΩ 1916.

There is also a bust of Isaiah exits in the outside of the metropolitan temple of Desfina and a statue of him in Amfissa.

== Bibliography ==
1. Drosos Kravartogiannos, "History of the city of Amphissis - Supplements" (published by "Association of Amphissians everywhere 'Ta Salona'", Amfissa, 1997), p. 62: "The hero Despot of the Salona of Isaiah"
2. Valaoritou: "Apanta" Volume B, published by Eleftheroudakis, Athens, 1925
3. Kremos, "Fokika", Volume B
4. Takis Lappas, "Roumelians in the Revolution", Athens, 1944
5. A. Goudas, "Parallel Lives", Volume 8
6. Philemon, "Historical Essay of the Greek Revolution", Athens, 1960, Volume 3
7. Fousekis Nikolas, "The Despot of Salona Isaiah and his contribution to '21'". In "The contribution of the Holy Clergy and the Holy Monasteries of Phocis to the nation and its region during the period of Turkish rule in the national uprising of 1821 and the modern Greek period", conference 23-25 November 2007, Amfissa. Proceedings, Amfissa 2010
8. Giasirani-Kyritsi Vasileia, The neoclassical heroes of the clergy and monks of Phocis. In "The contribution of the Holy Clergy and the Holy Monasteries of Phocis to the nation and its region during the period of Turkish rule, the national uprising of 1821 and the modern Greek period", conference 23-25 November 2007, Amfissa. Proceedings, Amfissa 2010
9. Monthly newspaper "O Agon tis Iteas", issue 902, Thursday 1 August 2013

== Further information ==
- "Great Greek Encyclopedia", vol. 12, p. 400.
- Historical Magazine (Eleftherotypias), "1821 The Proclamation of the Revolution" vol. 229 (March 24, 2004), p. 25.
