= Siege of Salona =

Siege of Salona may refer to:

- Siege of Salona (49), Caesarians in Salona repel an assault by the Pompeians under Marcus Octavius (aedile 50 BC)
- Siege of Salona (537), a siege between the Byzantine Empire forces against forces of the Ostrogoths
- Siege of Salona (1821), a siege between the Greek forces against forces of the Ottoman Empire
