= Kosmas Balanos =

Greek mathematician and school director

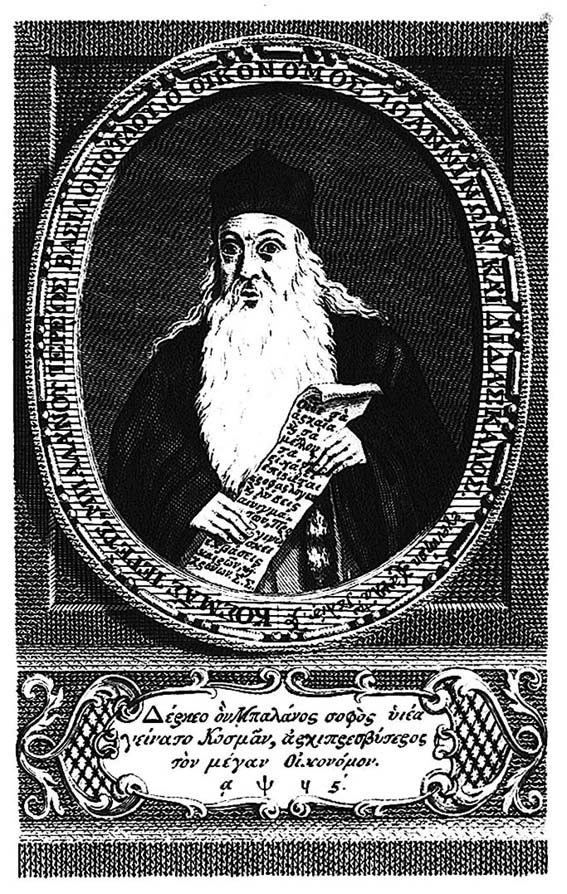
- Born: 1731; Ioannina, Ottoman Empire
- Died: 1808; Ioannina, Ottoman Empire
- Occupation(s): Mathematician head of the Gouma (or Balanaia) School
- Father: Balanos Vasilopoulos

Kosmas Balanos (Greek: Κοσμάς Μπαλάνος) (1731–1808) was a Greek mathematician, author and school director. He continued the work of his father Balanos Vasilopoulos, and was among Greece's leading scholars of his time.

== Life ==
He was born in Ioannina, a center of the 17th–18th-century modern Greek Enlightenment movement. Balanos was the first son of the scholar Balanos Vasilopoulos and became a priest like his father had done before him. He taught at various Greek-language schools of the Ottoman Empire, initially in Thessaly, and then in Thessaloniki. Around 1760 he succeeded his father as director of the Gouma School in Ioannina. During the 1790s, the Gouma school faced serious financial difficulties, but Balanos managed to find new sponsors among the prosperous Ioannite diaspora and especially the Zosimades brothers. After about 40 years in the Gouma school, Balanos left his post in 1799 to his brother Konstantinos.

Balanos, as a conservative scholar, used archaic Greek in his work and rejected the use of the Demotic, the vernacular form of the Greek language. He also became involved in a personal conflict with the progressive scholar Athanasios Psalidas, schoolmaster of the Kaplaneios School in the same city, whom he denounced to the local ruler, Ali Pasha, as an atheist and voltairianist.

== Work ==
In 1798 Balanos published in Vienna the work Έκθεσις συνοπτικής αριθμητικής, αλγέβρης και χρονολογίας (Concise Exposition of Arithmetics, Algebra and Chronology). He wrote the philosophical work Περί ελλείψεως των παραλειπομένων φωτών παρά τοις αρίστοις των ποιητών και των καταλογάδην συγγραψάντων (On the omission of the unmentioned lights by the excellent among the poets and among those whο wrote prose). Moreover, he published his father Balanos Vasilopoulos' work Έκθεσις ακριβεστάτη της Αριθμητικής (Most Precise Exposition of Arithmetic, Venice, 1803).

After his death, his work Αντιπελάργησις (Antipelargisis, Antipelargy) was published in 1816, in which he presented his father's attempt to solve the famous problem of the doubling the cube, i.e. finding the cube root of 2 by a graphical method (which was later shown to be impossible).

He composed a historical work about Epirus, in which Ioannina was the urban center, Ιστορικό της Ηπείρου (History of Epirus), which remains unpublished. Balanos also wrote various texts about the social conditions of the region he lived, like describing the forced 18th century Islamizations of local Christians by the Ottoman authorities. Moreover, he composed theological and philosophical works, as well as school textbooks. Many of these works remained unpublished and were burned with the destruction of the Balanos family library during Ali Pasha's defeat by the Sultan's forces in 1822.
