= Theophilos Corydalleus =

Greek Neo-Aristotelian philosopher (1574–1646)

Metropolitan of Nafpaktos
- In office 1640–1642

Personal details
- Born: Theophilos Corydalleus; 1574 Korydallos, Attica, Ottoman Empire
- Died: 1646 (aged 71–72) Athens, Attica, Ottoman Empire
- Resting place: Athens, Greece
- Scientific career
- Education: Saint Athanasius; University of Padua
- Known for: Korydalism
- Fields: Astronomy, geography, philosophy, cartography, physics, and mathematics
- Workplaces: University of Padua; Flanginian School; Patriarchal Academy of Constantinople
- Doctoral advisor: Cesare Cremonini

Theophilos Corydalleus (/kɔːrɪˈdæliəs/; Greek: Θεόφιλος Κορυδαλλεύς, romanized: Theofilos Korydallefs; 1574–1646) was a Greek Neo-Aristotelian philosopher who initiated the philosophical movement known as Korydalism or Corydalism. He was also an Eastern Orthodox cleric (Metropolitan of Nafpaktos), physician, physicist, astronomer, mathematician, author, educator and geographer. His philosophical thought kept influencing Greek education for two hundred years after its inception.

== Biography ==
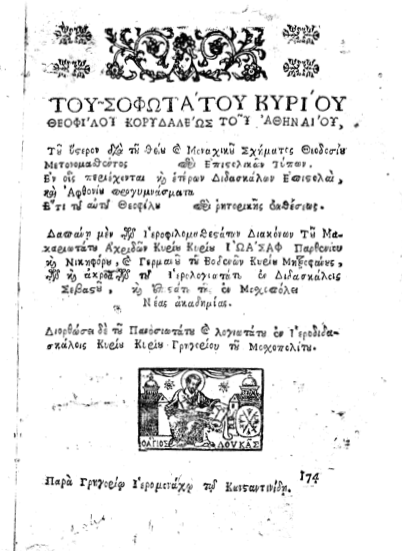
Title page of the Greek edition of The Rhetoric

Corydalleus was born in Korydallos, Attica in 1574. It was renamed from Pachy in 1923 to honor him. Korydalleus finished his initial education in Athens. From 1604 to 1608 he attended Saint Athanasius college in Rome. He continued his studies in medicine and philosophy at the University of Padua. He received his doctorate at the university on June 5 of 1613. Galileo Galilei was the chair of the mathematics department until 1610. Korydalleus met Cesare Cremonini who influenced the young Greek with Neo-Aristotelian thought. The new idea distanced Aristotelian thought from the clasp of the church's medieval Scholasticism and Averroism.

The new philosophical interpretation attempted to liberate Aristotelian thought from ecclesiastical control and apologetic objectives. The interpretation was dangerous because it was suspicious to Church authorities. The system possessed secular atheistic views. Korydalleus carefully implemented his system of Neo-Aristotelianism and avoided confrontation with the Orthodox doctrine. He felt Aristotelian philosophy should exclude Platonic influences. He felt that it should not be changed within the context of a dialogue with theology. This exhibits a major shift from Neoplatonic Byzantine views on Aristotle. His work analyzed the conflict between the Christian conception of Creation and Aristotelian ideas on the eternity of substance.

He taught Italian, Greek, and Latin in Venice from 1608 to 1609 at the Flanginian School, in Athens 1613–19, 1643–46, in Cephalonia (1619–21), and in Zakynthos 1621–22, 1628–36. Korydalleus was the director of the Patriarchal Academy of Constantinople 1622–23, 1625–28, 1636–40. He translated numerous texts from Latin, such as those by Cesare Cremonini. Cremonini was Corydalleus's mentor but he was also involved in the Galileo affair. In 1633, Galileo was prosecuted by the Roman Catholic Inquisition for his support of heliocentrism. The astronomical model assumed the Earth and planets revolve around the Sun at the center of the Solar System. Cremonini did not support Galileo, he also refused to look through his telescope and he stanchly supported Aristotle's idea that the moon was smooth. Galileo contradicted the Aristotelian idea of the incorruptibly perfect smooth Moon. Ptolemy's geocentric model was used by the Catholic Church until its decline.

Corydalleus was appointed director of the Patriarchal Academy of Constantinople by patriarch Cyril Lucaris. Korydalleus reorganized the educational curriculum following the Neo-Aristotelian model. The model emancipated philosophy from theology. Science was reintroduced to schools which led to a revolution for Orthodox education. There was a renewal of interest in Hellenic literature. The drawback of this reintroduction was that Ancient Greek thought superseded the new scientific advancement put forth by Galileo Galilei, Copernicus, and contemporaries. This is clearly demonstrated with Corydalleus's works on Claudius Ptolemy and Aristotle. A major debate at the time was Heliocentrism. In this respect, the Byzantine curriculum continued. Historians view the period of Loukaris and Korydalleus as "Orthodox humanism." The upside to the isolation of thought was an attempt to continue Greek identity in the Ottoman Empire. Most of his works served as textbooks until the nineteenth century.

Corydalleus eventually became a presbyter. He took on the name Theodosius in 1622. He served as archbishop of Arta and Naupactus from 1640 to 1642. His academic interests superseded his ecclesiastical endeavors. He devoted his life to teaching. Corydalleus was criticized and suspected of atheism. Calvinism and Protestantism were brought into the Orthodox world both Corydalleus and Cyril Lucaris were accused of following the new faith. Corydalleus was never seriously persecuted and continued to teach; his students included: patriarch Nectarius of Jerusalem, loannis Karyophyllis, Meletios Syrigos, Evgenios Yannoulis, Alexandros Mavrokordatos, and Georgios Sougdouris. Corydalleus's Neo-Aristotelianism became the philosophical education in southeastern Europe in the 17th and 18th centuries. Many of his works can still be found in the libraries of Bucharest and Jassy.

== Korydalism or Corydalism ==
At one point Corydalleus's influence was so strong the system disallowed new philosophical thought. The system sanctioned by the Church was known as Corydalism. Eventually Methodios Anthrakites tried to abandon Aristotelianism and was teaching modern western philosophy but he was ordered to teach solely Aristotelian philosophy based on Corydalleus's tradition. In the first half of the 18th century, there were debates between Aristotelians namely Dorotheos Lesvios and non-Aristotelians Nikolaos Zerzoulis. Zerzoulis tried to explain Aristotle's authority in the church by showing discrepancies between several Aristotelian and Christian views.

The Modern Greek Enlightenment during the second half of the 18th century presented alternatives to Neo-Aristotelian thought or Corydalism. Both Aristotelian physics and Ptolemaic cosmology were under attack. Corydalism continued to flourish until the Greek revolution. Corydalleus's contributions were of great importance to the development of Greek education during a period of transition from the post-Byzantine era to the age of the Greek Enlightenment.

== Geographical and astronomical works ==
- He was influenced by the development of Ptolemaic studies in Italy, where he studied in the early 17th century. Theophilos Korydaleus wrote a synopsis in Geography. He interpreted selected sections and theoretical issues from Ancient Geographic Publications. With this text, Korydalleus reconnected modern Hellenism with the Byzantine explanatory tradition. He was one of the precursors of the scientific geographical movement of Western Europe (Τσιότρας, 2006).
- His work on Astrolabes: Korydalleus continued a long scientific tradition that has its theoretical basis in Claudius Ptolemy. He was interested in the works of John Philoponus, Nicephorus Gregoras and Isaac Argyros. The astrolabe was an astronomical instrument used to measure the height of celestial bodies and the indication of time, it remained in use from antiquity until the 17th century. Korydalleus did extensive work in the field. (Τσιότρας, 1999).
- Later in life, he extensively studied and commented on Tetrabiblos also known as the Mathematical treatise in four books of Claudius Ptolemy. Theophilus Korydalleus wrote responses to Ptolemy's prognosis of air and predicting the future. He briefly paraphrased selected modules from the astrological work of the ancient geographer as an introduction to modern astrology (Τσιότρας, 2002).

== Funeral orations ==
Corydalleus wrote a funeral oration which he performed in Constantinople around 1630–1640. Poulcheria was a Greek woman who died young. She was a member of an aristocratic family who were members of the Phanariotic society. The discourse was preserved in five manuscripts. Corydalleus utilized Aristotelian doctrines discussing the separation of the soul from the body. The Immortality of the soul. The meaning of fear and the perception of time. Corydalleus implements Demotic Greek mixed with Ancient Greek wording and stylistic elements.

== Modern criticism ==
Religious scholar Vasilios N. Makrides suggests that Corydalleus's Neo-Aristotelian legacy was not an entirely positive one, stating that

By the end of the eighteenth century, it had become a hindrance to introducing new scientific ideas from Europe. This is why the Greek bearers of Enlightenment ideas criticized it, and why scores of scholars entered into debates about the validity of Neo-Aristotelianism and its place alongside Christian doctrine.

In contrast, Anastasios Tamis believes that Corydalleus's appointment as director of the academy

... was of paramount importance for the transmission of humanist and secular thought and culture into the Greek lands under the Turkish yoke. Corydalleus reorganised the Academy of the Patriarchate along the lines of Padua University, imposing a secular philosophy as the basis for higher education, and thus breaking away from its connection with theology.

== Works ==
- Study of Aristotle Questions and Answers (in Greek)
- Summary of a philosophical treatise on logic (in Greek)
- Interpretation of Aristotelian Physics (in Greek)
- Birth and Aging according to Aristotle (in Greek)
- Questions and Answers Regarding the Heavens (in Greek)
- Memories on Physics (in Greek)
- Geography (in Greek)
- Grammar (in Greek)
- Rhetoric (in Greek)
- Poetry and its structure (in Greek)
- Letters (in Greek)
- The Philosophical interpretation of Death (in Greek)

== See also ==
- Anthrakites, Methodios
- Chrysanthus of Jerusalem
- Vasilopoulos, Balanos

== Sources ==
- Ευάγγελος Παπανούτσος, «Θεόφιλος Κορυδαλεύς», Νεοελληνική Φιλοσοφία, τ. Α, εκδ. Βασική Βιβλιοθήκη-35, Αθήνα, χ.χ., σ. 18–22, 51-86
- Γιάνης Κορδάτος, Ιστορία της Νεοελληνικής λογοτεχνίας. Από το 1453 ως το 1961, τόμος πρώτος, εκδ. Επικαιρότητα, Αθήνα, 1983
- Στεφανής, Ι. Ε.: «Η αυτόγραφη επιστολή του Θεόφιλου Κορυδαλλέα προς τον Ιωάννη Καρυοφύλλη». Ελληνικά 37 (1986), 160-163
- Τσιότρας, Β. Ι., Η εξηγητική παράδοση της Γεωγραφικῆς ὑφηγήσεως του Κλαυδίου Πτολεμαίoυ. Οι επώνυμοι Σχολιαστές, Αθήνα 2006, Μορφωτικό Ίδρυμα Εθνικής Τραπέζης.
- Τσιότρας, Βασίλειος Ι. (1995). Αυτόγραφη επιστολή του Θεόφιλου Κορυδαλλέως προς τον Antoine Léger.. Ο Ερανιστής. 20. Όμιλος Μελέτης του Ελληνικού Διαφωτισμού: 235–242. doi:10.12681/er.245.
- Τσιότρας, Β. Ι., «Πολύπους εναντίον πύθωνος. Μια μαρτυρία για τη δράση του Θεοφίλου Κορυδαλλέως στη Ζάκυνθο», Πρακτικά του Διεθνούς Συνεδρίου «Άγιοι και εκκλησιαστικές προσωπικότητες στη Ζάκυνθο», (Ζάκυνθος 1997), Αθήνα 1999, τόμ. Α', 313–326.
- Τσιότρας, Βασίλειος Ι. (1999). Η ανέκδοτη πραγματεία Περί αστρολάβου του Θεοφίλου Κορυδαλλέως.. Ο Ερανιστής. 22. Όμιλος Μελέτης του Ελληνικού Διαφωτισμού: 5–28. doi:10.12681/er.178.
- Τσιότρας, Β. Ι., «Κλαύδιος Πτολεμαίος και Θεόφιλος Κορυδαλλεύς: Τα αστρολογικά κείμενα», Σιναϊτικά Ανάλεκτα, τόμ. Α', Αθήνα 2002, 171–208.
- Tsiotras, V., «The Manuscripts of Theophilos Korydalleus' Commentaries on Aristotle's Logic», Cesare Cremonini: Aspetti del pensiero e scritti, (Atti del Convegno di Studio -Padova, 26-27 Febbraio 1999), Accademia Galileiana di Scienze, Lettere ed Arti, Padova 2000, 219–248.
- Τσιότρας, Βασίλειος Ι. (2003). Τρεις ανέκδοτες επιστολές του Θεοφίλου Κορυδαλλέως και οι αριστοτελικές πηγές τους.. Ο Ερανιστής. 24. Όμιλος Μελέτης του Ελληνικού Διαφωτισμού: 11–27. doi:10.12681/er.2.
- Τσιότρας, Βασίλειος Ι. (2005). Ένα εγχειρίδιο αρχαιοελληνικής μετρικής του 17ου αιώνα.. Ο Ερανιστής. 25. Όμιλος Μελέτης του Ελληνικού Διαφωτισμού: 407–417. doi:10.12681/er.48.
- Κωνσταντίνος Σάθας, Βιογραφίαι των εν τοις γράμμασι διαλαμψάντων Ελλήνων από της καταλύσεως της Βυζαντινής Αυτοκρατορίας μέχρι της Ελληνικής Εθνεγερσίας 1453–1821, εκδ. Κουλτούρα,1990, σελ. 250-254
