= Siege of Salona (1821) =

Military engagement in 1821 during the Greek Revolution

- Part of the Greek War of Independence
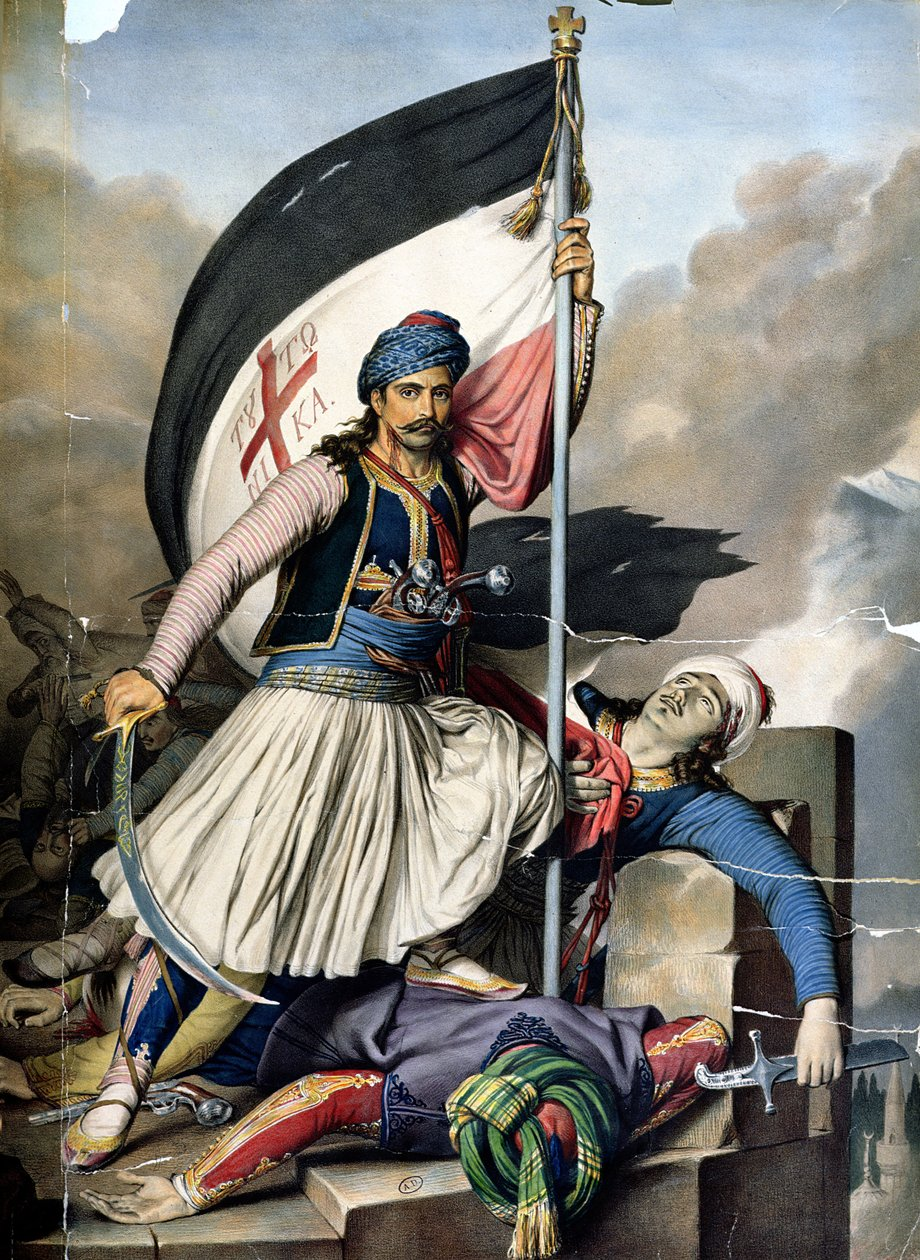
- Nikolas Mitropoulos raises the flag in Salona. (Painting by Louis Dupre)
Date	28 March – 10 April 1821 (1 week and 6 days)
Location	Salona, Phocis, Rumelia Eyalet, Ottoman Empire
Result	Greek victory

Belligerents
Greek revolutionaries	Ottoman Empire

Commanders and leaders
Panourgias; Thanasis Manikas; Giannis Gouras	Panchomios Bey; Agos Mouhourdaros

Strength
100	5,000 women and children and 600 armed men

Casualties and losses
4 dead	13 dead, surrender of the fortress

The siege of Salona was a military engagement of the 1821 revolution aimed at liberating Salona. It lasted from the beginning of the Revolution until April 10 of the same year, 1821.

== The development of events ==
The chieftain (thief and subsequently the chief of the army of Sterea) of the province of Salona was Panourgias, who, initiated into the Filiki Eteria, when Alis was besieged (1820) and notified by a letter from Papaflessas, left Ioannina (where he had been imprisoned for 3 years) and came to Salona.

On March 24, when he learned that Achaia had rebelled, Panourgias was with his 60 men of war (excellently trained and disciplined, with the appearance of a regular military body) at the Monastery of Profitis Hlias, an hour and a half outside Salona. There he called the leaders of the city and the villages and held a general assembly in Galaxidi, at which it was unanimously decided to attack the Turks.

At that meeting, following the invitation of I. Papadiamantopoulos (an envoy of Old Patras Germanos), Odysseas Androutsos, Giannis Gouras and Kontos, the Despotis Isaiah of Salona, etc., attended, among others. Panourgias received, on receipt, 14,000 groschen in order to cover the costs of recruiting fighters. He ordered his son-in-law and deputy commander Thanasis Manikas to recruit in the Vlachochoria all those who could hold a weapon.

He also sent his cousin, Giannis Gouras to Agios Georgios to recruit as well and to come to an agreement with the residents of Galaxidi. After they had agreed, they set out on the night of March 26, arrived at Salona at dawn and besieged the fortress under the leadership of Panourgias. The Turks, who had suspected the Greeks of revolt, had arrived early and locked themselves in the fortress with all the women and children, and with the refugees from Vostitsa who had fled there from the Peloponnese. Among them were 600 armed men.

The Turks were strong, but the Greeks also attacked with momentum, so that they captured the water reserves on the very first day. The besieged were forced by lack of water to set out on April 8 with the aim of capturing a nearby spring, but they failed and 13 were killed, including the brave Chaidas.

After a very close siege, the Turks, deprived of food and water, were forced to surrender after 14 days on April 10, after having previously agreed not to harm them. They came out and handed over their weapons to Panourgias, who received them while sitting in front of the Gate. Those who wanted to and felt safe remained in their homes, while the others all dispersed to the villages. The fortress of Salona was the first to be captured by the Greeks in the Revolution of 1821.

== Sources ==
- Λάμπρος Κουτσονίκας (1863). Γενική ιστορία της ελληνικής επαναστάσεως, Τόμος Α΄. Εν Αθήναις: Εκ του «Ευαγγέλιμου» Δ. Καρακατζάνη.
- Γεώργιος Κρέμος (1839-1926) (1879). Χρονολόγια της Ελληνικής Ιστορίας : προς χρήσιν πάντος φιλομαθούς, ιδία δε των εν τοις γυμνασίοις μαθητών. Εν Αθήναις: Τυπογραφείον Δημητρίου Ιασεμίδου.
- Spyridon Trikoupis: History of Greek Revolution, volume Α, pg. 170 - 172.
