= Bessarion Makris =

Greek scholar and theologian

Bessarion Makris (Greek: Βησσαρίων Μακρής, 1635- 1699) was a Greek scholar and theologian.

He was born in Ioannina, northwestern Greece, center of the 17th-18th century Modern Greek Enlightenment. In 1672 Makris became the head of the Goumas (later known as Balanos) School. He composed a manual named Σταχυολογία (Set of Gleanings), printed in 1686 in Venice. This work introduced new teaching methods with a series of questions and answers on Greek grammar and was considered a create success in Greek education and especially among the schools of Ioannina.

Makris got also involved in various theological discussions with another local scholar, Georgios Sougdouris, who succeeded him as head of the Goumas School in 1683.

At 1699 he published the philosophical work Περί των τριών Αρετών Πίστεως Αγάπης και Ελπίδος (On the three Virtues: Faith, Love and Hope).
