= Cesare Cremonini =

Cesare Cremonini may refer to:

- Cesare Cremonini (musician) (born 1980), Italian singer-songwriter
- Cesare Cremonini (philosopher) (1550–1631), Italian professor of natural philosophy
