= Chrysanthus of Jerusalem =

Greek Orthodox Patriarch of Jerusalem

His Beatitude Chrysanthus of Jerusalem
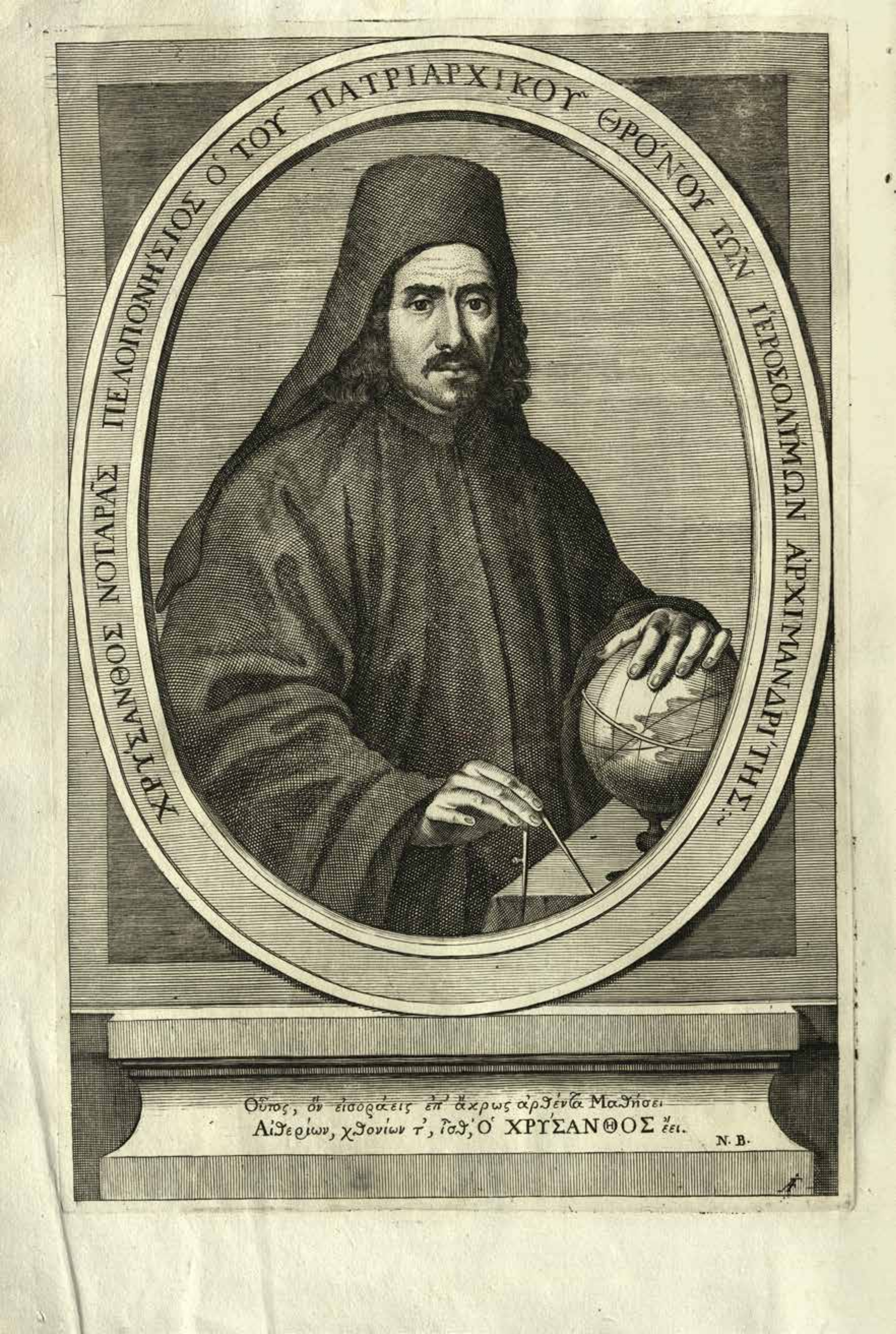

Greek Orthodox Patriarch of Jerusalem
- In office 1707–1731
- Preceded by: Dositheos II Notaras
- Succeeded by: Meletius

Personal details
- Born: Chrysanthus Notaras; 1655 Arachova, Aigialeia, Achaea
- Died: February 7, 1731 (aged 75–76) Jerusalem
- Resting place: Jerusalem
- Scientific career
- Education: University of Padua; Paris Observatory
- Known for: Astronomical Equipment; Cartography; Geometry; Spherics
- Fields: Astronomy, mathematics
- Workplaces: Paris Observatory
- Doctoral advisor: Giovanni Domenico Cassini

Chrysanthus Notaras (Greek: Χρύσανθος Νοταράς; 1655/1660 – February 7, 1731), also known as Chrysanthus of Jerusalem, was Patriarch of Jerusalem (February 19, 1707 – February 7, 1731) and a scholar in Eastern Orthodoxy. He was a mathematician, astronomer, geographer, and author. He is known for creating modern maps in the Greek language. He was one of Giovanni Domenico Cassini's students. He also built astronomical equipment.

== Early life ==
He was born in Arachova, Achaea, in 1655. He was a member of the same family as his predecessor, Dositheos II Notaras and Macarius of Corinth, Metropolitan of Corinth.

== Clerical career ==
Chysanthos Notaras was Patriarch of Jerusalem from 1707 until 1731.

== Scientific and educational career ==
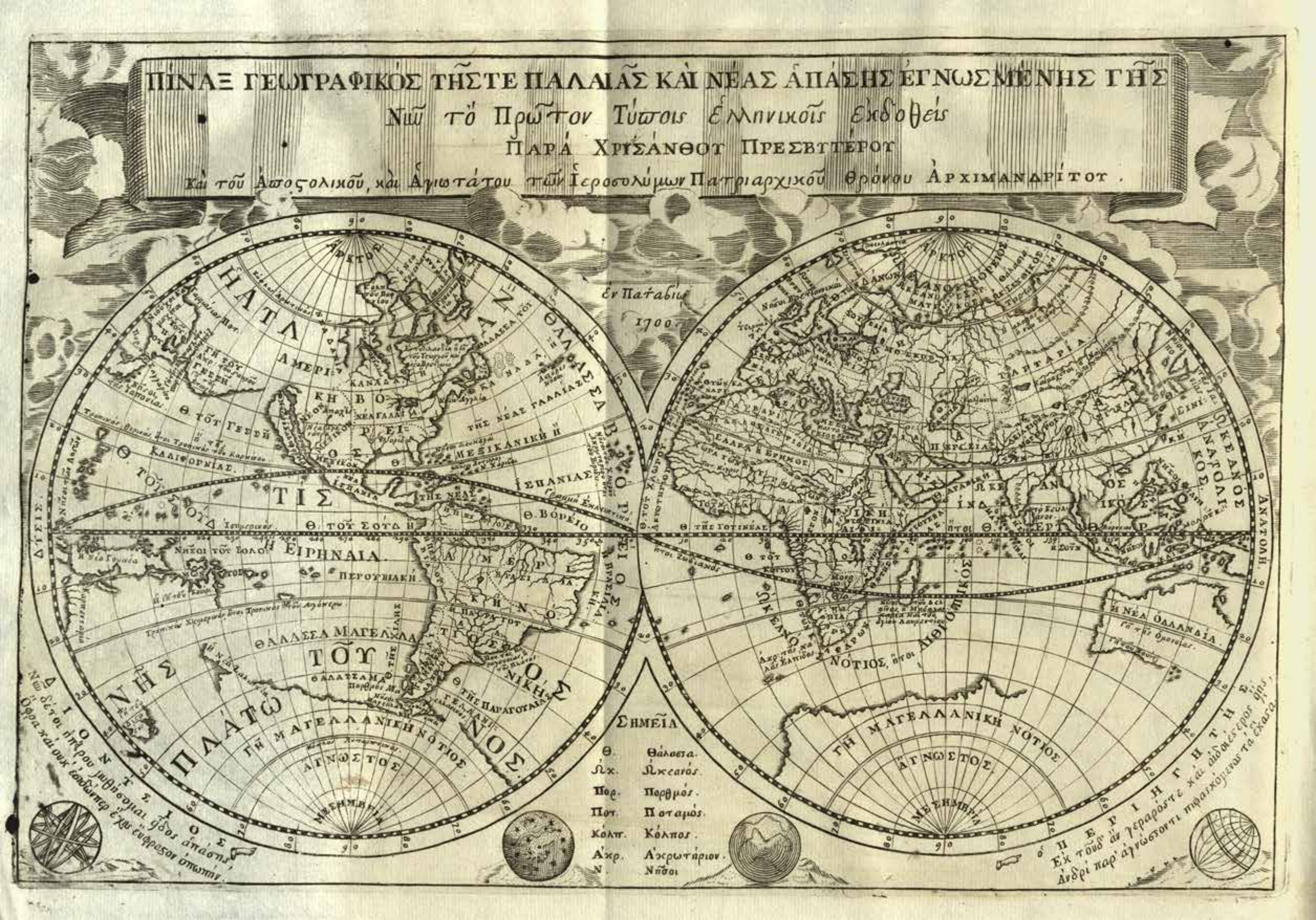
Binakas Geographikos, Crysanthus Notaras, Padova, 1700. The first post-Byzantine map in Greek

He is known for spreading Astronomy in the early eighteenth century. He was one of the most educated Greeks of his time. He was educated in the traditional Orthodox dogma. He learned natural philosophy, mathematics, and theology at the University of Padua. He continued his education in Paris. While in Paris he met liberal theologians, such as Louis Ellies Dupin, Noël Alexandre, and Michel Le Quien. He also met astronomer Giovanni Domenico Cassini. He became his student. He studied Astronomy, Geodesy, and Geography (1700). Cassini was the Director of Paris Observatory. Chrysanthus served as an observer. He also built astronomical instruments, under Cassini's supervision.

Notaras's interests in the mathematical sciences continued throughout his life. His main interests were astronomy and geodesy. He helped create new schools. He believed scientific teaching was important. He promoted formal scientific education. He printed a book called Introduction to Geometry and Spherics. The book did not feature the heliocentric system. He introduced new methods of accuracy in measurement. He was aware of the heliocentric system, although he himself wrote about the geocentric Ptolemaic system following Korydalism. In its opposition to the Copernican system, it does not use theological objections and arguments, but the most substantial objection adopted by scientists during the 16th century. It exposes objectively and over time other views of ancient and modern astronomers as to which system is most suitable for explaining the motions of the planets. He mentions that the Pythagoreans suggested the movement of the Earth and makes special mention of Aristarchus the Samian. Chrysanthos Notaras included an astronomy curriculum at the schools of the Holy Sepulchre.

Both Greek and Italian education was very strict at the time. Korydalism was the only approved education. Heliocentrism was illegal. Galileo's books were on the forbidden list by the Index Librorum Prohibitorum. The Galileo affair and the Greek equivalent, the Methodios Affair were both indications that the church was not ready to accept new ideas. Notaras took many risks but due to his hi-level in the church, he was able to explore scientific advancement much further than Methodios Anthrakites. He did not formally publish a book about the heliocentric system. His book featured diagrams following the heliocentric model. Although the 1758 edition of the Index removed the general prohibition of works advocating heliocentrism, the system did not become accepted in academia until the 19th century.

Chrysanthos was particularly interested in astronomy and astronomical instruments. He procured several astronomical instruments and telescopes from European cities and even built some of them himself.

In 1892, the professor of Mathematics G.A. Arvanitakis, in the olive mill of the monastery where the Theological School of the Cross in Jerusalem was housed discovered a double astrolabe that bore the inscription:

This instrument was made by the monk Chrysanthos under the direction of Cassini for his brothers in Jerusalem, in order to worship God in his works.

== Death ==
He died on February 7, 1731, in Jerusalem.

== Works ==
Books and Articles authored by Chrysanthus of Jerusalem
Date	Title	Title in English
1716	Εισαγωγή Εις τα Γεωγραφικά και Σφαιρικά	Introduction to Geometry and Spherics
1724	Διδασκαλία	Teaching
1728	Ιστορία και Περιγραφή της Αγίας Γής	History and Description of the Holy Land

== See also ==
- Theophilos Corydalleus

Religious titles
Preceded by Dositheos II Notaras	Greek Orthodox Patriarch of Jerusalem; 1707–1731	Succeeded by Meletius
