= Athanasios Psalidas =

Greek scholar (1767–1829)

Athanasios Psalida Αθανάσιος Ψαλίδας (or Ψαλλίδας)
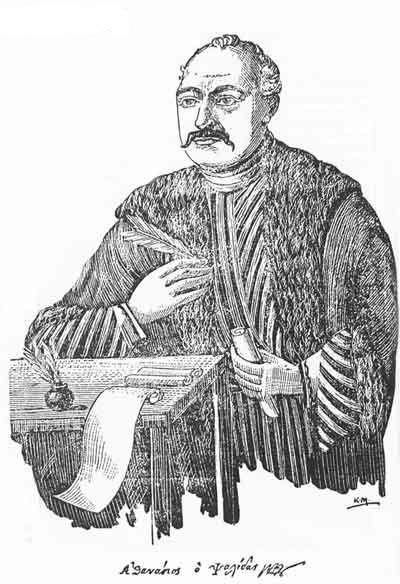
- Born: 1767; Ioannina, Pashalik of Yanina, Ottoman Empire
- Died: 1829 (aged 62); Lefkada, United States of the Ionian Islands, British Empire
- Occupations: novelist, essayist, philosopher
- Known for: Efimeris
- Notable work: Real Bliss

Athanasios Psalidas (Greek: Αθανάσιος Ψαλίδας; 1767–1829), was a Greek author, scholar and one of the most renowned figures of the modern Greek Enlightenment.

== Life ==
=== Early years and diaspora ===
Psalidas was born at 1767 in Ioannina, where he completed ground level education. He continued his studies in Russian Empire (now Ukraine, Poltava) in Poltava Sloviansk Seminary (Note: The seminary was called Poltava Sloviansk Seminary, because it was founded by the bishop of Sloviansk and Kherson, Eugenios Voulgaris.) (1785–1787) and in Austria (1787–1795). In 1791, he published his first work, Real bliss (Αληθής Ευδαιμονία), written in both Greek and Latin. With this work he reestablished fundamental theoretical positions on the existence of God, immortality, afterlife, freedom of man, and the concept of the limits of freedom.

During his studies, Psalidas worked in several Greek editorial companies and printing houses that were established in Vienna, notably the newspaper Ephimeris (Greek: Εφημερίς, "newspaper" in Greek), published in Vienna since 1791. During the same period he published several books. In 1792, together with the Cypriot Ioannis Karatzas, he published the work Love's results (Έρωτος αποτελέσματα), consisting of three romantic stories. This work was subsequently reprinted five times from 1792 to 1836. In 1793, he was interrogated by the Austrian police as suspect of liberal and pro-French revolutionist. Psalidas denied the charges, but his stay in Vienna was unsafe and decided to return to Ottoman-ruled Greece in 1796.

=== Schoolmaster in Ioannina ===
He returned to his native Ioannina, then a prospering city with a large expatriate merchant class and a major cultural center of the Ottoman Greek world. There he became the director of the city's most renowned school, the Maroutsaia School (at that time renamed to Kaplaneios), founded by the bequest of two local merchants, the brothers Lambros and Simon Maroutsis. Psalidas remained at this post for 25 years. During this time he enhanced the school's curriculum by introducing lessons in history, geography, natural sciences, economics and foreign languages. Psalidas also brought with him educational equipment and special instruments in order to teach astronomy and perform a number of chemical and physical experiments. His lessons were not only watched by his students, but also by locals that admired his work. He also equipped the school's library, which was also open to public and hired qualified teaching personnel. Moreover, he offered scholarships to the best of his students.

Psalidas had also to deal with conservative circles, who distrusted and bitterly criticized his innovations and promotion of the "atheist" ideas of Voltaire and many of the ideals of the French Revolution. In refutation of their allegations, he published the work Moves towards progress (Καλοκινήματα). Psalidas had become one of the most distinguished personalities of city of Ioannina. He participated in local courts, councils and was also adviser to Ali Pasha, who also sent him several times to Western Europe in diplomatic missions.

=== Last years ===
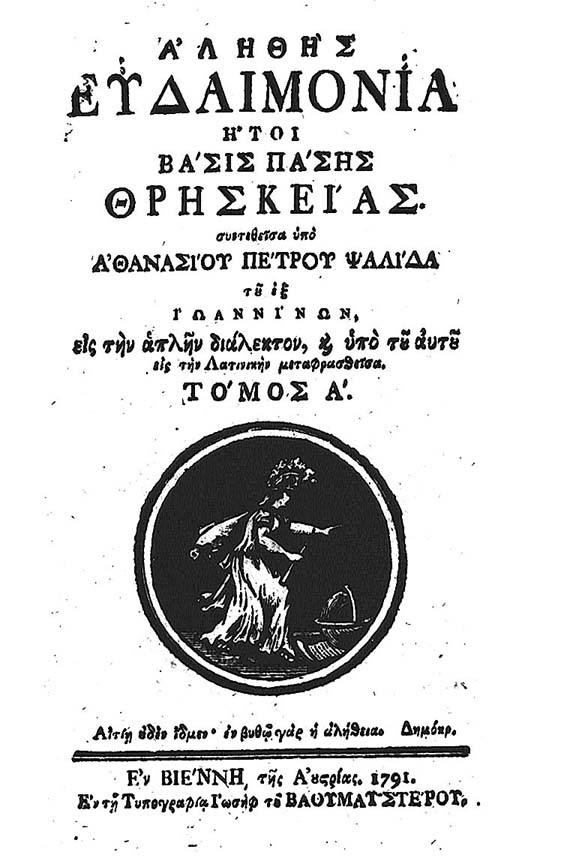
Title page of Αληθής Ευδαιμονία (Real Bliss) Vienna 1791.

Psalidas found refuge in nearby Zagori, when armed conflict between Ali Pasha and the Ottoman Empire broke out (1820–1822).Thereafter he lived in Corfu, where he became doctor of the Ionian Academy, but he was denied the opportunity to teach because of his progressive ideas. Later, he became director of the school of Lefkada, where he died, in 1829.

== Positions on the Greek language question ==
When young, Psalidas adopted an archaist Greek language, but when by the time he had become "the most prominent teacher in Ioannina" he used Demotic Greek. He also disagreed with the position of Adamantios Korais, on the katharevousa (the "purified" language, a mix between archaism and demoticism). He is considered one of the possible authors of the anonymous Hellenic Nomarchy: A Discourse on Freedom (Ελληνική Νομαρχία) and Rossaglogallos (Ρωσαγγλογάλλος).

== Sources ==
- The necessary nation. Gregory Jusdanis. Princeton University Press, 2001. ISBN 978-0-691-08902-7.
- Journal of the history of ideas Project Muse, JSTOR (Organization). Journal of the History of Ideas, Inc., 1960.
- The revival of Greek thought, 1620-1830. George Patrick Henderson. State University of New York Press, 1970. ISBN 978-0-87395-069-5.
- Greeks in Russian military service in the late eighteenth and early nineteenth centuries. Nicholas Charles Pappas. Institute for Balkan Studies, 1991.
