= Eugenios Voulgaris =

Greek Orthodox bishop (1716–1806)

His Eminence Eugenios Voulgaris
- Archbishop of Cherson
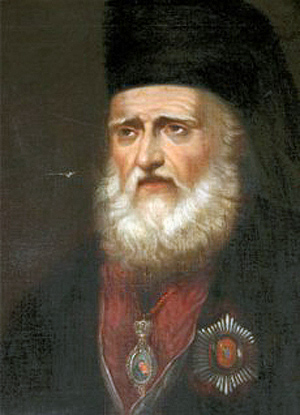

Personal details
- Born: 1716 Corfu, Republic of Venice
- Died: 1806 (aged 89–90) Saint Petersburg, Russian Empire

Eugenios Voulgaris or Boulgaris (Greek: Εὐγένιος Βούλγαρης; Russian: Евгений Вулгарский, Евгений Вулгар; 1716–1806) was a Greek Orthodox cleric, author, educator, mathematician, astronomer, physicist, and philosopher. He wrote about every discipline: legal, historical, theological, grammatical, linguistic, astronomy, political, mathematics, archaeology, music, secularism, euthanasia, and the tides. He wrote speeches, poems, appeals to Catherine II for the liberation of Greece, and hundreds of letters. He edited valuable editions of Byzantine writers and classical books and translated many texts from Latin into French. He was one of the students of Methodios Anthrakites. He translated many important foreign language academic documents to Greek. He was bishop of Cherson (in Crimea). He was a leading contributor to the Modern Greek Enlightenment.

== Youth and education ==
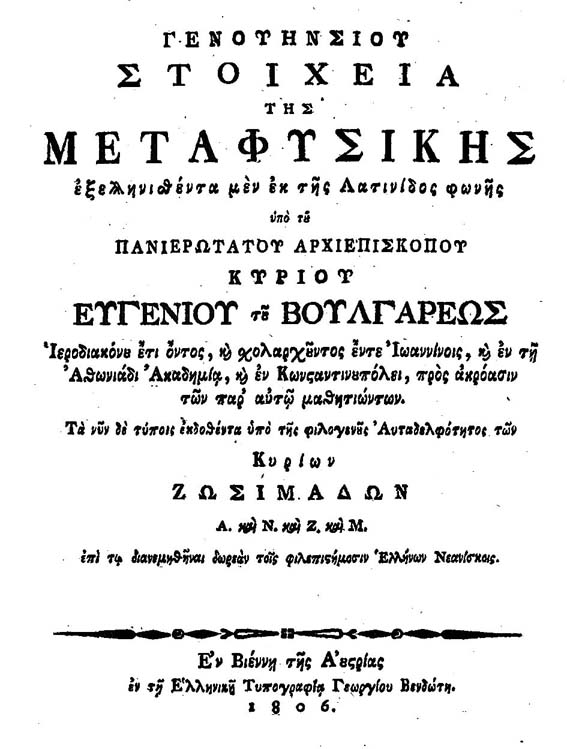
The title page of a metaphysics book by Eugenios Voulgaris, published in Vienna in 1806

He was born on the island of Corfu, ruled by the Republic of Venice at that time, as Eleftherios Vulgares on 10 August 1716. He studied in Corfu under Vikentios Damodos, a scholar, and continued his studies in the School of Ioannina (in western Greece) under Athanasios Psalidas.

In 1737 or 1738 he became a monk and presbyter with the name Eugenios, and afterwards went to the University of Padua to study theology, philosophy, European languages and natural sciences.

== Teacher of the Greek nation ==
In 1742, Boulgaris became director of an important school of Ioannina, the Maroutsaia. There he was involved in a public dispute with Balanos Vasilopoulos, who was the director of another high level school of the city, regarding the curricula of their respective schools – Voulgaris arguing for the institution of natural philosophy.

From 1753 to 1759 Voulgaris was director of the Athonite Academy (Athoniada Akademia) at Vatopedi Monastery aiming at upgrading the level of studies. There he taught philosophy as well as mathematics. Though he was considered one of the most eminent teachers, his eagerness to communicate some of the new ideas of the western European 'Enlightenment' caused a negative reaction among some Orthodox Christian leaders on Mount Athos. He was eventually forced to abandon the school in the beginning of 1759.

He then temporarily headed the Patriarchal Academy in Constantinople (known to Greeks as the "Great School of the Nation"). However, in 1761 he permanently abandoned his educational career.

Although Eugenios was associated by some Orthodox Christians with the unsuccessful attempt to found a Western-style academy on Mt. Athos and at the Patriarchal Academy, he was also a strong opponent of Uniate and Roman Catholic proselytising among other Christians; and in his correspondence with Pierre Leclerc, the French Catholic Jansenist theologian sympathetic to Orthodox Christian traditions, he says that since the time of the Schism Orthodox Christians have been blessed with many saints and martyrs equal to the ancients and with a bounty of miracles: "Our Church is continuously glorified and made wondrous by God, no less after the Schism than before it, and up to our times" (Epistle of Eugenios Voulgaris to Pierre Leclerc, first edition, by Andreas Koromelas [Athens, 1844], p. 68).

== In Russia ==
After his unsuccessful attempts to introduce Enlightenment ideas to the Athonite School and Patriarchal Academy Eugenios accepted the patronage of the Russian Empress Catherine II, and spent the rest of his career in Russia. In 1763 he went to Leipzig and Berlin at the invitation of Empress Catherine. In 1771 he arrived at St. Petersburg, and between 1772 and 1774 worked as a librarian at the court.

In 1775 he was ordained archbishop, and became the first archbishop of the newly created Eparchy (Diocese) of Slaviansk and Cherson. The new diocese included lands of the newly annexed Zaporizhian Sich, which converted into the Novorossiya and Azov Governorates north of the Black Sea, recently conquered by Russia from the Ottoman Crimean Khanate. Along with Russians and Ukrainians, Orthodox Greeks were invited to settle in the region, and the Imperial Government thought it appropriate to appoint a Greek-speaking bishop to preside over the new diocese. Despite its name, the seat of the bishop was in neither Slaviansk (soon to be renamed Nikopol) nor Cherson (Kherson), but in the more centrally located city of Poltava; where the Monastery of the Exaltation of the Cross became the bishop's residence. The following year (1776), Eugenios invited another Corfiot, Nikephoros Theotokis, to join him in Poltava, and started training the younger Greek as his successor. In 1779, Eugenios retired, although he continued to live in the same monastery in Poltava, while Nicephoros took over the diocese.

In 1787 Boulgaris was allowed to move to St. Petersburg. From 1801 until the end of his life the retired bishop lived there in Alexander Nevsky Lavra. In 1788 he was elected a Fellow of the Royal Society.

He died on 12 June 1806, and was buried in the Lavra's Feodorovskaya Church (Fyodorovskaya Tserkov)

== Orthodox Christianity and the Enlightenment ==
The 18th century dawned in the Greek East with Orthodox Christians estranged from both groups of western Christians. While they remained largely uninvolved in dialogue with western Christians until the 19th century, they nevertheless grappled with new intellectual challenges emanating from the west in the form of secular learning. In this period Eugenios Voulgaris was one of the most influential Greek writers. Although he was strictly an Orthodox Christian, he tried to convey the ideas of this western European Enlightenment to Greek Orthodox cultural circles, through translations and teaching of the works of John Locke, Voltaire, and Christian Wolff. Voulgaris' model for the revival and development of learning in Orthodox Christian society included the maintenance of training in the classics combined with an exposure to modern European philosophy.

== Greek language question ==
The discussion on the Greek language question began at the end of the 18th century. Because western Europeans were familiar with, and valued, the ancient Greek language, Eugenios Voulgaris, along with Lambros Photiadis, Stephanos Commitas (1770–1832) and Neophytos Doukas, proposed that the modern Greek language should be archaised and assimilated to Ancient Greek, while his students Iosipos Moisiodax (1725–1800) and Dimitrios Katartzis (c. 1725–1807) preferred the use of the contemporary vernacular language as it had evolved (Dimotiki). This discussion would become crucial when it was to be decided which form should be the official language of the modern Greek state.

The humanist scholar Adamantios Korais (1748–1833) also influenced this discussion. While supporting the language of the people, Korais sought to 'cleanse' it from elements that he considered 'vulgar' and evolved the 'purifying' or Katharevousa forms, which were supposedly set at some midpoint between ancient and contemporary Greek.

== Treatise on euthanasia ==
In his Treatise on Euthanasia (1804), Bishop Eugenios tried to moderate the fear of death by exalting the power of faith and trust in the divine providence, and by presenting death as a universal necessity, a curative physician and a safe harbour. He presented his views in the form of a consoling sermon, enriched with references to classical texts, the Bible and the Church Fathers, as well as to secular sources, including statistics from contemporary Britain and France. Besides euthanasia he introduced terms such as dysthanasia (δυσθανασία), etoimothanasia (ἑτοιμοθανασία) and prothanasia (προθανασία). The Treatise on Euthanasia is one of the first books, if not the very first, devoted to euthanasia in modern European thought, and a remarkable text for the study of developing attitudes towards "good death". In the Treatise 'euthanasia' is clearly meant as a spiritual preparation and reconciliation with dying rather than the physician-related mercy-killing that the term came to mean during the 19th and the 20th centuries. This text has been studied not only by the historian of medical or religious ethics, but by many trying to confront death, in private or professional settings.

== Literary works ==
- Logic (Λογική; Loghiki), Leipzig, 1766.
- Treatise on Religious Toleration (Σχεδίασμα περὶ Ἀνεξιθρησκείας; Schediasma peri anexithreskeias), 1767.
- Treatise on Euthanasia, St Petersburg, 1804.
- Elements of Metaphysics, Venice, 1805.
- What Philosophers Prefer, Vienna, 1805.
- About the Universe, Vienna, 1805.
- He also translated (but did not publish) the works of the late 17th-century figures:
  - John Locke (1632–1704),
  - Christian Wolff (1679–1754),
  - Voltaire (1694–1778),
  - Du Hamel (1624–1706), and
  - Edmond Pourchot (1651–1734).

== See also ==
- Diafotismos
- Age of Enlightenment

== Sources ==
- Galanakis, E., and I. D. K. Dimoliatis. "Early European attitudes towards "good death": Eugenios Voulgaris, Treatise on euthanasia, St Petersburg, 1804." Journal of Medical Ethics. 33.6 (June 2007): S1(4).
- Eugenios Voulgaris Bibliography at 18th Century Bibliography.
- Eugene Bulgaris, Archbishop of Cherson at St. Pachomius Library.
- Towards the Revolution: Inspired Absolutism: Reforms
- Michael Angold (Ed.). Eastern Christianity. The Cambridge History of Christianity. Cambridge University Press, 2006.
- Dimitris Dialetis, Costas Gavroglu and Manolis Patiniotis (Univ. of Athens). The Sciences in the Greek Speaking Regions during the 17th and 18th Centuries, in "The Sciences at the Periphery of Europe During the 18th Century'’, Archimedes, Vol. 2, 1997, Kluwer Academic Publishers.
- Constantine Cavarnos. Orthodox Tradition and Modernism. Transl. from the Greek by Patrick G. Barker. Center for Traditionalist Orthodox Studies, Etna, California, 1992.
- As of 23 October 2009, this article is derived in whole or in part from Orthodox Wiki. The copyright holder has licensed the content in a manner that permits reuse under CC BY-SA 3.0 and GFDL. All relevant terms must be followed. The original text was at "Eugenios Voulgaris"
