= Georgios Sougdouris =

Greek philosopher and theologian

Georgios Sougdouris (Greek: Γεώργιος Σουγδουρής; 1645/7–1725) was a Greek philosopher and theologian.

== Biography ==
Sougdouris was born in Ioannina then part of the Ottoman Empire, where he finished ground level studies. He continued his studies at the University of Venice and in Padua where he may have attended courses at the local university. In 1681, Sougdouris became a priest. Two years later, he became the head of the Goumas School in Ioannina (a.k.a. Gioumeios or Gioumas School), succeeding Bessarion Makris. There, he taught natural sciences, mathematics and Aristotelian philosophy. Sougdouris taught at the Goumas school until 1710, and was succeeded by Methodios Anthrakites. He wrote a number of philological, theological and philosophical works like Εισαγωγή Λογική (Introduction to Logic), published in Vienna, 1792 and Επιτομή Γραμματικής (Concise Grammar), both were extensively used as school textbooks. Moreover, he translated into Greek the work of Francesco Panigarola Rhetorica Ecclesiastica.

Sougdouris got involved in various theological discussions with local scholars. Due to his progressive views and teaching methods, he got into conflict with conservative circles and was accused of atheism. As a result, the local Orthodox bishop asked for Sougdouris' excommunication but failed.
