= Balanos Vasilopoulos =

Greek mathematician and author

The Reverend Kosmas Balanos
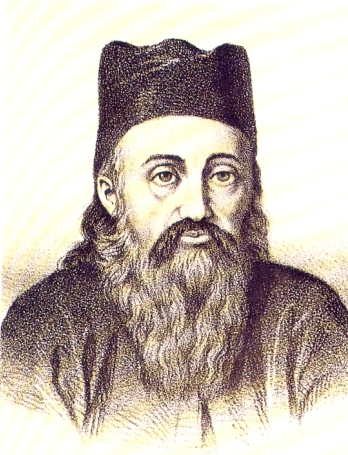
- Born: 1694; Ioannina, Epirus, Ottoman Empire
- Died: 1760 (aged 65–66); Ioannina, Epirus, Ottoman Empire
- Scientific career
- Fields: Mathematician
- Workplaces: Gouma (or Balaneios) School

Balanos Vasilopoulos (Greek: Μπαλάνος Βασιλόπουλος; 1694–1760) was a Greek Orthodox cleric, author, mathematician, physicist, and philosopher. He is known for attempting to solve doubling the cube. He was one of the most influential Greek mathematicians of the 18th century. His teacher was the notable scientist Methodios Anthrakites. He made a significant contribution to the Modern Greek Enlightenment during the Ottoman occupation of the Greek world.

== Life ==
Balanos was born in Ioannina, a major center of the Greek Enlightenment movement during that time. He was a student of Methodios Anthrakites director of the local Gouma (later Balaneios) school. As a teacher, he initially became director of the school Epifaneios Igoumenos (1719–1734) and then the Gouma. Both schools were the most prestigious in Ioannina.

Regarding the Greek language question, he supported the conservative party and teaching classical Greek in education. Eugenios Voulgaris accused Balanos of not supporting the progressive Demotic. In ca. 1760 his son Kosmas Balanos succeeded him as schoolmaster of the Gouma School.

== Work ==
Because he experienced the Methodios Affair first hand he was a strict teacher of Korydalism. On the other hand, he expanded and reprinted the work of his teacher Methodios Anthrakites The Way of Mathematics (Greek: Οδός Μαθηματική, 1749). This was the first handbook in the field of mathematics published in Greek during the Ottoman occupation. He also wrote the following, and various other books of less significance:

- Έκθεσις ακριβεστάτη της αριθμητικής (Precise Exposition of Arithmetic), Venice, 1803
- Ερμηνεία εις τους αφορισμούς του Ιπποκράτους (Interpretation of the Aphorisms of Hippocrates)

Balanos claimed to have solved the problem of doubling the cube, i.e. finding the cube root of 2 using ruler and compasses. He published this in Venice in 1756, and attempted to gain international recognition for his solution from the community of mathematicians, and in particular Leonhard Euler and the members of the Saint Petersburg Academy of Sciences. His son Kosmas Balanos rejected the solution in a work published in 1816 after his own death, Αντιπελάργησις (Antipelargisis, Against the Stork). The problem was later proved to be impossible.
