= Vlachochoria =

The Vlachochoria (Gr. Βλαχοχώρια, from Vlach and chorio (village)) is a general toponym in Greece for villages inhabited by Vlach-speakers. It may refer to one of the following:

- The villages Syrrako and Kalarrytes and surrounding settlements on the western Pindus, Epirus.

During the Ottoman period these two villages consisted an autonomous federation. In 18th and 19th centuries were formidable for their textile and jewellery craftsmanship as well as a cultural and education centre. Both were destroyed by Ali Pasha in 1821 because they revolted against him.

- Villages in Doris. They participated in the events of March 25, 1821, on the outbreak of the Greek War of Independence against the Ottoman Empire.
