= Modern Greek Enlightenment =

18th-century national revival and educational movement in Greece

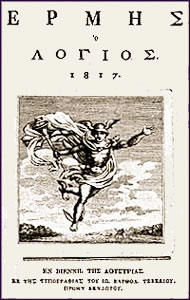
Hermes o Logios, Greek literary magazine of the 18th and 19th century

The Modern Greek Enlightenment (also known as the Neo-Hellenic Enlightenment; Greek: Διαφωτισμός, Diafotismós / Νεοελληνικός Διαφωτισμός, Neoellinikós Diafotismós) was the Greek expression of the Age of Enlightenment, characterized by an intellectual and philosophical movement within the Greek community. At this time, many Greeks were dispersed across the Ottoman Empire, with some residing on the Ionian Islands, in Venice, and other parts of Italy. Leonardos Philaras, one of the early advocates for Greek independence, played a significant role before the movement truly gained momentum following his death.

Throughout the Ottoman Empire, Greeks frequently participated in uprisings. Many Greeks living in Venice fought for the Venetian Empire against the Ottomans. Notable Greek painters in Venice who took part in these conflicts included Victor (painter), Philotheos Skoufos, and Panagiotis Doxaras. During the Modern Greek Enlightenment, Greek painting underwent a significant transformation. The traditional Byzantine-Venetian style, which had been dominant in the Cretan School, began to wane in favor of the Heptanese School's new approach. Painters like Doxaras pioneered this shift, moving away from the egg tempera technique and embracing oil painting, thus revolutionizing Greek art.

The educational center for the Greek community was Italy where many of the priests were educated and the leadership of the Rum Millet was controlled by Orthodox Christian priests. The education of the Greek community was subjugated by a strict observance of Korydalism which was taught by priests and sanctioned by the Catholic and Orthodox churches. Korydalism was created by Theophilos Corydalleus and it followed Aristotle and Plato's secular philosophical teachings. A central figure in the schism from Korydalism was Methodios Anthrakites who fought to introduce updated European philosophical thought to Greek education. He was persecuted in Constantinople by the church fathers and a debate ensued among Greek scholars during the later part of the 18th century to change education. Nonetheless, Greek priest and astronomer Chrysanthus of Jerusalem had an active relationship with Giovanni Domenico Cassini.

The American War of Independence sent shockwaves throughout the world and most people demanded liberty or death. Between the date of American independence and the dawn of the Greek War of Independence roughly eleven countries in Europe and the Americas fought for independence, from the Haitian Revolution in 1791 to the Peruvian War of Independence in 1811. The Pamphlet of Rigas Feraios, published in 1797, was an instrument to awaken Greek national consciousness which led to the Greek War of Independence. Another important pamphlet was Hellenic Nomarchy published in 1806 and advocated the ideals of freedom, social justice, and social equality for the Greek people. By 1814, the Filiki Eteria (Society of Friends) formed in Odessa, whose purpose was to overthrow the Ottoman rule of Greece and establish an independent Greek State. Another society called the Philomuse Society was formed with the aim of educating the Greeks and promoting philhellenism.

Eventually, the Greek community fought in the Greek War of Independence for roughly nine years. By the 1830s, the enlightenment struggle continued and the Greek community established a state that was still overshadowed by Orthodox ecclesiastical aristocracy. Orthodox priest Neophytos Vamvas was the dean of the scientific and philosophical school of Athens. Eventually for the proliferation of the people a secular state was preferred and Otto of Greece was elected King. Greek academics studied in Germany and France and a German educational system was implemented in Greece. The major new architecture of Athens was Neoclassical in nature and was a defining characteristic of the Greek Enlightenment and Greek painters represented the Munich School. The Enlightenment movement continued with news of continued Greek oppression among the Greek community living in the Ottoman Empire.

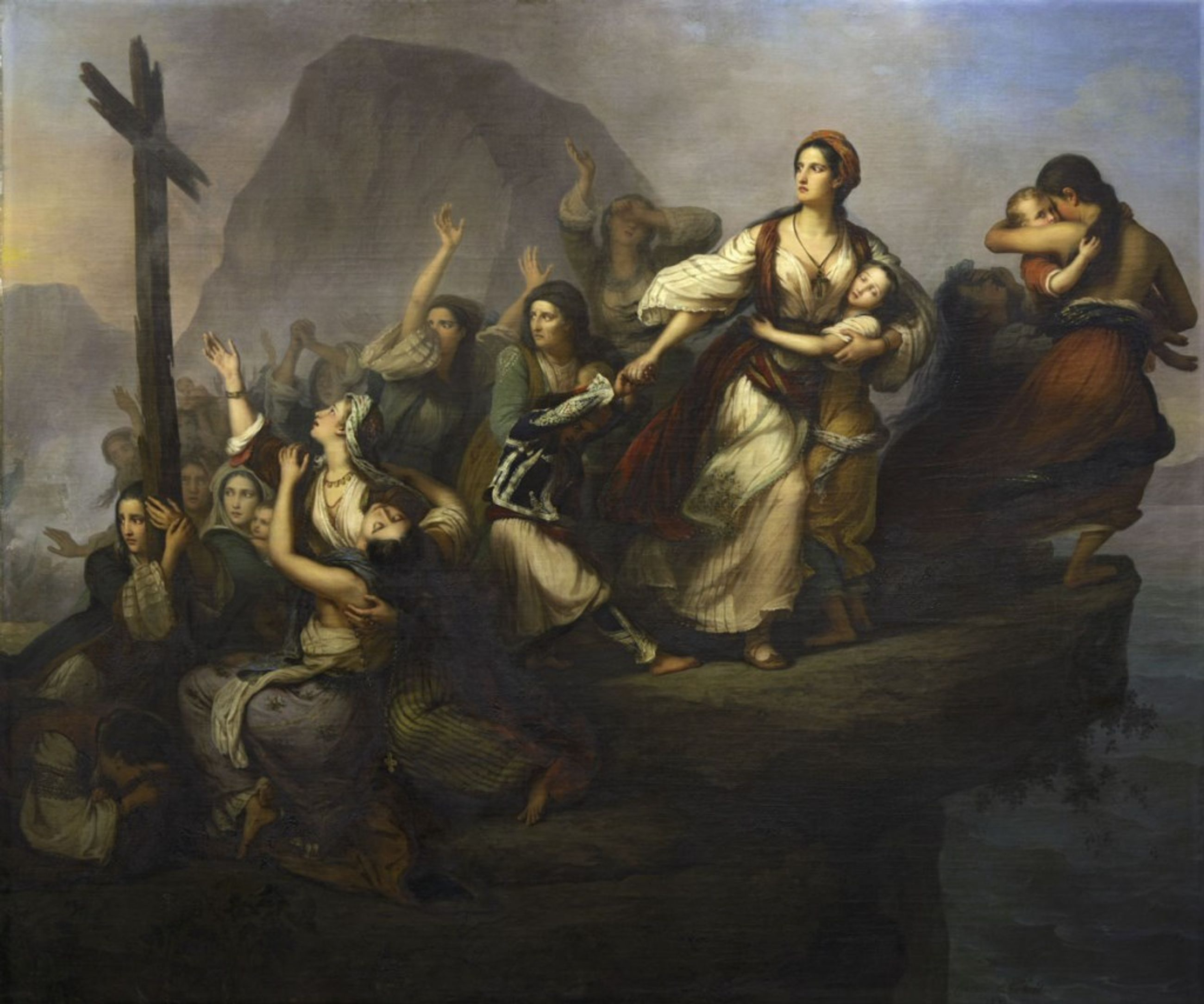
Greek Women of Souli Running to Their Death (Dance of Zalongo)

Regrettably, slavery still overshadowed the Greek people living in the empire. The Greek slave movement began in the United States with Garafilia Mohalbi and people learned about the horrors of Greek slavery. Eventually Hiram Powers sculpted The Greek Slave statue which was exhibited all over the world. The Dance of Zalongo also became a popular movement in art during the Greek Enlightenment and reminded people of the mass suicide of roughly 60 women and children from a cliff in Zalongo in 1803 to avoid capture, enslavement, rape and lifelong torture by Ottoman forces during the Souliote War (1803). The Ottomans implemented the Tanzimat reforms to slow nationalistic sentiment but Greek oppression continued until they were fully liberated and wars ensued for over 100 years. Rhodes, together with the other islands of the Dodecanese, were united with Greece in February 1947.

== Origins ==
The Greek Enlightenment was given impetus by the Greek predominance in trade and education in the Ottoman Empire. This allowed Greek merchants to finance a large number of young Greeks to study in universities in Italy and the German states. There, they were introduced to the ideas of the Enlightenment and the French Revolution. It was the wealth of the extensive Greek merchant class that provided the material basis for the intellectual revival that was the prominent feature of Greek life in the half century and more leading to 1821. It was not by chance that on the eve of the Greek War of Independence the epicenters of Greek learning, i.e. schools-cum-universities, were situated in Ioannina, Chios, Smyrna (Izmir) and Ayvalık (Kydonies), were also Greek commercial centers.

=== Role of the Phanariotes ===
The Phanariotes were a small caste of Greek families who took their collective name from the Phanar quarter of Constantinople where the Ecumenical Patriarchate is still housed. They held various administrative posts within the Ottoman Empire, the most important of which were those of hospodar, or prince, of the Danubian principalities of Moldavia and Wallachia. Most hospodars acted as patrons of Greek culture, education, and printing. These academies attracted teachers and pupils from throughout the Orthodox commonwealth, and there was some contact with intellectual trends in Habsburg central Europe. For the most part they supported the Ottoman system of government, too much to play a significant part in the emergence of the Greek national movement; however, their support of learning produced many highly educated Greek scholars who benefited from the cosmopolitan environment the Phanariotes cultivated in their principalities.

This environment was in general a special attraction for young, ambitious and educated Greek people from the Ottoman Empire, contributing to their national enlightenment. The Princely Academies of Bucharest and Iasi also played a crucial role in this movement. Characteristically the authors of the Geographia Neoteriki, one of the most remarkable works of that era, Daniel Philippidis and Grigorios Konstantas, were both educated in this environment.

== Aftermath ==
One effect was the creation of an atticized form of Greek by linguistic purists, which was adopted as the official language of the state and came to be known as Katharevousa (purified). This created diglossia in the Greek linguistic sphere, in which Katharevousa and the vernacular idiom known as Dimotiki were in conflict until the latter half of the 20th century.

The transmission of Enlightenment ideas into Greek thought also influenced the development of a national consciousness. The publication of the journal Hermes o Logios encouraged the ideas of the Enlightenment. The journal's objective was to advance Greek science, philosophy and culture. Two of the main figures of the Greek Enlightenment, Rigas Feraios and Adamantios Korais, encouraged Greek nationalists to pursue contemporary political thought.

The Greek Enlightenment concerned not only language and the humanities but also the sciences. Some scholars such as Methodios Anthrakites, Evgenios Voulgaris, Athanasios Psalidas, Balanos Vasilopoulos and Nikolaos Darbaris had a background in mathematics and the Physical Sciences and published scientific books into Greek for use in Greek schools. Rigas Feraios also published an Anthology of Physics.

== Art ==
The Greek Enlightenment also included the art of the Heptanese School. Notable artists of the Greek Enlightenment in art include: Panagiotis Doxaras, Nikolaos Doxaras, Nikolaos Kantounis, Nikolaos Koutouzis and Gerasimos Pitsamanos. Greek art began to diverge from the traditional Maniera Greca drastically migrating to the Venetian Maniera Italiana. The art began to exhibit its own style. Greek painting eras include the Greek Rocco, Greek Neoclassicism and Greek Romanticism. The movements carried Greek artists into the era of Modern Greek Art. Most historians refer to this period as the Neo Hellenikos Diafotismos in painting.

There were many artists associated with the era that were not from the Ionian Islands. These artists were in different parts of the Ottoman Empire or Venetian Empire. Some artists were active in the Cyclades such Christodoulos Kalergis and Emmanuel Skordilis. Ioannis Koronaros migrated from Crete to Egypt and finally settled in Cyprus. Although the Cretan Renaissance ended, there were still few active workshops on the island. Many of these artists belonged to the Neo Hellinkos Diafotismos.

The Modern Greek Enlightenment in Art did not only belong to the Heptanese School but all of the Greek communities or the so-called ancestors of Ancient Greek Civilization. This group lived throughout what is now considered modern Greece. There were also countless Greek artists active in Constantinople, now called Istanbul. Research is constantly underway by the Neohellenic Institute, hundreds of Greek painters and other artists have been cataloged from the 15th century until the Greek War of Independence.

== Notable people and societies ==
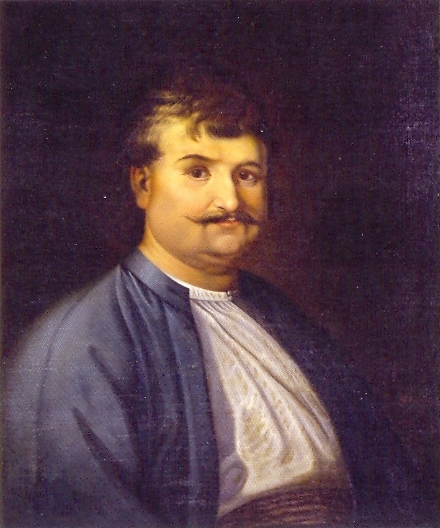
Rigas Feraios

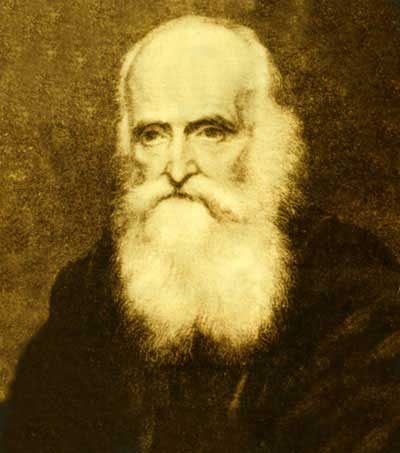
Theophilos Kairis

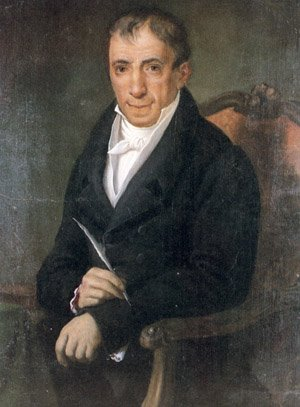
Adamantios Korais

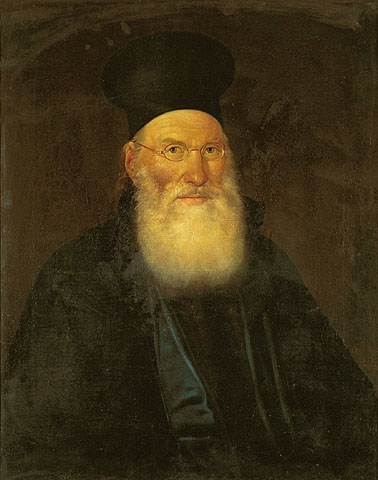
Theoklitos Farmakidis

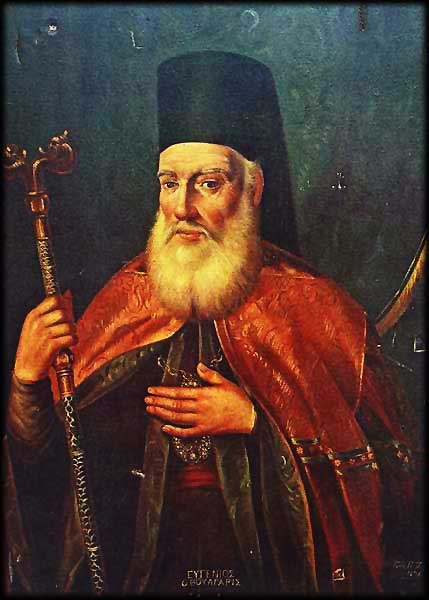
Eugenios Voulgaris

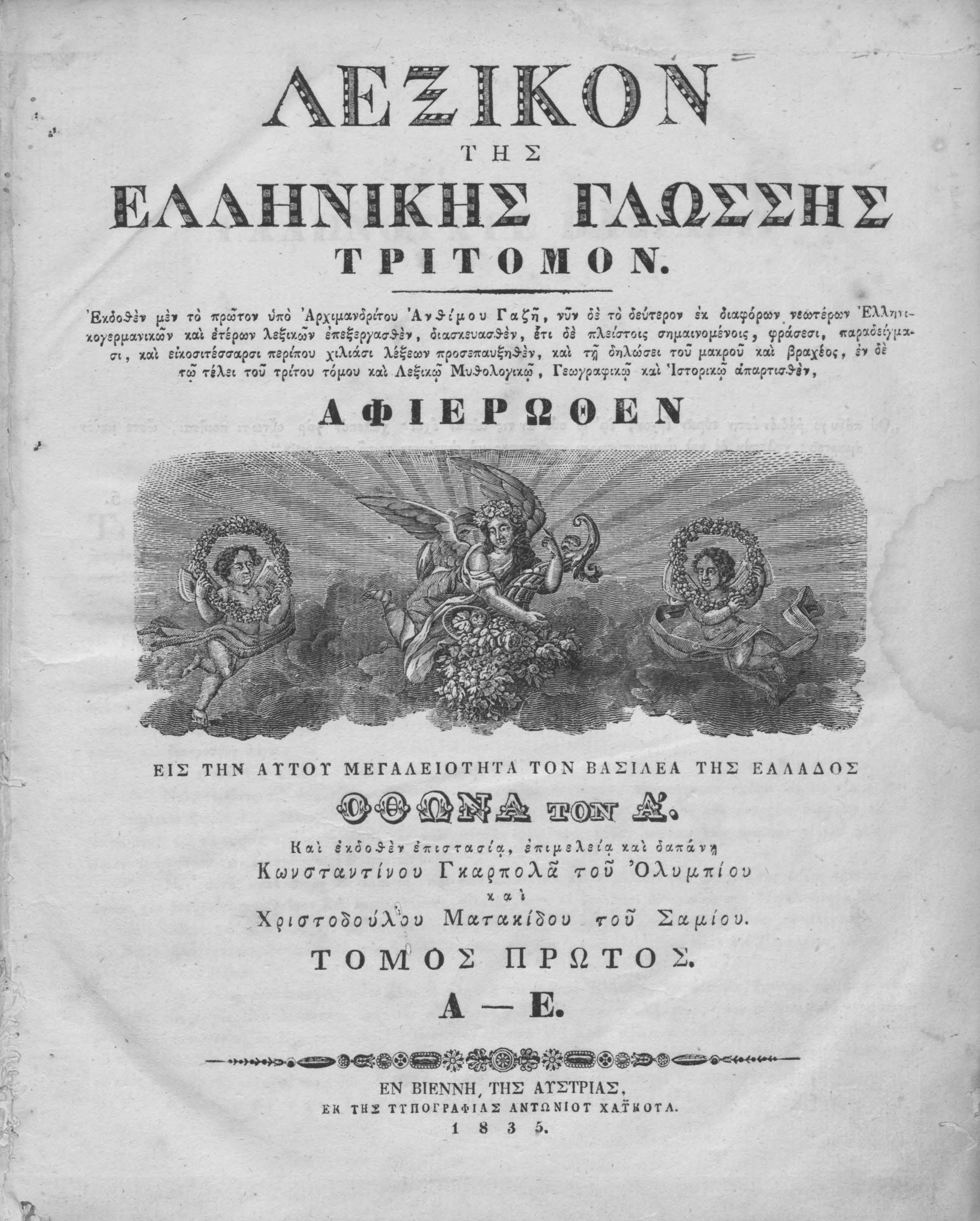
Greek Language Dictionary (1835 edition) by Anthimos Gazis
- Neophytos Doukas (1760–1845), a scholar and prolific writer, who wrote about 70 books and rendered many ancient texts into Modern Greek.
- Rigas Feraios, Greek emigre to Vienna. He was an admirer of the French Revolution and hoped to transplant its humanistic ideas to the Greek world. He imagined a pan-Balkan uprising against the Ottomans.
- Adamantios Korais, witness of the French Revolution, Korais took his primary intellectual inspiration from the Enlightenment, and he borrowed ideas copiously from the philosophers Thomas Hobbes, John Locke and Jean-Jacques Rousseau.
- Theophilos Kairis, influenced by the French Enlightenment and critical to the Eastern Orthodox Church. He founded a pietistic revivalist movement, known as Theosebism, inspired by the French revolutionary cults, radical Protestantism and deism which was anathematised by the Synod of the Patriarchate of Constantinople. He had a very different vision for the independent Greece, one that was based upon the concept of separation of church and state.
- Theoklitos Farmakidis, inspired by the French Revolution, strongly pro-West and critical to the Ecumenical Patriarchate of Constantinople.
- Filomousos Eteria, the name of two (Athens and Vienna) philological and philhellene organizations.
- Filiki Eteria, the Society of Friends in Greek, was a secret society working in the early 19th century, whose purpose was to overthrow Ottoman rule and to establish an independent Greek state founded on the humanist ideals of the Enlightenment. Many young Phanariot Greeks were among its members.

== See also ==
- Ellinoglosso Xenodocheio

== Bibliography ==
- Speake, Graham (2021). Modern Greek Enlightenment Encyclopedia of Greece and the Hellenic Tradition. London And New York: Rutledge Taylor & Francis Group. ISBN 9781135942069.
- Kitromilides, Paschalis M. (2013). Enlightenment and Revolution The Making of Modern Greece. Cambridge, MA: Harvard University Press. ISBN 9780674727663.
- Ricks, David; Beaton, Roderick (2016). The Making of Modern Greece Nationalism, Romanticism, and the Uses of the Past (1797–1896). New York, NY: Taylor & Francis. ISBN 9781317024736.
- Pizanias, Petros T. (2020). The Making of the Modern Greeks 1400-1820. Cambridge, UK: Cambridge Scholars Publishing. ISBN 9781527562486.
- Hatzidakis, Manolis (1987). Έλληνες Ζωγράφοι μετά την Άλωση (1450-1830). Τόμος 1: Αβέρκιος - Ιωσήφ [Greek Painters after the Fall of Constantinople (1450-1830). Volume 1: Averkios - Iosif]. Athens: Center for Modern Greek Studies, National Research Foundation. hdl:10442/14844. ISBN 960-7916-01-8.
- Hatzidakis, Manolis; Drakopoulou, Evgenia (1997). Έλληνες Ζωγράφοι μετά την Άλωση (1450-1830). Τόμος 2: Καβαλλάρος - Ψαθόπουλος [Greek Painters after the Fall of Constantinople (1450-1830). Volume 2: Kavallaros - Psathopoulos]. Athens: Center for Modern Greek Studies, National Research Foundation. hdl:10442/14088. ISBN 960-7916-00-X.
- Drakopoulou, Evgenia (2010). Έλληνες Ζωγράφοι μετά την Άλωση (1450–1830). Τόμος 3: Αβέρκιος - Ιωσήφ [Greek Painters after the Fall of Constantinople (1450–1830). Volume 3: Averkios - Joseph]. Athens, Greece: Center for Modern Greek Studies, National Research Foundation. ISBN 978-960-7916-94-5.
- Israel, Jonathan I. (2006). Enlightenment Contested Philosophy, Modernity, and the Emancipation of Man 1670-1752. Oxford, UK: Oxford University Press. ISBN 9780199279227.
- McGuckin, John Anthony, ed. (2011). "Philosophy". The Encyclopedia of Eastern Orthodox Christianity. A-M. Vol. 1. West Sussex, United Kingdom: Wiley Blackwell. ISBN 978-1-118-75933-2.
- Plested, Marcus (2012). Orthodox Readings of Aquinas. Oxford, UK: Oxford University Press. ISBN 9780199650651.
- Stefanidou, Micheal K. (1952). Εθνικόν και Καποδιστριακόν Πανεπιστήμιον Αθηνών Εκατονταετηρίς 1837-1937 Ιστορία της Φυσικομαθηματικής Σχολής [National and Kapodistrian University of Athens Centenary 1837-1937 History of the Faculty of Physics and Mathematics] (PDF). Athens, Greece: National and Kapodistrian University of Athens.
- Savaidou, Irini Mergoupi (2010). Δημόσιος Λόγος περί Επιστήμης στην Ελλάδα, 1870–1900: Εκλαϊκευτικά Εγχειρήματα στο Πανεπιστήμιο Αθηνών, στους Πολιτιστικούς Συλλόγους και στα Περιοδικά [Public Discourse about Science in Greece, 1870-1900: Population Projects at the University of Athens, in Cultural Associations and Magazines] (PDF). Athens, GR: Department of History and Philosophy of Science of the University of Athens. Archived (PDF) from the original on March 13, 2024.
