= Adamantios Korais =

Greek humanist scholar (1748–1833)

- Ἀδαμάντιος Κοραῆς
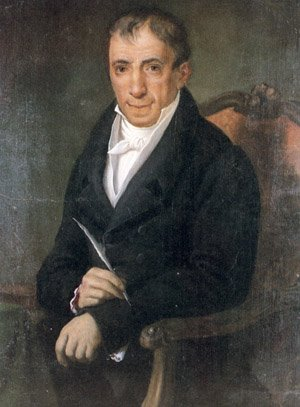
- Adamantios Korais (1748–1833)
- Born: 27 April 1748; Smyrna, Ottoman Empire (modern İzmir, Turkey)
- Died: 6 April 1833 (aged 84); Paris, Kingdom of France

Education
- Education: University of Montpellier (MBBS, 1786; MD, 1787)

Philosophical work
- Era: Age of Enlightenment
- School: Liberalism, Modern Greek Enlightenment
- Main interests: Political philosophy, philology, history, freedom of religion, separation of church and state, Greek language, Greek Independence

Adamantios Korais or Koraïs (Greek: Ἀδαμάντιος Κοραῆς [aðaˈmandi.os koraˈis]; Latin: Adamantius Coraes; French: Adamance Coray; 27 April 1748 – 6 April 1833) was a Greek scholar, who is credited with laying the foundations of modern Greek literature. He was a major figure in the Greek Enlightenment. His activities paved the way for the Greek War of Independence and the emergence of a purified form of the Greek language, known as Katharevousa. Encyclopædia Britannica asserts that "his influence on the modern Greek language and culture has been compared to that of Dante on Italian and Martin Luther on German".

== Life and views ==
Korais was born in Smyrna, in 1748. His father Ioannis, of Chian descent, was demogérontas in Smyrna, a seat similar to the prokritoi of mainland Greece, but elected by the Greek community of the town and not imposed by the Ottomans.

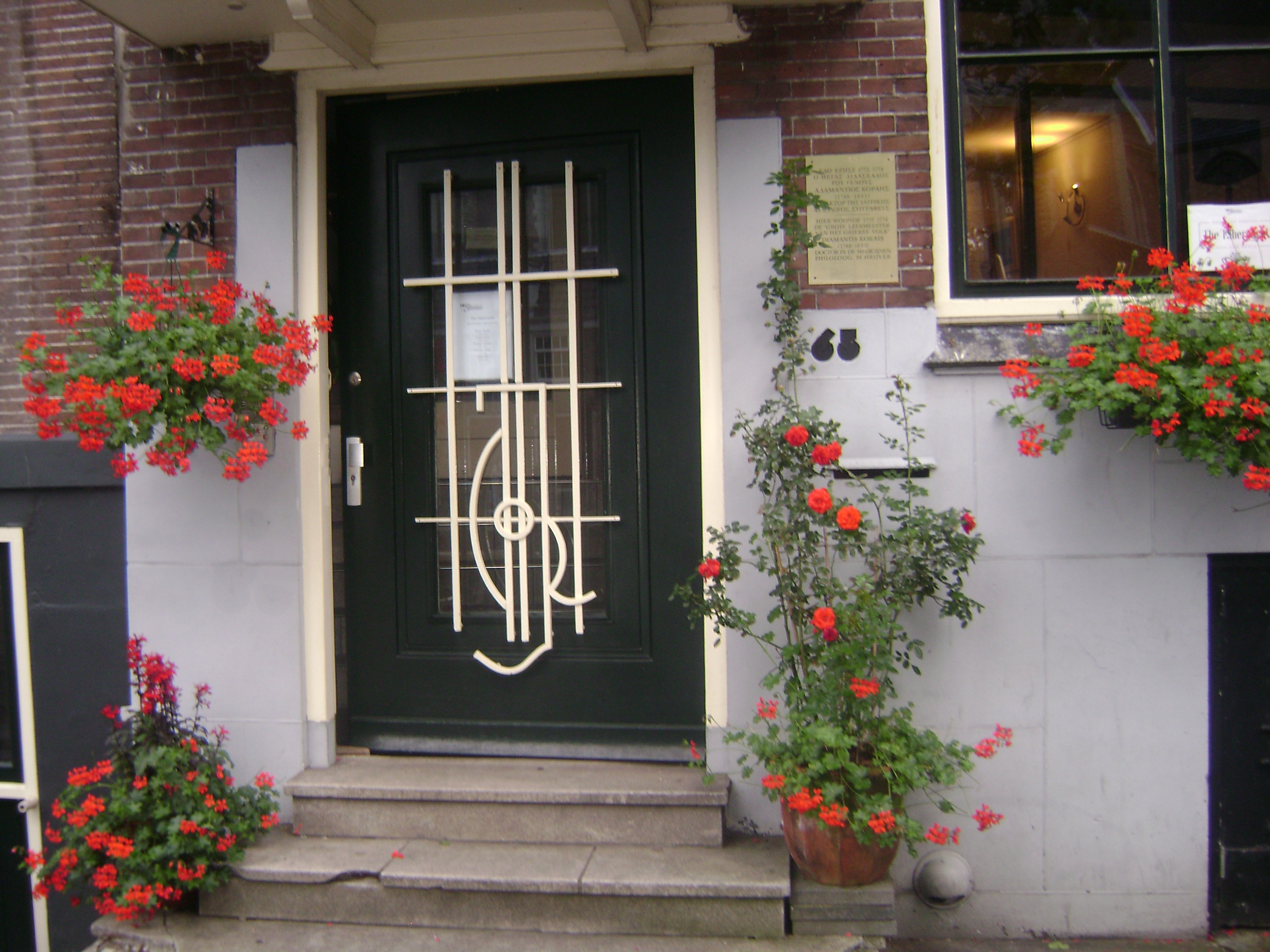
Residence of Korais in Amsterdam

He was exceptionally passionate about philosophy, literacy and linguistics and studied greatly throughout his youth. He initially studied in his hometown, Smyrna, where he graduated from the Evangelical Greek School.

After his school years, he lived in Amsterdam for a while as a merchant, but soon decided that he wanted to study in a university. He also studied Hebrew, Dutch, French and English apart from his knowledge of ancient Greek and Latin.

Korais studied at the school of medicine of the University of Montpellier from 1782 to 1787. His 1786 diploma thesis was entitled Pyretologiae Synopsis, while his 1787 doctoral thesis was entitled Medicus Hippocraticus.

He traveled to Paris where he would continue his enthusiasm for knowledge. There he decided to translate ancient Greek authors and produced thirty volumes of those translations, being one of the first modern Greek philologists and publishers of ancient Greek literature.

After 1788 he was to spend most of his life as an expatriate in Paris. As classical scholar, Korais was repelled by the Byzantine influence on Greek society and was a fierce critic of the lack of education amongst the clergy and their subservience to the Ottoman Empire, although he conceded it was the Orthodox Church that preserved the national identity of Greeks.

Korais believed Western Europe was the heir of the ancient Greek civilization, which had to be transmitted to the modern Greeks through education. Additionally, he advocated the restoration and use of the term "Hellene" (Έλληνας) or "Graikos" (Γραικός) as an ethnonym for the Greeks, in the place of Romiós, that was seen negatively by him.

While in Paris, he was witness to the French Revolution. He was influenced by the revolutionary and liberal sentiments of his age. He admired Thomas Jefferson and exchanged political and philosophical thoughts with the American statesman. A typical man of the Enlightenment, Korais encouraged wealthy Greeks to open new libraries and schools throughout Greece. Korais believed that education would ensure not only the achievement of independence but also the establishment of a proper constitution for the newly liberated Greek state. He envisioned a democratic Greece, recapturing the glory of the Golden Age of Pericles.

Korais died in Paris aged 84 soon after publishing the first volume of his autobiography. In 1877, his remains were transferred to Greece to be buried there.

== Publications ==
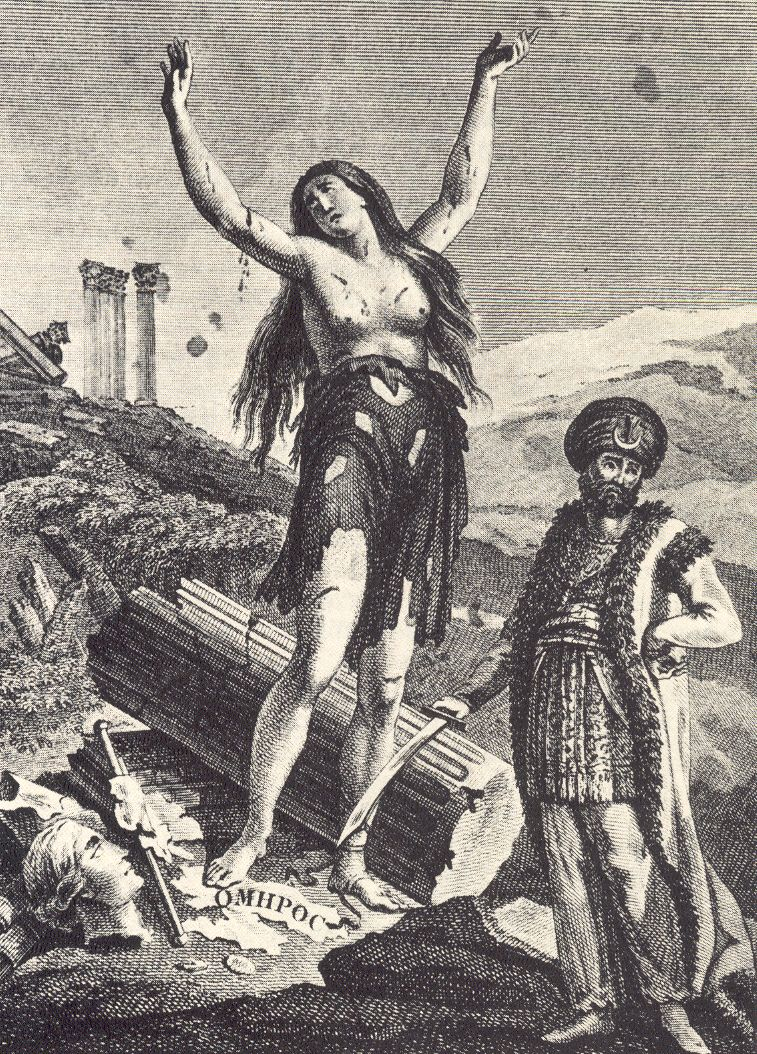
Cover from his "Salpisma Polemistirion" (1801)

Korais's most lasting contributions were literary. Those who were instrumental in publishing, and presenting his work to the public were merchants from Chios. He felt eternally grateful to these merchants, since without them, it would have been financially impossible for him to publish his works. These works included an edition of Strabo in Greek, another on Marcus Aurelius, his translation of Herodotus, the translation of the Iliad, and his main literary work, the seventeen volumes of the "Library of Greek Literature".

His political writing begins with the publication at the opening of the nineteenth century of Asma Polemistirion ("War Chant") and Salpisma Polemistirion ("Military Bugal Call"), celebrating the presence of Greek troops fighting alongside the French in Egypt. Earlier he had confronted with his Adelphiki Didaskalia the Orthodox Patriarch of Jerusalem for urging the Sultan's Christian subjects (with the religious brochure Patriki Didaskalia) to support the Ottomans in the war against the "atheistic" French. On contrary, he made a call to the Greeks to fight beside the French, "who have the military virtue of the ancient Greeks", against the Ottoman tyranny.

In 1803, Korais went on to publish his Report on the Present State of Civilization in Greece, based on a series of lectures he had given in Paris, extolling the link between the rise of a new Greek mercantile class and the advance of the Modern Greek Enlightenment. In What should we Greeks do in the Present Circumstances?, a work of 1805, he tried to win his compatriots over to Napoleon and away from the cause of their Russian co-religionists. In later years, though, his enthusiasm for the French Emperor diminished, and he ended by referring to him as the 'tyrant of tyrants.'

Away from contemporary politics, Korais did much to revive the idea of Greece with the creation of the Hellenic Library, devoted to new editions of some of the classical texts, starting with Homer in 1805. Over the following twenty years many others appeared, with lengthy prefaces by Korais entitled 'Impromptu Reflections', with his views on political, educational and linguistic matters. Although the broad mass of the Greek people was beyond his reach, he played an important part in the shaping of a new consciousness among the intelligentsia, which was to play a part in the creation of a new national movement.

With the breakout of the Greek Revolution in 1821, he was too old to join the struggle. However his house in Paris became a centre for informations, meetings among the Parisian Greeks and financial aid. He wrote also many letters advising the revolutionaries. Initially a supporter of Kapodistrias, finally he opposed his policies.

== Views on religion ==
Korais was Greek Orthodox but also a critic of many practices of the Orthodox Church. He was a fierce critic of the Ecumenical Patriarchate of Constantinople, considering it a useful tool in the hands of the Ottomans against Greek independence. Later, he was one of the supporters of the newly established, autocephalous Church of Greece.

Korais was also a critic of monasticism, the lack of education among the clergy, and practices like that of the "Holy Fire". He was a supporter of religious freedom, empiricism, rationalism and tolerance. He set himself in opposition to some metaphysical ideals of Greek custom and sought to mould Greek Orthodoxy towards a more syncretic religious vision, in order to bring it under the auspices of liberal thought and government.

== Views on the Greek language ==
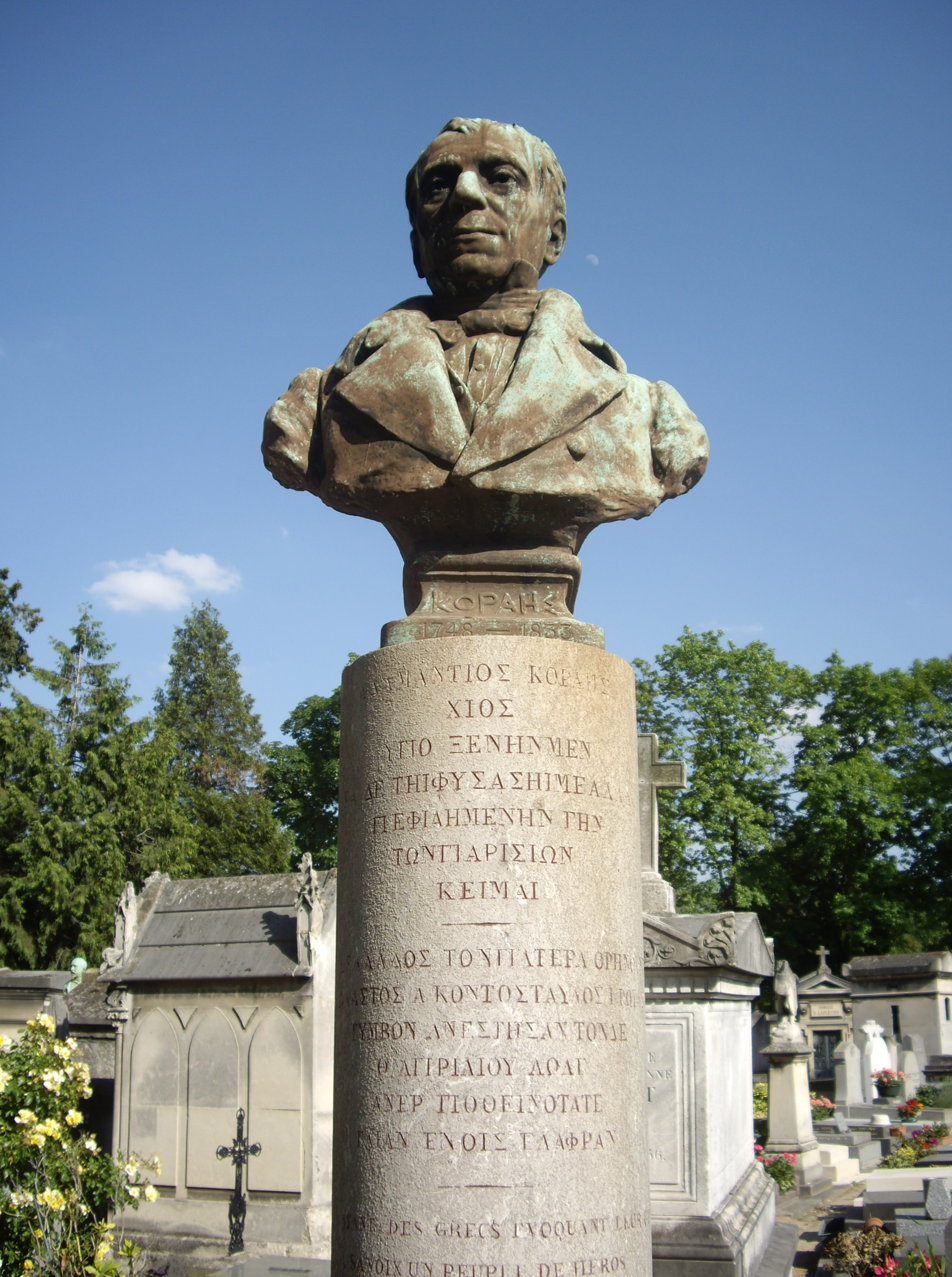
Cenotaph of Korais; Montparnasse Cemetery.

One of his most significant accomplishments was his contribution to the standardisation of the modern Greek language. During his lifetime, the Greeks were widely dispersed around the Mediterranean and throughout Europe, and the language they spoke contained many foreign elements, depending on the region and local traditions. Korais proposed a standard language purged of many such foreign elements (especially Turkish, but also Western words and phrases). Moreover, there was a variety of idioms spoken by Greeks in everyday life and no common agreement on which dialect should serve as the basis for Standard Modern Greek. Finally, people involved in the Greek language question were also divided between "archaists" and proponents of a simpler standard language.

Korais's solution was to take a middle path regarding all these issues. He cleansed his proposed standard language from elements that he considered too foreign or too vulgar. Moreover, he proposed the creation of a "katharevousa" (a "purified" version of modern Greek), based on the ecclesiastical language used by the Greek Orthodox Church, close to Koine Greek. This standard was eventually adopted by scholars and the Greek state.

== Influence on the Greek constitutional and legal system ==
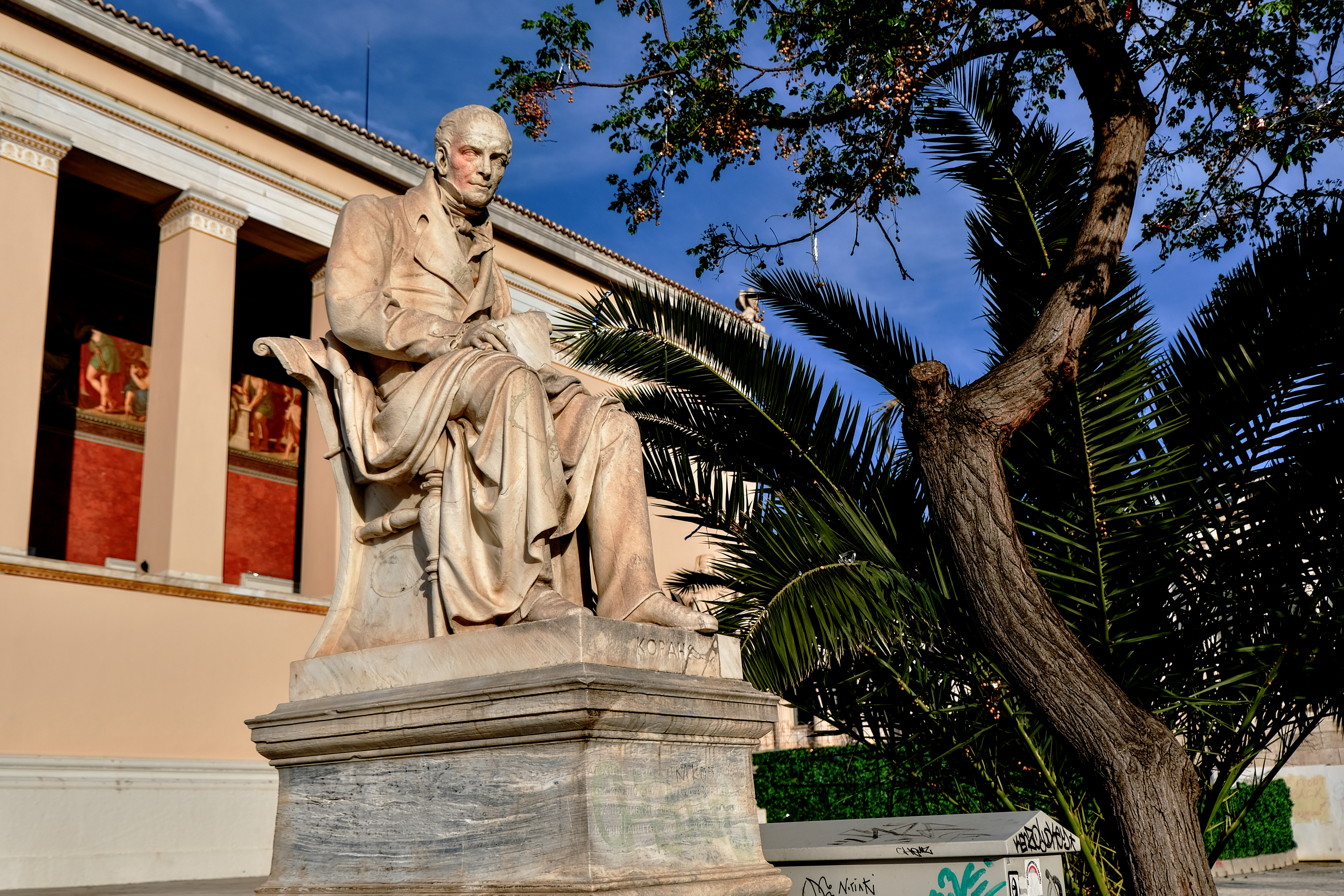
Statue of Korais in Athens (work of Ioannis Kossos).

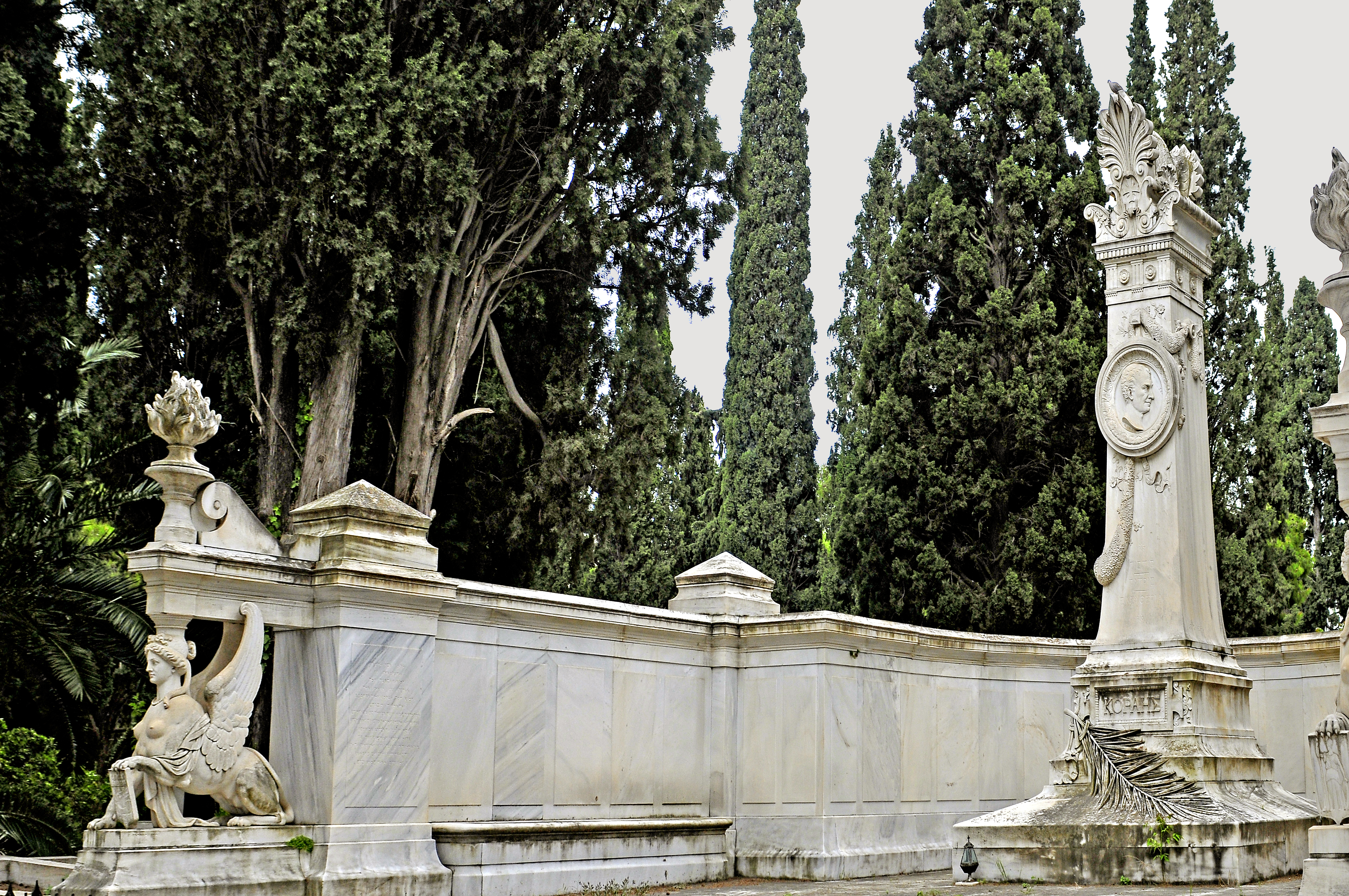
His grave at the First Cemetery of Athens

Unknown to most, Korais held passionate views on how the legal system should function in a democracy (views which of course, were greatly influenced by the French Enlightenment, closer to Montesquieu than to Rousseau) and managed to have a great, albeit indirect, impact on the Constitutions of the Greek Revolution, but also, primarily, on the Constitution or Syntagma created after the end of the Greek Revolution. This element holds significant importance if one takes into consideration the fact that these post-Revolution Constitutions still, to the present day, form the basis of the Greek Constitution and the philosophy on which the guiding principles of the Greek legal and judicial system are rooted in.

The influence Korais exercised on Greek Law was due to a personal relationship the intellectual formed with another Greek intellectual, the legal scholar of international repute N. I. Saripolos, who, after the Greek Revolution, became the founding father of Greek Law and the "author" of the Greek Constitution. Proof of this relationship and of the strong and progressive views Korais held on how the legal system of the new Greek state should be formed, is based on correspondence exchanged between the two men, during a long period of time, beginning before the Greek Revolution. These letters which manifest the influence the older intellectual (Korais) had on the then aspiring lawmaker Saripolos, are in the possession of the archives of the Greek National Library, were discovered and brought to academic light, in 1996, by a Law School student, researching a project sponsored by the Faculty of Law of the University of Athens and the National Academy for Constitutional Research and Public Law (adjacent to the University of Athens). The ensuing thesis was published.

== Legacy ==
Korais was declared Pater Patriae ("Pateras tis Patridos") by the revolutionaries at the Third National Assembly at Troezen. Korais' portrait was depicted on the reverse of the Greek ₯100 banknote of 1978–2001. Many streets all over Greece are named after him, while his archive can be found in Korais Library in Chios.

"Adamantios Korais" is also the name of the ferry connecting Alexandroupoli, Samothrace, and Lemnos. The vessel, built in 1987 in Onomichi Japan, was previously operated by Zante Ferries and is now operated by Fast Ferries.
