= Cesare Cremonini (philosopher) =

Italian academic and philosopher (1550–1631)

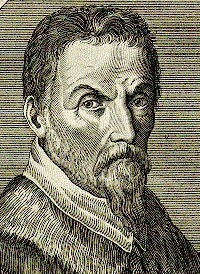
- Born: 22 December 1550; Cento, Papal States (now Province of Ferrara, Emilia-Romagna, Italy)
- Died: 19 July 1631 (aged 80); Padua, Republic of Venice (now Province of Padua, Veneto, Italy)

Philosophical work
- Era: Renaissance philosophy
- Region: Western philosophy
- School: Aristotelianism; Averroism; Scholasticism
- Main interests: Metaphysics, astronomy, medicine
- Notable ideas: Mortality of the soul, separation of reason and faith

Cesare Cremonini (Italian: [ˈtʃeːzare kremoˈniːni, ˈtʃɛː-]; 22 December 1550 – 19 July 1631), sometimes Cesare Cremonino, was an Italian academic and professor of natural philosophy. His Latinized name was Cæsar Cremoninus or Cæsar Cremonius. Considered one of the greatest philosophers in his time, patronized by Alfonso II d'Este, Duke of Ferrara, corresponding with kings and princes who had his portrait, paid twice the salary of Galileo Galilei, he is now more remembered as an infamous side actor of the Galileo affair, being one of the two scholars who refused to look through Galileo's telescope.

== Biography ==
Cesare Cremonini was born in Cento in the then Papal States. He was a professor of natural philosophy for about 60 years:

- From 1573 to 1590, at the University of Ferrara. Starting at a very young age and considered a great talent, he obtained the patronage of Alfonso II d'Este, Duke of Ferrara (to whom he would dedicate his first major book in 1596). The jealousies caused by this protection helped him to eventually accept a position outside his native province.
- From 1591 until his death, at the University of Padua in Padua, then under Republic of Venice rule (succeeding to Jacopo Zabarella), in a chair of natural philosophy and a chair of medicine.

He taught the doctrines of Aristotle, especially as interpreted by Alexander of Aphrodisias and Averroes.

He was so popular in his time that most kings and princes had his portrait and corresponded with him, sometimes consulting him about private and public affairs. At Padua, his salary was twice that of Galileo. He was especially popular among the French intellectuals who called him "le Cremonin" (the Cremonin); even a remote writer such as Jean-Louis Guez de Balzac mentioned him as "le grand Cremonin" (the great Cremonin) in his Lettres.

=== Metaphysical views ===
Following up on the controversy opened in 1516 by Pietro Pomponazzi and continued by Jacopo Zabarella (his predecessors in the chair), Cremonini too taught that reason alone cannot demonstrate the immortality of the soul – his absolute adherence to Aristotle implying that he believed in the mortality of the soul. After a paper he wrote about the Jesuits, and public statements he made in favor of laic teachers, the Jesuits in Venice accused him of materialism, then relayed their grievances to Rome. He was prosecuted in 1604 by the Inquisition for atheism and the Averroist heresy of "double truth", and ordered to refute his claims: as was his manner, Cremonini gently refused to retract himself, sheltering himself behind Aristotle's authority. Because Padua was then under tolerant Venetian rule, he was kept out of reach of a full trial.

As for the accusations, and beyond Cremonini's teachings: indeed his personal motto was "Intus ut libet, foris ut moris est" (Latin for "In private think what you wish, in public behave as is the custom"), which was taken by humanists as meaning that a scientific thinker could hold one set of opinions as a philosopher, and another set as a Christian; it was also adopted by European Libertines (brought back to France by his student and confidant Gabriel Naudé). After his death, Cremonini had his tombstone engraved with "Cæsar Cremoninus hic totus jacet" (Latin for "Here lies all of Cremonini"), implying that no soul survived.

His student Naudé (who had been his confidant for three months) qualified most of his Italian teachers as "Atheists" and especially Cremonini as a "déniaisé" ("one who has been wised up, unfoolish, devirginized", the Libertines' word for unbelievers); he added to his friends, translated, "The Cremonin, Professor of Philosophy in Padua, confessed to a few choice Friends of his that he believed neither in God, nor in Devil, nor in the immortality of the soul: yet he was careful that his manservant was a good Catholic, for fear he said, should he believe in nothing, that he may one morning cut my throat in my bed". Later, Pierre Bayle pointed out that Cremonini did not believe in the immortality of the soul (in the "Crémonin" article of his Historical and Critical Dictionary). Gottfried Leibniz, in his 1710 Theodicy, dealing with the Averroists, who "declared that man's soul is, according to philosophy, mortal, while they protested their acquiescence in Christian theology, which declares the soul's immortality", says "that very sect of the Averroists survived as a school. It is thought that Caesar Cremoninus, a philosopher famous in his time, was one of its mainstays". Pierre Larousse, in his opinionated Grand dictionnaire universel du XIXe siècle, stated Cremonini was not a Christian.

=== Cremonini and Galileo ===
At Padua Cremonini was both a rival and a friend of his colleague Galileo. When Galileo announced that he had discovered mountains on the Moon in 1610, he offered Cremonini the chance to observe the evidence through a telescope. Cremonini refused even to look through the telescope and insisted that Aristotle had definitely proved the Moon could only be a perfect sphere. When Galileo decided to move to Tuscany that year, Cremonini warned him that it would bring him under the Inquisition's jurisdiction. Indeed, the next year the Inquisition reviewed Cremonini's case for evidence against Galileo. Years later, in his book Dialogue Concerning the Two Chief World Systems, Galileo would include the character Simplicio - the name was not casually chosen - a dogmatic Aristotelian philosopher who was partly based on Cremonini.

=== Death and legacy ===
When Cremonini died in 1631 during the Paduan outbreak of the Italian Plague of 1629-1631, more than 400 students were working with him. His previous students included, alphabetically:

- Theophilos Corydalleus, graduated 1613, a Greek philosopher, had some influence in the Greek-speaking world during the 17th and 18th centuries, founded Corydalism
- William Harvey, graduated 1602, an English doctor who was the first to correctly describe the circulation of the blood
- Joachim Jung, graduated 1619, a German mathematician and naturalist popularized by John Ray
- Ioannis Kottounios, an eminent Greek scholar and his successor to the chair of philosophy at Padua
- Justus Lipsius, a philosopher of the Spanish Netherlands
- Gabriel Naudé, in 1625–27, a French scholar and Cardinal Mazarin's librarian
- Guy Patin, a French doctor, headmaster of the School of Medicine in Paris
- Antonio Rocco, an Italian philosophy teacher and libertine writer
- Corfitz Ulfeldt, in 1628–29, a famous Danish statesman and traitor
- Flemming Ulfeldt, also in 1628–29, a Danish statesman and military leader, younger brother of Corfitz

He was buried in the Benedictine monastery of St. Justina of Padua (to which he also willed his possessions). His name has been given to several streets ("via Cesare Cremonini" in Cento, "via Cesare Cremonino" in Padua) and an institute ("Istituto Magistrale Cesare Cremonini" in Cento).

== Bibliography ==
=== Concise bibliography ===
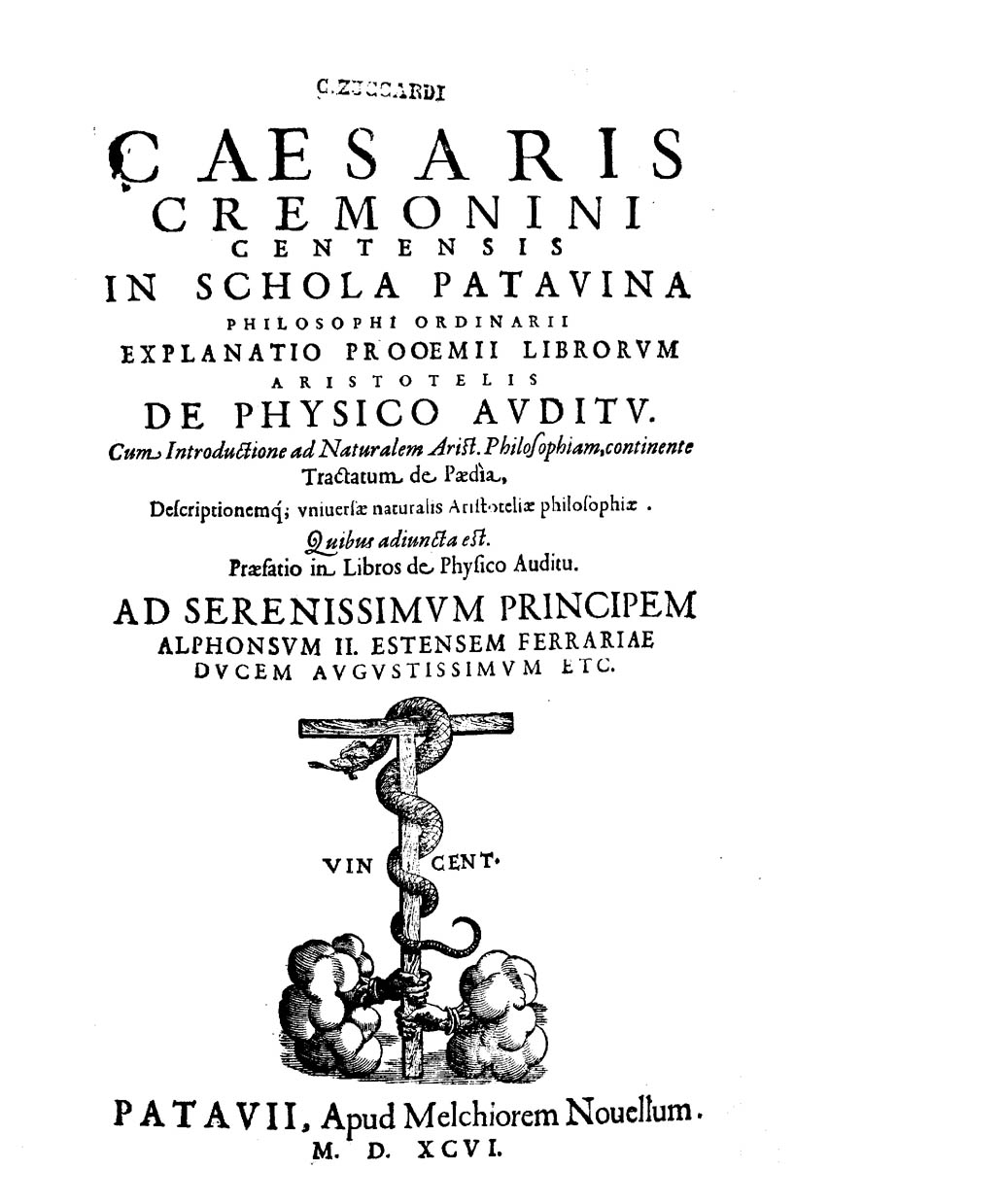
Explanatio prooemii librorum Aristotelis De physico auditu, 1596

Below are his main books (many of them including separate treatises), listing only their most usual abridged titles:

- 1596: Explanatio proœmii librorum Aristotelis De physico auditu
- 1605: De formis elementorum
- 1611: De Anima (student transcript of a Cremonini lecture)
- 1613: Disputatio de cœlo
- 1616: De quinta cœli substantia (second series of De cœlo)
- 1626: De calido innato (reprinted in 1634)
- 1627: De origine et principatu membrorum
- 163?: De semine (printed or reprinted in 1634)
  --- Posthumous:
- 1634: De calido innato et semine (expanding 1626 with 163?)
- 1644: De sensibus et facultate appetitiva
- 1663: Dialectica

(Not included are poems and other personal texts.)

=== Extended bibliography ===
Below are his main books (with usual short titles, original full titles, and indication of some variants or misspellings commonly found in literature). As was the practice of the time, many of them are made of opuscules, separate treatises grouped in a single binding. (Please note that Latin title spelling can vary depending on their grammatical position in a sentence, such as a "tractatus" becoming a "tractatum" in the accusative case when inside a longer title.)

- 1596: Explanatio proœmii librorum Aristotelis De physico auditu [1+20+22+43+1 folios] (Explanatio proœmii librorum Aristotelis De physico auditu cum introductione ad naturalem Aristotelis philosophiam, continente tractatum de pædia, descriptionemque universæ naturalis Aristoteliæ philosophiæ, quibus adjuncta est præfatio in libros De physico auditu. Ad serenissimum principem Alphonsum II Estensem Ferrariæ ducem augustissimum) also ("Explanatio proœmii librorum Aristotelis De physico auditu, et in eosdem Præfatio, una cum Tractatu de Pædia, seu, Introductione ad philosophiam naturalem Aristotelis.") (ed. Melchiorre Novello as "Melchiorem Novellum") – Padua: Novellum
  - "Tractatus de pædia" alias "De pædia Aristotelis" or sometimes "De pœdia Aristotelis" (also as "Descriptio universæ naturalis Aristoteliæ philosophiæ", or erroneously "Diatyposis universæ naturalis aristotelicæ philosophiæ")
  - "Introductio ad naturalem Aristotelis philosophiam" (sometimes "Introductio ad naturalem Aristotelis philosophiam")
  - "Explanatio proœmii librorum Aristotelis De physico auditu" (sometimes "Explanatio proœmii librorum De physico auditu")
- 1605: De formis elementorum (Disputatio De formis quatuor corporum simplicium quæ vocantur elementa) – Venice
- 1611: De Anima (De Anima lectiones 31, opiniones antiquorum de anima lect. 17) – student transcript of a Cremonini lecture
- 1613: Disputatio de cœlo (Disputatio de cœlo : in tres partes divisa, de natura cœli, de motu cœli, de motoribus cœli abstractis. Adjecta est Apologia dictorum Aristotelis, de via lactea, et de facie in orbe lunæ) – Venice: Thomam Balionum
  - "De cœlo"
    - "De natura cœli"
    - "De motu cœli"
    - "De motoribus cœli abstractis"
  - "De via lactea"
  - "De facie in orbe lunæ"
- 1616: De quinta cœli substantia (Apologia dictorum Aristotelis, de quinta cœli substantia adversus Xenarcum, Joannem Grammaticum, et alios) – Venice: Meiettum (second series of De cœlo)
- 1626: De calido innato (Apologia dictorum Aristotelis De calido innato adversus Galenum) – Venice: Deuchiniana (reprinted in 1634)
- 1627: De origine et principatu membrorum (Apologia dictorum Aristotelis De origine et Principatu membrorum adversus Galenum) – Venice: Hieronymum Piutum
  - "De origine"
  - "De principatu membrorum"
- 163?: De semine (Expositio in digressionem Averrhois de semine contra Galenum pro Aristotele) – (printed or reprinted in 1634)
  --- Posthumous:
- 1634: De calido innato et semine (Tractatus de calido innato, et semine, pro Aristotele adversus Galenum) – Leiden: Elzevir (Lugduni-Batavorum) (expanding 1626 with 163?)
  - "De calido innato"
  - "De semine" (Apologia dictorum Aristotelis De Semine)
- 1644: De sensibus et facultate appetitiva (Tractatus tres : primus est de sensibus externis, secundus de sensibus internis, tertius de facultate appetitiva. Opuscula haec revidit Troylus Lancetta auctoris discipulus, et adnotatiotes confecit in margine) also (Tractatus III : de sensibus externis, de sensibus internis, de facultate appetitiva) (ed. Troilo Lancetta, as "Troilus Lancetta" or "Troilo de Lancettis"), Venice: Guerilios
  - "De sensibus externis"
  - "De sensibus internis"
  - "De facultate appetitiva"
- 1663: Dialectica (Dialectica, Logica sive dialectica) (ed. Troilo Lancetta, as "Troilus Lancetta" or "Troilo de Lancettis") (sometimes "Dialecticum opus posthumum") – Venice: Guerilios

(Poems and other personal texts not included here.)

== Sources ==
Dictionaries and encyclopedias

- Pierre Bayle: "Crémonin, César". In: Dictionnaire historique et critique, vol. 5, 1820, pp. 320–323
- John Gorton: A General Biographical Dictionary, London: Henry G. Bohn, 1828, new edition 1851, page 146, article "Cremonini, Cæsar" online
- Adolphe Franck: Dictionnaire des sciences philosophiques, volume 1, Paris: Hachette, 1844, pp. 598–599, article "Crémonini, César" (in French) online
- Ferdinand Hoefer : Nouvelle biographie générale, volume XII, Paris: Firmin-Didot, 1855, second edition 1857, pp. 416–419, article "Cremonini, César" (in French) online
- Pierre Larousse: Grand dictionnaire universel du XIXe siècle, volume 5, Paris: 1869, page 489, article "Crémonini, César" (in French) online (PDF or TIFF plugin required)
- Marie-Nicolas Bouillet, Alexis Chassang (ed.): Dictionnaire universel d'histoire et de géographie, 26th edition, Paris: Hachette, 1878, page 474, article "Cremonini, César" (in French) online (PDF or TIFF plugin required)
- Werner Ziegenfuss: Philosophen-lexikon: Handwörterbuch der Philosophie nach Personen, Walter de Gruyter, 1950, ISBN 3-11-002896-4, page 208, article "Cremoninus, Caesar (Cesare Cremonini)"
- Various: Encyclopædia Universalis, CD-ROM edition: 1996, article "Cremonini, C." (in French)
- Herbert Jaumann: Handbuch Gelehrtenkultur der Frühen Neuzeit, Walter de Gruyter, 2004, ISBN 3-11-016069-2, page 203, article "Cremonini, Cesare"
- Filosofico.net: Indice alfabetico dei filosofi, article "Cesare Cremonino" (in Italian) online : picture and profile
- Philosophy Institute at the University of Düsseldorf: Philosophengalerie, article "Caesar Cremoninus (Cesare Cremonini)" (in German) online : another picture, bibliography, literature

Philosophy

- Léopold Mabilleau: Étude historique sur la philosophie de la Renaissance en Italie, Paris: Hachette, 1881
- J.-Roger Charbonnel: La pensée italienne au XVIe siècle et le courant libertin, Paris: Champion, 1919
- David Wootton: "Unbelief in Early Modern Europe", History Workshop Journal, No. 20, 1985, pages 83–101 : Averroes, Pomponazzi, Cremonini

Cremonini and Galileo

- Evan R. Soulé, Jr.: "The Energy Machine of Joseph Newman", Discover Magazine, May 1987, online version : telescope incident account
- Thomas Lessl: "The Galileo Legend", New Oxford Review, June 2000, pp. 27–33, online at CatholicEducation.org : telescope incident note
- Paul Newall: "The Galileo Affair", 2005, online at Galilean-Library.org : telescope incident note (with typo "Cremoni")
- W.R. Laird: "Venetischer Aristotelismus im Ende der aristotelischen Welt: Aspekte der Welt und des Denkens des Cesare Cremonini (1550–1631)(Review)" in Renaissance Quarterly, 1999, online excerpt at Amazon.com or excerpt at FindArticles.com
- Stephen Mason: "Galileo's Scientific Discoveries, Cosmological Confrontations, and the Aftermath", in History of Science, volume 40, December 2002, pp. 382–383 (article pp. 6–7), PDF version online : salary, advices to Galileo
- Galileo Galilei, Andrea Frova, Mariapiera Marenzana: Thus Spoke Galileo, Oxford University Press, 2006 (translated from a 1998 book), ISBN 0-19-856625-5, page 9 : Inquisition
