= Ioannina =

Capital and largest city of Epirus, Greece

Ioannina Ιωάννινα
- Municipality
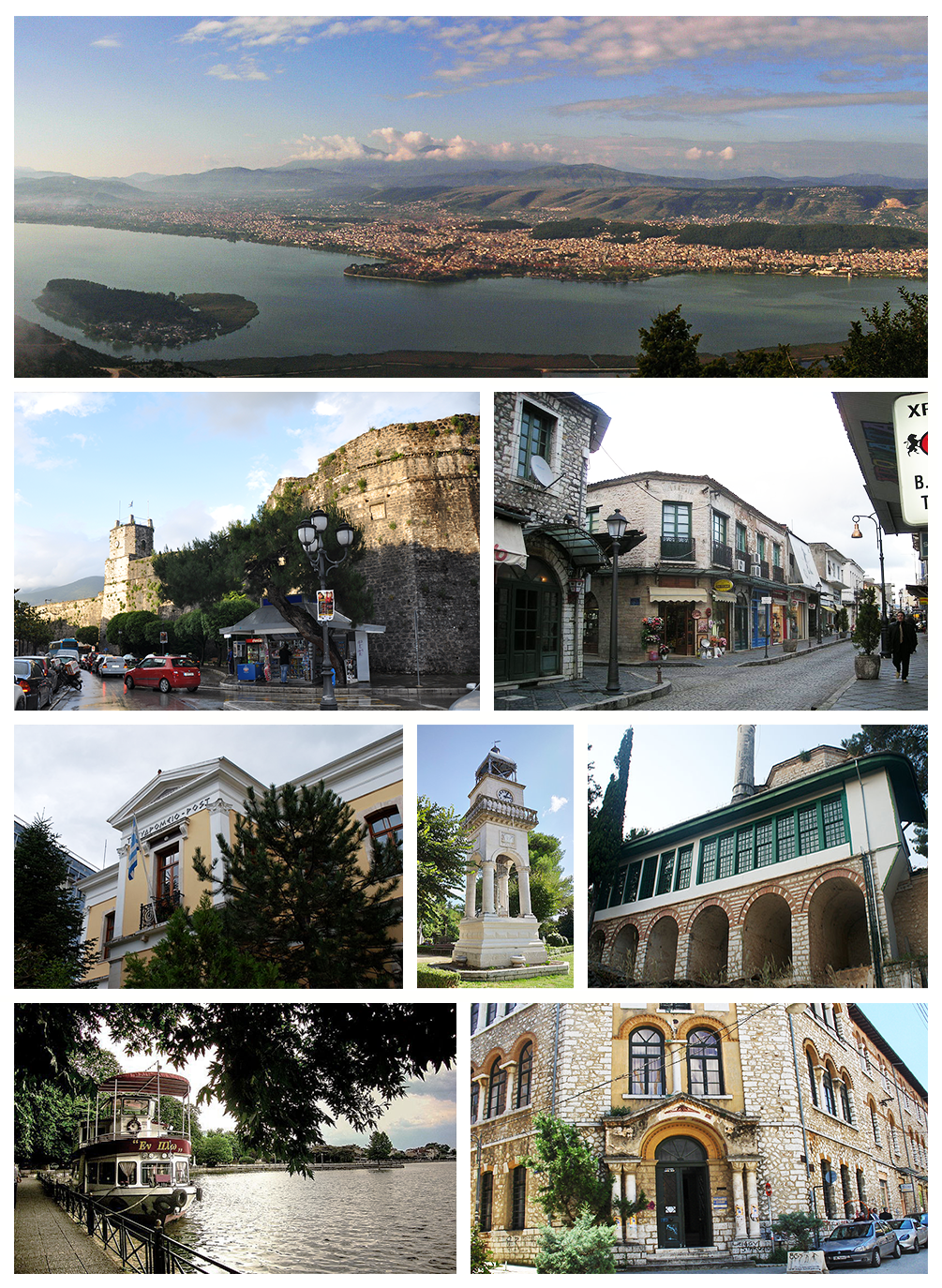
- Clockwise from top: Panoramic view of Lake Pamvotis and the city of Ioannina from Mitsikeli, Old Town, Municipal Clock Tower of Ioannina, Municipal Ethnographic Museum of Ioannina, Kaplaneios School, Ferry to the Island, Post Office, and the Castle of Ioannina.

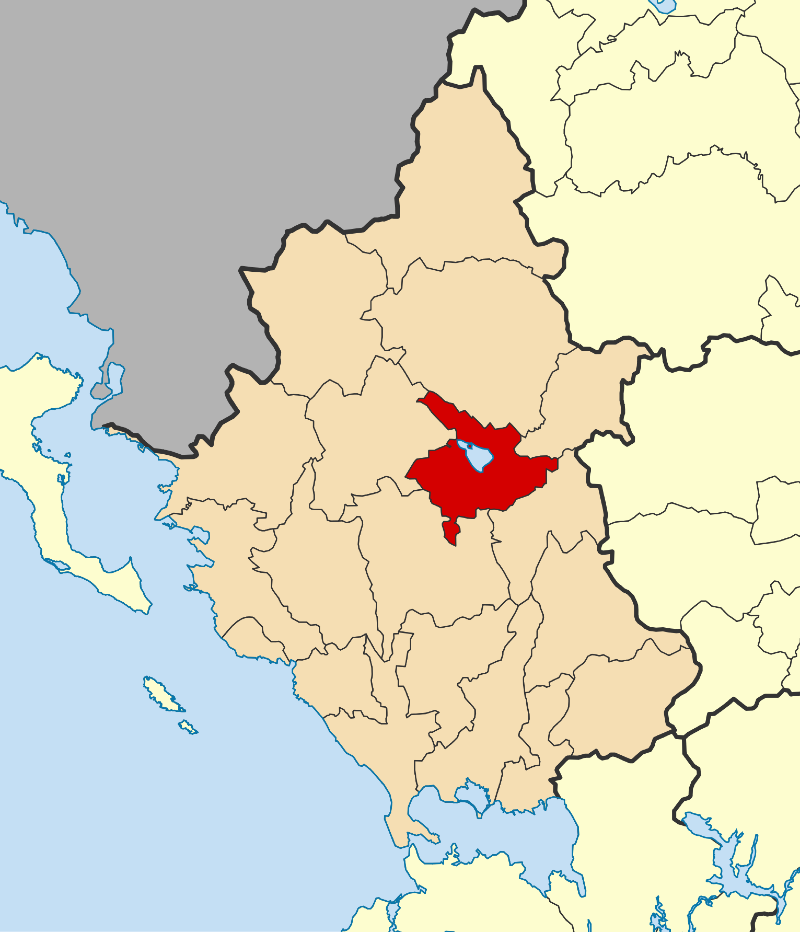

- Location within Greece
- Coordinates: 39°39′49″N 20°51′08″E
- Country: Greece
- Administrative region: Epirus
- Regional unit: Ioannina

Government
  - Mayor: Thomas Begkas (since 2023)

Area
  - Municipality: 403.32 km^{2} (155.72 sq mi)
  - Municipal unit: 47.44 km^{2} (18.32 sq mi)
  - Community: 17.355 km^{2} (6.701 sq mi)
- Elevation: 480 m (1,570 ft)

Population (2021)
  - Municipality: 113,978
  - Density: 282.60/km^{2} (731.93/sq mi)
  - Municipal unit: 81,627
  - Municipal unit density: 1,721/km^{2} (4,456/sq mi)
  - Community: 64,896
  - Community density: 3,739.3/km^{2} (9,684.8/sq mi)
- Demonym(s): Yanniote (Gianniote)/ Ioannite (formal)
- Time zone: UTC+2 (EET)
  - Summer (DST): UTC+3 (EEST)
- Postal code: 45x xx
- Area code: 26510
- Vehicle registration: ΙΝ, II
- Website: ioannina.gr

Ioannina (Greek: Ιωάννινα, romanized: Ioánnina, pronounced [i.oˈanina]), often called Yanina (Greek: Γιάννινα or Γιάννενα), is the capital and largest city of the Ioannina regional unit and of Epirus, an administrative region in northwestern Greece.

According to the 2021 census, the city population was 64,896 while the municipality had 113,978 inhabitants. It lies at an elevation of approximately 500 metres (1,640 feet) above sea level, on the western shore of Lake Pamvotis (Παμβώτις). Ioannina is located 410 km (255 mi) northwest of Athens, 260 kilometres (162 miles) southwest of Thessaloniki and 80 km (50 miles) east of the port of Igoumenitsa on the Ionian Sea.

The city's foundation has traditionally been ascribed to the Byzantine Emperor Justinian in the 6th century AD, but modern archaeological research has uncovered evidence of Hellenistic settlements. Ioannina flourished in the late Byzantine period (13th–15th centuries). It became part of the Despotate of Epirus following the Fourth Crusade and many wealthy Byzantine families fled there following the 1204 sack of Constantinople, with the city experiencing great prosperity and considerable autonomy, despite the political turmoil. Ioannina surrendered to the Ottomans in 1430, and until 1867 it was the administrative center of the Ioannina Eyalet, serving as a power base for Ali Pasha. In the period between the 18th and 19th centuries, the city was a major center of the modern Greek Enlightenment. Ioannina was ceded to Greece in 1913 following the Balkan Wars.

The city is also characterized by various green areas and parks, including Molos (Lake Front), Litharitsia Park, Pirsinella Park (Giannotiko Saloni), Suburban Forest. There are two hospitals, the General Hospital of Ioannina "G. Hatzikosta", and the University Hospital of Ioannina. It is also the seat of the University of Ioannina. The city's emblem consists of the portrait of the Byzantine Emperor Justinian crowned by a stylized depiction of the nearby ancient theater of Dodona.

== Name ==
The city's formal name, Ioannina, is probably a corruption of Agioannina or Agioanneia, 'place of St. John', and is said to be linked to the establishment of a monastery dedicated to Saint John the Baptist, around which the later settlement (in the area of the current Ioannina Castle) grew.

According to another theory, the city was named after Ioannina, the daughter of Belisarius, general of the emperor Justinian.

William Martin Leake wrote in Travels in Northern Greece (published in 1835), in a passage dated July 1809, that in Byzantine sources and in ecclesiastical usage, the city's name appears as Τὰ Ἰωάννινα. In the spoken language, however, this form became corrupted into popular variants such as Ίάννινα, Ίάνενα, Γιανένα, and, most commonly, Γιάννινα, from which the Italian form Giannina is derived. The ordinary pronunciation follows this vulgar spelling and may be approximately rendered in English as Yannina; but the more educated people not only adhere to the orthography derived from the name Ιωάννης, but also preserve the sound of the omega in pronunciation.

There are two forms of the name in Greek, Ioannina being the formal and historical name, while the colloquial and much more commonly used Υannena or Υannina (Greek: Γιάννενα, Γιάννινα) represents the vernacular tradition of Demotic Greek. The demotic form also corresponds to those in the neighboring languages (e.g., Bulgarian: Янина, Albanian: Janina or Janinë, Aromanian: Ianina, Enina or Enãna, Macedonian: Јанина, Turkish: Yanya).

== History ==
=== Antiquity and early Middle Ages ===
The first indications of human presence in Ioannina basin are dated back to the Paleolithic period (24,000 years ago) as testified by findings in the cavern of Kastritsa. During classical antiquity the basin was inhabited by the Molossians and four of their settlements have been identified there. Despite the extensive destruction suffered in Molossia during the Roman conquest of 167 BC, settlement continued in the basin albeit no longer in an urban pattern.

The exact time of Ioannina's foundation is unknown, but it is commonly identified with an unnamed new, "well-fortified" city, recorded by the historian Procopius as having been built by the Byzantine emperor Justinian I for the inhabitants of ancient Euroia. This view is not supported, however, by any concrete archaeological evidence. Early 21st-century excavations have brought to light fortifications dating to the Hellenistic period, the course of which was largely followed by later reconstruction of the fortress in the Byzantine and Ottoman periods. The identification of the site with one of the ancient cities of Epirus has not yet been possible.

It is not until 879 that the name Ioannina appears for the first time, in the acts of the Fourth Council of Constantinople, which refer to one Zacharias, Bishop of Ioannine, a suffragan of Naupaktos. After the Byzantine conquest of Bulgaria, in 1020 Emperor Basil II subordinated the local bishopric to the Archbishopric of Ohrid. The Greek archaeologist K. Tsoures dated the Byzantine city walls and the northeastern citadel of the Ioannina Castle to the 10th century, with additions in the late 11th century, including the south-eastern citadel, traditionally ascribed to the short-lived occupation of the city by the Normans under the leadership of Bohemond of Taranto in 1082. In a chrysobull to the Venetians in 1198, the city is listed as part of its own province (provincia Joanninorum or Joaninon). In the treaty of partition of the Byzantine lands after the Fourth Crusade, Ioannina was promised to the Venetians, but in the event, it became part of the new state of Epirus, founded by Michael I Komnenos Doukas.

=== Late Middle Ages (1204–1430) ===
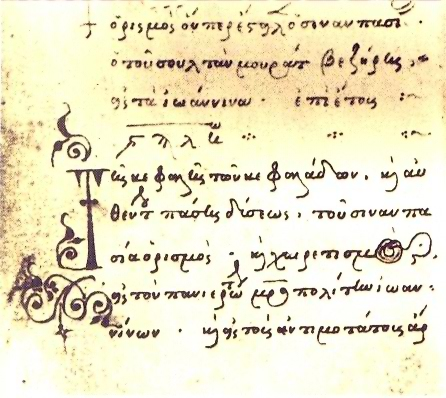
The "Rule of Sinan Pasha" (9 October 1430), written in Greek, granted to the citizens a series of privileges under Ottoman control

Under Michael I, the city was enlarged and fortified anew. The Metropolitan of Naupaktos, John Apokaukos, reports how the city was but a "small town", until Michael gathered refugees who had fled Constantinople and other parts of the Empire that fell to the crusaders of the Fourth Crusade (1202–1204), and settled them there, transforming the city into a fortress and "ark of salvation". Despite frictions with local inhabitants who tried in 1232 to expel the refugees, the latter were eventually successfully settled and Ioannina gained in both population and economic and political importance. In the aftermath of the Battle of Pelagonia in 1259, much of Epirus was occupied by the Empire of Nicaea, and Ioannina was placed under siege. Soon, however, the Epirote ruler Michael II Komnenos Doukas, aided by his younger son John I Doukas, managed to recover their capital of Arta and relieve Ioannina, evicting the Nicaeans from Epirus.

In c. 1275 or c. 1285, John I Doukas, now ruler of Thessaly, launched a raid against the city and its environs, and a few years later an army from the restored Byzantine Empire unsuccessfully laid siege to the city. Following the assassination in 1318 of the last native ruler, Thomas I Komnenos Doukas, by his nephew Nicholas Orsini, the city refused to accept the latter and turned to the Byzantines for assistance. On this occasion, Emperor Andronikos II Palaiologos elevated the city to a metropolitan bishopric, and in 1319 issued a chrysobull conceding wide-ranging autonomy and various privileges and exemptions on its inhabitants. A Jewish community is also attested in the city in 1319. In the Epirote revolt of 1337–1338 against Byzantine rule, the city remained loyal to Emperor Andronikos III Palaiologos. Soon afterwards Ioannina fell to the Serb ruler Stephen Dushan and remained part of the Serbian Empire until 1356, when Dushan's half-brother Simeon Uroš was evicted by Nikephoros II Orsini.

The attempt of Nikephoros to restore the Epirote state was short-lived as he was killed in the Battle of Achelous against Albanian tribes, but Ioannina was not captured. It thus served as a place of refuge for many Greeks of the region of Vagenetia. In 1366–67 Simeon Uroš, having recovered Epirus and Thessaly, appointed his son-in-law Thomas II Preljubović as the new overlord of Ioannina. Thomas proved a deeply unpopular ruler, but he nonetheless repelled successive attempts by Albanian chieftains including a surprise attack in 1379, whose failure the Ioannites attributed to intervention by their patron saint, Michael.

After Thomas' murder in 1384, the citizens of Ioannina offered their city to Esau de' Buondelmonti, who married Thomas' widow, Maria. Esau recalled those exiled under Thomas and restored the properties confiscated by him. In 1389, Ioannina was besieged by Gjin Bua Shpata, and only with the aid of an Ottoman army was Esau able to repel the Albanians. Despite the ongoing Ottoman expansion and the conflicts between Turks and Albanians in the vicinity of Ioannina, Esau managed to secure a period of peace for the city, especially following his second marriage to Shpata's daughter Irene in c. 1396. Following Esau's death in 1411, the Ioannites invited the Count palatine of Cephalonia and Zakynthos, Carlo I Tocco, who had already been expanding his domains into Epirus for the last decade, as their new ruler. By 1416 Carlo I Tocco had managed to capture Arta as well, thereby reuniting the core of the old Epirote realm, and received recognition from both the Ottomans and the Byzantine emperor. Ioannina became the summer capital of the Tocco domains, and Carlo I died there in July 1429. Carlo I's army, as well as the army of the city of Ioannina itself both before and during Carlo I's rule, was composed primarily of Albanians. His oldest bastard son, Ercole, called on the Ottomans for aid against the legitimate heir, Carlo II Tocco. In 1430 an Ottoman army, fresh from the capture of Thessalonica, appeared before Ioannina. The city surrendered after the Ottoman commander, Sinan Pasha, promised to spare the city and respect its autonomy.

=== Ottoman period (1430–1913) ===
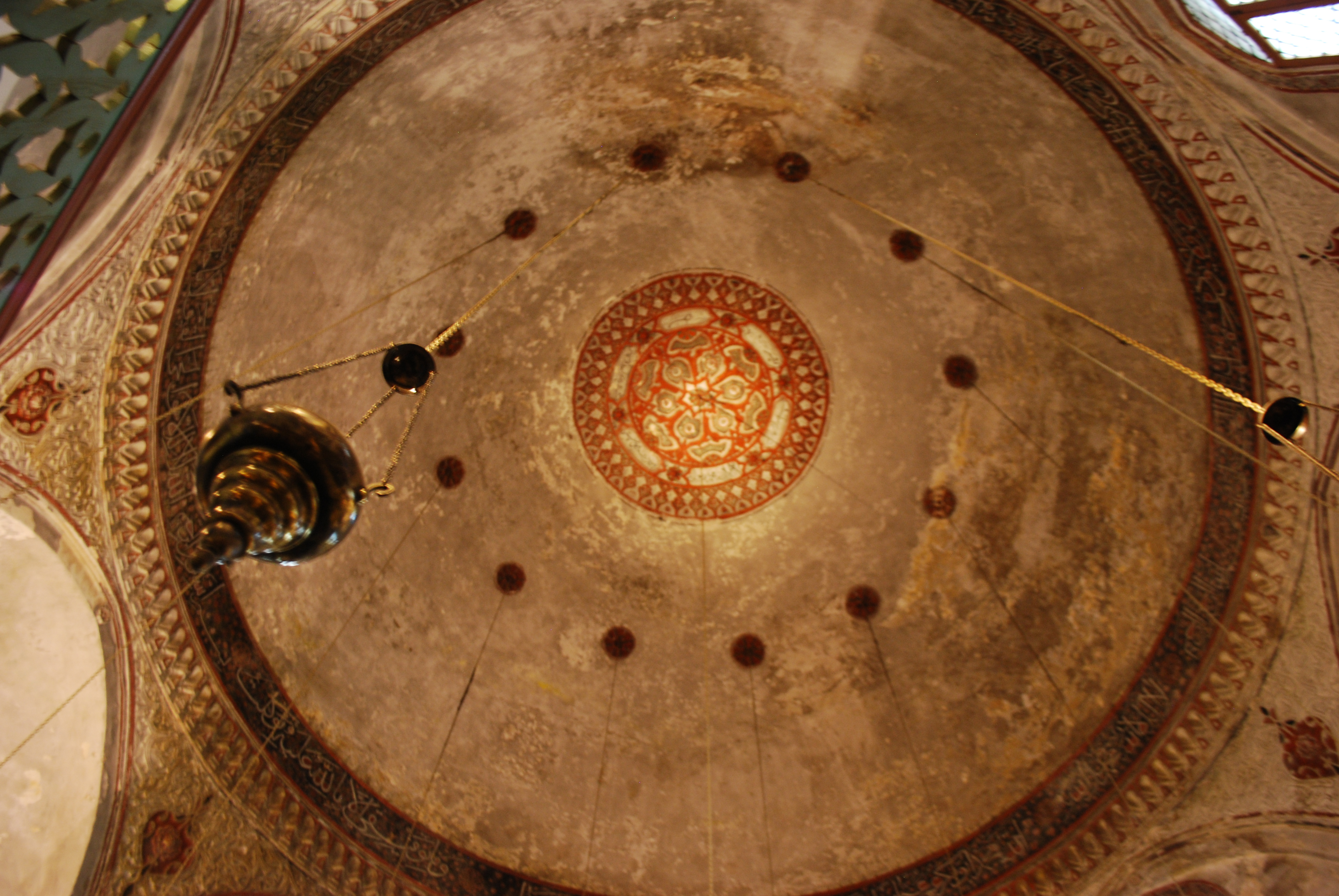
Interior view of the dome of the Aslan Pasha Mosque built on the site of the Church of Saint John, which was torn down after the failed anti-Ottoman revolt of 1611

Under Ottoman rule, Ioannina remained an administrative centre, as the seat of the Sanjak of Ioannina, and experienced a period of relative stability and prosperity. The first Ottoman tax registers for the city dates to 1564, and records 50 Muslim households and 1,250 Christian ones; another register from 15 years later mentions Jews as well.

In 1611 the city suffered a serious setback as a result of a peasant revolt led by Dionysius the Philosopher, the Metropolitan of Larissa. The Greek inhabitants of the city were unaware of the intent of the fighting as previous successes of Dionysius had depended on the element of surprise. Much confusion ensued as Turks and Christians ended up indiscriminately fighting friend and foe alike. The revolt ended in the abolition of all privileges granted to the Christian inhabitants, who were driven away from the castle area and had to settle around it. From then onwards, Turks and Jews were to be established in the castle area. The School of the Despots at the Church of the Taxiarchs, that had been operating since 1204, was closed.

Aslan Pasha also destroyed the monastery of St John the Baptist within the city walls in 1618 erected in its place the Aslan Pasha Mosque, today housing the Municipal Ethnographic Museum of Ioannina. The Ottoman reprisals in the wake of the revolt included the confiscation of many timars previously granted to Christian sipahis; this began a wave of conversions to Islam by the local gentry, who became the so-called Tourkoyanniotes (Τoυρκογιαννιώτες). The Ottoman traveller Evliya Çelebi, who visited the city in c. 1670, counted 37 quarters, of which 18 Muslim, 14 Christian, four Jewish and one Gypsy. He estimated the population at 4,000 hearths.

==== Center of Greek Enlightenment (17th–18th centuries) ====
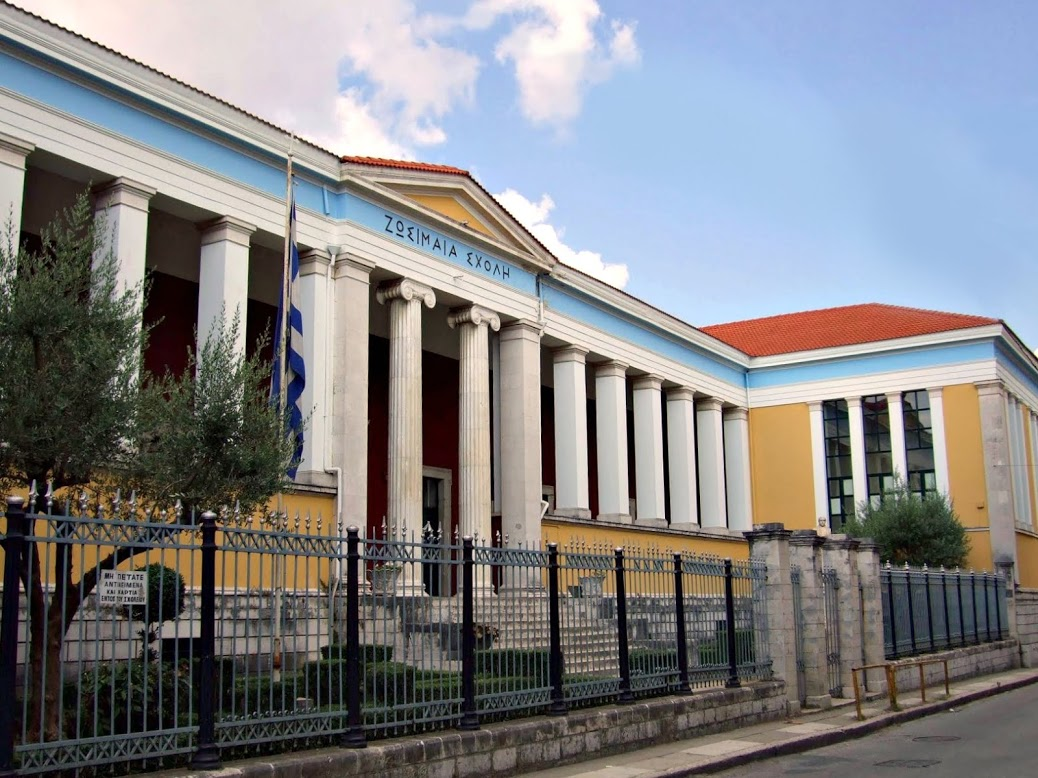
The old Zosimaia School, now municipal school

Despite the repression and conversions in the 17th century, and the prominence of the Muslim population in the city's affairs, Ioannina retained its Christian majority throughout Ottoman rule, and the Greek language retained a dominant position; Turkish was spoken by the Ottoman officials and the garrison, and the Albanian inhabitants used Albanian, but the lingua franca and native language of most inhabitants was Greek, including among the Tourkoyanniotes, and was sometimes used by the Ottoman authorities themselves.

The city also soon recovered from the financial effects of the revolt. In the late 17th century Ioannina was a thriving city with respect to population and commercial activity. Evliya Çelebi mentions the presence of 1,900 shops and workshops. The great economic prosperity of the city was followed by remarkable cultural activity. During the 17th and 18th centuries, many important schools were established. Its inhabitants continued their commercial and handicraft activities which allowed them to trade with important European commercial centers, such as Venice and Livorno, where merchants from Ioannina established commercial and banking houses. The Ioannite diaspora was also culturally active: Nikolaos Glykys (in 1670), Nikolaos Sarros (in 1687) and Dimitrios Theodosiou (in 1755) established private printing presses in Venice, responsible for over 1,600 editions of books for circulation in the Ottoman-ruled Greek lands, and Ioannina was the centre through which these books were channeled into Greece. These were significant historical, theological as well as scientific works, including an algebra book funded by the Zosimades brothers, books for use in the schools of Ioannina such as the Arithmetica of Balanos Vasilopoulos, as well as medical books. At the same time these merchants and entrepreneurs maintained close economic and intellectual relations with their birthplace and founded charity and education establishments. These merchants were to be major national benefactors.

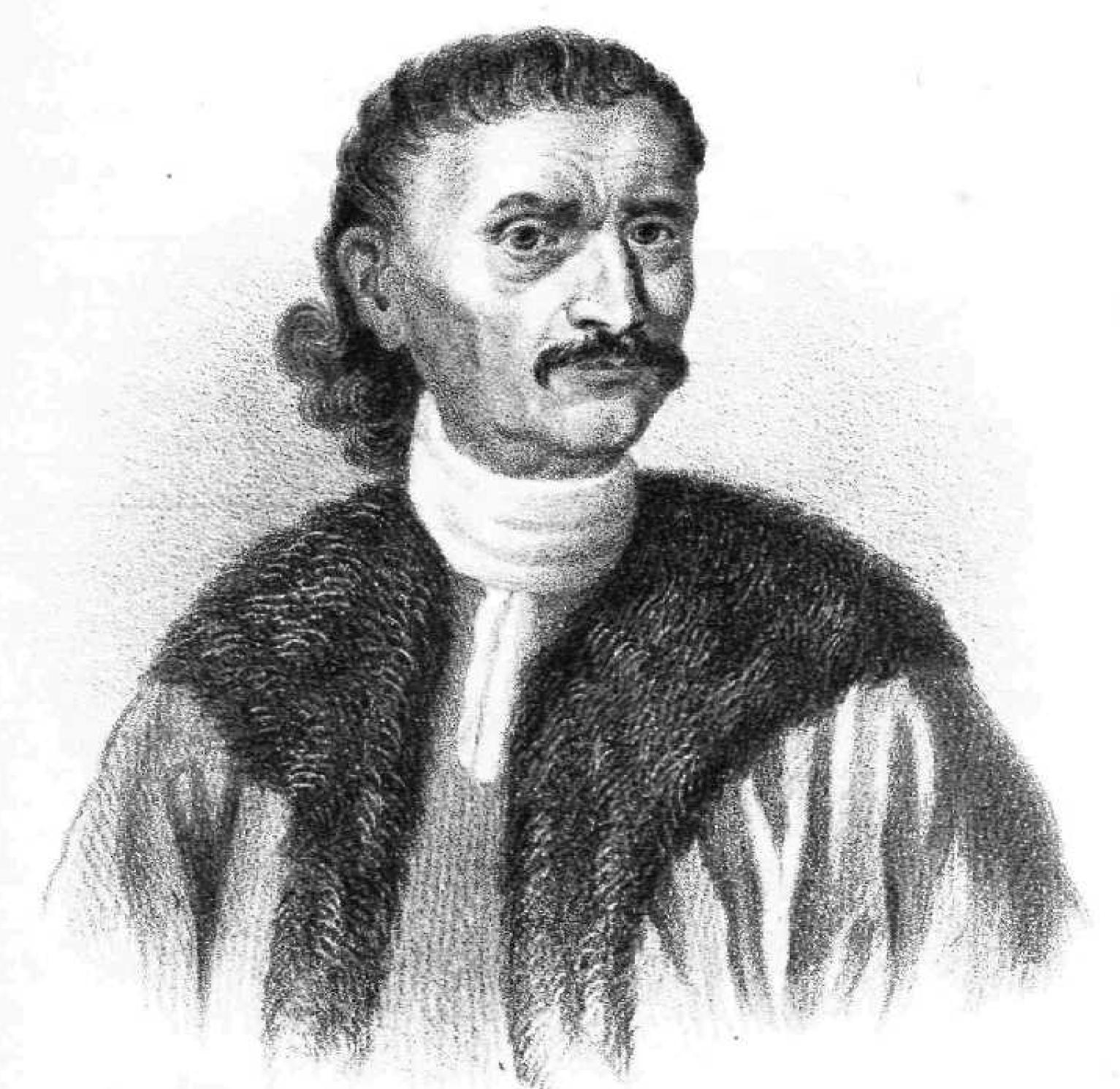
Zois Kaplanis, Greek philanthropist from Ioannina, founder of the Kaplaneios School

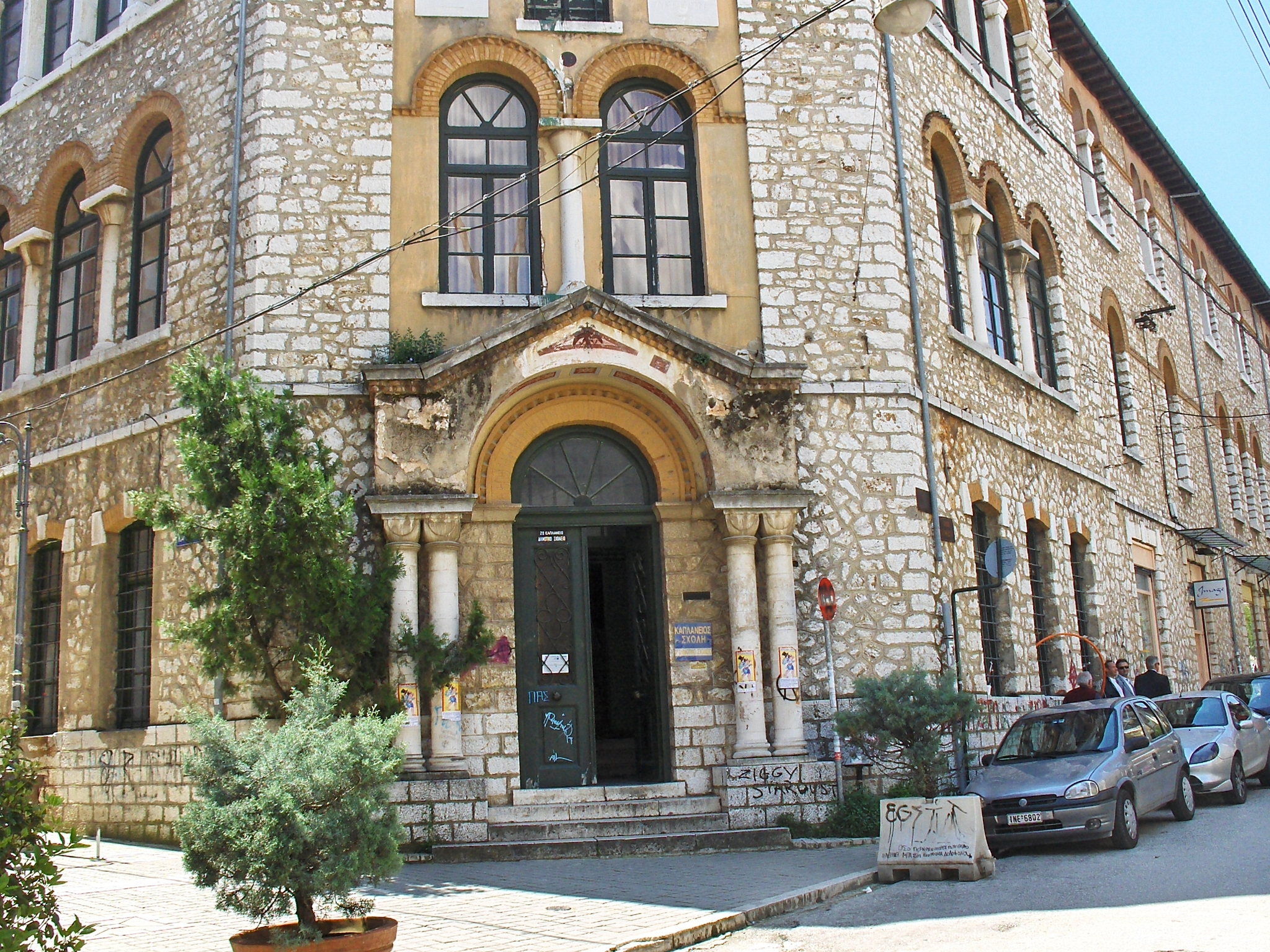
Kaplaneios School

Thus the Epiphaniou School was founded in 1647 by a Greek merchant of Ioannite origin resident in Venice, Epiphaneios Igoumenos. The Gioumeios School was founded in 1676 by a benefaction from another wealthy Ioannite Greek from Venice, Emmanuel Goumas. It was renamed Balaneios by its rector, Balanos Vasilopoulos, in 1725. Here worked several notable personalities of the Greek Enlightenment, such as Bessarion Makris, the priests Georgios Sougdouris (1685/7–1725) and Anastasios Papavasileiou (1715–?), the monk Methodios Anthrakites, his student Ioannis Vilaras and Kosmas Balanos. The Balaneios taught philosophy, theology and mathematics. It suffered financially from the dissolution of the Republic of Venice by the French and finally stopped operation in 1820. The school's library, which hosted several manuscripts and epigrams, was also burned the same year following the capture of Ioannina by the troops the Sultan had sent against Ali Pasha.

The Maroutses family, also active in Venice, founded the Maroutsaia School, which opened in 1742 and its first director Eugenios Voulgaris championed the study of the physical sciences (physics and chemistry) as well as philosophy and Greek. The Maroutsaia also suffered after the fall of Venice and closed in 1797 to be reopened as the Kaplaneios School thanks to a benefaction from an Ioannite living in Russia, Zoes Kaplanes. Its schoolmaster, Athanasios Psalidas had been a student of Methodios Anthrakites and had also studied in Vienna and in Russia. Psalidas established an important library of thousands of volumes in several languages and laboratories for the study of experimental physics and chemistry that aroused the interest and suspicion of Ali Pasha. The Kaplaneios was burned down along with most of the rest of the city after the entry of the Sultan's armies in 1820. These schools took over the long tradition of the Byzantine era, giving a significant boost to the Greek Enlightenment. "During the 18th century", Neophytos Doukas wrote with some exaggeration, "every author of the Greek world, was either from Ioannina or was a graduate of one of the city's schools."

==== Ali Pasha's rule (1788–1822) ====
In 1788 the city became the center of the territory ruled by Ali Pasha, an area that included the entire northwestern part of Greece, southern parts of Albania, Thessaly as well as parts of Euboea and the Peloponnese. The Ottoman-Albanian lord Ali Pasha was one of the most influential personalities of the region in the 18th and 19th centuries. Born in Tepelenë, he maintained diplomatic relations with the most important European leaders of the time and his court became a point of attraction for many of those restless minds who would become major figures of the Greek Revolution (Georgios Karaiskakis, Odysseas Androutsos, Markos Botsaris and others). During this time, however, Ali Pasha committed a number of atrocities against the Greek population of Ioannina, culminating in the sewing up of local women in sacks and drowning them in the nearby lake, this period of his rule coincides with the greatest economic and intellectual prosperity of the city. As a couplet has it "The city was first in arms, money and letters".

When the French scholar François Pouqueville visited the city during the early years of the 19th century, he counted 3,200 homes (2,000 Christian, 1,000 Muslim, 200 Jewish). The efforts of Ali Pasha to break away from the Sublime Porte alarmed the Ottoman government, and in 1820 (the year before the Greek War of Independence began) he was declared guilty of treason and Ioannina was besieged by Turkish troops. Ali Pasha was assassinated in 1822 in the monastery of St Panteleimon on the island of the lake, where he took refuge while waiting to be pardoned by Sultan Mahmud II.

==== Last Ottoman century (1822–1913) ====
The Zosimaia was the first significant educational foundation established after the outbreak of the Greek War of Independence (1828). It was financed by a benefaction from the Zosimas brothers and began operating in 1828 and fully probably from 1833. It was a School of Liberal Arts (Greek, Philosophy and Foreign Languages). The mansion of Angeliki Papazoglou became the Papazogleios school for girls as an endowment following her death; it operated until 1905.

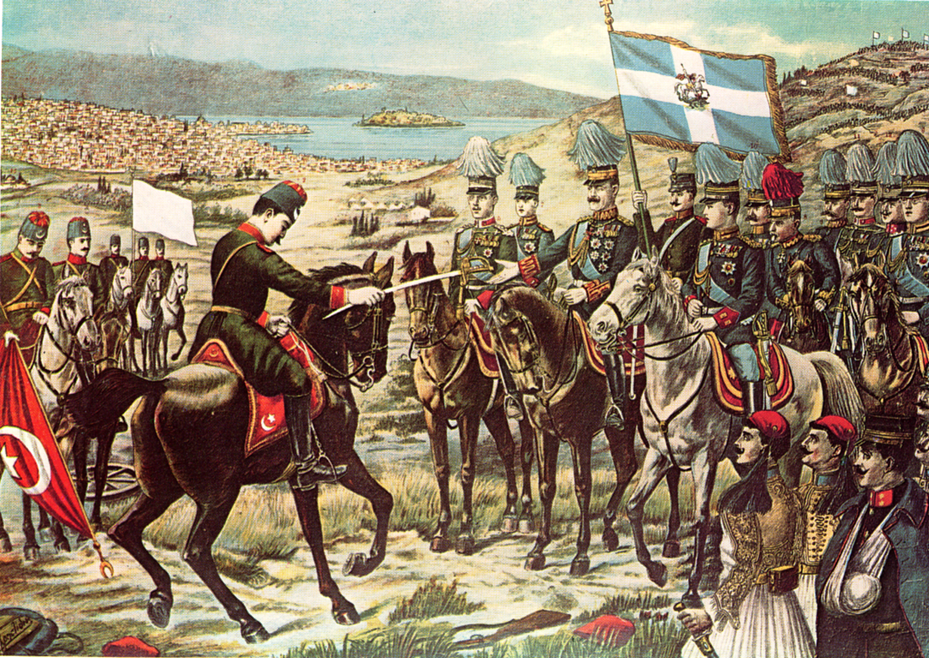
Greek lithography showing the surrender of Ioannina by Essat Pasha to the Greek Crown Prince future Constantine I during the First Balkan War.

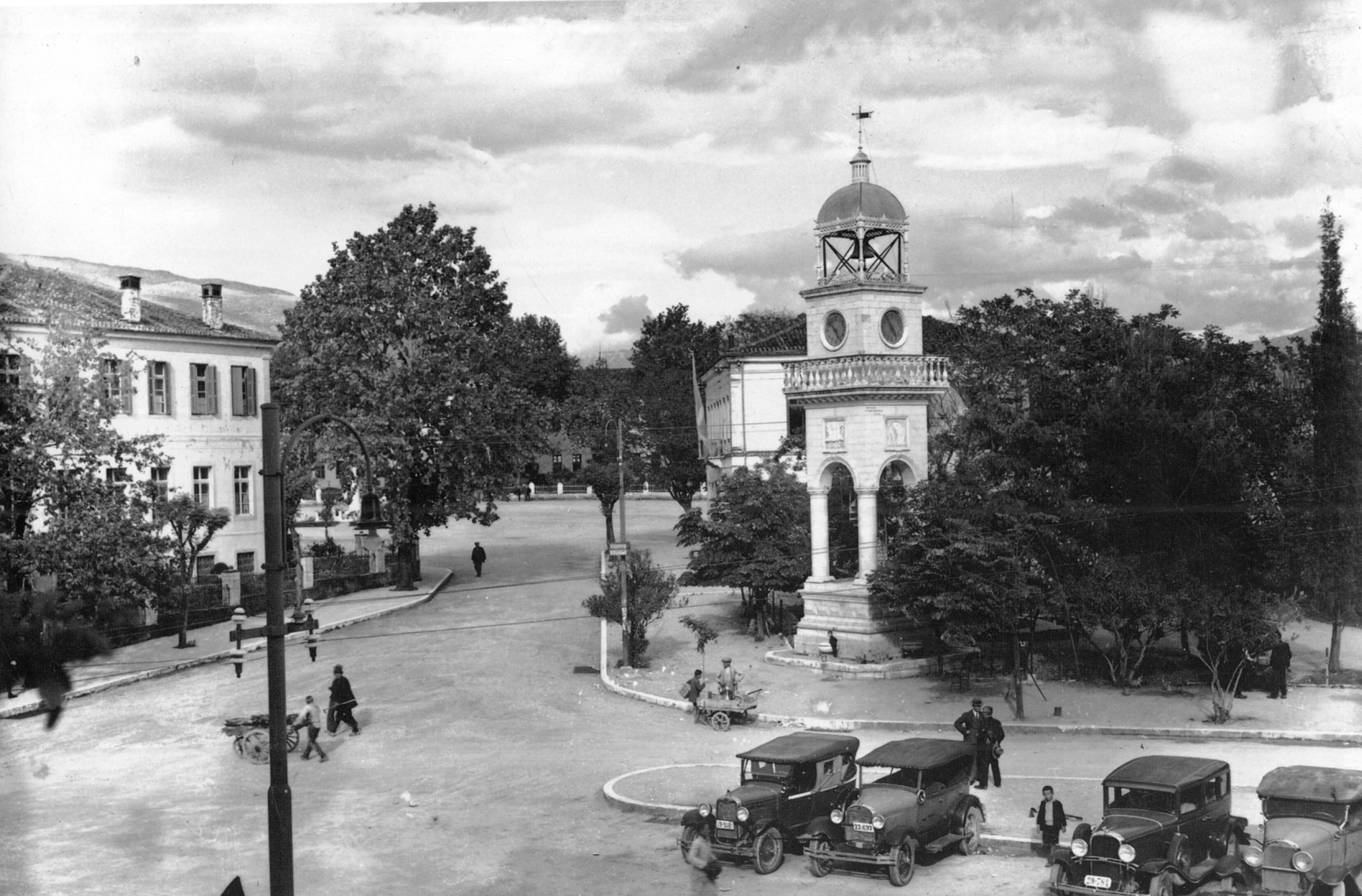
Ioannina's central square (1932)

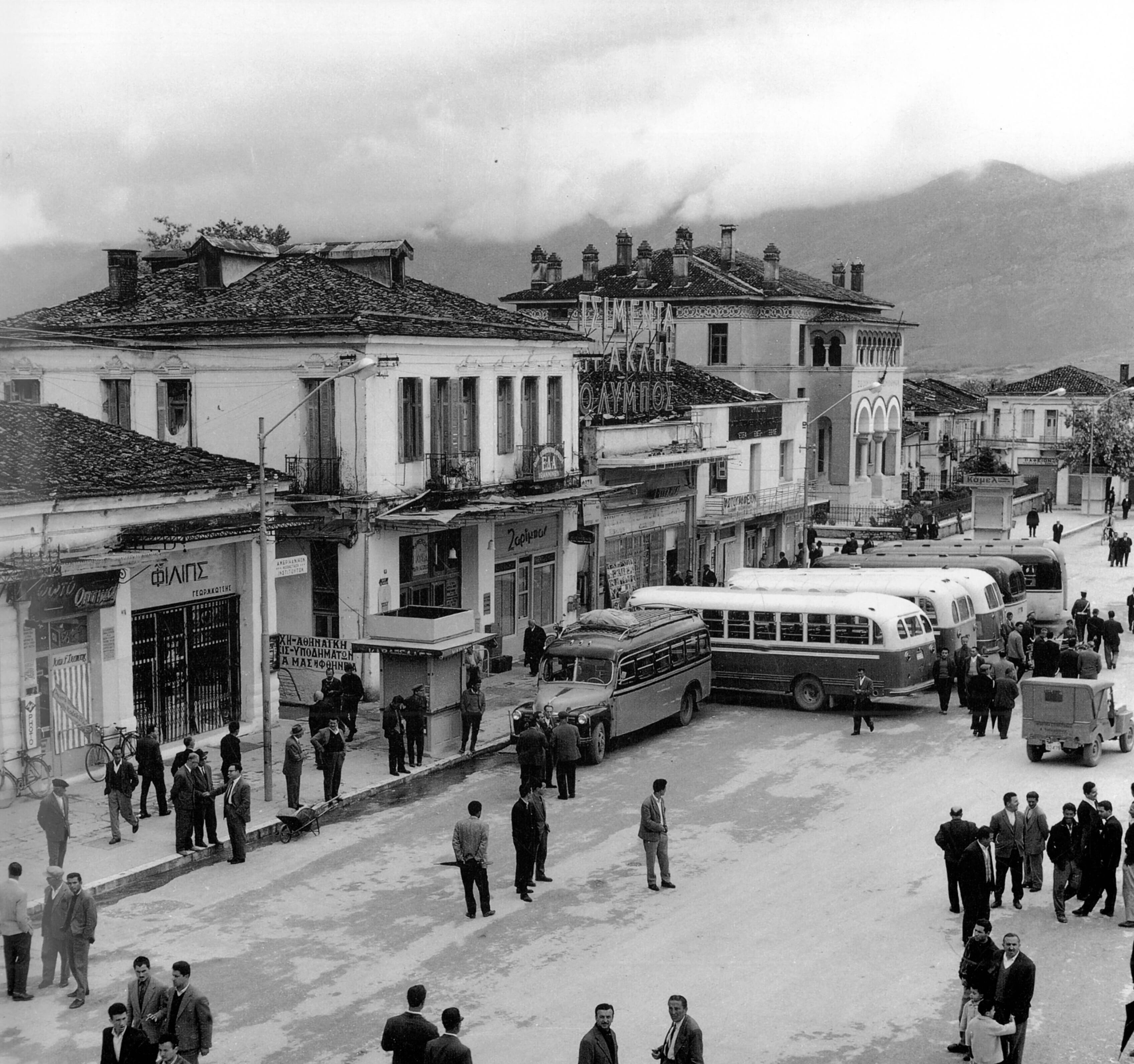
Main street (Dodonis Avenue) of the city (1940s or 1950s)

In 1869, a great part of Ioannina was destroyed by fire. The marketplace was soon reconstructed according to the plans of the German architect Holz, thanks to the personal interest of Ahmet Rashim Pasha, the local governor. Communities of people from Ioannina living abroad were active in financing the construction of most of the city's churches, schools and other elegant buildings of charitable establishments. The first bank of the Ottoman Empire, the Ottoman Bank, opened its first branch in Greece in Ioannina, which shows the power of the city in world trade in the 19th century. As the 19th century came to a close, signs of national agitation emerged among some parts of the city' s population. In 1877 for example, Albanian leaders sent a memorandum to the Ottoman government demanding, among other things, the establishment of Albanian language schools and various Muslim Albanians of the Vilayet formed in Ioannina a committee which aimed at defending Albanian rights, but it was inactive in general. The Greek population of the region authorized a committee to present to European governments their wish for union with Greece; as a result Dimitrios Chasiotis published a memorandum in Paris in 1879.

According to the Ottoman censuses of 1881–1893, the city and its environs (the central kaza of the Sanjak of Ioannina), had a population comprising 4,759 Muslims, 77,258 Greek Orthodox (including both Greek and Albanian speakers), 3,334 Jews and 207 of foreign nationality. While a number of Turkish-language schools were established at the time, Greek-language education retained its prominent position. Even the city's prominent Muslim families preferred to send their children to well-established Greek institutions, notably the Zosimaia. As a result, the dominance of the Greek language in the city continued: the minutes of the city council were kept in Greek, and the official newspaper, Vilayet, established in 1868, was bilingual in Turkish and Greek.

By 1908 an Albanian association was already active in Ioannina with the goal of removing the Albanian schools and churches of Ioaninna from the Greek's Patriarchate sphere of influence.

During the Ottoman period (turcokracy) the religious-linguistic minority of "Turco-yanniotes" (Τουρκογιαννιώτες) existed in Ioannina and neighbouring areas. These were islamized "Yaniotes" (= people from Ioannina), who spoke Greek. There is a limited number of texts written with Greek alphabet in their idiom.

=== Modern period (since 1913) ===
Ioannina was incorporated into the Greek state on 21 February 1913 after the Battle of Bizani in the First Balkan War. The day the city came under the control of the Greek forces, aviator Christos Adamidis, a native of the city, landed his Maurice Farman MF.7 biplane in the Town Hall square, to the adulation of an enthusiastic crowd.

Following the Asia Minor Catastrophe (1922) and the Treaty of Lausanne, the Muslim population was exchanged with Greek refugees from Asia Minor. A small Muslim community of Albanian origin continued to live in Ioannina after the exchange, which in 1940 counted 20 families and had decreased to 8 individuals in 1973.

In 1940 during World War II the capture of the city became one of the major objectives of the Italian Army. Nevertheless, the Greek defense in Kalpaki pushed back the invading Italians. In April 1941 Ioannina was intensively bombed by the German forces even during the negotiations that led to the capitulation of the Greek army. During the subsequent Axis occupation of Greece, the city's Jewish community was rounded up by the Germans in 1944 and mostly perished in the concentration camps. On 3 October 1943, the German army murdered in reprisal nearly 100 people in the village of Lingiades, 13 kilometres distant from Ioaninna, in what is known as the Lingiades massacre.

The University of Ioannina was founded in 1970; until then, higher education faculties in the city had been part of the Aristotle University of Thessaloniki.

An informal meeting of the foreign ministers of the states of the European Union took place in Ioannina on 27 March 1994, resulting in the Ioannina compromise.

== Jewish community ==
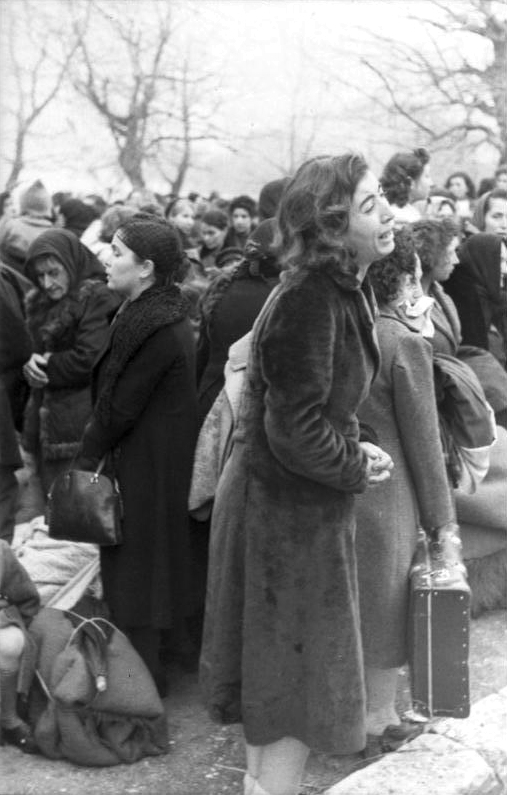
A young woman cries during the deportation of women and children of the Jewish community, March 1944.

According to the local Greek scholar Panayiotis Aravantinos, a synagogue destroyed in the 18th century bore an inscription which dated its foundation in the late 9th century AD. The existing synagogue was built in 1829 and is known as the Old Synagogue. It is located in the old fortified part of the city known as "Kastro", at 16 Ioustinianou street. Its architecture is typical of the Ottoman era, a large building made of stone. The interior of the synagogue is laid out in the Romaniote way: the bimah (where the Torah scrolls are read out during service) is on a raised dais on the western wall, the Aron haKodesh (where the Torah scrolls are kept) is on the eastern wall and at the middle there is a wide interior aisle. The names of the Ioanniote Jews who were killed in the Holocaust are engraved in stone on the walls of the synagogue.

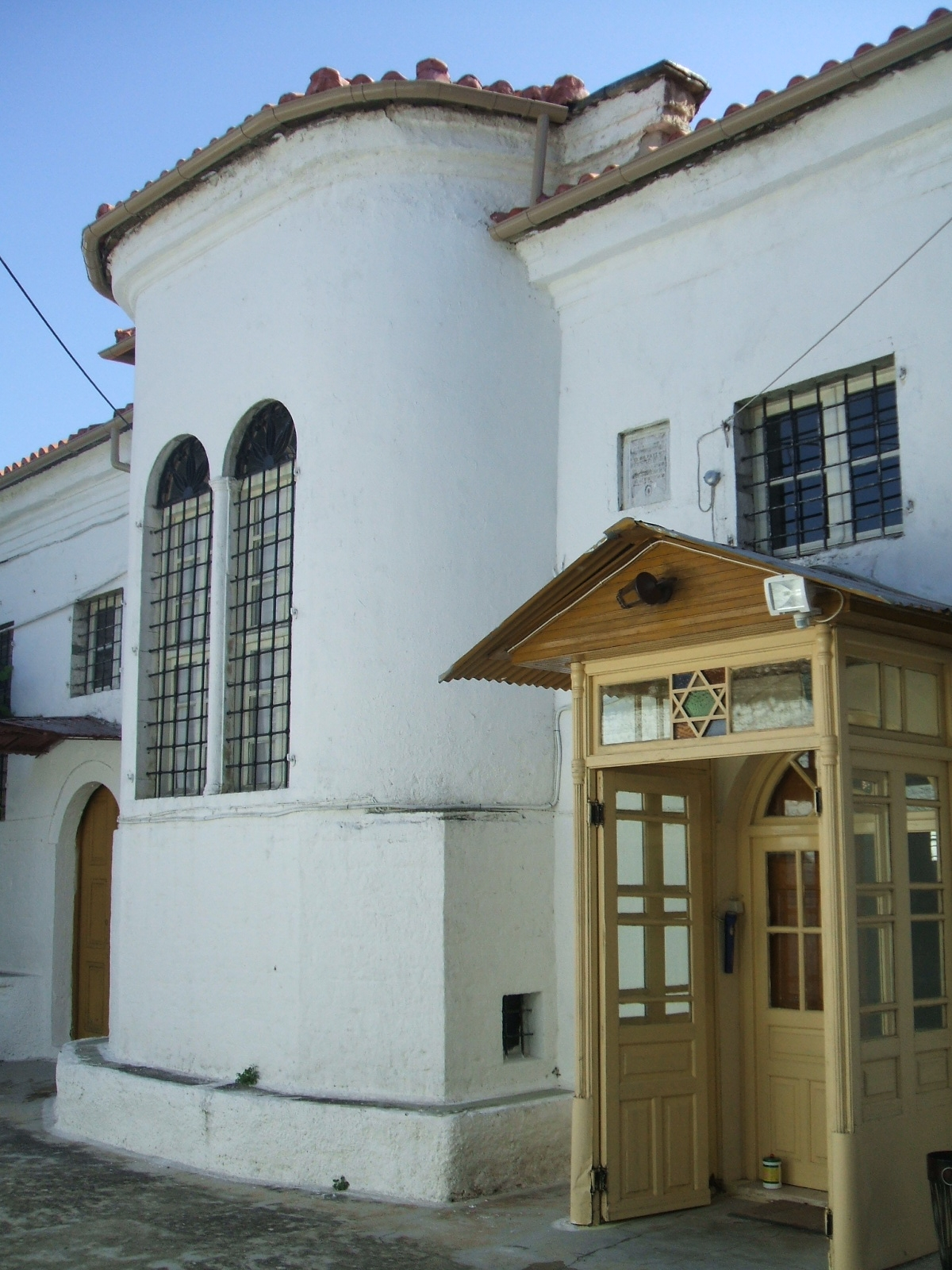
The old synagogue of the city

There was a Romaniote Jewish community living in Ioannina before World War II, in addition to a very small number of Sephardi. Many emigrated to New York, founding a congregation in 1906 and the Kehila Kedosha Janina synagogue in 1927.

Inside the old synagogue

According to Rae Dalven, 1,950 Jews were living in Ioannina in April 1941. Of these, 1,870 were deported by the Nazis to concentration camps on 25 March 1944, during the final months of German occupation. Almost all of the people deported were murdered on or shortly after 11 April 1944, when the train carrying them reached Auschwitz-Birkenau. Only 181 Ioannina Jews are known to have survived the war, including 112 who survived Auschwitz and 69 who fled to join the resistance leader Napoleon Zervas and the National Republican Greek League (EDES). Approximately 164 of these survivors eventually returned to Ioannina.

As of 2008, the remaining community has shrunk to about 50 mostly elderly people. The Kehila Kedosha Yashan Synagogue remains locked, only opened for visitors on request. Emigrant Romaniotes return every summer and open the old synagogue. The last time a Bar Mitzvah (the Jewish ritual for celebrating the coming of age of a child) was held in the synagogue was in 2000, and was an exceptional event for the community. A monument dedicated to the thousands of Greek Jews who perished during the Holocaust was constructed in the city in a 13th-century Jewish cemetery. In 2003 the memorial was vandalized by unknown anti-Semites. The Jewish cemetery too was repeatedly vandalized in 2009. As a response to the vandalisms, citizens of the city formed an initiative for the protection of the cemetery and organized rallies.

In the municipal election of 2019, independent candidate Moses Elisaf, a 65-year-old doctor, was elected mayor of the city, the first Jewish elected mayor in Greece. Elisaf won 50.3 percent of the vote. Elisaf received 17,789 votes, 235 more than his runoff opponent.

== Geography ==
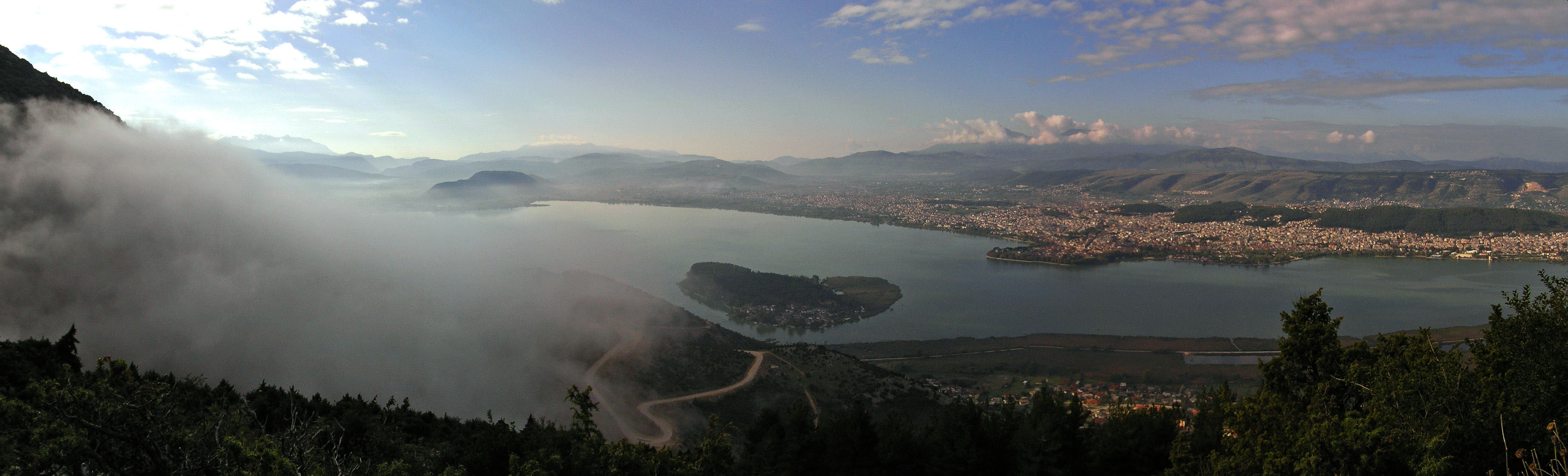
The city of Ioannina and Lake Pamvotis, as seen from the Mitsikeli mountain road.

Ioannina lies at an elevation of approximately 500 metres (1,640 feet) above sea level, on the western shore of Lake Pamvotis (Παμβώτις). It is located within the Ioannina municipality, and is the capital of Ioannina regional unit and the region of Epirus. Ioannina is located 436 km (271 mi) northwest of Athens, 290 kilometres (180 miles) southwest of Thessaloniki and 90 km (56 miles) east of the port of Igoumenitsa in the Ionian Sea.

The municipality Ioannina has an area of 403.322 km^{2}, the municipal unit Ioannina has an area of 47.440 km^{2}, and the community Ioannina (the city proper) has an area of 17.335 km^{2}.

=== Districts ===
The present municipality Ioannina was formed at the 2011 local government reform by the merger of the following 6 former municipalities, that became municipal units (constituent communities in brackets):

- Ioannina (Ioannina, Exochi, Marmara, Neochoropoulo, Stavraki)
- Anatoli (Anatoli, Bafra, Neokaisareia)
- Bizani (Ampeleia, Bizani, Asvestochori, Kontsika, Kosmira, Manoliasa, Pedini)
- Ioannina Island (Greek: Nisos Ioanninon)
- Pamvotida (Katsikas, Anatoliki, Vasiliki, Dafnoula, Drosochori, Iliokali, Kastritsa, Koutselio, Krapsi, Longades, Mouzakaioi, Platania, Platanas, Charokopi)
- Perama (Perama, Amfithea, Kranoula, Krya, Kryovrysi, Ligkiades, Mazia, Perivleptos, Spothoi)

=== Climate ===
Ioannina has a borderline hot-summer Mediterranean climate (Csa) and humid subtropical climate (Cfa) in the Köppen climate classification, with somewhat wetter summers than nearby coastal areas, tempered by its inland location and elevation. Summers are typically hot and moderately dry, while winters are wet and colder than on the coast with frequent frosts and occasional snowfall. Ioannina is the wettest city in mainland Greece with over 50,000 inhabitants. The absolute maximum temperature ever recorded was 42.4 °C (108 °F), while the absolute minimum ever recorded was −13 °C (9 °F).

Climate data for Ioannina (475 m; 1956–2010)
Month	Jan	Feb	Mar	Apr	May	Jun	Jul	Aug	Sep	Oct	Nov	Dec	Year
Mean daily maximum °C (°F)	9.0 (48.2)	10.4 (50.7)	13.7 (56.7)	17.5 (63.5)	23.0 (73.4)	27.7 (81.9)	31.0 (87.8)	31.0 (87.8)	26.1 (79.0)	20.6 (69.1)	14.7 (58.5)	10.0 (50.0)	20.0 (68.0)
Daily mean °C (°F)	4.7 (40.5)	6.1 (43.0)	8.8 (47.8)	12.4 (54.3)	17.4 (63.3)	21.9 (71.4)	24.8 (76.6)	24.3 (75.7)	20.1 (68.2)	14.9 (58.8)	9.7 (49.5)	5.9 (42.6)	14.3 (57.7)
Mean daily minimum °C (°F)	0.2 (32.4)	1.0 (33.8)	3.2 (37.8)	6.1 (43.0)	9.8 (49.6)	13.0 (55.4)	15.2 (59.4)	15.3 (59.5)	12.2 (54.0)	8.6 (47.5)	4.8 (40.6)	1.7 (35.1)	7.5 (45.5)
Average precipitation mm (inches)	122.5 (4.82)	112.5 (4.43)	94.9 (3.74)	76.5 (3.01)	66.9 (2.63)	44.1 (1.74)	31.7 (1.25)	30.2 (1.19)	62.4 (2.46)	107.5 (4.23)	168.8 (6.65)	171.3 (6.74)	1,089.3 (42.89)
Average precipitation days	13.3	12.4	12.8	12.6	11.0	6.9	4.8	4.8	6.5	9.7	13.7	15.2	123.7
Average relative humidity (%)	76.9	73.7	69.5	67.9	65.9	59.1	52.4	54.4	63.6	70.8	79.8	81.5	68.0
Mean monthly sunshine hours	95.3	107.9	143.4	165.2	225.2	296.0	320.7	296.0	208.2	160.4	98.1	75.2	2,191.6
Source: Greek National Weather Service

== Demography ==
According to the 2021 census the resident population fell by 4.2%. Men constitute 48.9% and women 51.1% of the total population.

Population censuses, 1981–2021
Year	Town	Municipal unit	Municipality	Men	Women
1913	16,804	–	–		
1920	20,765	–	–		
1928	20,485	–	–		
1940	21,887	–	–		
1951	32,315	–	–		
1961	34,997	–	–		
1971	40,130	–	–		
1981	44,829	–	–		
1991	56,699	–	–		
2001	67,384	–	75,550		
2011	65,574	80,371	112,486	53,975	58,511
2021	64,896	81,627	113,978	54,951	59,027

== Landmarks and sights ==
=== Isle of Lake Pamvotis ===
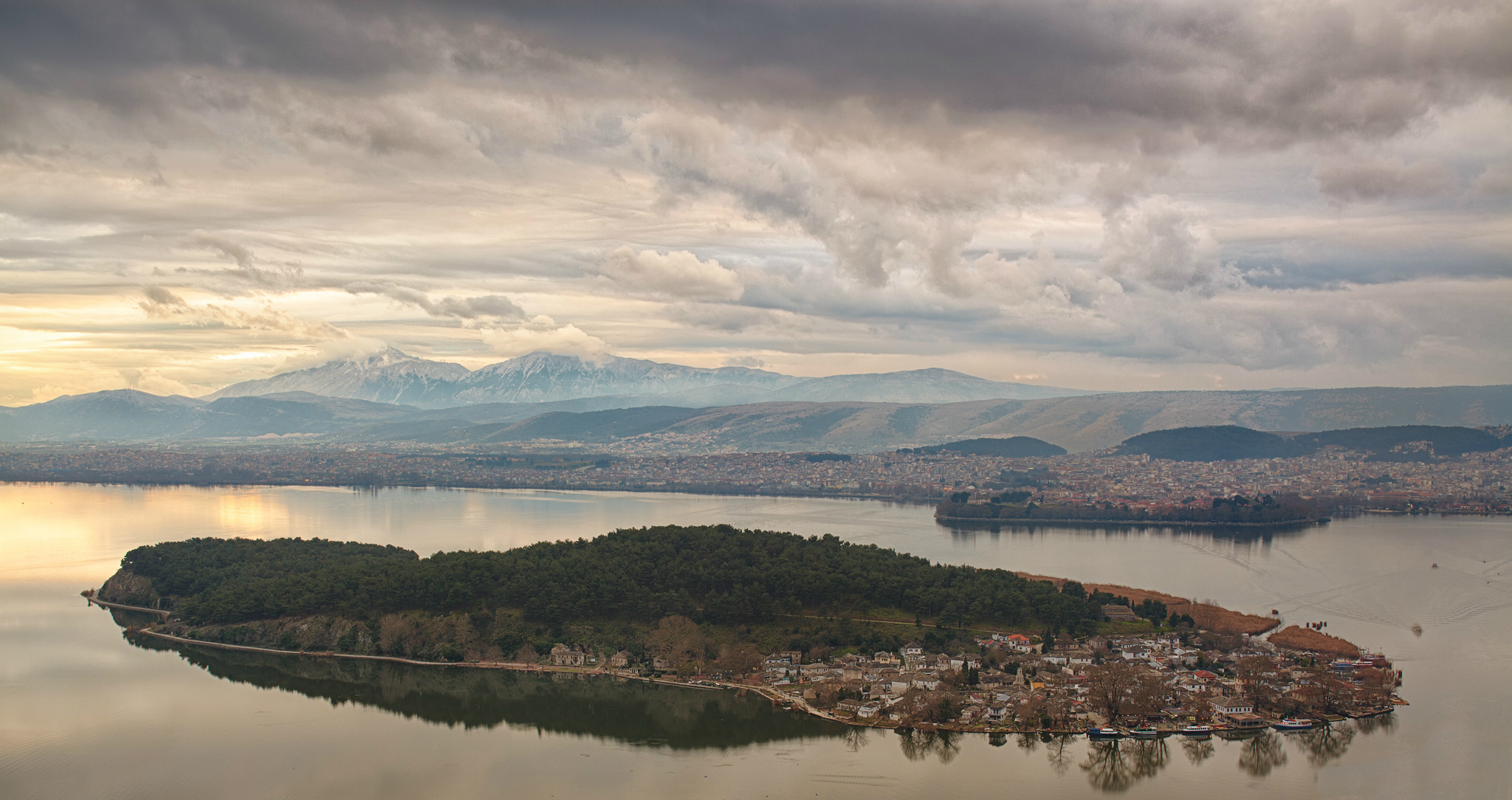
Ioannina Island in the lake

One of the most notable attractions of Ioannina is the inhabited island of Lake Pamvotis which is simply referred to as Island of Ioannina. The island is a short ferry trip from the mainland and can be reached on small motorboats running on varying frequencies depending on the season. The monastery of St Panteleimon, where Ali Pasha spent his last days waiting for a pardon from the Sultan, is now a museum housing everyday artefacts and relics of his period. There are six monasteries on the island: the monastery of St Nicholas (Ntiliou) or Strategopoulou (11th century), the Monastery of St Nicholas (Spanou) or Philanthropinon (1292), St John the Baptist (1506), Eleousis (1570), St Panteleimon (17th century), and of the Transfiguration of Christ (1851). The monasteries of Strategopoulou and Philanthropinon also functioned as colleges. Alexios Spanos, the monks Proklos and Comnenos, and the Apsarades brothers Theophanis and Nektarios are among those that taught there. The school continued its activities until 1758, when it was superseded by the newer collegial institutions within the city. The island's winding streets are also home to many gift-shops, tavernas, churches and bakeries.

=== Ioannina Castle ===
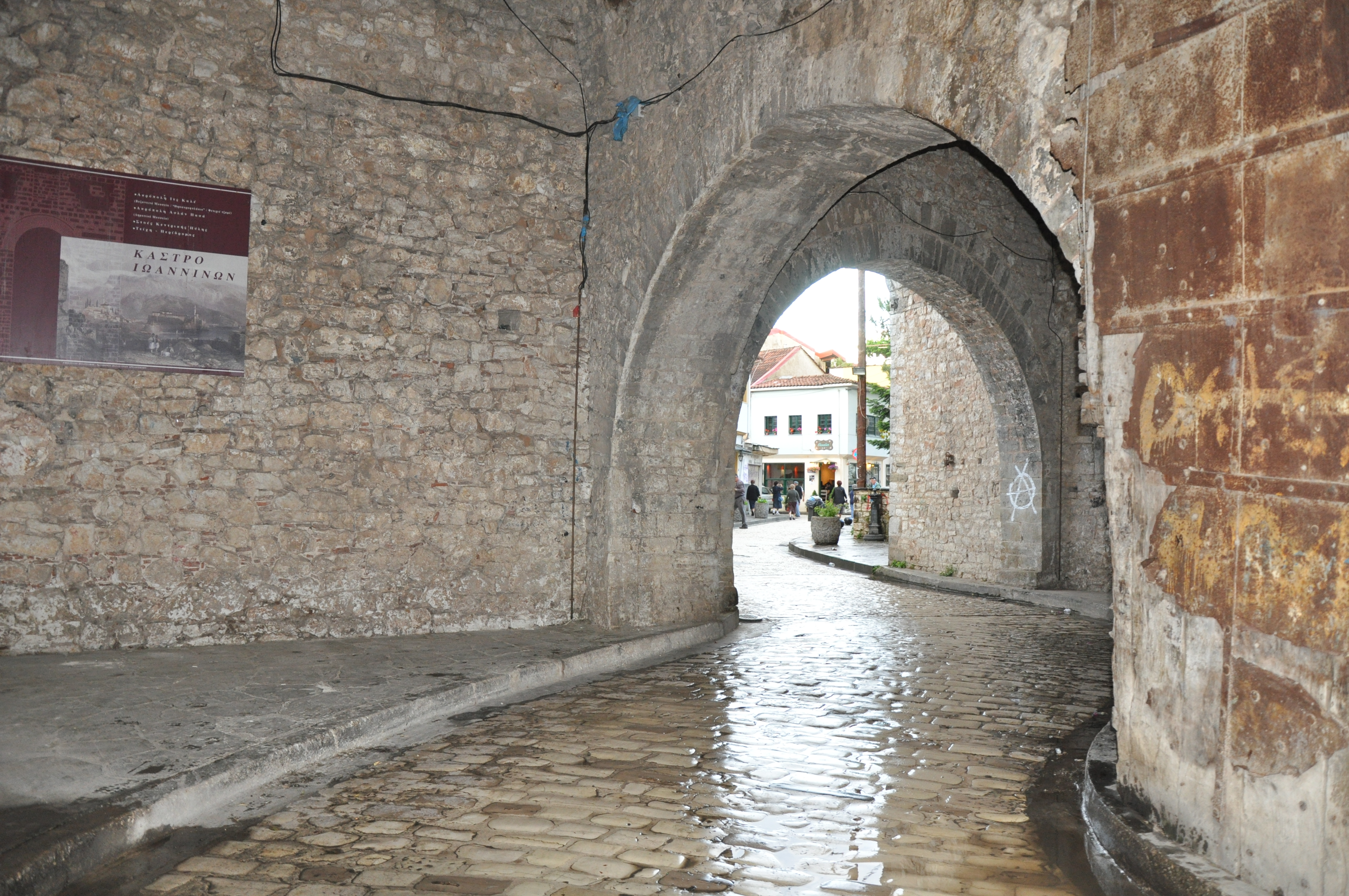
A gate of the castle

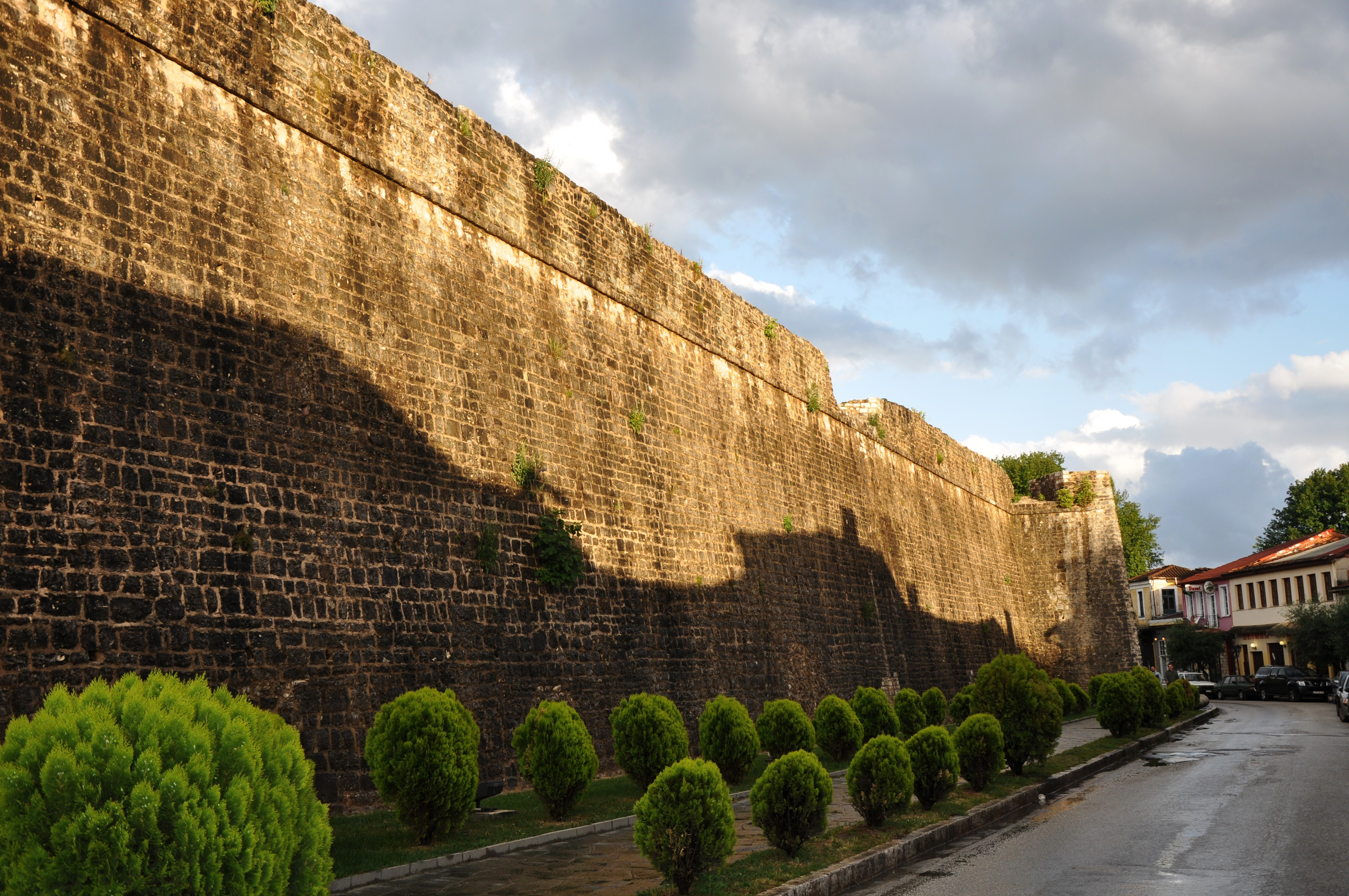
Wall of the castle

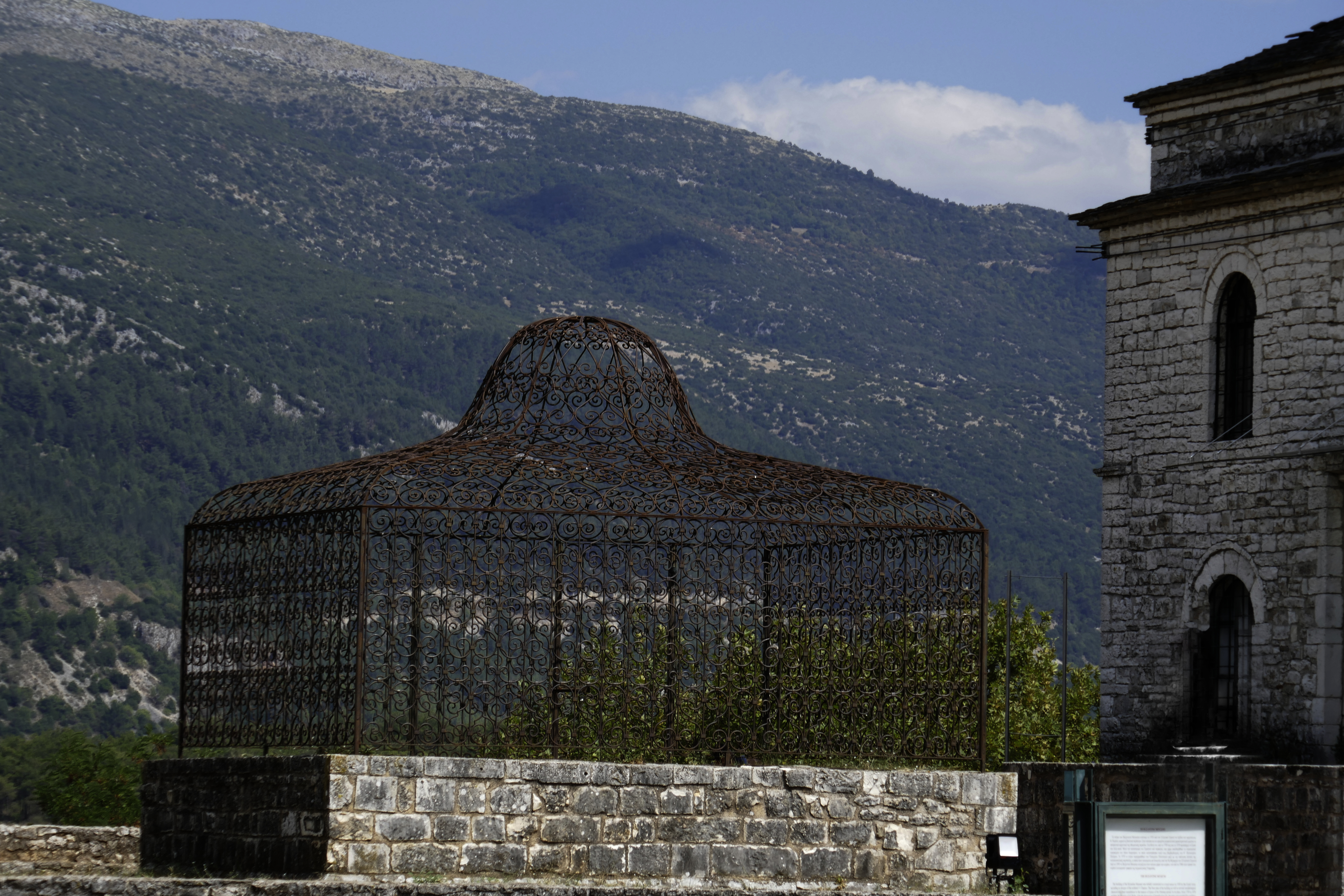
Tomb of Ali Pasha

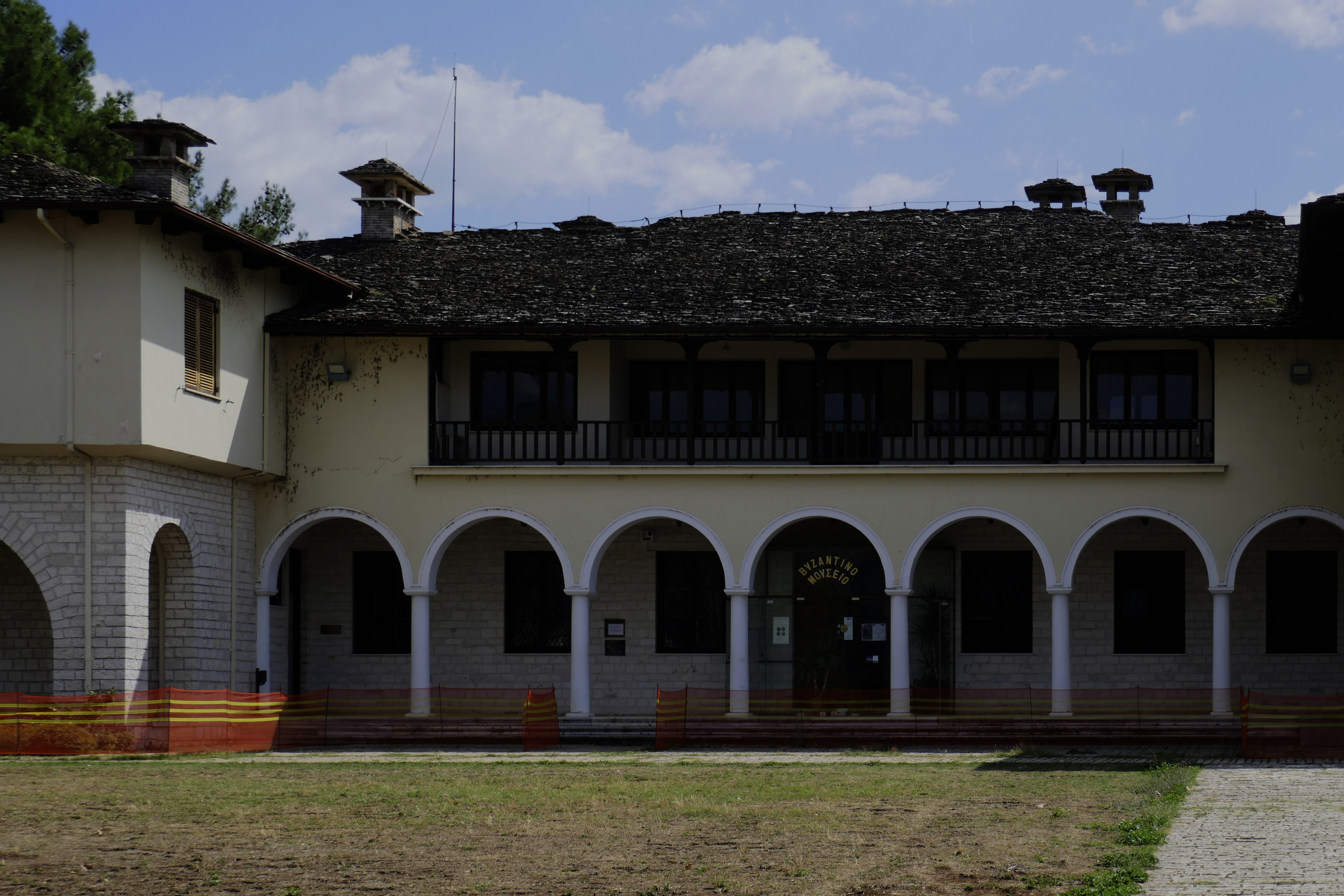
Byzantine museum

At the south-eastern edge of the town on a rocky peninsula of Lake Pamvotis, the castle was the administrative heart of the Despotate of Epirus, and the Ottoman vilayet. The castle was in constant use until the late Ottoman period and the fortifications underwent several modifications throughout the centuries. The most extensive alterations where conducted during the rule of Ali Pasha and were completed in 1815. Several monuments such as the Byzantine baths, the Ottoman baths, the Ottoman library, and the Soufari Sarai are found within the castle's walls. There are two citadels in the castle. The south-eastern citadel, which bears the name Its Kale (Ιτς Καλέ, from Turkish Iç Kale, 'inner fortress') is where the Fethiye Mosque, the tomb of Ali Pasha, and the Byzantine Museum are located. The north-eastern citadel is dominated by the Aslan Pasha Mosque and also contains a few other monuments dating from the Ottoman period. The old Jewish Synagogue of Ioannina is within the walls of the castle and is one of the oldest and largest buildings of its type surviving in Greece.

=== The city ===
Several religious and secular monuments survive from the Ottoman period. In addition to the two mosques surviving within the walls of the castle, two further mosques are preserved outside the walls. The Mosque and Madrassa of Veli Pasha are in the centre of the city, and Kaloutsiani Mosque can be found in the area of the city with the same name. The now derelict "House of the Archbishop", near the football stadium, is the only old mansion that survived the fire of 1820. Some of the notable landmarks in the city centre also date from the late Ottoman period. The municipal clock tower of Ioannina, designed by local architect Periklis Meliritos, was erected in 1905 to celebrate the Jubilee of sultan Abdul Hamid II. The adjacent building houses the VIII Division headquarters. It dates from the late 19th century. Some neoclassical buildings such the post office, the old Zosimaia School, the Papazogleios Weaving School, and the former Commercial School date from the late Ottoman period as do a few arcades in the old commercial centre of the city like Stoa Louli and Stoa Liampei. The churches of the Assumption of the Virgin at Perivleptos, Saint Nicholas of Kopanon and Saint Marina were rebuilt in the 1850s by funds from Nikolaos Zosimas and his brothers on the foundations of previous churches that perished in the great fire of 1820. The Cathedral of St Athanasius was completed in 1933. It was built on the foundations of the previous Orthodox cathedral which was destroyed in the fires of 1820. It is a three-aisled basilica.

== Culture ==
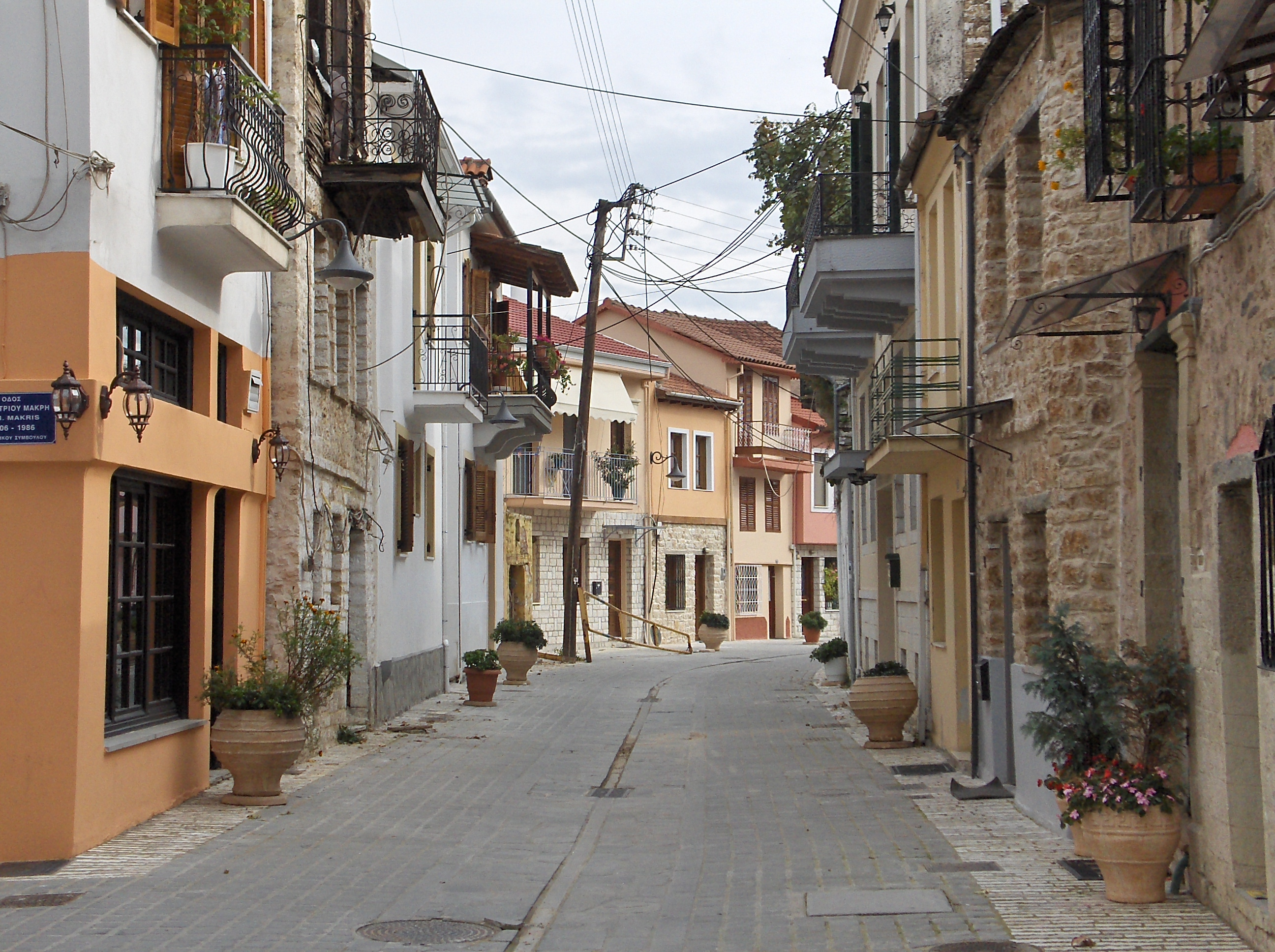
Street near the castle

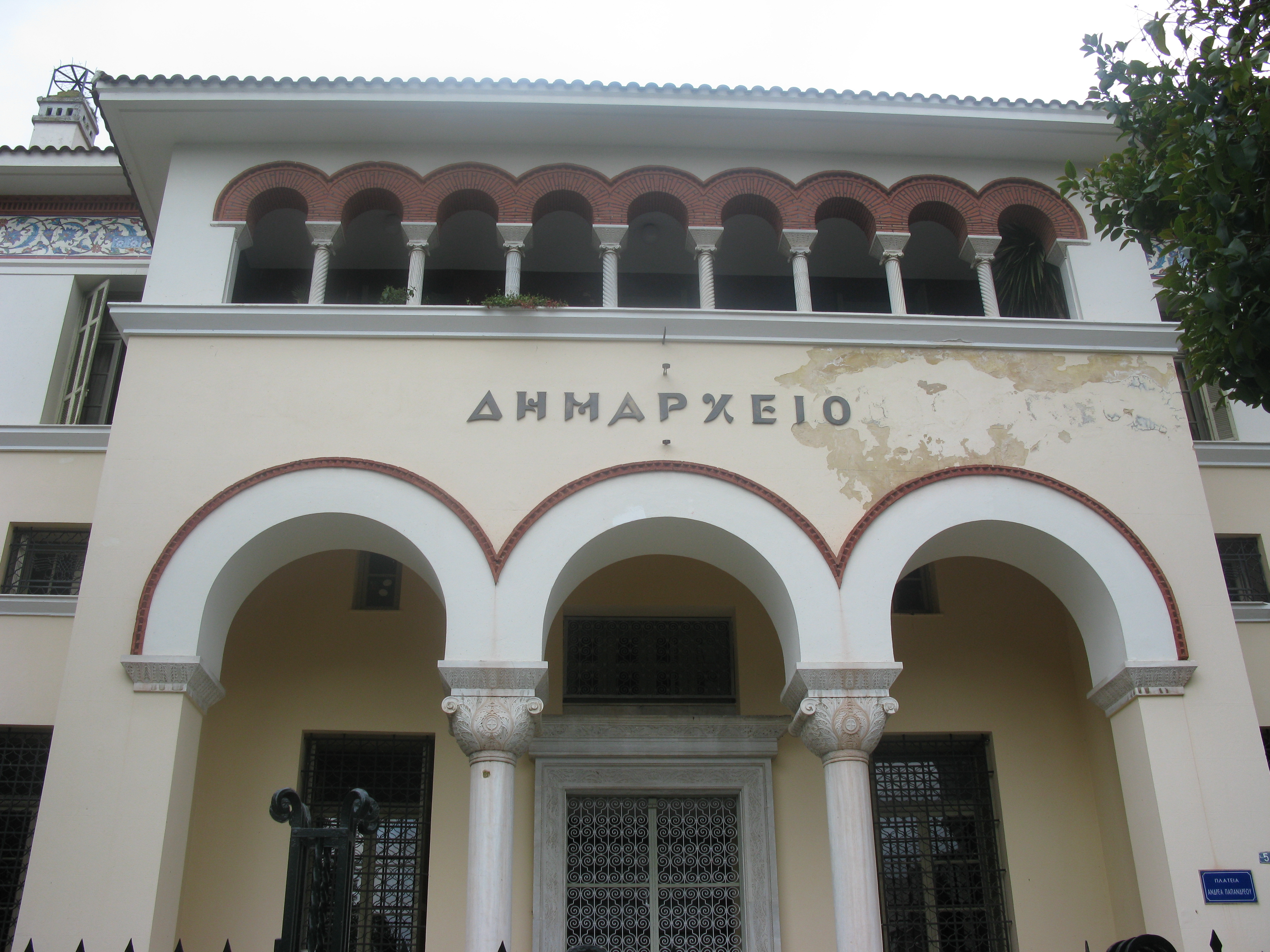
The city hall

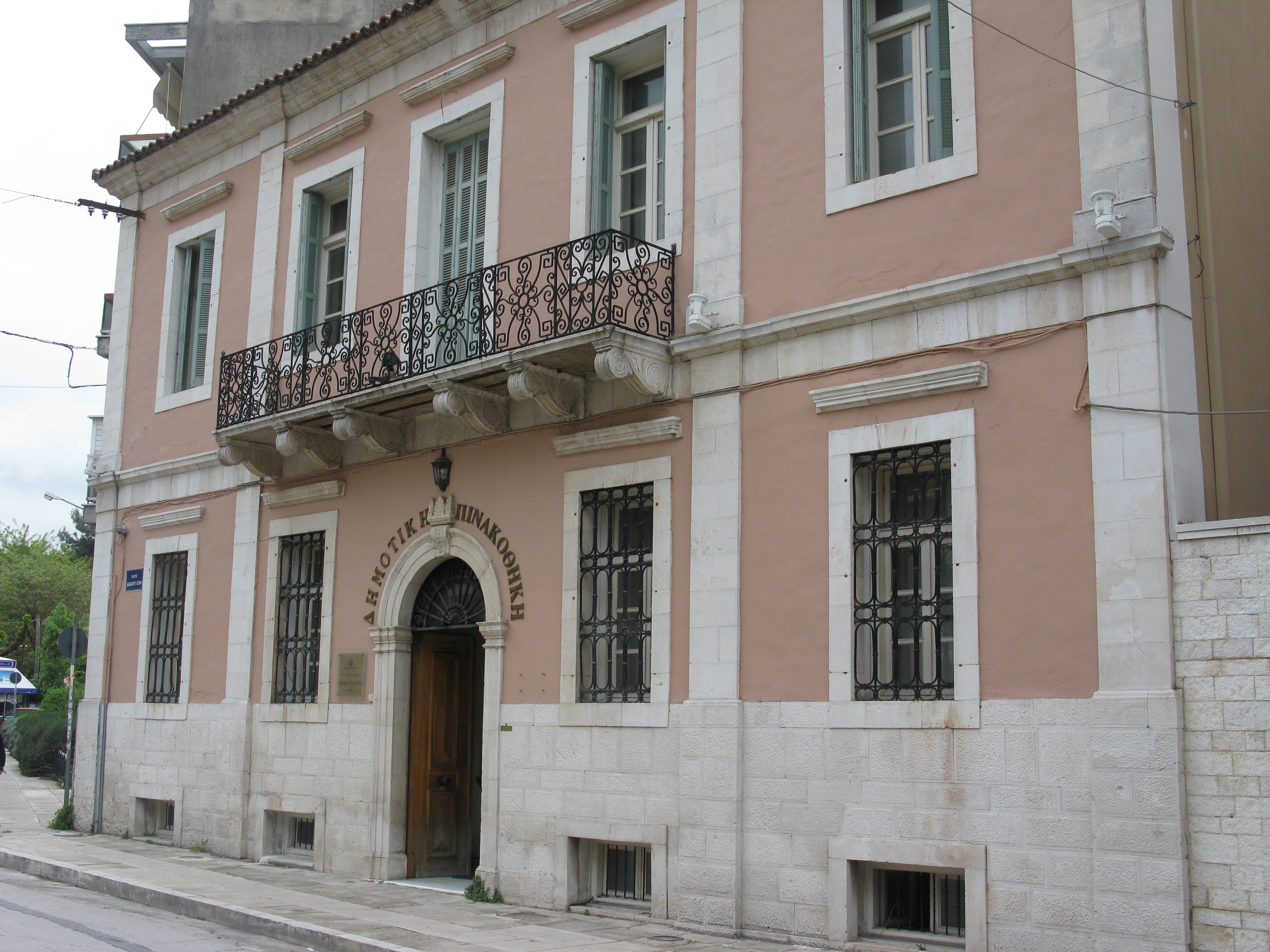
Municipal Art Gallery of Ioannina

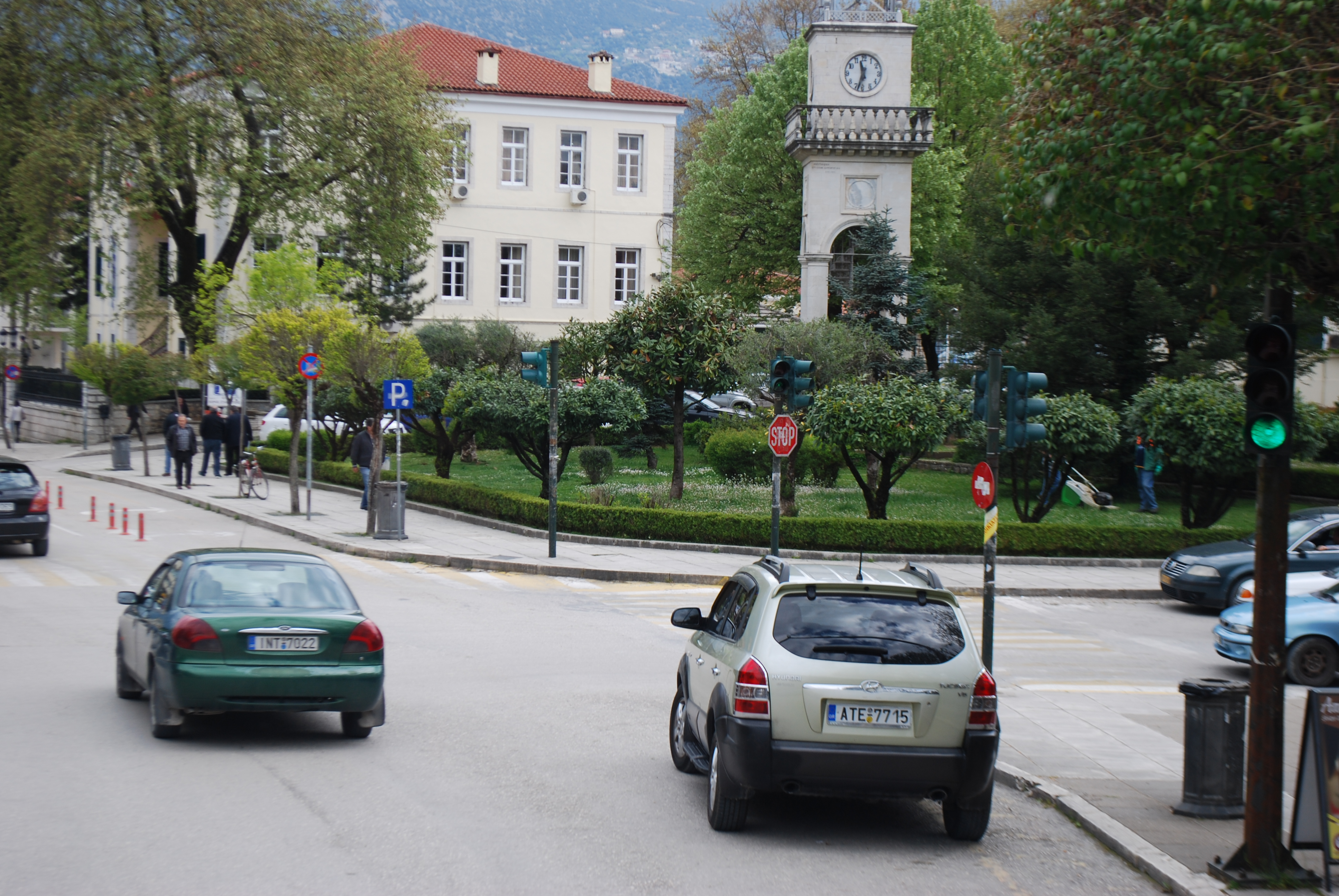
Road to the clocktower, Averof street

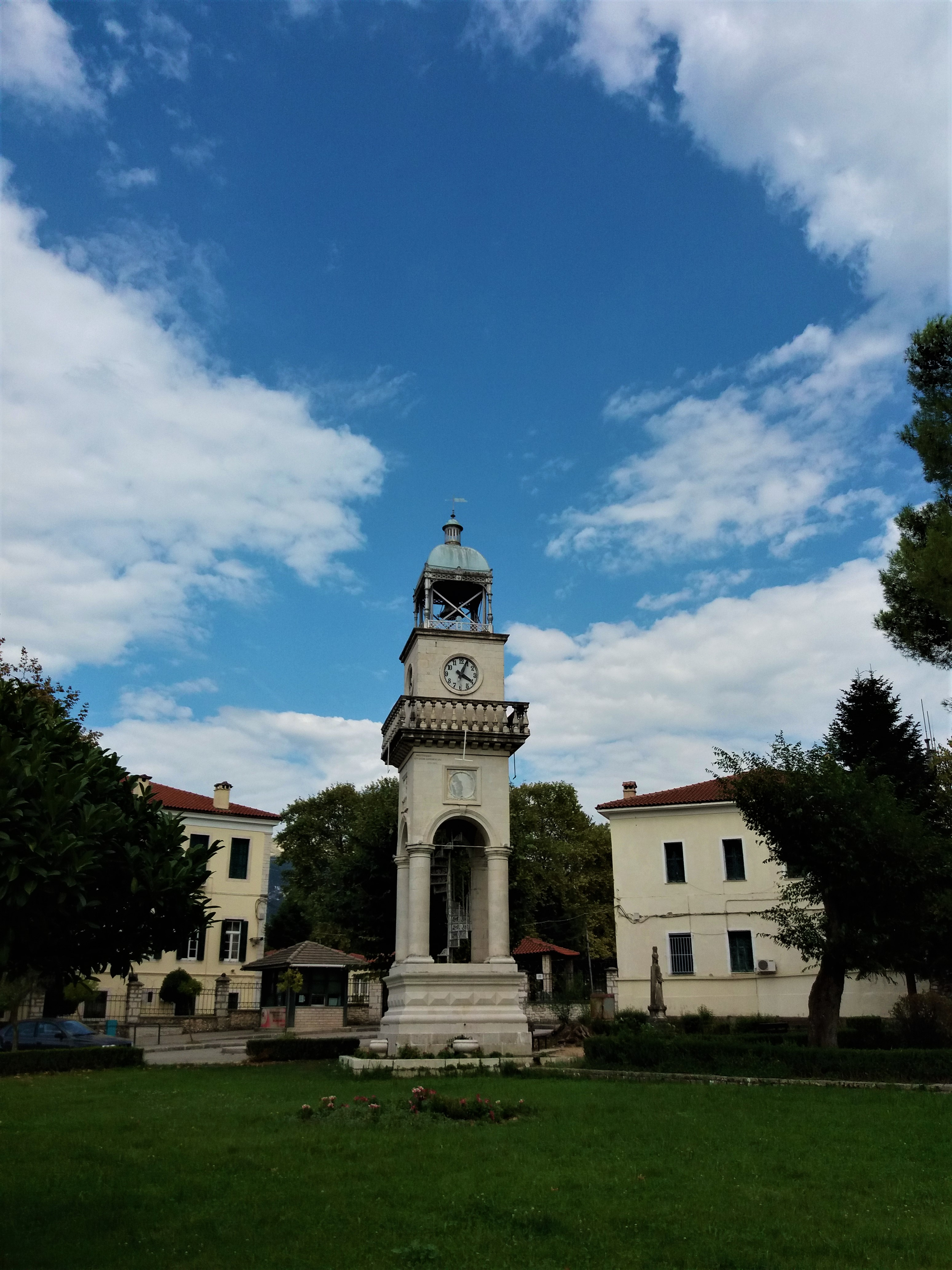
Clocktower in central Dimokratias Square

=== Museums and galleries ===
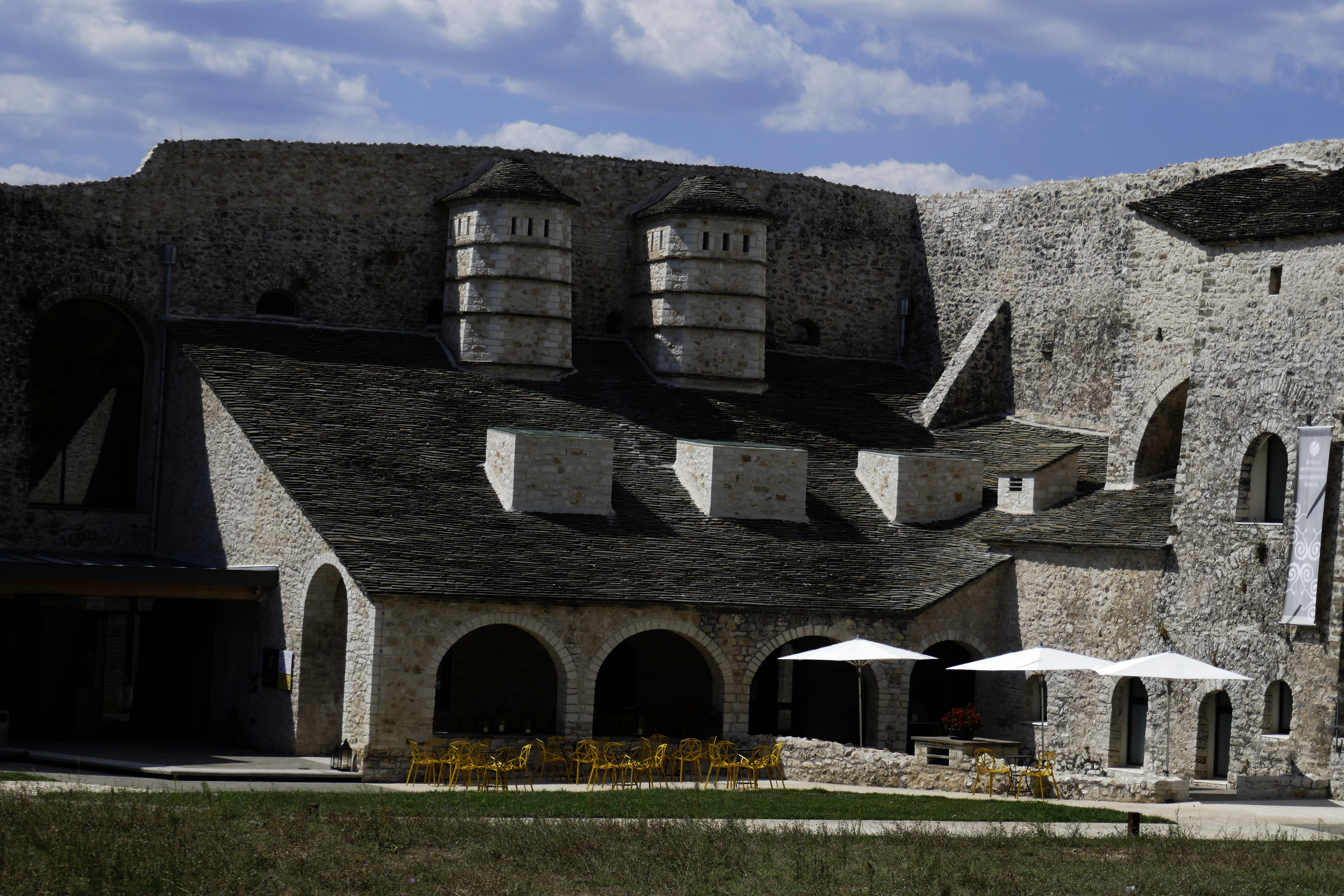
Silversmithing museum

Some of the most important museums of the city are within the walls of the castle. The Municipal Ethnographic Museum is hosted in Aslan Pasha Mosque in the north-east citadel. It is divided into three departments, each one representing one of the main communities that inhabited the city: Greek, Muslim, and Jewish. The Byzantine Museum is in the south-eastern citadel of the castle. The museum opened in 1995 in order to preserve and present artefacts of the wider region of Epirus covering the period from the 4th to the 19th century. The newest addition to the city's museum, the silversmithing museum, is also in the south-eastern citadel. It is housed in the western bastion of the citadel and outlines the history of the art of silversmithing in Epirus. Outside the walls of the castle, close to the town centre, one will find the Archaeological Museum of Ioannina. It is in the Litharitsia fortress area. It includes archaeological exhibits documenting the human habitation of Epirus from prehistoric times through the late Roman Period, with special emphasis placed on finds from the Dodona sanctuary. The Municipal Art Gallery of Ioannina (Dimotiki Pinakothiki) is housed in the Pyrsinella neoclassical building dating from around 1890. The gallery's collection displays major modern works of painters and sculptors, collected through purchases and donations from various collectors and artists. This includes about 500 works, paintings, drawings, prints, pictures and sculptures. The Pavlos Vrellis Greek History Museum is 10 kilometres (6.2 mi) south of the city. It is a wax museum which covers events and personalities from Greek history as well as the history of the region and is the result of the personal work of Pavlos Vrellis.

=== Exhibitions ===
A digital art exhibition, Plásmata II, was organised by the Onassis Cultural Center in the lakeside of Pamvotis, in the summer of 2023. More than 100,000 people visited the exhibition. It is a new entry for the city and future actions in every area with the help of Onassis Cultural Center.

== Education ==
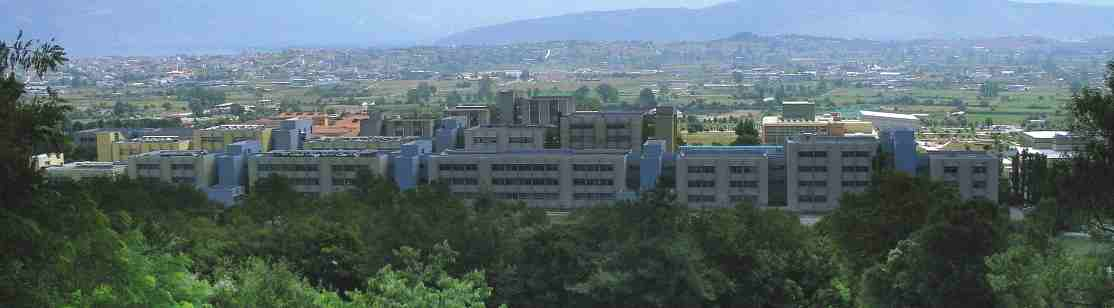
Buildings of the University of Ioannina

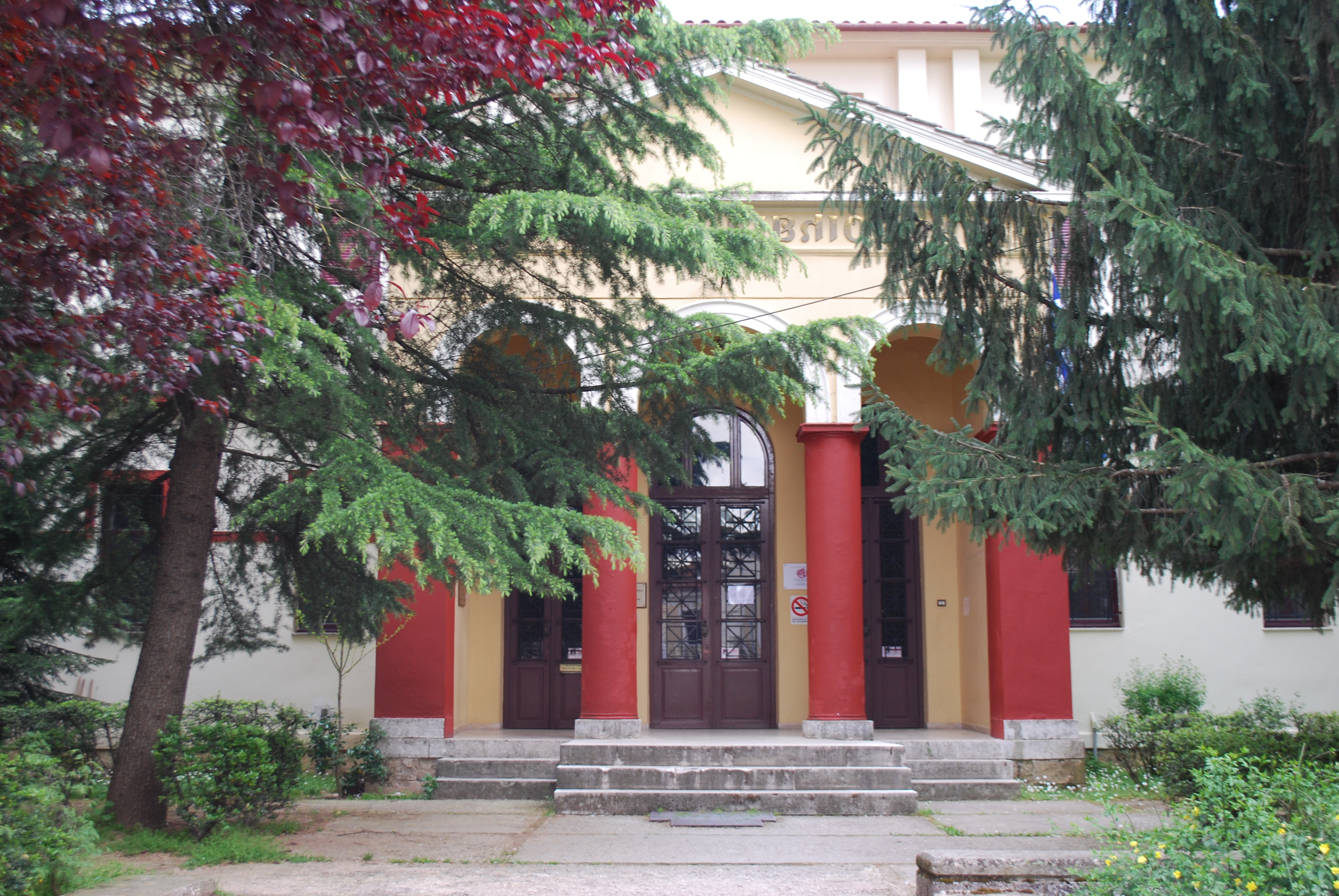
Entrance of Zosimaia Library

The University of Ioannina (Greek: Πανεπιστήμιο Ιωαννίνων, Panepistimio Ioanninon) is a university five kilometres southwest of Ioannina. The university was founded in 1964, as a charter of the Aristotle University of Thessaloniki and became an independent university in 1970. Today, the university is one of the leading academic institutions in Greece.

As of 2017, there was a student population of 25,000 enrolled at the university (21,900 at the undergraduate level and 3,200 at the postgraduate level) and 580 faculty members, while teaching is further supplemented by 171 teaching fellows and 132 laboratory staff. The university administrative services are staffed with 420 employees.

== Local products ==
- Ioannina is known throughout Greece for its silverwork, with a number of shops selling silver jewelry, bronzeware, and decorative items (serving trays, recreations of shields and swords).

=== Cuisine ===
- The area is famous for its spring water from Zagori, sold throughout Greece.
- The region of Ioannina is well known for the production of feta cheese.
- Ioannina is also famous for its baklava.
- Frog and eel, especially famous on Ioannina Island.

== Media ==
- Epirus TV1
- Ipirotikos Agon, a locally published newspaper
- Proinos Logos, a locally published newspaper

== Technology hub development ==
Beginning in the early 2020s, Ioannina has started to evolve into a significant technology hub. The city has attracted technology companies, which have helped to bolster Ioannina's technological capacity and contributed to a new economic trajectory for the city, driving development in this sector.

Additionally, the prefecture has been actively fostering partnerships between Greek and German companies in a bid to further strengthen the local economy and tech ecosystem. A Memorandum of Understanding (MoU) was signed with the Greek-German Chamber, outlining the recovery plan for the region, a move that has been seen as a significant step in boosting technological development in Ioannina.

== Consulates ==
The city hosts consulates from the following countries:

- Albania
- Belgium
- Netherlands

== Notable people from Ioannina ==
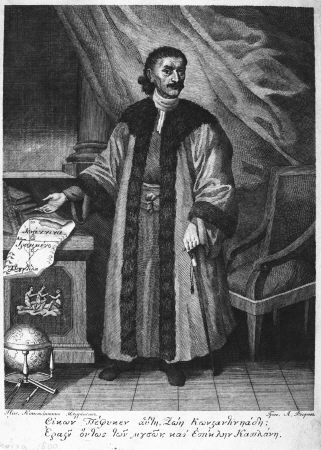
Zois Kaplanis

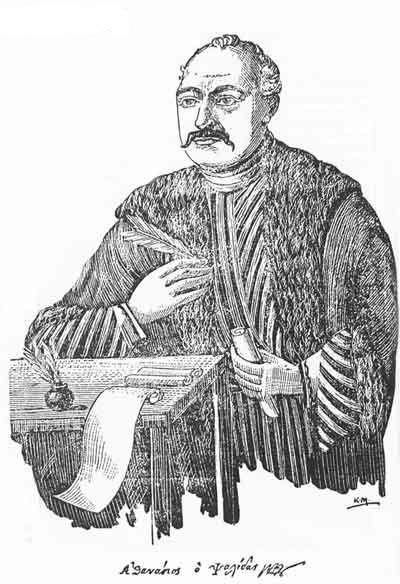
Athanasios Psalidas

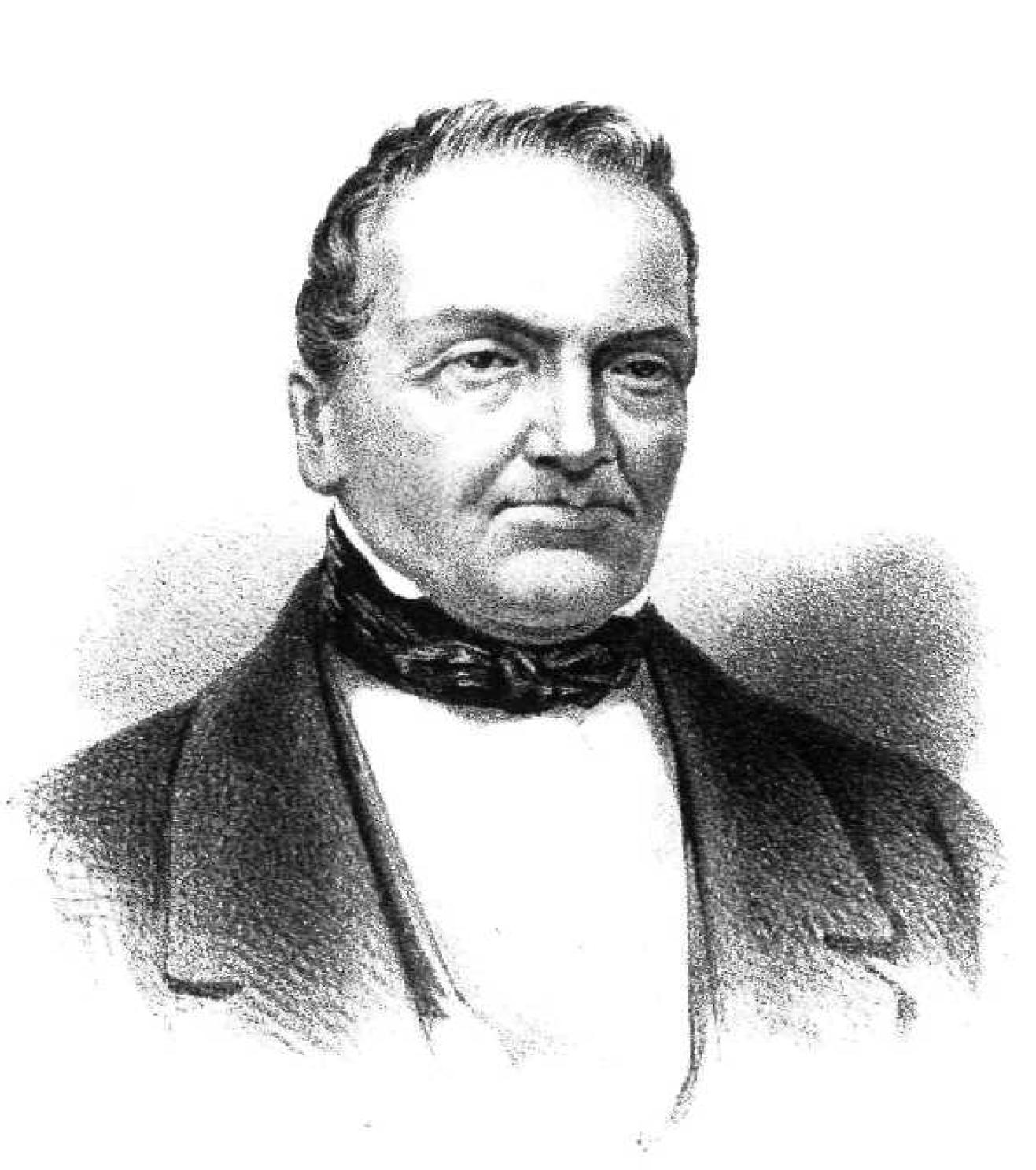
Georgios Stavros

- Michael Apsaras, 14th century, Greek noble
- Simon Strategopoulos 15th-century, noble and governor of Ioannina
- Epifanios Igoumenos (1568–1648), scholar
- Nikolaos Glykys (1619–1693), merchant and book publisher
- Nikolaos Sarros (1617–1697), book publisher, owner of one of the first Greek printing-houses in Venice
- Bessarion Makris (1635–1699), scholar
- Georgios Sougdouris (1645/7–1725), scholar
- Methodios Anthrakites (1660–1736), scholar
- Balanos Vasilopoulos (1694–1760), scholar
- Dimitrios Theodosiou (d. 1782), book publisher
- Zosimades brothers, benefactors, founders of the Zosimaia School
- Maroutsis family, traders and benefactors
- Kyra Frosini (1772–1800), socialite and heroine
- Lambros Photiadis (1752–1805), scholar
- Zois Kaplanis (1736—1806), merchant, founder of the Kaplaneios School
- Kosmas Balanos (1731–1808), scholar
- Grigorios Paliouritis (1778–1816), scholar
- Ioannis Vilaras (1771–1823), poet and scholar
- Athanasios Psalidas (1767–1829), scholar, of the main contributors of the Modern Greek Enlightenment
- Georgios Hadjikonstas (1753–1845), benefactor
- Vasileios Goudas (1779–1845), fighter of the Greek War of Independence
- Athanasios Tsakalov (1790–1851), one of the three founders of Filiki Eteria
- Michael Christaris (1773–1851), scholar
- Elisabeth Kastrisogia (1800–1863), benefactor
- Georgios Stavros (1787–1869), benefactor, founder of the National Bank of Greece
- Leonidas Palaskas (1819–1880), Hellenic navy officer
- Reshid Akif Pasha (1863—1920), Ottoman statesman
- Georgios Hatzis (Pelleren) (1881–1930), author and journalist
- Josef Elijia (1901–1931), Jewish Greek poet
- Patriarch Nicholas V of Alexandria (1876–1939)
- Wehib Pasha (1877–1940), Ottoman general
- Christos Adamidis (1885–1949), pioneer aviator and Hellenic Army General
- Mid'hat Frashëri (1880–1949), politician and writer
- Mehmet Esat Bülkat (1862–1952), Ottoman general
- İzzettin Çalışlar (1882–1951), officer of the Ottoman Army
- Abdülhalik Renda (1881—1957), Chairman of the Turkish National Assembly
- Markos Avgeris (1884–1973), poet
- Amalia Bakas (1897–1979), singer
- Dimitrios Hatzis (1913–1981), novelist
- Dimosthenis Kokkinos (1926–1991), Poet and author
- Fatma Hikmet İşmen (1918—2006), engineer
- Pavlos Vrellis (1922–2010), sculptor
- Dinos Constantinides (1929–2021), classical music composer
- Takis Mousafiris (1936–2021), Greek composer and songwriter
- Matsas family, Romaniote Jewish family; most known Minos Matsas
- Hierotheos (Vlachos), theologian
- Moses Elisaf (1954–2023), mayor from 2019 to 2023
- Costas Picadas, visual artist (born 1966)
- Vana Barba, actress
- Marios Oikonomou (1992–2026), international football player, played for PAS Giannina, AEK Athens and Italian clubs like Cagliari, Bologna, Bari, SPAL
- Georgios Dasios played for PAS Giannina and became the Director of the club
- Stefanos Ntouskos (b. 1997), gold medal in the Men's single sculls, at the 2020 Summer Olympics
- Amanda Tenfjord (b. 1997), singer and songwriter, Greek representative at Eurovision 2022
- Polychronis Tsigkas (b. 2000), Greek—Cypriot professional basketball player

== Sports ==
=== Sport clubs ===
Ioannina is home to a major sports team called PAS Giannina. It's an inspiration for many of old as well as new supporters of the whole region of Epirus, even outside Ioannina. Rowing is also very popular in Ioannina; the lake hosted several international events and serves as the venue for part of the annual Greek Rowing Championships.

Sport clubs based in Ioannina
Club	Founded	Sports	Achievements
NO Ioanninon	1954	Rowing	Long-time champions in Greece
Spartakos AO	1984	Olympic weightlifting, Judo, Track and field, Basketball	Long-time champions in Greece in weightlifting
PAS Giannina	1966	Football	Long-time presence in A Ethniki
AGS Giannena	1963	Basketball, Volleyball, Track and field	Earlier presence in A1 Ethniki volleyball
AE Giannena F.C.	2004	Football	Earlier presence in Gamma Ethniki
Giannena AS	2014	Volleyball	Presence in A2 Ethniki volleyball
Ioannina B.C.	2015	Basketball	Presence in B Ethniki
VIKOS FALCONS	2021	Basketball	Presence in B Ethniki

=== Sport complex ===
Sport complex based in Ioannina
Club	Founded	Sports	Clubs:
Zosimades Stadium	1952	Football	PAS Giannina
Panepirotan	2002	Basketball, Volleyball, Track and field	PAS Giannina, AO Velissarios FCAE Giannena

== Transport ==
- Ioannina is served by Ioannina National Airport.
- The A2 motorway (Egnatia Odos), part of the E90, passes by Ioannina. It links the west coast port of Igoumenitsa with the borders.
- Air Sea Lines flew from Lake Pamvotis to Corfu with seaplanes. Air Sea Lines has suspended flights from Corfu to Ioannina since 2007.
- Long-distance buses (KTEL) travel daily to Athens (6–6.5 hours) and Thessaloniki (3 hours).

== In popular culture ==
- "Yanina" figures prominently in Alexandre Dumas' novel The Count of Monte Cristo.
- Villagers of Ioannina City is a folk rock band from Ioannina, formed in 2007.

== International relations ==
=== Twin towns – sister cities ===
Ioannina is twinned with:

- Himara, Albania
- Požarevac, Serbia
- Limassol, Cyprus
- Ayia Napa, Cyprus
- Kiryat Ono, Israel
- Nizhyn, Ukraine
- Schwerte, Germany

== See also ==
- Epirus
- Maroutsaia School
- Uprising in Yanina
- Zagori, region and municipality near Ioannina
- List of mayors of Ioannina
- Timeline of Ioannina

== General sources ==
- Anastassiadou, Meropi (2002). "Yanya". In Bearman, P. J.; Bianquis, Th.; Bosworth, C. E.; van Donzel, E. & Heinrichs, W. P. (eds.). The Encyclopaedia of Islam, Second Edition. Volume XI: W–Z. Leiden: E. J. Brill. pp. 282–283. ISBN 978-90-04-12756-2.
- Dalven, Rae (1990), The Jews of Ioannina, Cadmus Press, ISBN 9780930685034.
- Fine, John V. A. (1994) [1987]. The Late Medieval Balkans: A Critical Survey from the Late Twelfth Century to the Ottoman Conquest. Ann Arbor, Michigan: University of Michigan Press. ISBN 978-0-472-10079-8.
- Gregory, T. E. (1991). "Ioannina". In Kazhdan, Alexander (ed.). The Oxford Dictionary of Byzantium. Oxford and New York: Oxford University Press. p. 1006. ISBN 0-19-504652-8.
- Nicol, Donald M. (1984). The Despotate of Epiros, 1267–1479: A Contribution to the History of Greece in the Middle Ages. Cambridge: Cambridge University Press. ISBN 978-0-521-13089-9.
- Papadopoulou, Varvara N., ed. (2014). Μουσεία στο Κάστρο Ιωαννίνων, Παράλληλες Διαδρομές (in Greek). Hellenic Ministry of Culture, 8th Ephorate of Byzantine Antiquities.
- Sakellariou, M. V. (1997). Epirus, 4000 years of Greek history and civilization. Athens: Ekdotike Athenon. ISBN 978-960-213-371-2.
- Soustal, Peter; Koder, Johannes (1981). Tabula Imperii Byzantini, Band 3: Nikopolis und Kephallēnia (in German). Vienna: Verlag der Österreichischen Akademie der Wissenschaften. ISBN 978-3-7001-0399-8.
