= List of mayors of Ioannina =

Mayor of Ioannina
- Δήμαρχος Ιωαννιτών
- Incumbent; Thomas Begas since 1 January 2024
- Website: https://ioannina.gr/

The mayor of Ioannina is the head of Ioannina.

== 19th century ==
=== Ottoman period (1870- ) ===
Name	Term start	Term end
Abountin Bey	1870	-
Yaya Bey Abdullah Pasha	1871	1890
Mehmet Emin Efendi	1893	1893
Chairi Patanta	1893	1895
Sestik Pasha	January 1896	1898
Chairi Patanta	1898	1900
Christakis Sakellarios	1900	-

== 20th century ==
=== Ottoman period ( -1913) ===
Name	Term start	Term end
Christakis Sakelarios	-	?
Celachoudin Teliatagas	-	1910
Yaya Bey Abdullah Pasha	1910	-

=== Kingdom of Greece (1913-1924) ===
Name	Term start	Term end
Yaya Bey Abdullah Pasha	1913	20 March 1916
Georgios Ioannidis	21 March 1916	2 November 1921
Vasileios Pirsinelas	3 November 1921	20 February 1923
Georgios Stavridis	21 February 1923	-

=== Second Hellenic Republic (1924–1935) ===
Name	Term start	Term end
Georgios Stavridis	-	22 December 1925
Vasileios Pirsinelas	23 December 1925	4 August 1929
Dimitrios Vlachlidis	5 August 1929	-

=== Kingdom of Greece (1935–1941) ===
Name	Term start	Term end
Dimitrios Vlachlidis	-	17 June 1941

=== Hellenic State (1941–1944) ===
Name	Term start	Term end
Axis occupation (1941–1944)
Commanders of occupation troops	18 June 1941	15 October 1944

=== Kingdom of Greece (1944–1974) ===
Name	Term start	Term end
Petros Apostolidis	25 December 1944	25 March 1945
Dimitrios Vlachlidis	26 March 1945	1 September 1950
Gerasimos Kourouklis	2 September 1950	19 May 1951
Theodoros Theodoridis	20 May 1951	31 December 1954
Grigorios Sakkas	1 January 1955	1964
Georgios Melanidis	7 August 1964	-
Christoforos Kostadimas	16 August 1964	24 June 1965
Spiros Katsadimas	1 July 1965	10 April 1967
Alekos Sofis	11 April 1967	21 April 1967
Greek Junta (1967–1974)
Nikolaos Ntasios	23 April 1967	September 1967
Spiros Filipou	October 1967	August 1973
Ioannis Kamperis	September 1973	October 1973
Panagiotis Tzoumas	October 1973	August 1974

=== Third Hellenic Republic (1974–present) ===
Name	Term start	Term end
Alexandros Pikoulas	16 October 1974	March 1975
Konstantinos Begas	May 1975	31 December 1978
Konstantinos Frontzos	19 January 1979	30 January 1980
Theodoros Georgiadis	31 January 1980	31 December 1982
Spiros Katsadimas	1 January 1983	12 September 1984
Charilaos Tolis	13 September 1984	31 December 1986
Filipos Filios	1 January 1987	31 December 1994
Eleftherios Glinavos	1 January 1995	31 December 1998
Anastasios Papastavrou	1 January 1999	-

== 21st century ==
=== Third Hellenic Republic (1974–present) ===
Name	Term start	Term end
Anastasios Papastavrou	-	31 December 2002
Nikolaos Gontas	1 January 2003	31 December 2010
Filipos Filios	1 January 2011	31 August 2014
Thomas Begas	1 September 2014	31 August 2019
Moses Elisaf	1 September 2019	17 February 2023
Dimitris Papageorgiou	28 February 2023	31 December 2023
Thomas Begas	1 January 2024	
