= Municipal Ethnographic Museum of Ioannina =

Coordinates: 39°40′24.8″N 20°51′36.9″E

The Municipal Ethnographic Museum of Ioannina
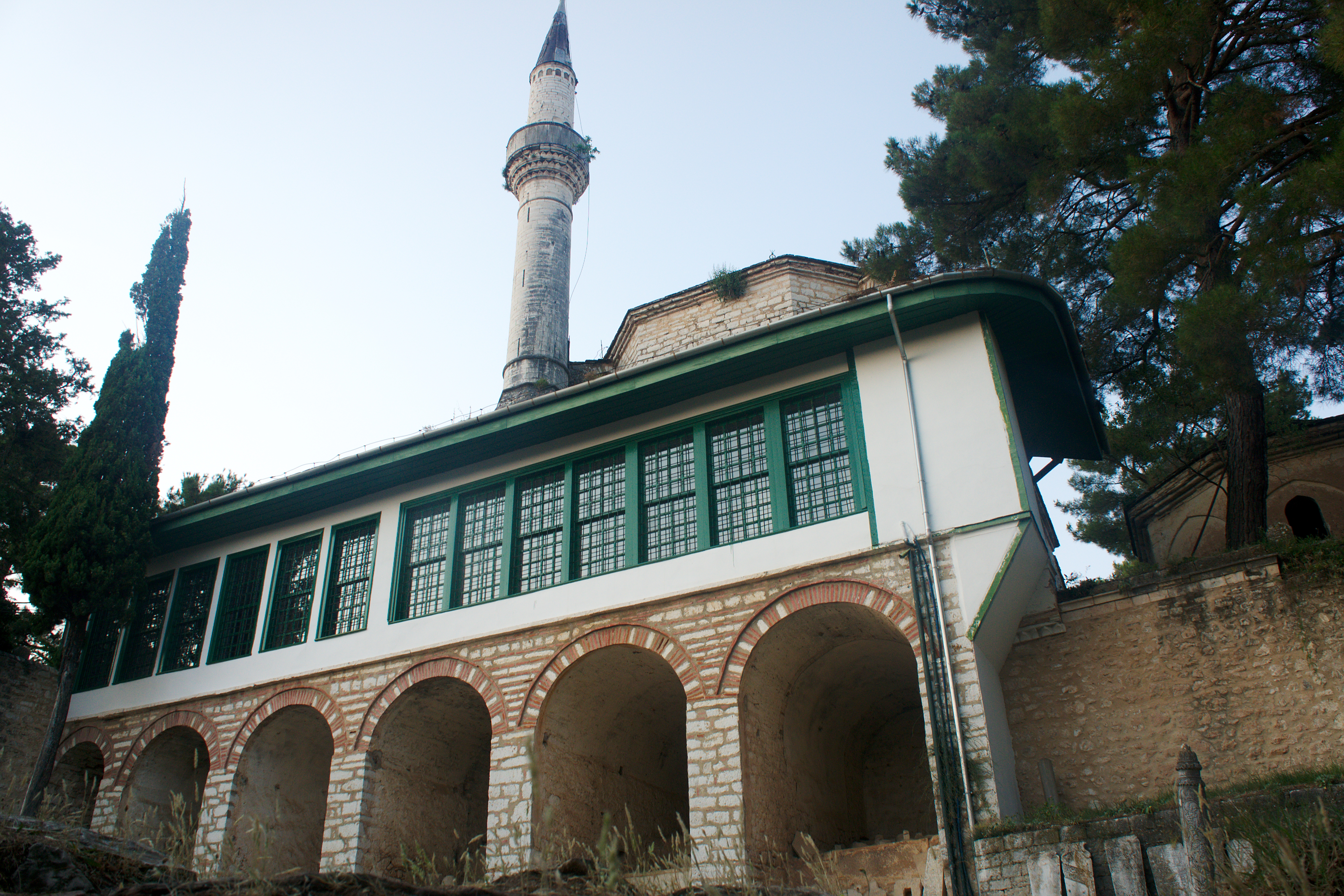
- Established: 1933
- Location: Old town of Ioannina, Greece
- Type: Ethnographic museum

The Municipal Ethnographic Museum of Ioannina is a museum in Ioannina, Greece.

It is housed in the Aslan Pasha Mosque, near Ali Pasha Mosque, in the Ioannina Castle since 1933. The Mosque was built in 1618 and in 1993 it was renovated to its present form.

Its permanent exhibition includes pottery, pictures, and other traditional decorative items, as well as jewelry, textiles, hand-weapons, wood-carved pieces of furniture and several personal objects that belonged to historical personalities.

There are also early photographs and paintings related to the liberation of the city of Ioannina. Additionally the museum hosts exhibitions on historical topics as well as collections of art.
