= Zosimades =

Greek merchant family

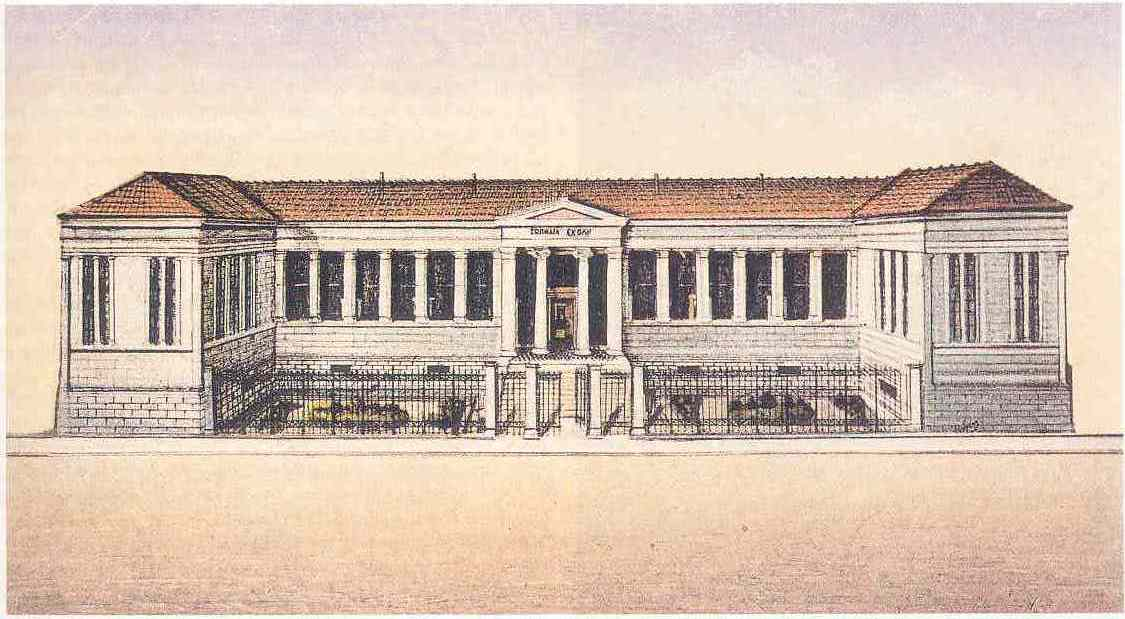
19th century picture of Zosimaia school.

The Zosimades (Greek: Ζωσιμάδες) or Zosimas brothers were 18th–19th century Greek benefactors and merchants.

The Zosimades were six brothers:

- Ioannis Zosimas (1752–1771)
- Anastasios Zosimas (1754–1828)
- Nikolaos Zosimas (1758–1842)
- Theodosios Zosimas (1760–1793)
- Zois Zosimas (1764–1828)
- Michael Zosimas (1766–1809)

They were born in Ioannina, a city that was under Ottoman rule and a major center of the Greek Enlightenment that time. Their father was a local merchant, Panagis Zosimas. In 1775, Nikolaos, Theodosios and Michael started their trading activities in Livorno, Italy, while Ioannis, Anastasios and Zois ran their trade business in Nizhyn (Ukraine) and then in Moscow. Their trade network soon became profitable and they managed to make a fortune.

== Benefaction ==
After Theodosis' death (1793), he wrote in his testament that they should financially support the education of their home city Ioannina. So they donated astronomical amounts of money for the establishment and function of various schools and public libraries. Another huge donation went for the National Library, of Adamantios Korais, one of the major contributors of the Greek Enlightenment movement. Apart from educational institutions, orphanages were also financed. The Zosimades also subsidized the publication of several books.

At 1820, after Zois' death, they supported the establishment of a new school in their home place, which became known as Zosimaia. This institution would become the center of Greek education the following century in the region of Epirus.

During the following outbreak of the Greek War of Independence (1821–1830) the remaining Zosimades became active members of the patriotic organization Philiki Etaireia and supported financially the struggle. Zosimades also completely financed the erection of the Monetary Museum of Athens, donating their personal collection of Ancient Greek and Roman currency, as well as the orphanage in Patmos.

== See also ==
- Manthos and Georgios Rizaris
- Georgios and Simon Sinas
- Evangelis and Konstantinos Zappas

== Sources ==
- Fleming Katherine Elizabeth. The Muslim Bonaparte: diplomacy and orientalism in Ali Pasha's Greece. Princeton University Press, 1999. ISBN 978-0-691-00194-4.
- Modern Greek studies yearbook. University of Minnesota, 1989.
- Sir John Edwin Sandys. A History of Classical Scholarship: The eighteenth century in Germany, and the nineteenth century in Europe and the United States of America. Hafner Pub. Co., 1967.
- Prousis Theophilus Christopher. Russian cultural response to the Greek War of Independence (1821-1830). University of Minnesota, 1982.
