= Ipirotikos Agon =

- Publisher: Ms Lukia Tzallas
- Headquarters: Ioannina, Epirus
- Website: http://www.agon.gr/

Ipirotikos Agon ("Epirot Struggle") (Greek: Ηπειρωτικός Αγών) is one of the oldest newspapers published in Greece. Its headquarters are in Ioannina, Epirus.

== History ==
It was set in 1923 in the region of Epirus and was first published with the title "Thunder". The next year it was retitled to Ipirotiki Icho ("Epirote Echo") until 1927, when it took its current title.

During the past seventy-eight years the news-paper has been circulating daily without failure. The only exception was during the Second World War, when the local news-papers were forced for two years to publish a common "News Bulletin".

A second exception occurred during the period of 1973 to 1974 when the dictatorial Regime of the Colonels stopped the paper's circulation for some time, due to anti-dictatorship editions. During the newspaper's history there have been two publishers who have been connected more than anybody else with the publishing of the newspaper. Efthimios Tzallas was publisher until 1968, and after him his son Eleftherios became publisher and head of the news-paper until 1983.

In 2000 Ipirotikos Agon celebrated its twenty-thousandth newspaper publication, making a special edition for old colleagues, employees, subscribers and readers, to "testify" their own experience through the history of the newspaper.

Ipirotikos Agon was nominated for two more distinctions in the recent years. On 22 March 2004, the Athanasios Vas. Botsis Institute for the Promotion of Journalism awarded a prize to Ipirotikos Agon for its overall contribution to the media throughout its 77-year history, the quality of the newspaper and the coverage of regional issues.

On 22 November 2007, Ipirotikos Agon and its columnists Alekos Raptis and Thimios Tzallas received the State Award for Best Article in a regional newspaper for the year 2006. The article was titled: "5 dramatic pictures re-emerge" and referred to the deportation of Ioannina's Jewish Community by the Nazis in 1944.
