= Byzantine Museum of Ioannina =

Coordinates: 39°40′0″N 20°51′22″E

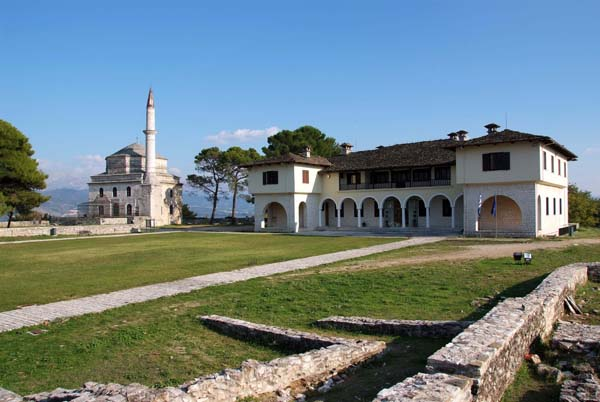
- The Byzantine Museum as seen from Ali Pasha's palace ruins
- Established: 1995
- Location: Ioannina, Greece
- Type: Byzantine Museum

The Byzantine Museum of Ioannina is housed in one of the buildings of citadel (Its Kale) of Ioannina, the capital of the Epirus region in northwestern Greece. The central section was built in the 1960s and originally functioned as a Royal Pavilion.

== History ==
The museum was opened to the public in 1995. The collection of the silver items is housed in a separate 19th-century building on the citadel, and plans are ongoing to spread the exhibition among several other buildings in the citadel. The museum contains collections of Early Christian and Byzantine sculptures, excavation finds from Arta, pottery, manuscripts and early editions of printed books, post-Byzantine icons and silver items.

== Main Exhibits ==
- Marble fragment of an iconostasis (altar screen), from Glyke. It is decorated with relief representations of birds on the front side and floral patterns and interlaced circles on the lower surface. Dated to the end of the 12th or the beginning of the 13th century.
- Glazed clay icons from the east pediment of the church of St. Basil in Arta. A pair of icons with the representations of the Crucifixion and the Three Hierarchs date to the 14th century.
- Left chancel door from the church of Saint Nicholas at Perama. Representations of an angel, the Annunciation, and Apostle Peter are carved in wood. Dated to the 15th century.
- Printed book, the first edition of the comments of Simplicius on Aristotle. It was printed in 1499, by Zacharias Callierghis in Venice in the printing establishment of N. Vlastos.
- Manuscript Gospel from the Molyvdoskepastos Monastery. The silver-cut decoration represents the Crucifixion on the one side and Dormition on the other. Dated to 1575.
- Icon painted by the Cretan artist Theodoros Poulakis. In the middle, Saint John the Baptist is depicted in full length, and scenes from his life are painted in the frame. Dated to the second half of the 17th century.
- Icon depicting St. Catherine's engagement. In the lower part, the donors are depicted in the gesture of deesis (prayer) while in the frame a Greek inscription is discernible, mentioning the date 1688. This icon is undoubtedly the product of a Western workshop.
- Silver benedictory cross with wooden carved nucleus. It is covered with silver and has attached wire palmettes. At the base, it is surrounded by two symmetrical spiral antennae covered with ivory. It bears the inscription: possession OF DEMETRIOS, THE PRIEST 1800.
- Wall painting from a wealthy home (archontikon) in Ioannina. Painted by Alexandros Demiris in the 19th century, it is a reproduction of Giulio Romano's 16th century Battle of the Milvian Bridge.
