= Vasileiou =

Vasileiou or Vas[s]iliou (Greek: Βασιλείου) is a Greek surname. Notable people with the surname include:

- Alexandros Vasileiou (1760–1818), Greek merchant and scholar
- Alexia Vassiliou (born 1964), Cypriot singer and musician
- Androulla Vassiliou (born 1943), Cypriot politician
- Eleni Vasileiou (born 1974), Greek basketball player
- George Vasiliou (1931–2026), Cypriot politician, President of Cyprus (1988–1993)
- Giorgos Vasiliou (1950–2016), Greek actor
- Giorgos Vasiliou (footballer) (born 1984), Cypriot footballer
- Mari Vasileiou (born 1990), Cypriot beauty pageant winner
- Maria Vassiliou (1950–1989), Cypriot actress
- Marius Vassiliou (born 1957), American geophysicist
- Markos Vassiliou (born 1983), Greek musician
- Michael Vasileiou, Greek merchant
- Nikos Vasiliou (born 1977), Greek footballer
- Panagiotis Vasiliou (born 1961), Greek squash champion
- Spyros Vassiliou (1902–1985), Greek painter
- Stylianos Vasileiou (born 1991), Greek footballer
