= Anthimos Gazis =

Greek philosopher (1758–1828)

The Reverend Anthimos Gazis
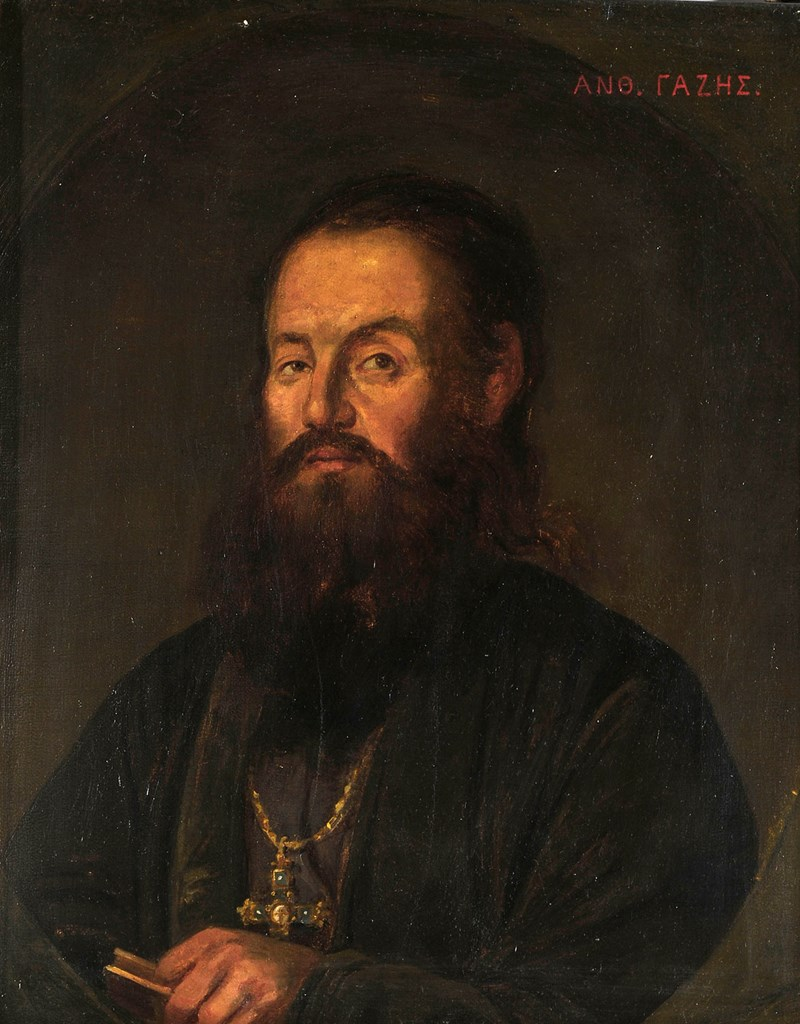
- Anthimos Gazis
- Born: 1758; Milies, Ottoman Empire (now Greece)
- Died: 24 June 1828 (aged 69–70); Ermoupoli, Greece
- Other names: Anastasios Gazalis; Anastasios Gazis
- Occupations: Eastern Orthodox archimandrite, cartographer, publisher, translator, philologist, revolutionary, politician
- Known for: Hermes o Logios; Filomousos Eteria
- Notable work: Greek Dictionary; Hellenic Library (1807)

Anthimos Gazis or Gazes (Greek: Ἄνθιμος Γαζῆς; born Anastasios Gazalis, Ἀναστάσιος Γκάζαλης; 1758 – 24 June 1828) was a Greek scholar, revolutionary and politician. He was born in Milies (Thessaly) in Ottoman Greece in 1758 into a family of modest means. In 1774 he became an Eastern Orthodox deacon; his career later brought him to Constantinople where he was promoted to archimandrite. He left for Vienna in 1789, where he preached at the Church of Saint George, while simultaneously pursuing his academic interests. His efforts to promote education in Greece through the Filomousos Eteria, translation work and contributions to the first Greek philological periodical, Hermes o Logios, played a significant role in the development of the Greek Enlightenment.

In 1817, he joined the Filiki Eteria secret society and returned to his homeland, recruiting others in preparation for an anti–Ottoman revolt. In 1821, with the start of the Greek War of Independence against the Ottoman Empire he led the Greek insurgents in Magnesia. After the suppression of the revolt there, he went to Central Greece. He represented Magnesia in National Assemblies of Epidaurus and Astros and worked in commissions regarding military affairs and education. In 1827, he fell ill and his condition steadily deteriorated until his death on 24 June 1828 in Ermoupoli, Syros. Gazis died in poverty, having donated most of his savings to the Greek army.

== Early life ==
Anastasios Gazalis was born in Milies in 1758. His father Panagiotis Gazalis and his mother Maria Argyriou Philippidi had four sons and four daughters. His family was poor, with the situation worsening when his father died in 1761. In 1770 he joined his village's school where he was taught by the monk Anthimos Papapantazis. He continued his education in the Old School of Rigas in Zagora, where he studied logic, astronomy, philosophy, Greek philology, geography, natural sciences and mathematics. Zagora was well developed economically owing to its booming silk industry; unlike other areas of Greece its citizens had the right to bear arms and enjoyed a degree of relative autonomy. It was during this time that he hellenized his name into Anastasios Gazis. In 1774, he became a deacon upon his uncle's request; ecclesiastical professions were popular at the time. Accordingly, he assumed the clerical name Anthimos. The treaties of Küçük Kaynarca, Jassy and Constantinople guaranteed the freedom of religion for Ottoman subjects, while also safeguarding church property and granting the right to erect new churches. A year later he was promoted to presbyter and sent to the village of Vizitsa, where he worked as a teacher. At the conclusion of his one year contract he departed for Constantinople, where he served as a secretary for the Ecumenical Patriarch of Constantinople Sofronios II. Sofronios remarked upon Gazis' dedication and hard work rewarding him with the rank of archimandrite. Gazis soon befriended a merchant named Aggelis Mammaras of Makrinitsa who urged him to leave for Vienna after covering his expenses. Gazis left for Vienna in 1789.

The peace treaties of Passarowitz and Belgrade had restored commercial activity between the Habsburg monarchy and the Ottoman Empire. Vienna became an important center of the Greek diaspora, where both goods and ideas were exchanged freely. The religious life of the Greek community revolved around the Church of Saint George and the Holy Trinity Church. In May 1796, a twelve man commission voted Gazis as the new rector of the former. During this time frame he devoted time to the study of physics and mathematics while also translating Benjamin Martin’s “Philosophical Grammar” from French which he published in 1799. Gazis supplemented the translation with extensive notes of his own on the subjects of electricity, magnetism, chemical reactions and the propagation of light. In 1800, Gazis reissued an edited version of Rigas Feraios' Charta of Greece; dimensions were cut in half and Jean-Denis Barbié du Bocage's topographical plans were removed. The second edition was dedicated to the Greek nation and showed an allegorical figure representing the Greek civilization as being armed, with the motto "I shall follow your lead" appearing beneath her. In 1802, he published Fourcroy's The Philosophy of Chemistry; the text also contains additions from Fourcroy's A General System of Chemical Knowledge, Scherzer's Journal der Chemie (Leipzig, 1792), Französische Annalen der Allgemeinen Naturgeschichte (Hamburg, 1802) and Gren's Grundriss der Chemie. In the same year his health deteriorated significantly due to an illness. He left Vienna, returning only in November 1804 to resume preaching. His stay would be brief as he soon left for Venice where he published Greek Lexicon and Greek Library, works based on Gesner's Bibliotheca universalis and Fabricius' Bibliotheca Graeca. He resumed his duties as rector in early 1808.

In 1811, he received an honorary diploma from the “Graeco–Dacian Philological Institute of Bucharest” for his contribution to the advancement of science. In the same year he founded the first philological periodical in Greek, Hermes o Logios ("Hermes the Scholar"), published in Vienna. It is regarded as the most significant and longest running periodical of the period prior to the outbreak of the Greek War of Independence, containing contributions by key scholars and intellectuals. Hermes o Logios aimed at creating intellectual contacts between the Greek communities of the Ottoman Empire and the Greek Diaspora in Western Europe, as well as the preparing national awakening of the Greek people.

== Revolutionary activity ==
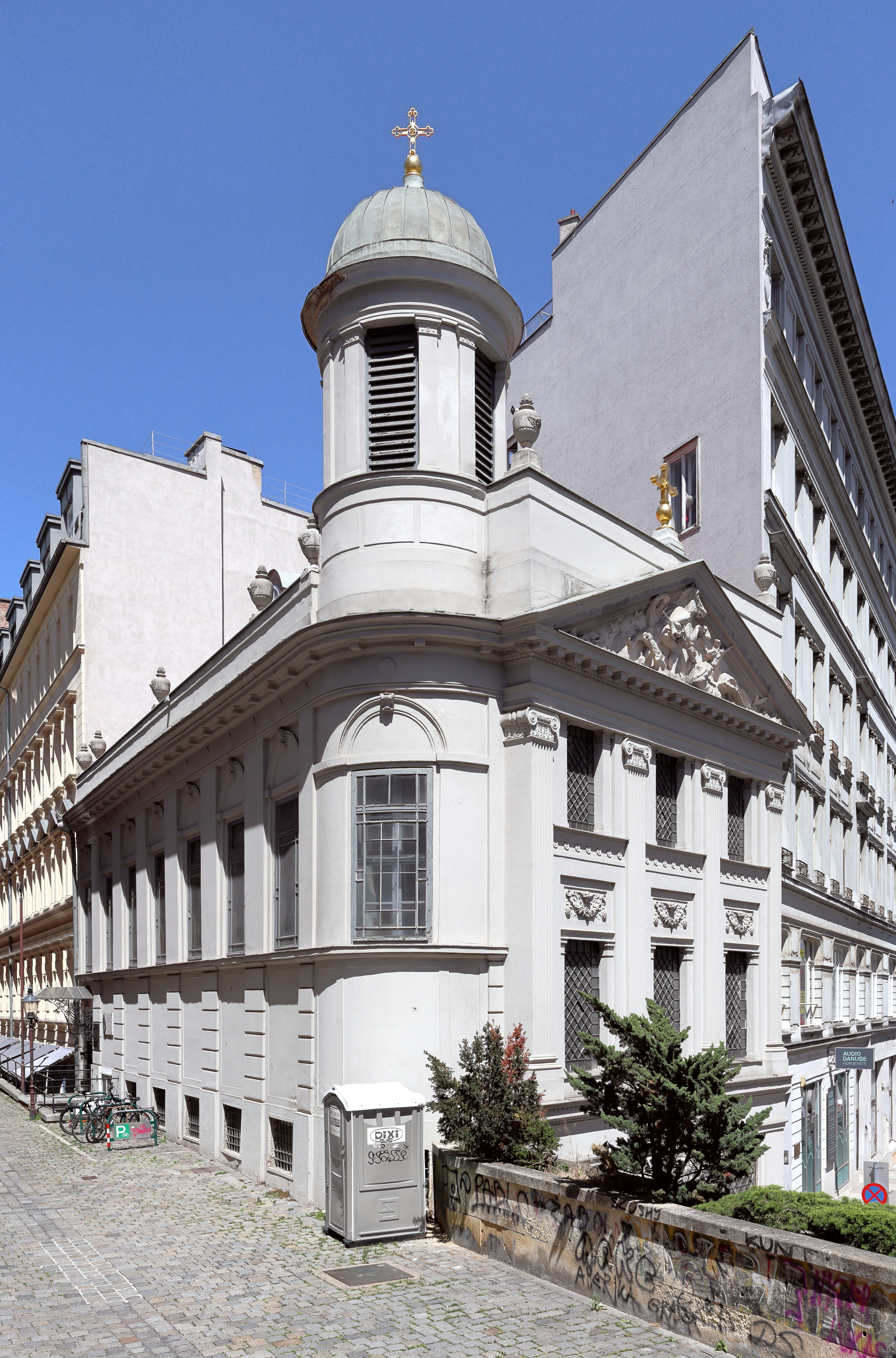
Saint George Church in Wien, where Gazis preached.

On 1 September 1813, the Filomousos Eteria was founded in Athens, with Gazis among its four curators. Its goals were the propagation of education in Greece, providing funds for poor students, publishing works of classical literature and the preservation of antiquities. The organization influenced the spread of the ideas of the Modern Greek Enlightenment, indirectly promoting nationalism. On 1 January 1815, Gazis opened a second chapter of the Filomousos Eteria in Vienna. He developed a lively correspondence with German classicist Friedrich Thiersch, who in turn assisted Greek students in enrolling into Bavarian universities. Funds funneled from British and Russian donors covered the student's expenses. The Austrian intelligence service took note of Gazis' activities in the Filomousos Eteria as well as his close relationship with the Russian community in Vienna, ordering his surveillance. Gazis quit as rector in 1815. His reasoning was that he answered the call of patriotic speeches (made by Adamantios Korais and Ioannis Kapodistrias) and would return to his homeland. In the spring of 1817, he traveled east through the Danubian Principalities to Odessa where he met the leadership and after some hesitation joined Filiki Eteria, a secret organization tasked with overthrowing Ottoman rule of Greece and replacing it with an independent Greek state. Passing through Constantinople, he returned to Milies to teach in the local school. In March 1818, he was visited by Athanasios Tsakalov who proposed relocating the leadership of Filiki Eteria to Pelion, Gazis disagreed, claiming that the Mani Peninsula would be a better choice and thus the plan did not materialize. Gazis traveled through Magnesia under the pretense of conducting an archeological survey, while in reality actively recruiting for the Filiki Eteria. His most notable success was the initiation of Pilion armatolos Kyriakos Bastekis and Makrinitsa head kodjabashi Hatzi Rigas. Although already a member of Filiki Eteria, scholar Grigorios Konstantas reluctantly agreed to support the use of force.

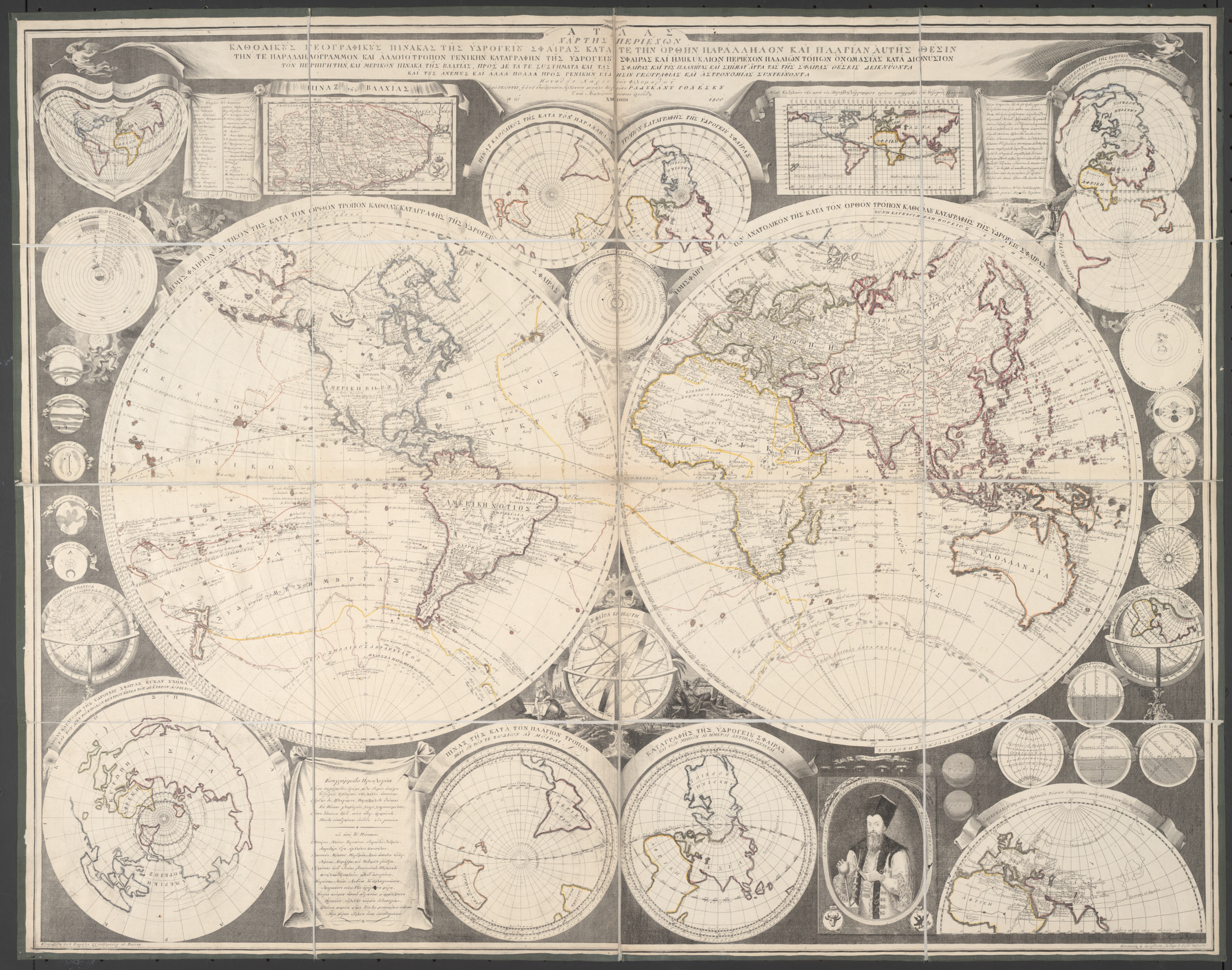
"Atlas of the Globe" by Gazis, Vienna, 1800

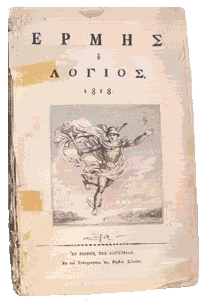
1818 issue of "Hermes o Logios".

On 7 May 1821, revolutionaries gathered at the entrance of the Agioi Taxiarches Church in Milies, with Gazis heading the meeting. A white flag bearing five red crosses and topped with a sun was unveiled, while Gazis read a letter written by Alexander Ypsilantis. On the same day, Gazis led a group of rebels into the village of Lechonia populated mainly by Turks, 200 of them were slain while the womenfolk were taken to the monasteries of Agios Georgios and Agios Lavrentios. They then proceeded to Efta Platania besieging its castle. Attempts to storm the castle failed as the rebels only possessed a single rusty cannon, while human wave attacks proved sanguine. On 11 May, the siege was abandoned and the rebels raided Velestino, slaughtering those who had not already left it, burning and looting their houses and crops. A second meeting (styled Boule of Thessalo–Magnesia) took place in Velestino where Gazis officially declared the beginning of the insurrection to the representatives of the 24 villages surrounding Pilion, calling for the Christians of Thessaly to rise against the Ottomans. On 15 May, Mahmud Dramali Pasha's army descended from Larissa, burning Kapurna and Kanalia. Rebels from Zagora, Makrinitsa and Volos fled in panic, many of them sought refuge in Trikeri. Dramali's arrival prompted most kodjabashis to bend the knee to the Turks. In the meantime Dramali marched on Milies with the intent to burn it, the rebels decided to defend their headquarters. The situation in the village became tense when local kodjabashi Stavrakis Morfoulis, attempted to shoot Gazis after exclaiming "Damn you, you doomed us all!". One of Gazis' comrades knocked the gun out of his hand before he was able to take a shot. Other kodjabashis tried to discredit the revolutionaries promising to act as emissaries to the Turks, in hopes that they will show mercy. Gazis and most other rebels left the village and by June the kodjabashis surrendered it to the Turks, being granted amnesty in return. Although a small scale insurgency continued, the revolution in Thessaly had ultimately collapsed.

A boat took Gazis to Skiathos. The island housed significant numbers of refugees from Thessaly, who had resorted to selling their clothes and jewelry for minuscule portions of food. Skiathos kodjabashis saw Gazis as a troublemaker, spreading rumors that he had embezzled funds sent to him from abroad. One day a mob of refugees nearly lynched Gazis who was saved after the intervention by a local man named Anagnostis Benakis. Gazis' comrades then took him to the Skiathos Castle and then Skopelos. When the man housing Gazis accidentally killed a man while practicing with his pistol, a mob set fire to his house. Gazis was seriously injured in the incident, spending two days in bed. Following his recovery he departed for Talantonisi and from there to Morea, eventually settling in Salona. On 15 November, Gazis participated in the Areopagus of Eastern Continental Greece, a meeting of clerics, kodjabashis, armatoloi and other officials from Thessaly, Epirus, Macedonia and Central Greece. There Gazis was elected as an official representative of the First National Assembly at Epidaurus. For the next thirteen months Gazis provided logistical support to insurgents on Euboea and obstructed Turkish efforts to send supplies to their garrisons in Morea. On 29 March 1823, he joined the Second National Assembly at Astros. On 17 May 1824, he became a member of a commission regarding military affairs while simultaneously working in commissions of education. During that time Gazis and Konstantas presented a draft proposing the creation of an academy in Argos named Protypon Didaktirion. The plan did not come to fruition due to events such as the Destruction of Psara and the ongoing Greek civil wars of 1824–1825.

== Death ==
In 1827, Gazis fell ill while residing in Tinos, he later relocated to his private residence in Syros. His health continued to deteriorate and he lived in poverty. The Greek government provided him with 650 grosia while owing him 2,350 more. In letter to Georgios Kountouriotis, he complained about the fortunes that corrupted officials had amassed in the confusion of the revolution, while his personal contribution to the sustenance of Greek army had been all but forgotten. On 3 April 1828, he composed his testament in Aegina. The school he had founded together with Konstantas in Milies and his personal library were given to the Greek state. His house in Syros, the property he inherited from his father and a sum of 2,500 grosia were split between his nieces and nephews. On 10 December, Gazis died in his house in Ermoupoli, he was buried outside the Ieros Naos Metamorfoseos Church in Ermoupoli.
