= Pierre Peytier =

French geographer and painter (1793–1864)

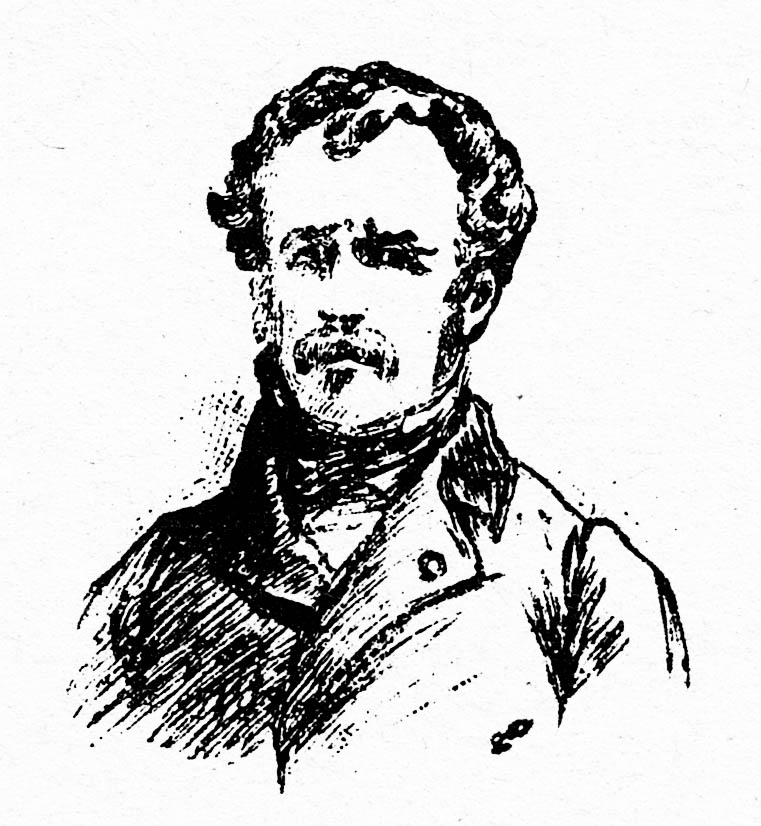
- Born: 15 October 1793; Genestelle, Ardèche, France
- Died: 1864 (aged 70–71)
- Occupations: Geographer; engineer cartographer; painter; military officer
- Known for: Establishment of the first scientific maps of Greece (1832 and 1852) during the Scientific Expedition of Morea (1829)
- Title: Colonel (1852)

Pierre Peytier - Jean Pierre Eugène Félicien Peytier (15 October 1793 – 1864), sometimes named Eugène Peytier - was a French officer, geographer, engineer, cartographer and painter.

== Life ==
Pierre Peytier entered the École polytechnique in 1811, where he obtained his diploma (X1811). He was then integrated into the topographical service of the French army in the corps of the engineers-geographers in 1813. He was promoted lieutenant in 1817, then capitain in 1827.

=== In the Pyrenees (1825) ===
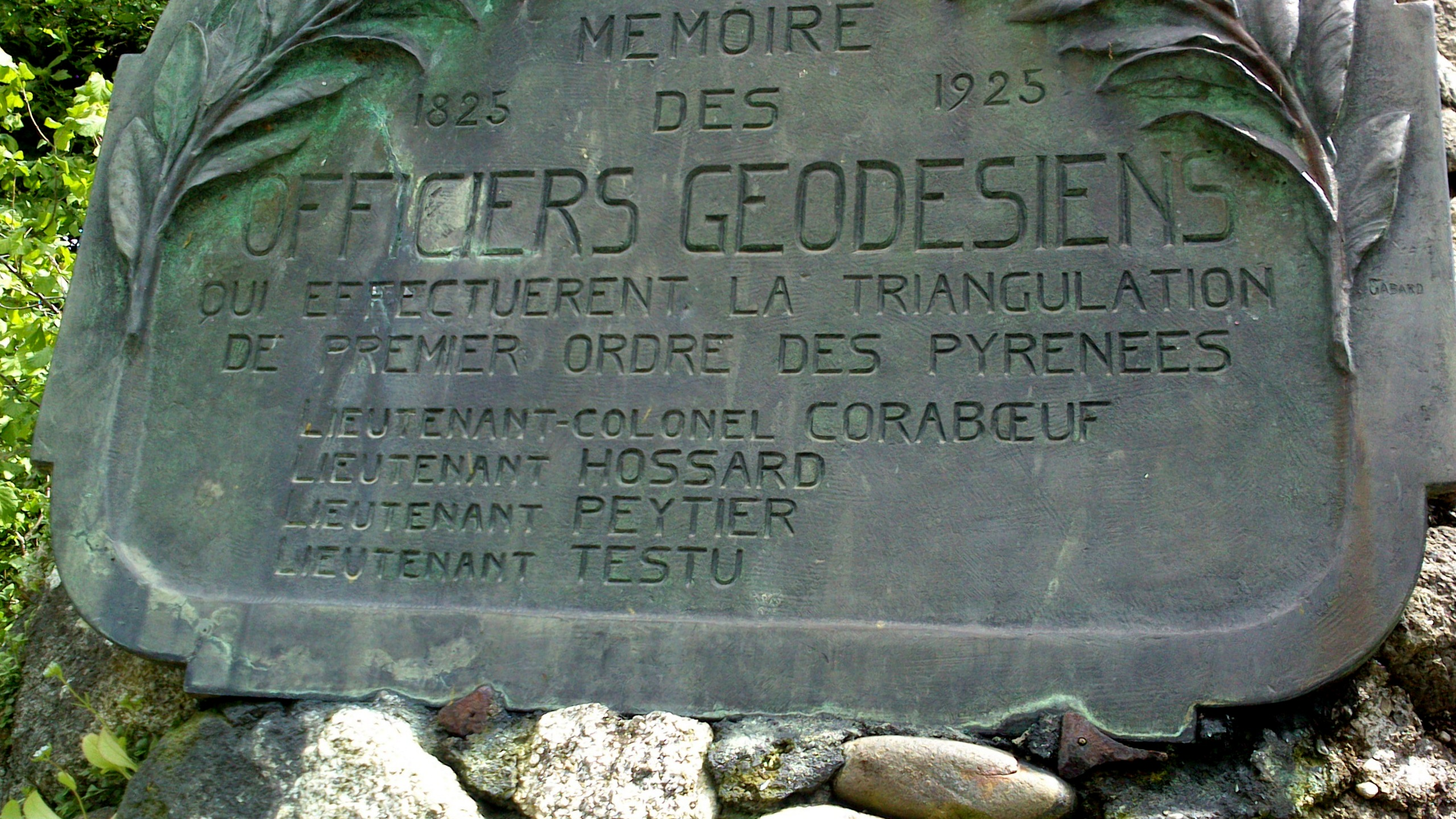
Commemorative plaque - Monument to the glory of the Geodesists on the road to the col du Soulor in the Pyrenees.

Engineer geographer and geodesist, he was one of the first geodesic officers charged in 1825 with the triangulation of the Pyrenees in order to establish the map of France, together with his colleague Paul-Michel Hossard. By necessity of service and together with the officers Corabœuf and Testuhe, he was also one of the first pyreneists.

He made the first ascents of the Pyrenean peaks Palas, Balaïtous and Saint-Barthélemy. These true exploits went completely unnoticed at the time and many later ascensionists, believing they were achieving these ascents first, found traces of the passage of the Geodesists. That was the case for the explorer Charles Packe when reaching the summit of the Balaïtous.

=== Scientific expedition of Morea (1829) ===
Captain Pierre Peytier, of the topographic service of the French army, had already been invited to Greece by its Governor Ioannis Kapodistrias when the latter had come to Paris in October 1827 to ask the French government for advisers and officers of the army French to organize the army of the newly founded Greek State (during the Greek War of Independence). Thus, on the recommendation of the French Ministry of War, Peytier and three other officers arrived in Greece, in order to train young Greek engineers who would undertake surveying projects, while Peytier himself was to draw the plans for the city of Corinth and the map of Peloponnese. Then when the scientific expedition of Morea landed at Navarino in the Peloponnese on 3 March 1829, Peytier was thus attached to it.

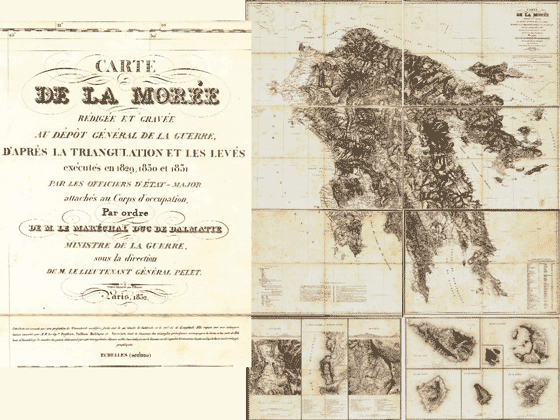
Map of Morea of 1832 (by captain Pierre Peytier), the first map of the Greek territory ever constructed scientifically and geodesically.

As soon as from March, a base of 3,500 meters had been traced in the Argolis, from one angle at the ruins of Tiryns to an angle of a house in ruins in the village of Aria. This was intended to serve as a point of departure in all the triangulation operations for topographic and geodesic readings in the Peloponnese. Peytier and Puillon-Boblaye proceeded to perform numerous verifications on the base and on the rulers used. The margin of error was thus reduced to 1 meter for every 15 kilometers. The longitude and latitude of the base point at Tiryns were read and checked, so that again the margin of error was reduced as far as possible to an estimated 0.2 seconds. 134 geodesic stations were set up on the peninsula's mountains, as well as on Aegina, Hydra and Nafplion. Thus, equilateral triangles whose sides measured about 20 km (12 mi) were drawn. The angles were measured with Gambey's theodolites. However, after the departure of the scientific mission from Greece, and although he fell ill with the fever five times, Peytier remained there alone until 31 July 1831 to complete the trigonometric, topographic and statistical work for the establishment of the map of Morea.

This « Map of 1832 », very precise, drawn at a 1/200,000 scale, over 6 sheets (plus two sheets depicting some of the islands of the Cyclades) was the first map of the Greek territory ever constructed scientifically and geodesically.

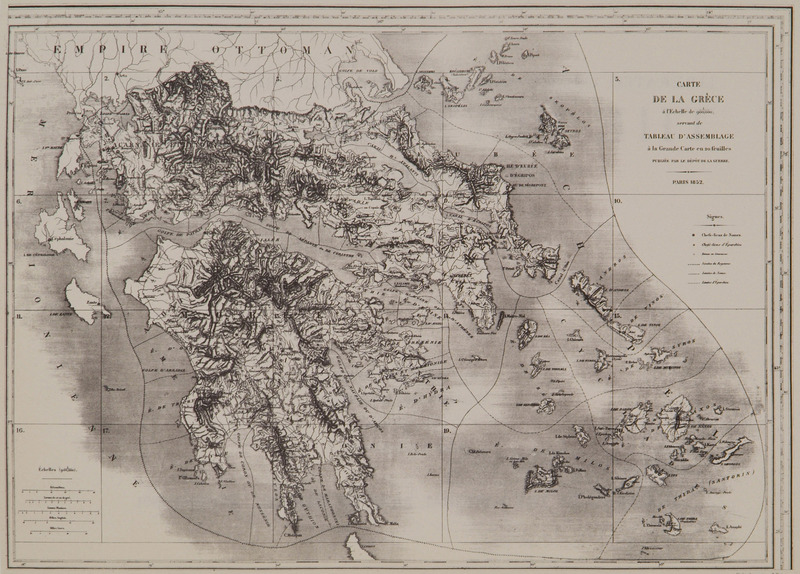
Map of the Kingdom of Greece of 1852 (by captain Pierre Peytier)

After a passage in France between 1831 and 1833, Peytier returned to Greece on 28 March 1833 and remained there until March 1836 to direct most of the work for the preparation of the complete map of the Kingdom of Greece at that time. This « Map of 1852 » was definitively published under his direction in 1852.

Peytier also left an album which he himself composed with his pencil drawings, sepias and watercolours depicting city views, monuments, costumes and inhabitants of Greece at the time. He used an artistic style that avoided idealization for the benefit of scientific fidelity and precision, which fully revealed the topographer that he was.

== The last years ==
Peytier returned definitively to France in 1836 and from 1839 he continued his work on the map of France in the cartographic section of the army. He became director of the war archives. He was promoted to the rank of colonel in 1852. He died in 1864 at the age of seventy.

== Gallery of drawings ==
Drawings of Pierre Peytier taken from The Peytier Album, Liberated Greece and the Morea Scientific Expedition, in the Stephen Vagliano Collection, Published by the National Bank of Greece, Athens, 1971.

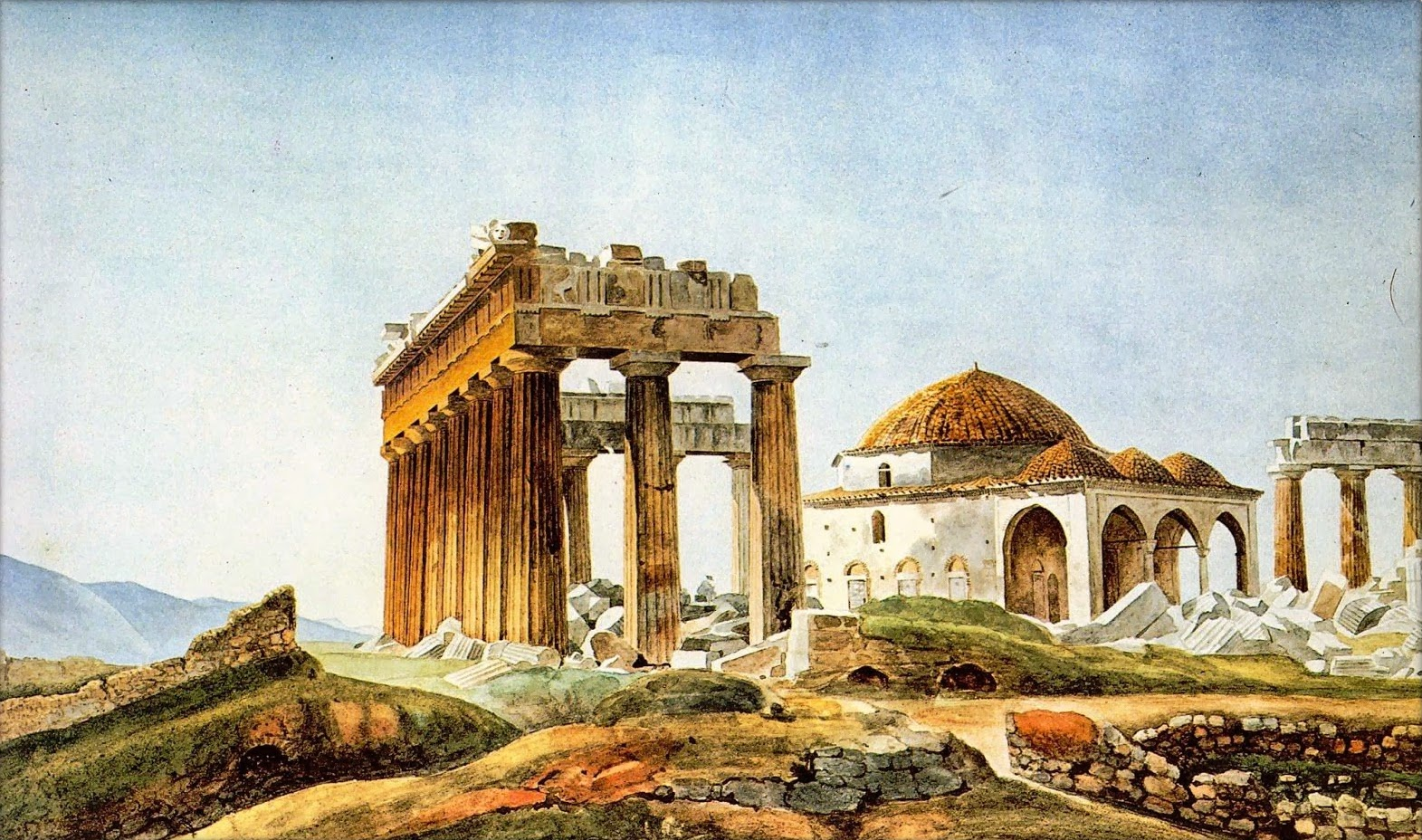
The mosque of the Parthenon from the northeast.

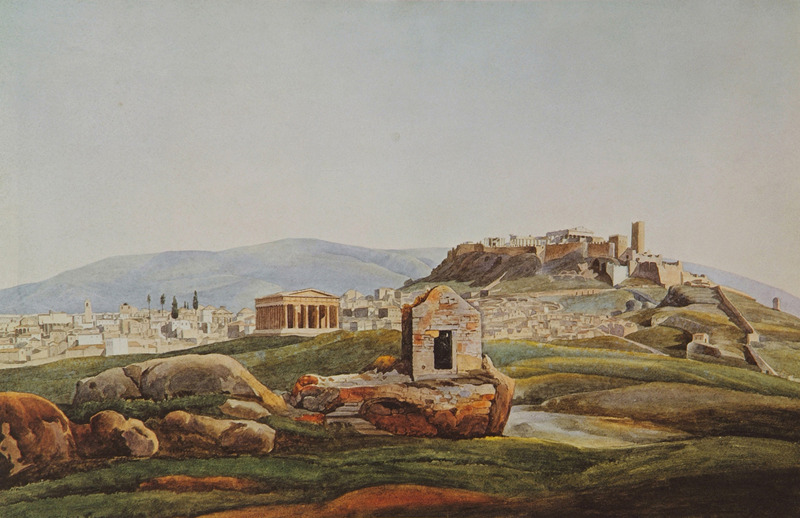
View of Athens from the northwest.

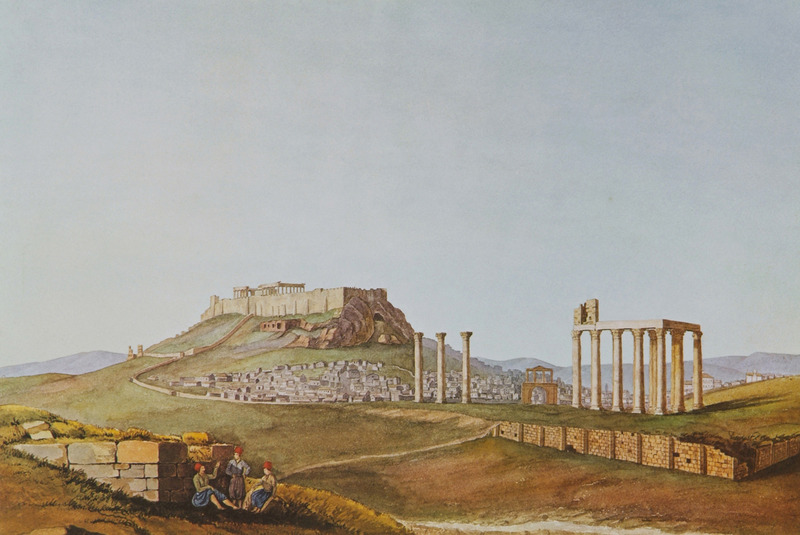
View of Athens from the southeast (before 1834).

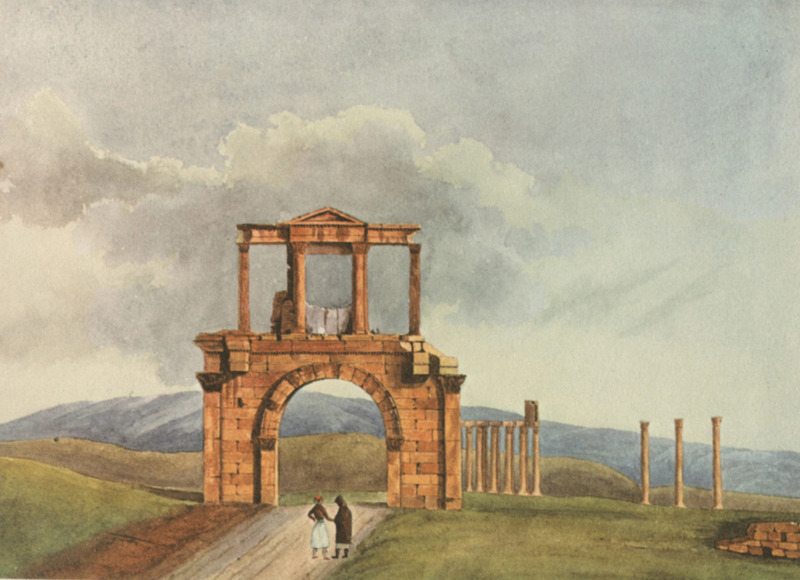
Hadrian's Arch and the Temple of Olympian Zeus, from the west (after 1834).

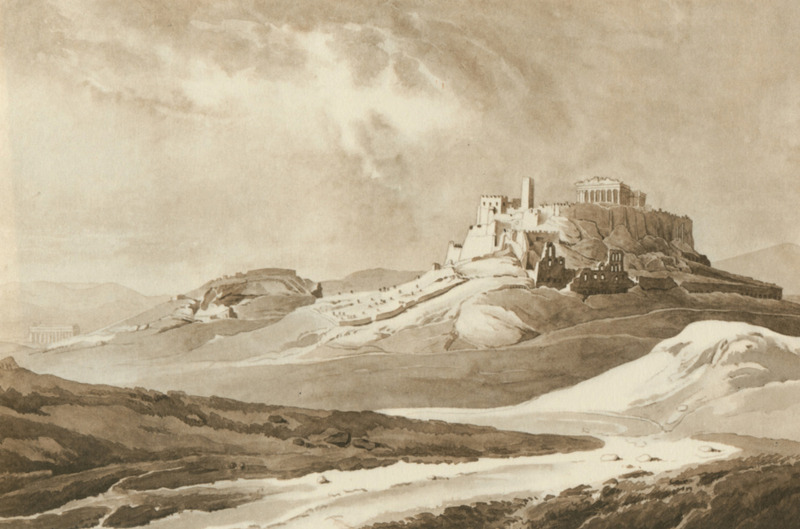
The Acropolis with the Areopagos to the left, from the southwest.

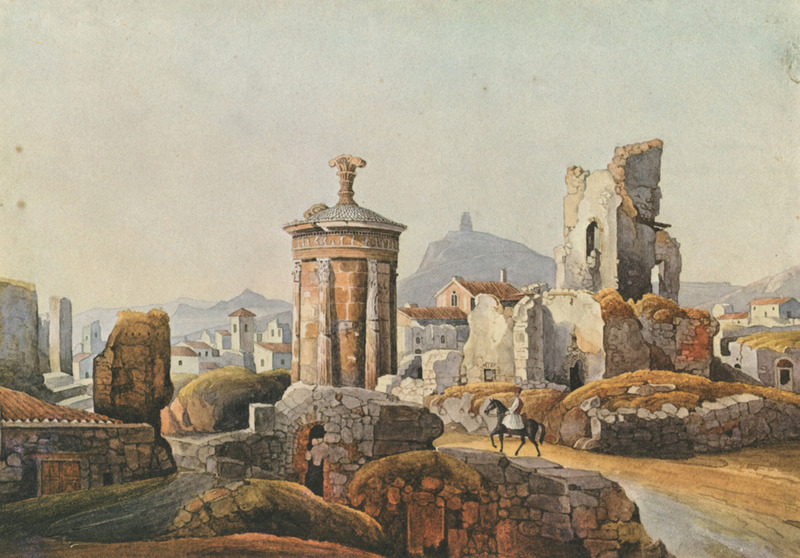
The Choregic monument of Lysicrates and the ruined quarter of Fanari, from the northeast.

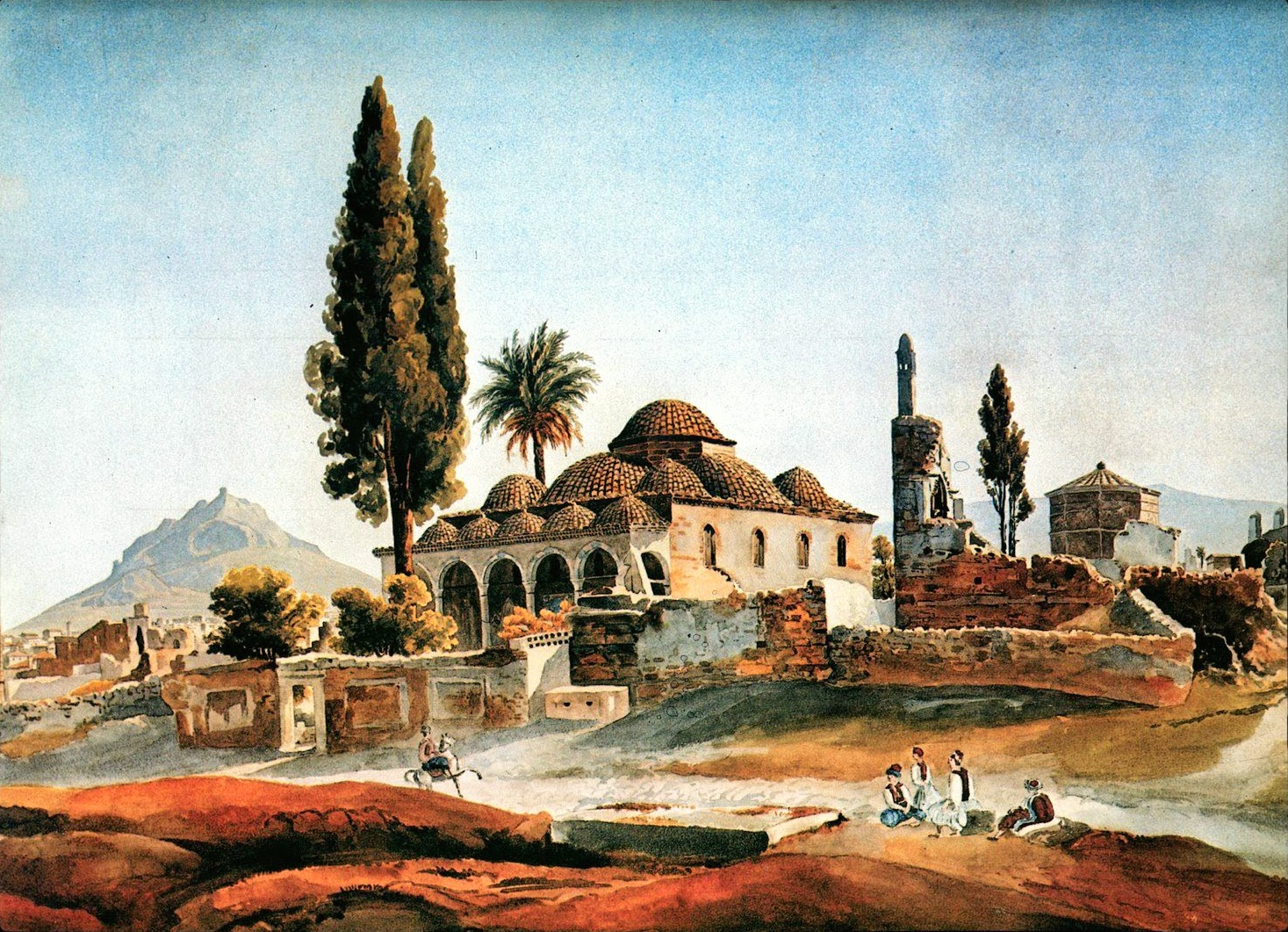
Fethiye mosque and the Horologion of Andronikos Kyrristos (Tower of the Winds), from the southwest.

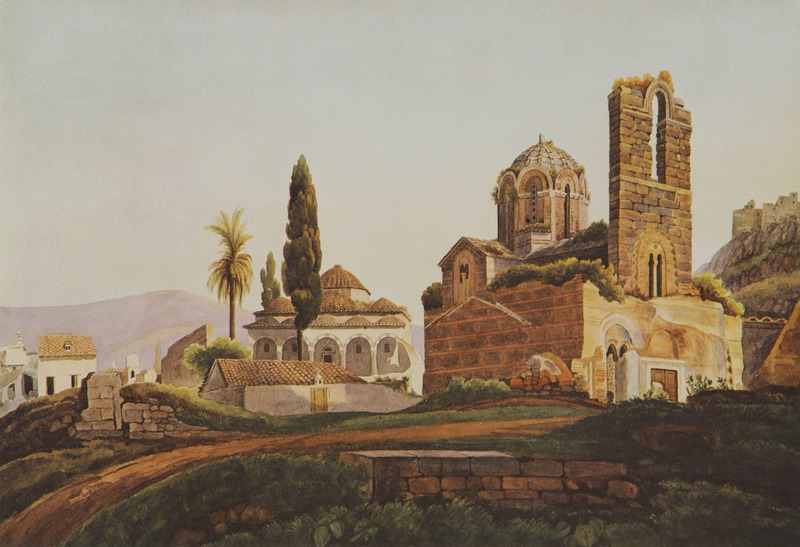
The church of the Patriarchs and the Fethiye mosque in Athens.

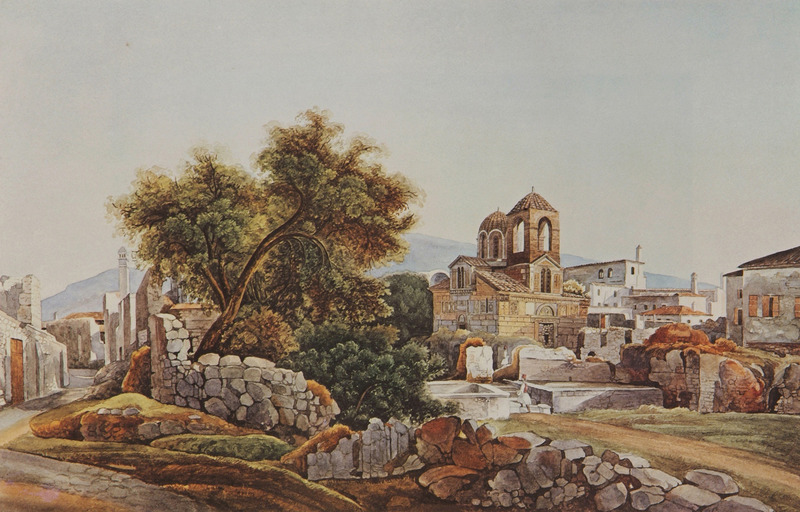
The church of Panagia Gorgopikoos and the ruined quarter of Gorgopiko, from the north-west.

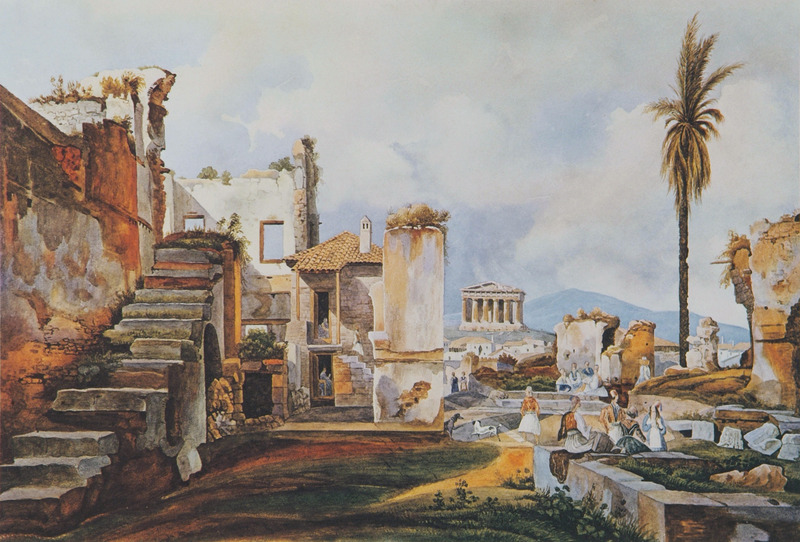
Ruined houses east of Theseion quarter in Athens.

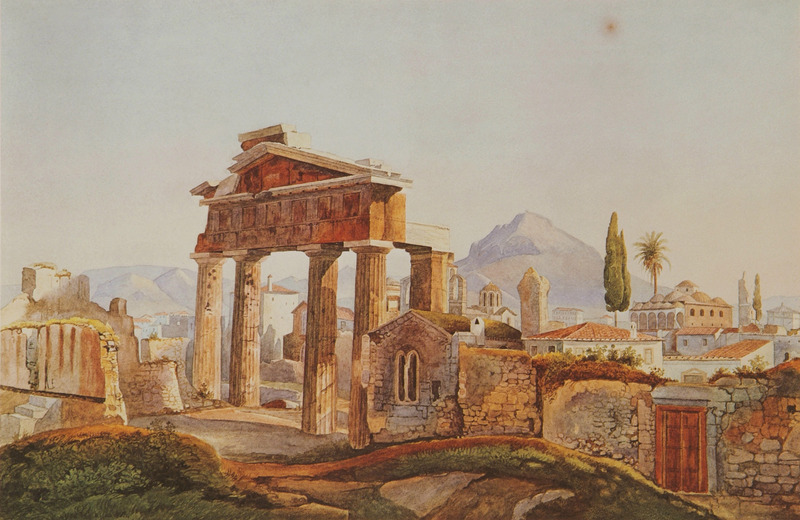
View of Athens from the west, looking towards the Gate of Athena Archegetis (Pazaroporta).

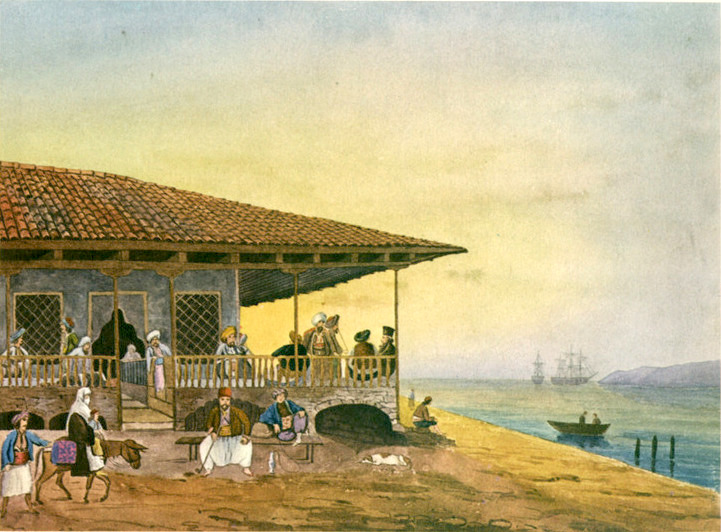
Waterfront café in Patras.

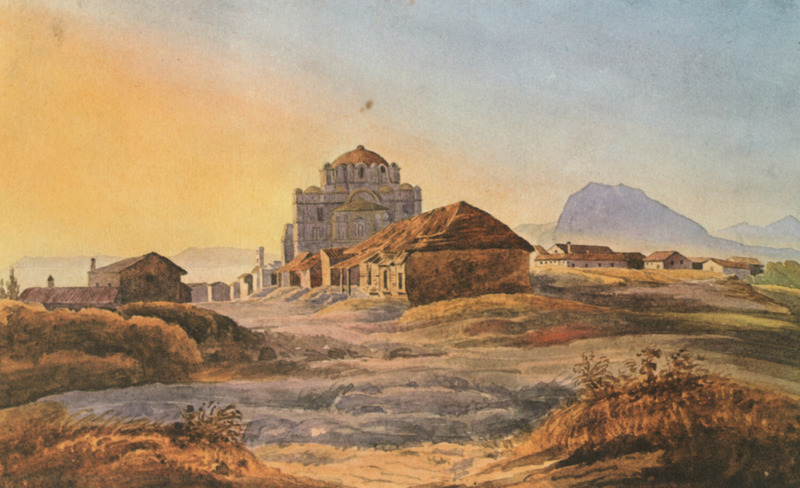
The Church of Pantokrator in Patras.

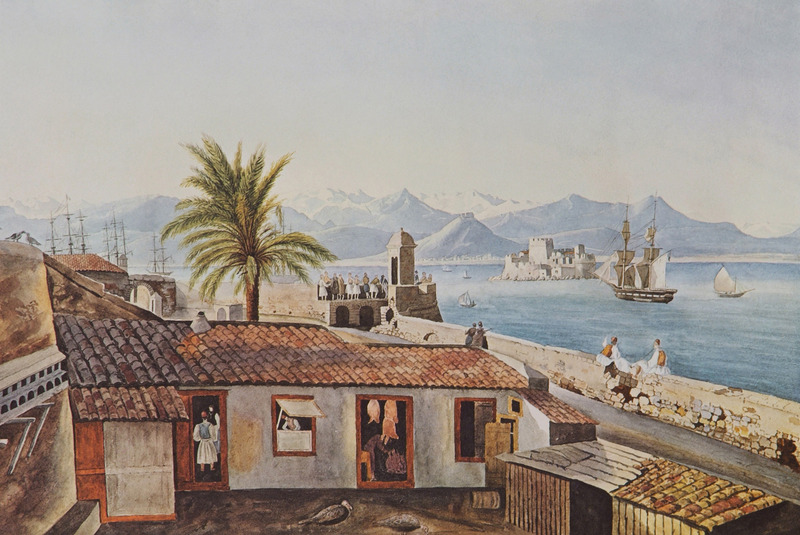
The quarter of Hourmadia and the Bourtzi in Nafplion.

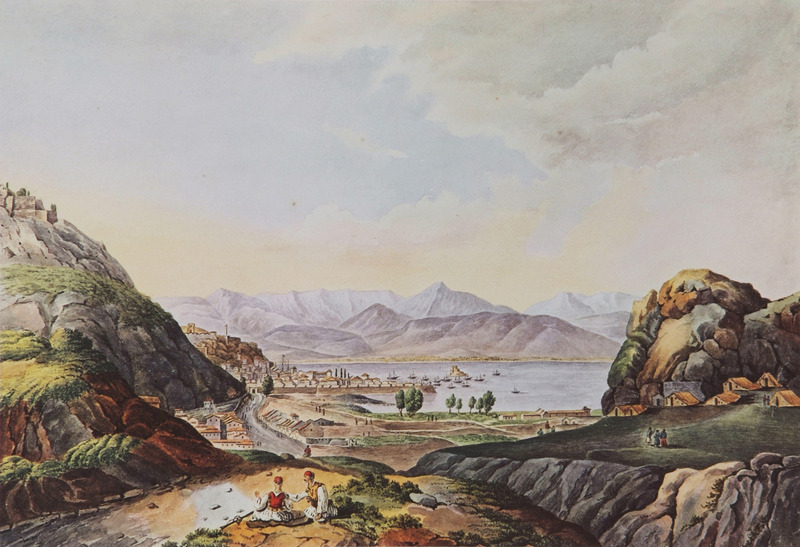
Nafplion from the northeast, seen from Pronoia.

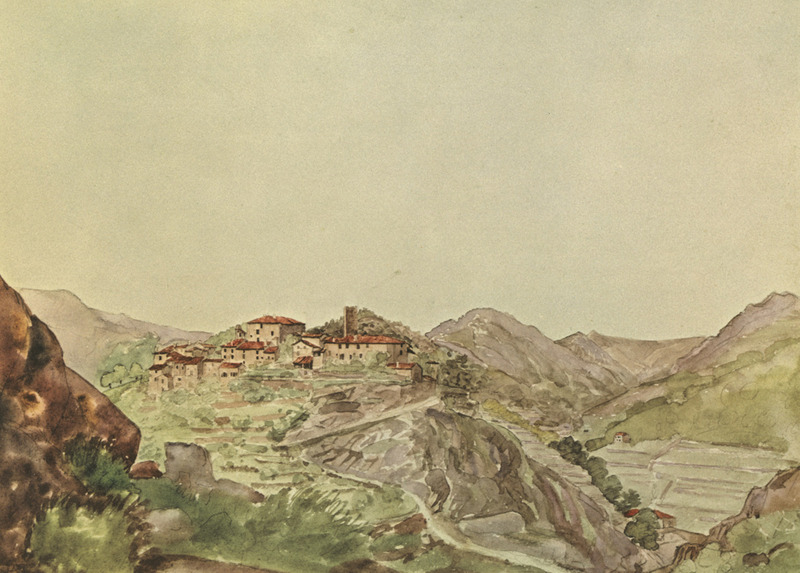
Village.

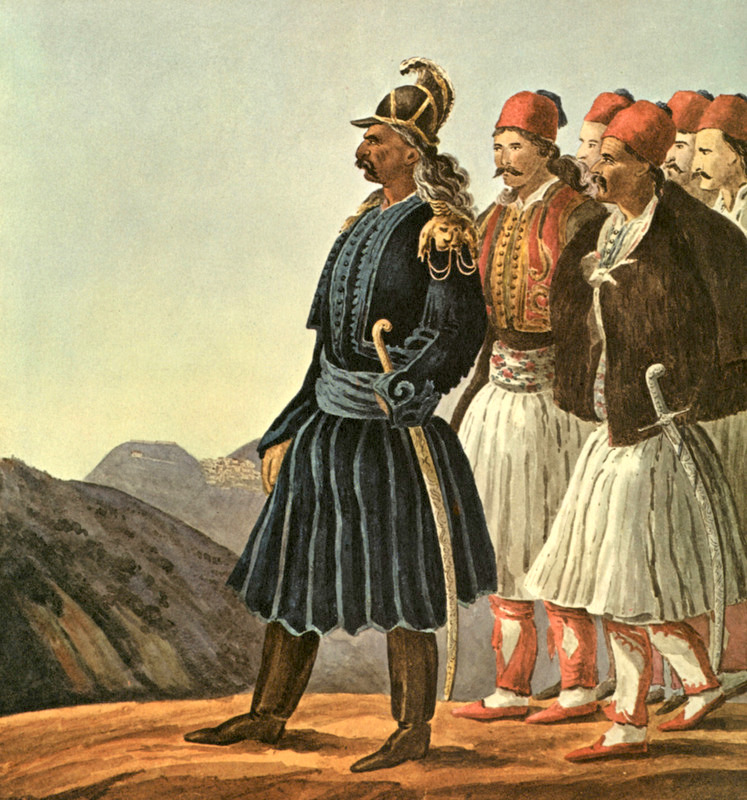
Theodoros Kolokotronis and his personal escort.

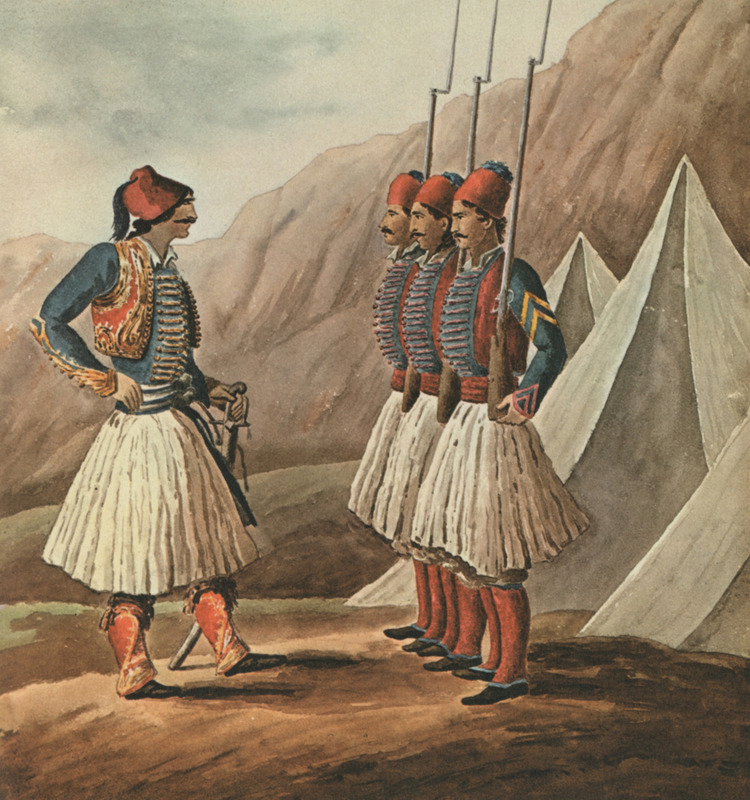
Members of the "Typikon" on parade at Pronia (1830) in Nafplion.

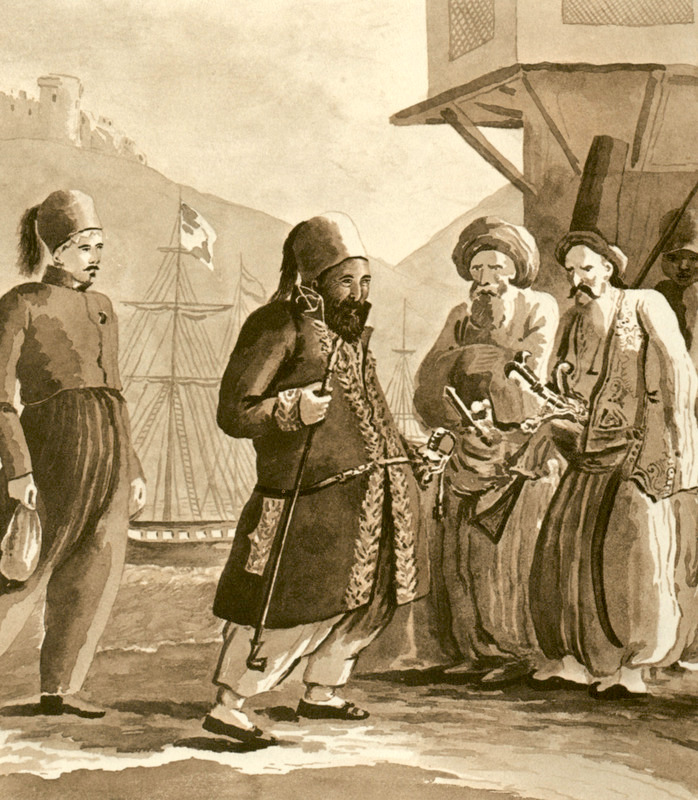
Ibrahim Pasha in the harbour of Navarin en 1828.

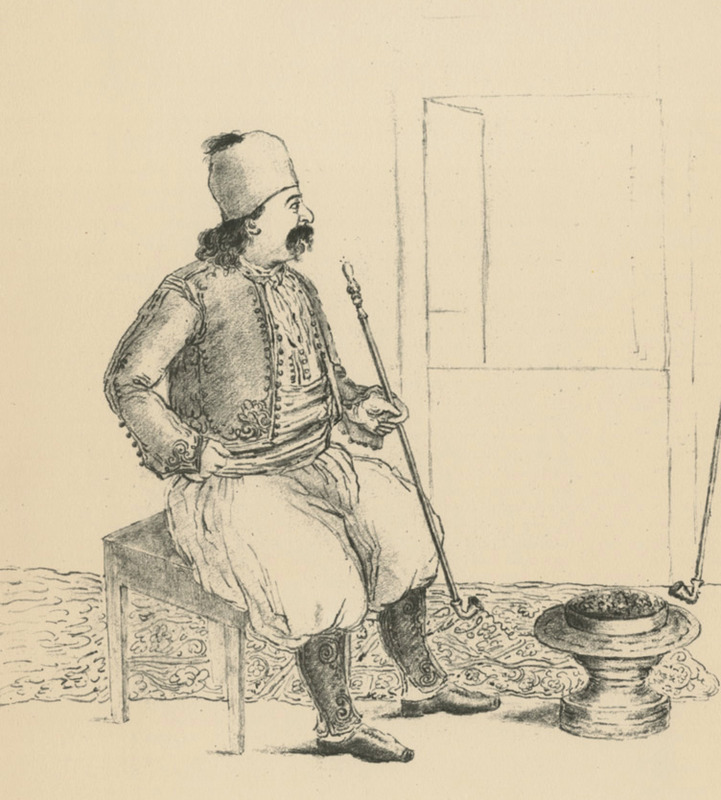
Petrobey Mavromichalis.

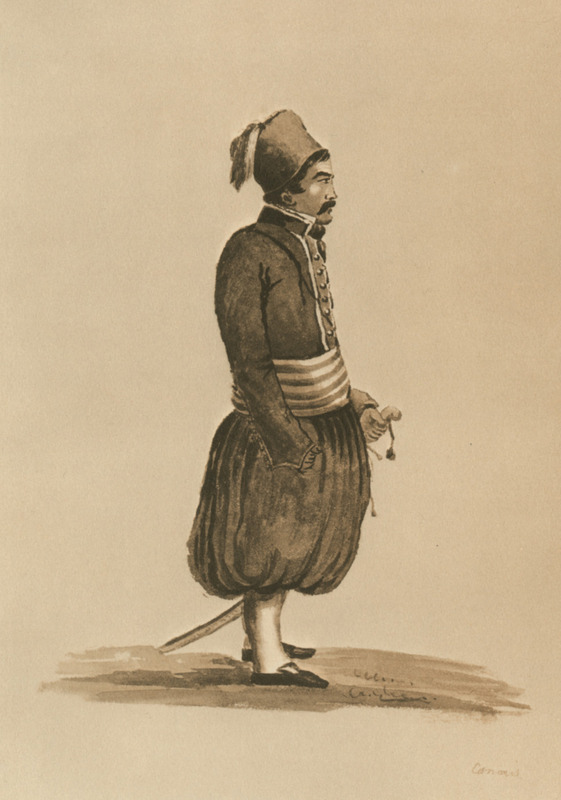
Konstantinos Kanaris.

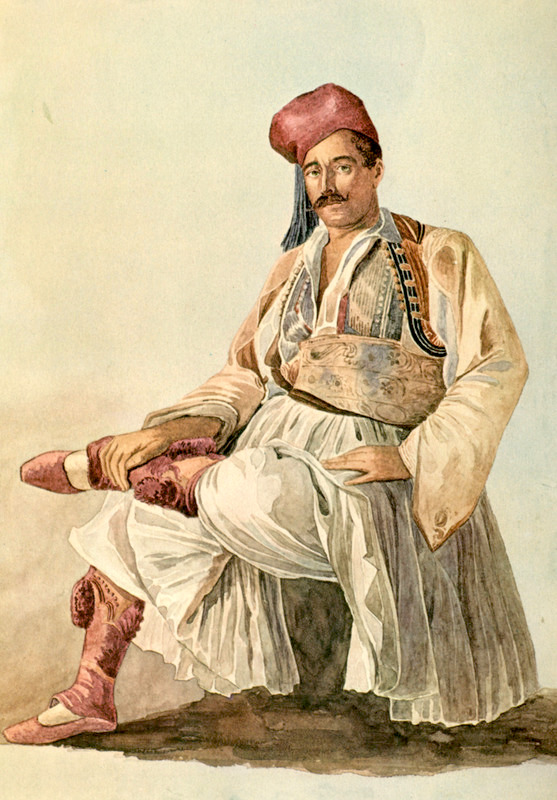
Greek chieftain.

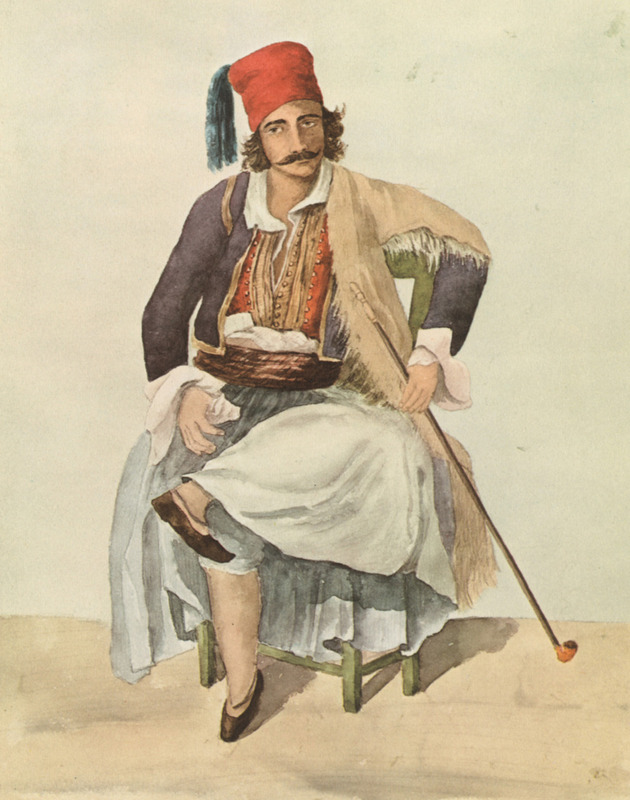
Man smoking.

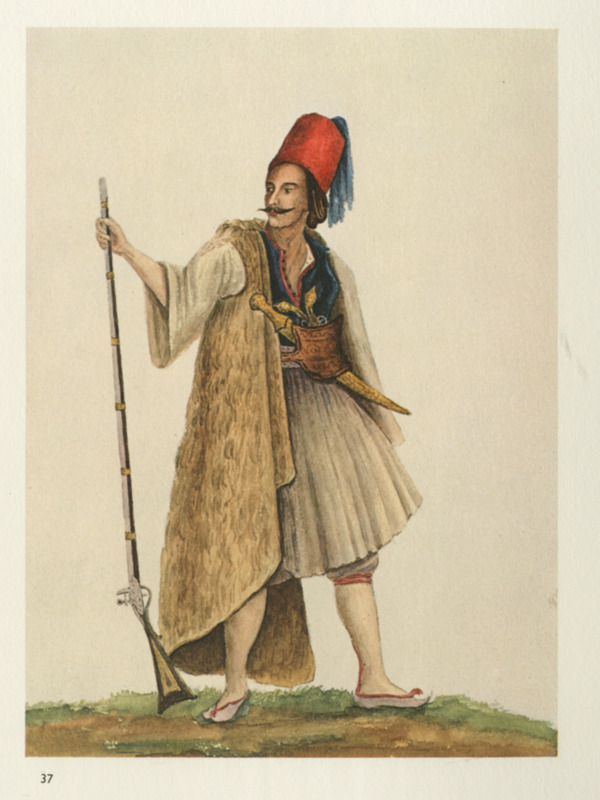
Soldier with flintlock.

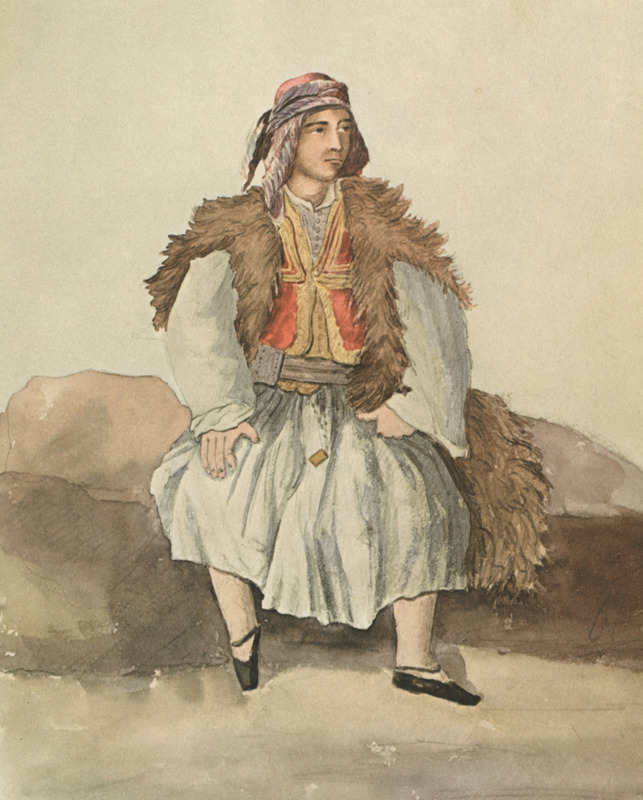
Young peasant.

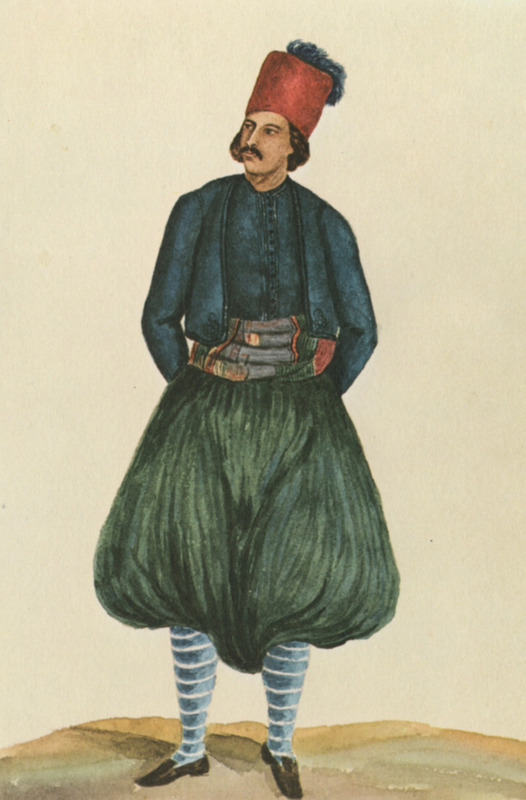
Islander.

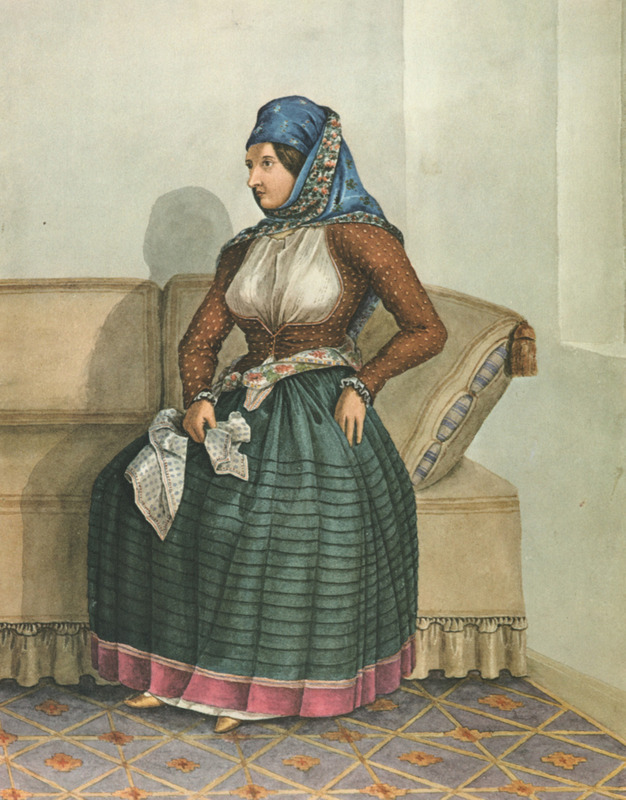
Young woman from the Greek islands.

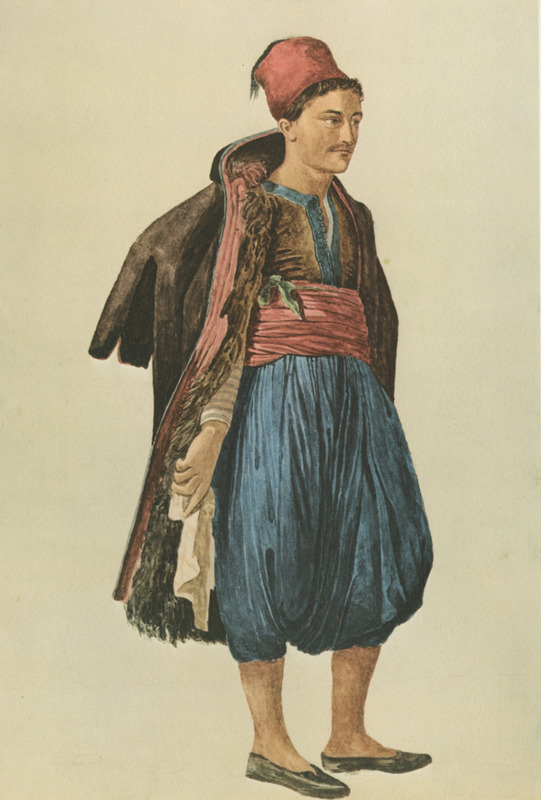
Young man from the Greek islands.

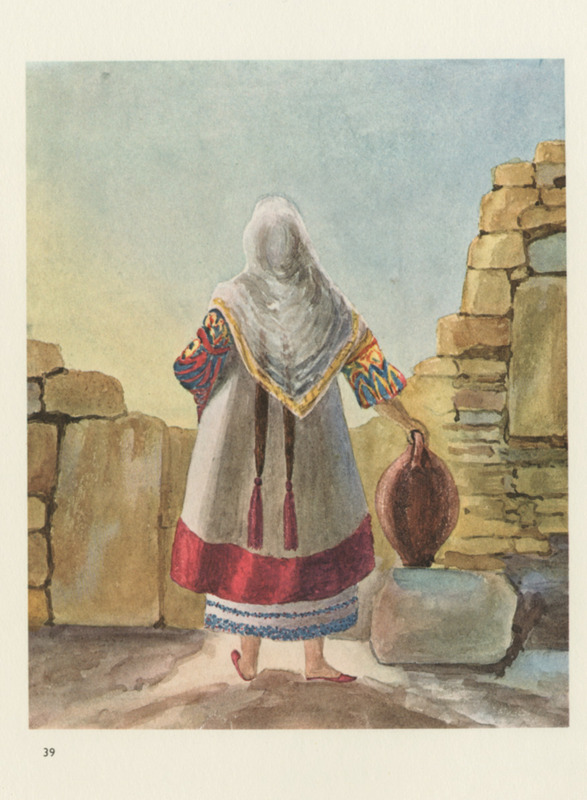
Woman gazing at the horizon.

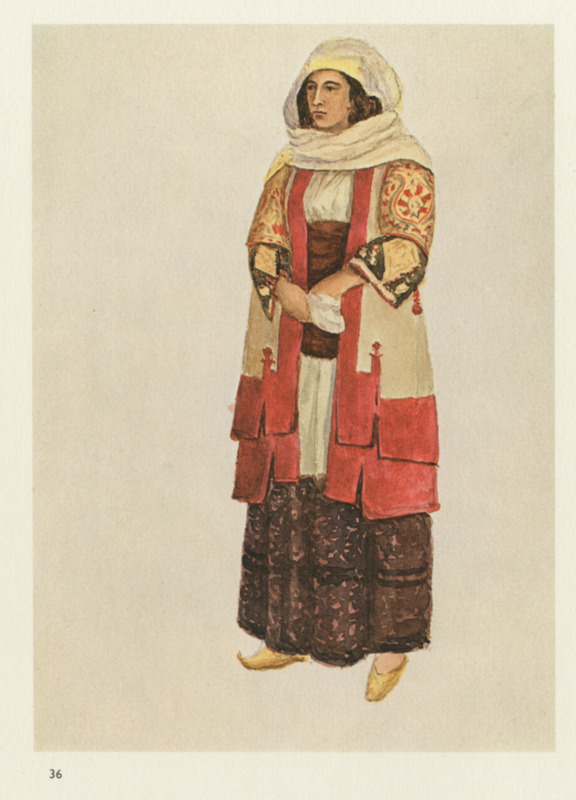
Woman from Attica.

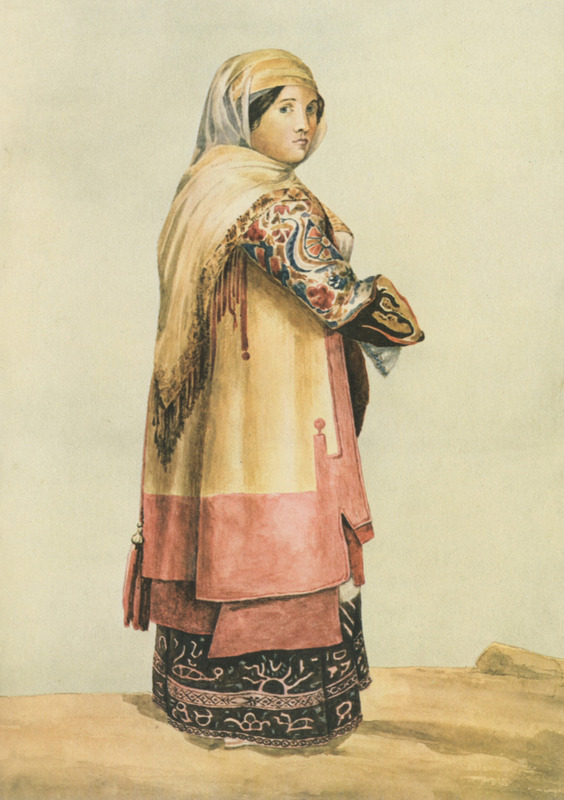
Newly married woman from Attica.

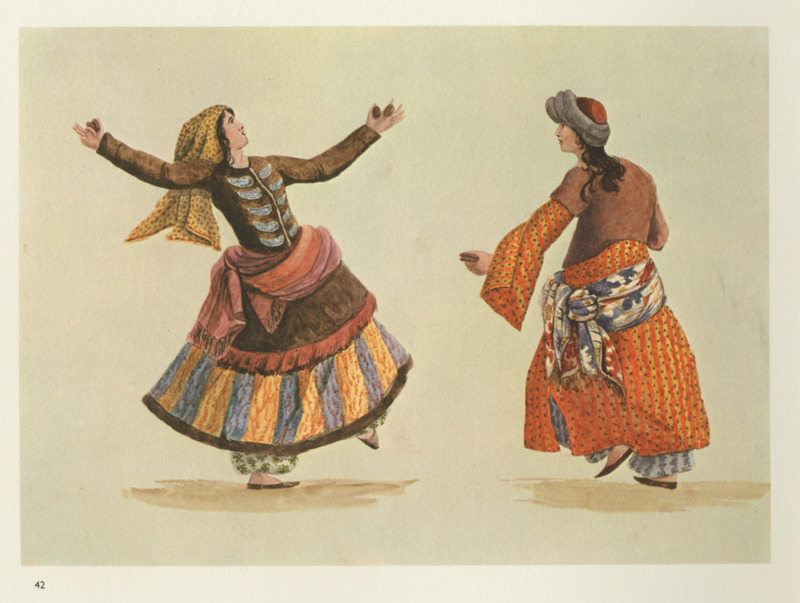
Women dancers.

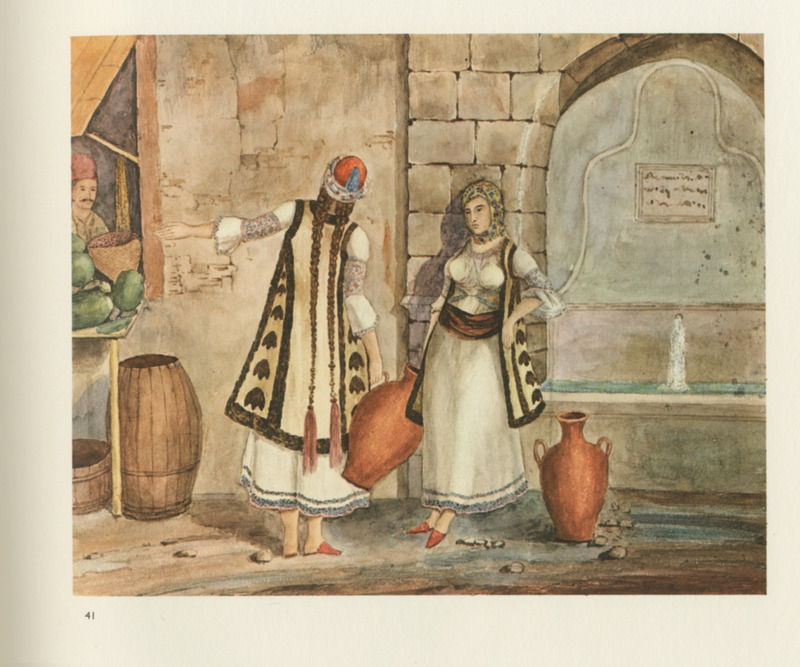
Scene at a fountain in the centre of Athens.

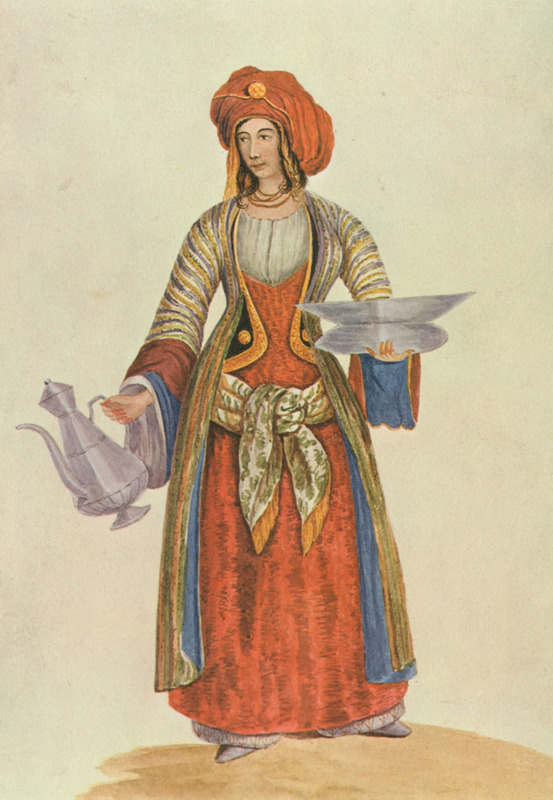
Greek woman from Istanbul with washbowl and pitcher.

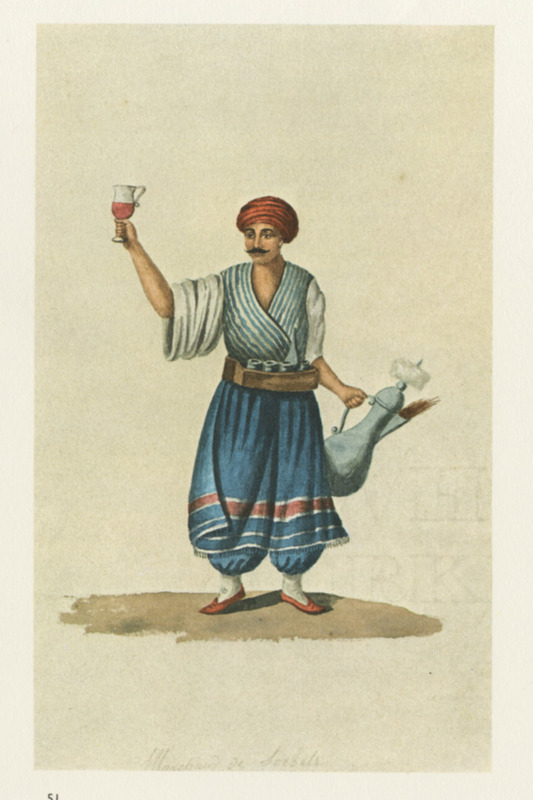
Itinerant sherbet seller.

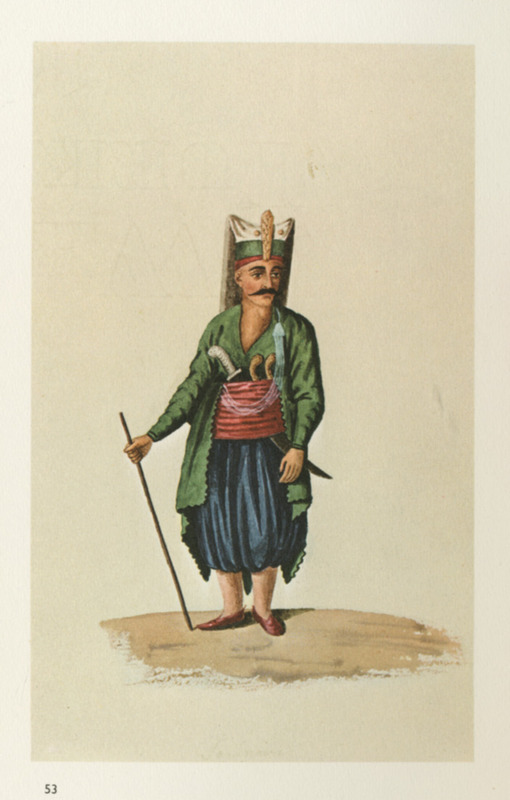
Janissary.

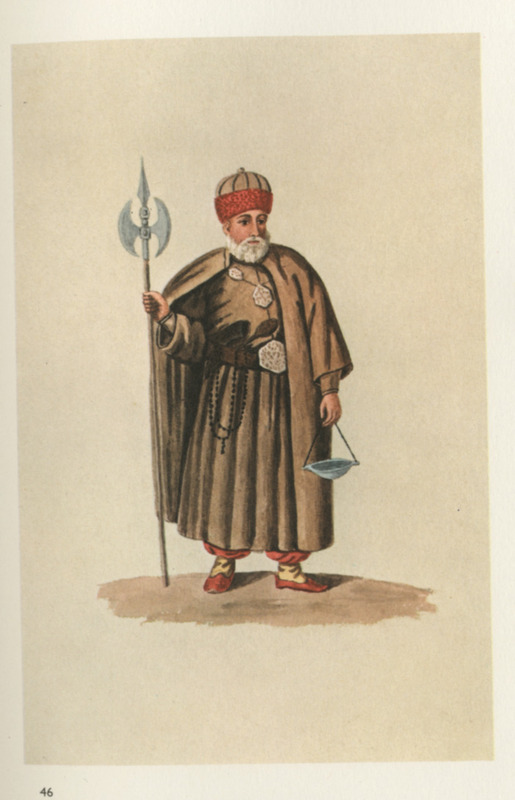
Dervish.

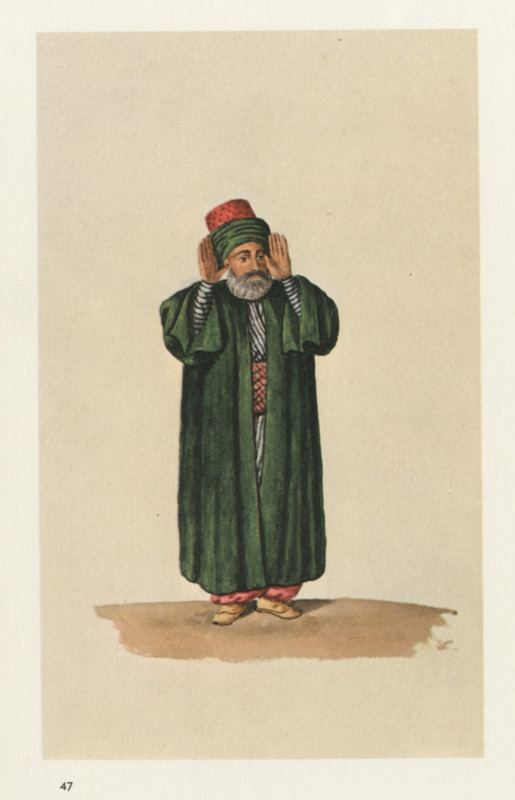
Muezin.

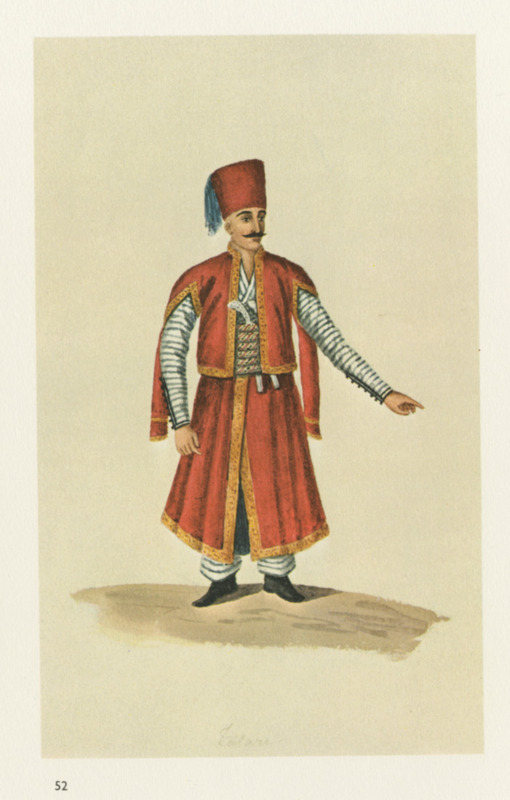
Τatar.

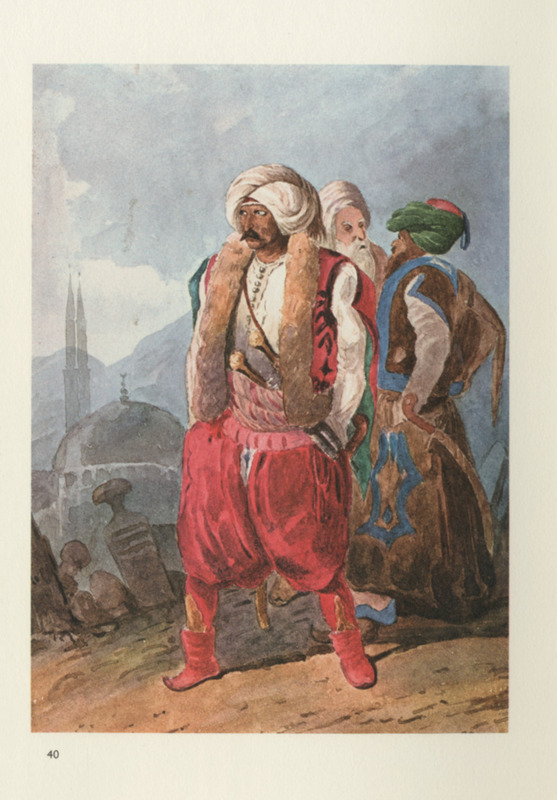
Turkish soldier.

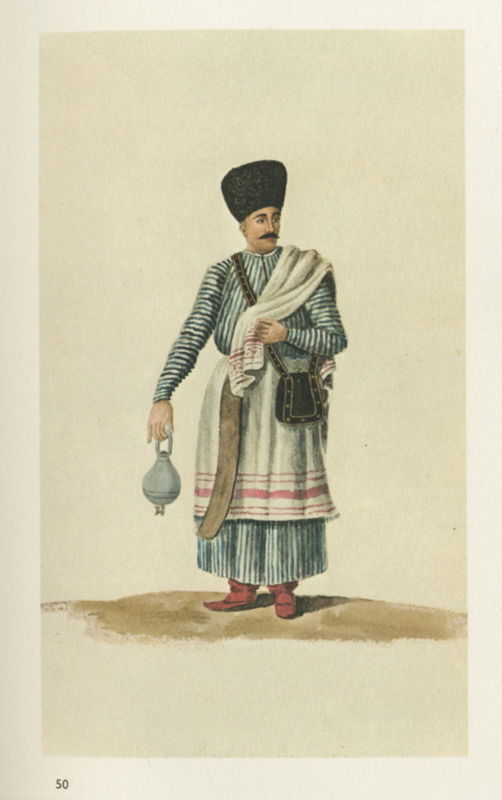
Itinerant Armenian barber.

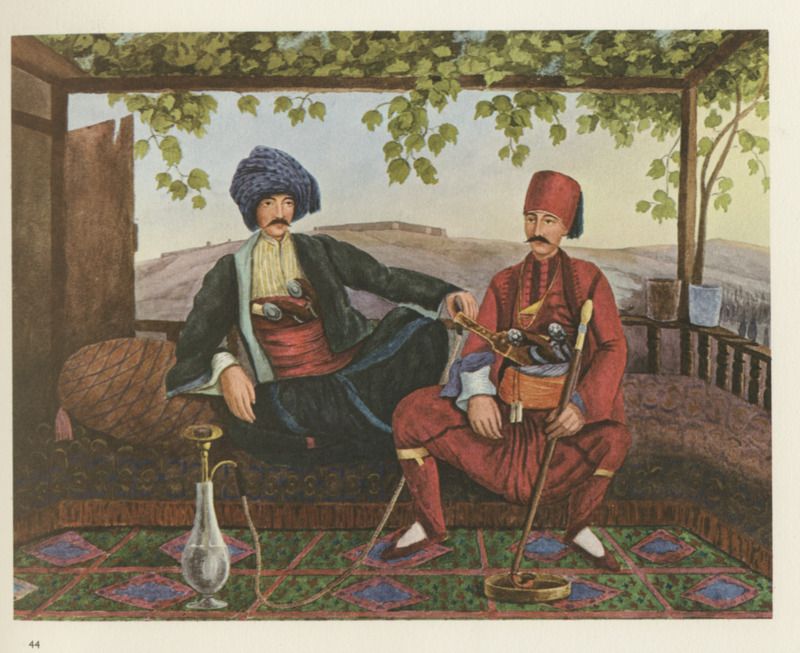
Men smoking in the shade of a trellis.

== Bibliography ==
- (in French) Henri Beraldi, Cent ans aux Pyrénées, Paris, 1898–1904, sept volumes in-8°. Rééditions par « Les Amis du Livre Pyrénéen », Pau, 1977, puis par la « Librairie des Pyrénées et de Gascogne », Pau, 2001.
- (in French) Yiannis Saïtas et coll., L'œuvre de l'expédition scientifique de Morée 1829-1838, Edited by Yiannis Saïtas, Editions Melissa, 2011 (1re Partie) - 2017 (2nde Partie).
- (in French) Pierre Peytier, Émile Puillon Boblaye, Aristide-Camille Servier, Notice sur les opérations géodésiques exécutées en Morée, en 1829 et 1830, par MM.Peytier, Puillon-Boblaye et Servier; suivie d’un catalogue des positions géographiques des principaux points déterminés par ces opérations (Gallica - BnF), Bulletin de la Société de géographie, v. 19 n°117–122 (Janvier – Juin 1833)
- (in English) Pierre Peytier, The Peytier Album, Liberated Greece and the Morea Scientific Expedition, in the Stephen Vagliano Collection, publié par la Banque Nationale de Grèce, Athènes, 1971.
