= Michael Vasileiou =

Greek businessman

Michael Vasileiou (Greek: Μιχαήλ Βασιλείου) was a Greek 19th-century merchant and financier, born in Gjirokastër, Ottoman Empire (now in Albania) as the brother of Alexandros Vasileiou, merchant, scholar and student of Adamantios Korais, a major figure of the Greek Enlightenment movement.

Vasileiou traded in the capital, Constantinople (now Istanbul), where he lived most of his life and worked among the more successful Ottoman Greeks. He funded several issues of the Hermes o Logios (Greek: Λόγιος Ερμής), a literary newspaper published in Vienna, as well the Greek translation of French codex for merchants (Greek: Γαλλικός κώδιξ για εμπόρους, in 1817).

Two of Vasileiou's daughters (Efrosyni and Smaragda) married Mellas family members who were also financially strong in the Greek community.
