= Fethiye Mosque (Athens) =

Former mosque in Athens, Greece

- Φετιχιέ τζαμί
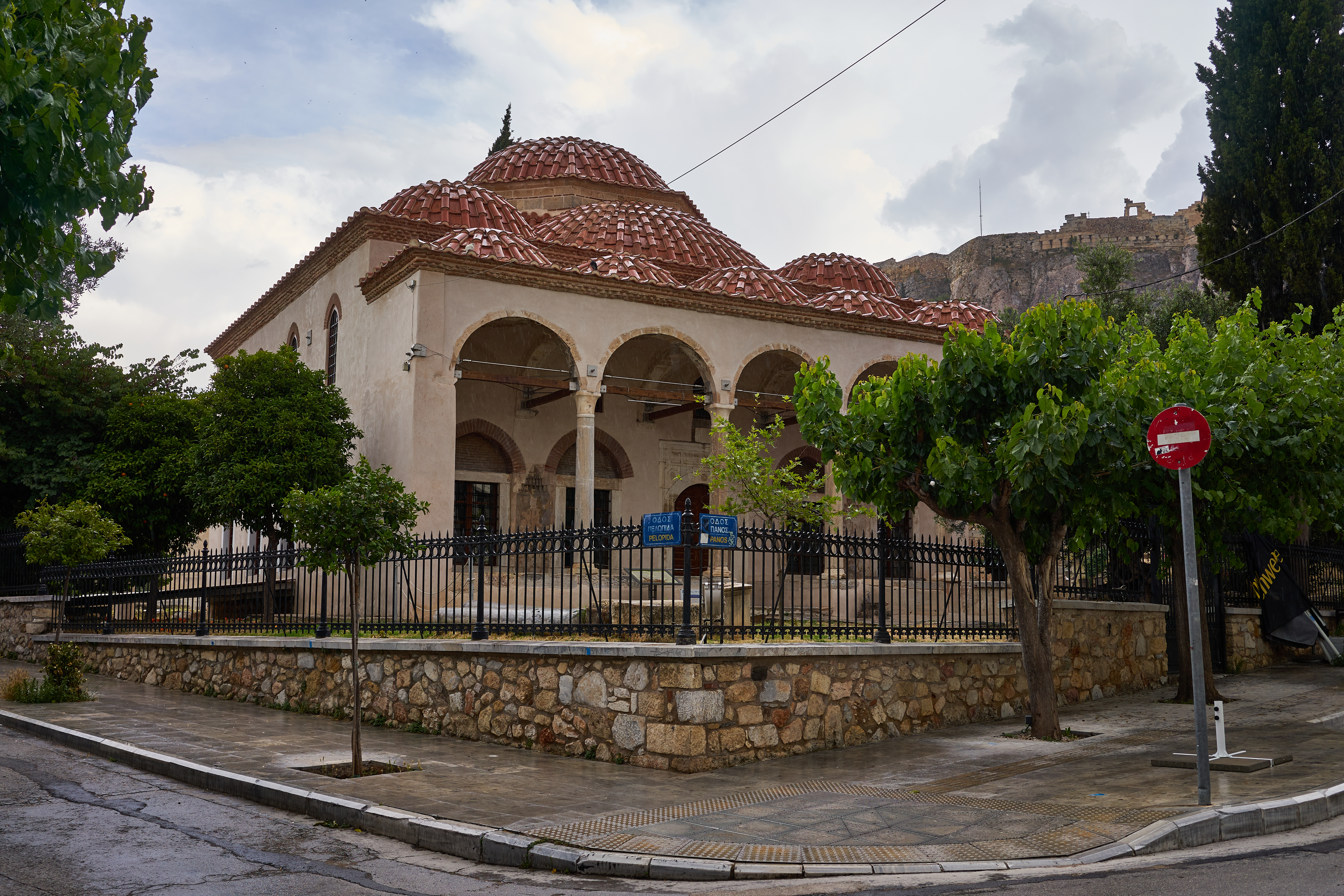

- Location of the former mosque in Greece

Religion
- Affiliation: Islam (former)
- Ecclesiastical or organizational status: Mosque (1670–1834); Profane use (1834–2010)
- Status: Abandoned (as a mosque); Repurposed (as a cultural centre)

Location
- Location: Athens
- Country: Greece
- Interactive map of Fethiye Mosque
- Coordinates: 37°58′28″N 23°43′37″E

Architecture
- Type: Mosque
- Style: Ottoman

Specifications
- Domes: 1 (main); many (others)
- Minaret: 1 (since demolished)

The Fethiye Mosque (Greek: Φετιχιέ τζαμί; Turkish: Fethiye Camii, lit. 'Mosque of the Conquest') is a former mosque in central Athens, Greece. Completed in the 17th-century during the Ottoman-era, the mosque was repurposed after Greek independence in 1834, it fell into disrepair, but after renovations it was reopened to the public in 2017 for cultural purposes.

== History ==
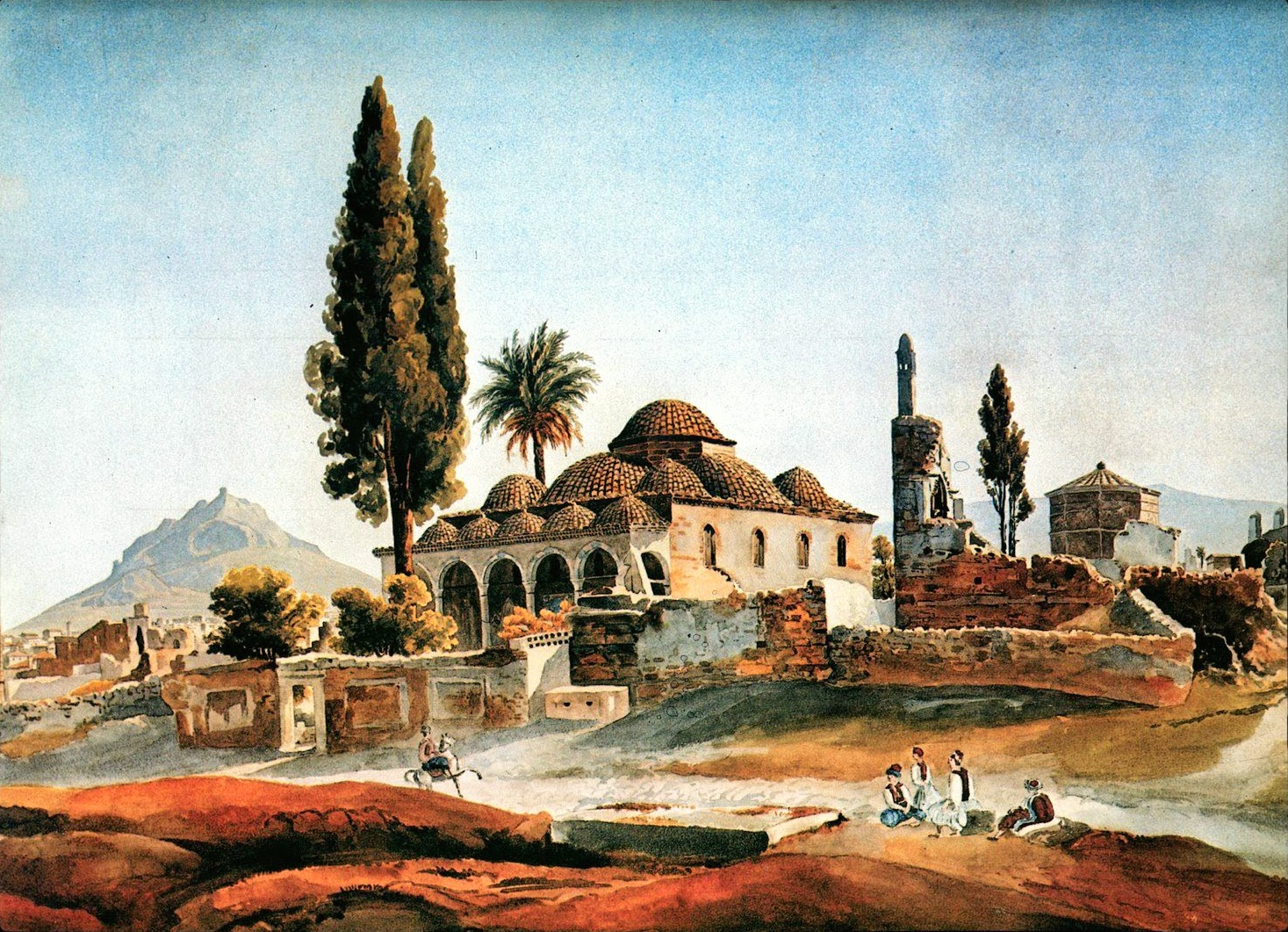
The mosque in the 1830s, with the demolished minaret to the right and the Tower of the Winds further to the right

The Fethiye Mosque is located on the northern side of the ancient Roman Agora in Athens, near the Tower of the Winds, and was built on the ruins of a Christian basilica from the middle Byzantine period (8th/9th centuries). The Christian church was converted into a mosque in 1456/58, soon after the Ottoman conquest of the Duchy of Athens, to coincide with the visit to the city by Sultan Mehmed the Conqueror in 1458.

Only a fragment of the mihrab survives from this mosque, which was demolished and replaced by the present structure between 1668 and 1670. The new mosque comprises a porch and a large rectangular main hall, crowned by a dome supported by four pillars. The central dome is flanked by half-domes on each side, and by smaller domes on each corner. The porch is supported by five arches, each crowned by a small dome, resting on masonry on the sides and four pillars in the middle. During Ottoman times, it was commonly known as the "Wheatmarket Mosque" (Τζαμί του Σταροπάζαρου). During the brief occupation of the city by the Venetian forces in the Morean War (October 1687 – May 1688), the mosque was converted by the Venetians into a Catholic church, dedicated to Dionysius the Areopagite.

Following the outbreak of the Greek War of Independence, in 1824 the disused mosque was used as a school by the Filomousos Eteria of Athens. At about the same time, or shortly after the end of the war, the mosque's minaret was torn down. From 1834, after Greek independence, and until the early 20th century, it was used successively as a barracks, a military prison and finally as a military bakery, at which point additions were made to the building to house the bakery's kilns. From the early 20th century it is used mostly as a storage place for various finds from the excavations in the Agora and the Acropolis of Athens.

Except for the removal of recent additions and the restoration to its original shape in 1935, the mosque had never undergone a complete restoration, and by 2010 had developed serious structural problems. In autumn 2010, the Greek Ministry of Culture ordered the emptying of the building from the various antiquities stored there, and the beginning of the process to restore it and open it to the public. The decision was sanctioned by Greece's Central Archaeological Council in 2013, paving the way for its restoration and its opening to the public as a space for cultural events. Following extensive restoration and renovation, the mosque was reopened to the public in 2017, and cultural exhibitions are held there.

== See also ==
- Islam in Greece
- List of former mosques in Greece
- Ottoman Greece
