= Hellenic Museum of Zagora =

Museum in Zagora, Greece

The Hellenic Museum of Zagora, also known as the Greek Museum and the Old School of Rigas, is a historic school museum in Magnesia, Greece.
