= Alexandros Vasileiou =

Greek businessman

Alexandros Vasileiou (Greek: Αλέξανδρος Βασιλείου, 1760–1818) was a Greek merchant and scholar, one of the representatives of the modern Greek Enlightenment.

He was born in Gjirokastër, Ottoman Empire (today's Albania). Vasileiou was one of many Greek merchants in the 18th-19th centuries that were involved in the fields of education and literature. A. Vasileiou played an essential role in the Greek Enlightenment movement. His contact with Adamantios Korais, a major figure of Greek literature at that time, was of unique importance for him, while he lived in Paris.

Correspondence between the two men was continuous. A. Vasileiou adopted the ideas of Korais to the Greek language question and confronted the conservative scholar Neofitos Doukas. He was the author of a number of articles in the Hermes o Logios magazine (a Greek literary magazine, published in Vienna). At the same time he supported financially the publication of several issues of Logios Ermis and other literature material.

Because of his trading businesses he lived in several cities throughout Europe: Amsterdam, Marseille, Lyon, Paris, Vienna, Trieste. In Trieste, he was also consul of the Ottoman Empire. He died in Trieste in 1818, a few days after declaring bankruptcy. His brother, Michael Vasileiou, was also a notable scholar and merchant living in Constantinople.

== Sources ==
- Culture and nationalism in nineteenth-century Eastern Europe. Roland Sussex, John Christopher Eade. Slavica Publishers, 1985. ISBN 978-0-89357-146-7.
- The Movement for Greek independence, 1770-1821: a collection of documents Richard Clogg. Macmillan, 1976.
- Modern Greek Philosophy Research Center. University of Ioanina: Alexandros Vasileiou biography. Epirotiki Estia (Greek)
