= Hermes o Logios =

Greek periodical

Hermes o Logios Ἑρμῆς ὁ Λόγιος
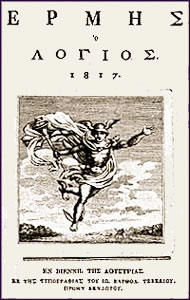
- Issue of 1817
- Editor: Anthimos Gazis, Theoklitos Farmakidis, Konstantinos Kokkinakis
- Categories: Science, History, Arts
- First issue: 1811
- Final issue: 1821
- Language: Greek

Hermes o Logios, also known as Logios Ermis (Greek: Ἑρμῆς ὁ Λόγιος, "Hermes the Scholar") was a Greek periodical printed in Vienna, Austria, from 1811 to 1821. It is regarded as the most significant and longest running periodical of the period prior to the outbreak of the Greek War of Independence, containing contributions by key scholars and intellectuals. Hermes o Logios aimed at creating intellectual contacts between the Greek communities of the Ottoman Empire and the Diaspora in Western Europe, as well as the preparing national awakening of the Greek people.

The periodical started its circulation after a proposal by Adamantios Korais, a leading figure of the modern Greek Enlightenment, who had stressed the need of a printed medium, written in vernacular Greek. This initiative was supported by the Philological Society in Bucharest, an organization consisting of Greek intellectuals. Hermes o Logios reflected the style of other European periodicals of early 19th century and reviewed developments in arts and sciences, being an important channel for bringing contemporary intellectual movements to the attention of the Greeks that lived in the Ottoman Empire. It was closed down by the Austrian authorities when the Greek War of Independence broke out.

== Background ==
During the 18th century the ideals of the Western European Enlightenment and the French Revolution became widely known to the Greek scholars. They soon realized the potential of these new ideals, and especially of popular freedom and sovereignty for their own national struggle against Ottoman rule. Adamantios Korais, a humanist scholar and leading figure of the modern Greek Enlightenment, had stressed the desirability of a printed medium, written in the vernacular language, in order to spread these ideas to the Greek people, that lived in the Ottoman Empire and the Diaspora in Western Europe as well. Korais explained about the necessity of a periodical that would gather material from political and philological newspapers of the enlightened peoples of Europe and contain reports from Ottoman-ruled Greece. He also stressed that this should be edited by a man of learning, and proposed that his friend Anthimos Gazis, scholar and Orthodox priest in Vienna, would be the most suitable person.

Vienna became the right place for such an initiative, since it was already the most important publishing centre for the Greek diaspora. In 1783 the Austrian Emperor had authorized the free printing of Greek books in the city, while in 1790 the first Greek newspaper, named Ephimeris, was published there.

== History ==
=== Establishment (1811–1813) ===
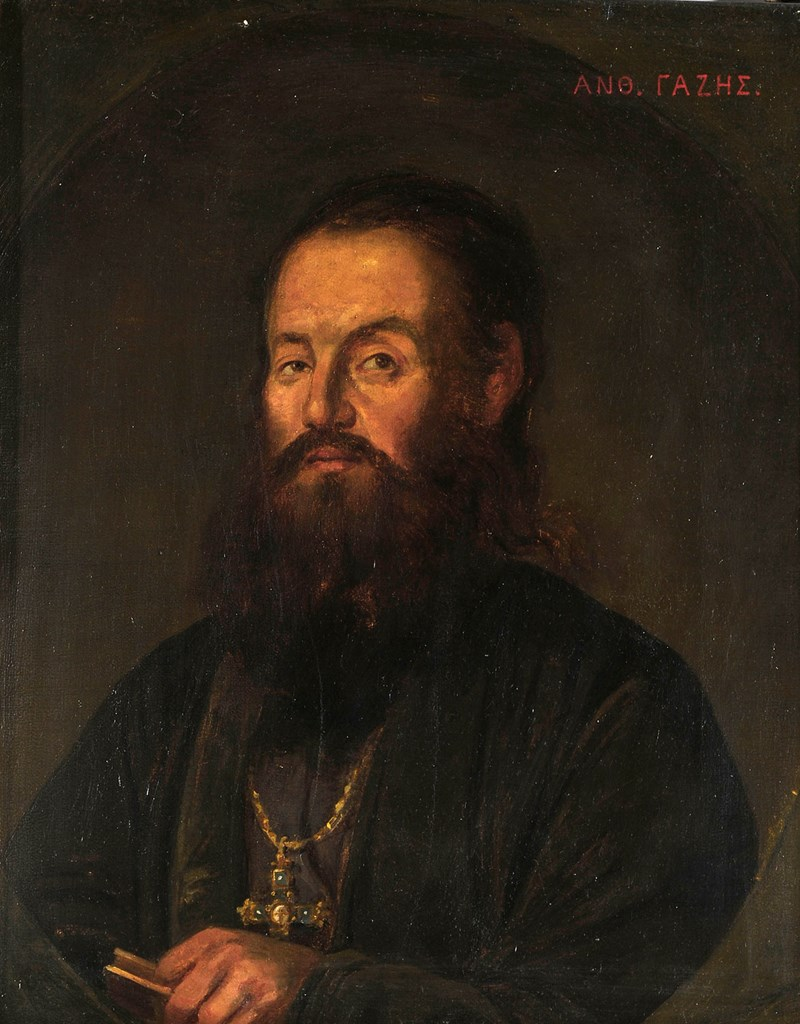
Anthimos Gazis, one of the main editors of Hermes o Logios during 1811–1813.

Hermes o Logios was established with the support of the Philological Society in Bucharest, an organization consisting of Greek intellectuals headed by the local Greek Orthodox Bishop, Ignatios II. The Society's goals, as published in the first issue of the periodical, were "the awakening to the progress of learning" and "the cultivation of the newer Greek language". Apart from Hermes o Logios, the Society supervised also a Greek-language school, financed translations of schoolbooks into modern Greek and provided scholarships for students to study abroad. Ignatios has already stated the need for a philological newspaper, in which each man of learning could publish his ideas, adding that "This is what the wise man Korais advises us to do and he has wisely chosen a worthy man, archimandrite Anthimos Gazis". The members of the Society then all agreed to cover part of the printing expenses.

The first issue of Hermes o Logios was published on January 1, 1811, under the full title Ἑρμῆς ὁ Λόγιος, ἥ Φιλολογικαί Ἀγγελίαι (Hermes the Scholar, or Philological Reports). In the first three years of its existence (1811–1813), Hermes o Logios appeared twice a month and each issue usually consisted of 16 pages. In April 1813, Anthimos Gazis left Vienna and the editorship of the periodical was taken over by Theoklitos Farmakidis, another priest and an even more fanatical supporter of Korais.

=== Crisis and revival (1814–1820) ===
Hermes o Logios faced serious financial problems during this period. When the Russo-Turkish War of 1806–1812 ended, Ignatios was forced to resign and leave Bucharest and its main sponsor, the Philological Society, ceased to exist. In an announcement published as an appendix to the issues of 1813 (dated April 1, 1813), Alexandros Vasileiou, a supporter of Korais and influential personality within the Greek community of Vienna, states this fact, as well as that the periodical had too few subscribers. He therefore called on all readers to canvass for new subscribers; moreover he called upon all scholars to send in their contributions.

During the period 1814–1815, Hermes o Logios reached an absolute low, with seven issues in 1814 and only one in 1815, which consisted of 16 pages written by Korais and directed against his ideological adversary, the conservative scholar, Neophytos Doukas. On the other hand, Gazis returned. In the following years, however, the periodical was subsidized by the princes of Moldavia, Scarlat Callimachi and Michael Soutzos. Apart from the difficulties faced, 1816 was a turning point, as two scholars and adherents of Korais, Theoklitos Farmakidis and Konstantinos Kokkinakis, were placed in charge. Consequently, Hermes o Logios actually became an outlet for Korais and continued to appear without interruption until the Greek War of Independence.

=== Outbreak of the Greek War of Independence (1821) ===
In 1821, the year that the War of Independence broke out, nine issues appeared between January and May. There is a special appendix to the issue of April 1, 1821, containing a Greek translation of an article dated March 29, taken from the Wiener Zeitung, which reports on the uprising of Alexandros Ypsilantis and Tudor Vladimirescu in the Danubian Principalities, that marked the beginning of the Greek War of Independence, and also states the official Austrian standpoint. In the issue of May 1, while Ypsilantis’ campaign was in full swing, the Austrian authorities required the editors to publish the excommunication issued by the Ecumenical Patriarchate of Constantinople, Gregory V, against the architects of this uprising. This was the last issue of Hermes o Logios which then was closed down by the local authorities and Kokkinakis was arrested as a member of the patriotic organization Filiki Etaireia.

== Contents ==
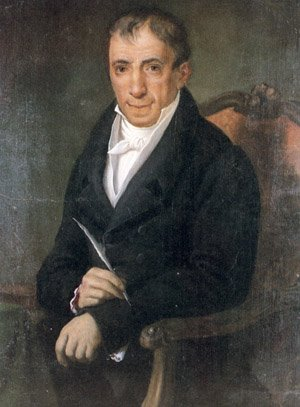
Adamantios Korais, leading figure of the modern Greek Enlightenment that proposed the creation of the periodical.

Hermes o Logios is regarded as the most important Greek periodical of the era of modern Greek Enlightenment, also known as Diafotismos. It appeared regularly over a period of ten and a half years and was the longest-running periodical prior to the outbreak of the Revolution. All volumes cover a total of 5131 pages, with texts on various subjects written by 918 contributors.

=== Arts and sciences ===
Its primary goal was to inform the Greek-speaking public within the Ottoman Empire and in the diaspora. Moreover, in favouring the views of Adamantios Korais it reflected the style of other European periodicals of that era. It reviewed developments in arts and sciences and was an important channel for bringing contemporary intellectual movements to the attention of the Ottoman-ruled Greeks. Additionally, it reproduced catalogues of European scientific books, and exhorted Greek scholars to translate and publish them, like those of Louis Jacques Thénard. The journal also published comments on astronomical observations, experiments and various articles on natural philosophy, which alternated with articles on history and philosophy. Greek scholars used as sources German or French educational books on physics, or translated and published texts on natural philosophy with large circulations in Europe, like the works of Antoine Fourcroy, René Just Haüy, and Jérôme Lalande.

=== Possible revolutionary background ===
Although Hermes o Logios was the most important publication for the transmission of progressive ideas to the Greek people, which should ultimately lead to the emancipation and independence, there was hardly any information of signs of an ongoing revolution, at least on the surface. There was the Austrian censure to be reckoned with, as the reactionary minister Klemens von Metternich and his secret police kept a very close eye on the activities of the local Greek community. The lack of items on politics, polity, law and social structures does not indicate an immanent revolution. Several editors were also members of the patriotic organization Filiki Etaireia and staunch supporters of the struggle for independence, but one can hardly maintain that this fervent patriotism is reflected in the subjects treated inside the periodical. Even in the last years, on the eve of the Greek War of Independence, in the fields of philology, sciences, philanthropy, etc., nothing out of the ordinary was published. On the other hand, there is no doubt that the contributors of Hermes o Logios dreamed of the liberation of the Greek nation and of an independent state.

=== Positions in the Greek language question ===
In respect to the Greek language question, it becomes obvious that from the very beginning Hermes o Logios adhered to Korais’ views. Korais claimed that the appropriate language for the Greek nation should be a vernacular (Demotic) language without foreign words and accepted some views by conservative scholars to retain a tincture of archaism. On the other hand, some of Korais' opponents, both conservatives and vernacularists, published their own magazines in which they attacked his linguistic views.

== Sources ==
- Dēmaras, Kōnstantinos (1972). A history of modern Greek literature. SUNY Press. ISBN 978-0-87395-071-8.
- Mackridge, Peter (2009). Language and National Identity in Greece, 1766-1976. Oxford University Press. p. 124. ISBN 978-0-19-921442-6.
- Janssen, Marjolijne. "The Greek pre-revolutionary discourse as reflected in the periodical Ερμής ο Λόγιος (1811-1821)" (PDF). Cultural nationalism in the Balkans during the nineteenth century.
- Pappas, Vasilis; Ioannis, Karas (1987). "The printed book of physics: The dissemination of scientific thought in Greece 1750-1821 before the Greek revolution, The National Hellenic Research Foundation". Annals of Science. 3 (44): 237–244. doi:10.1080/00033798700200201.
