= Philomuse Society =

Greek learned societies

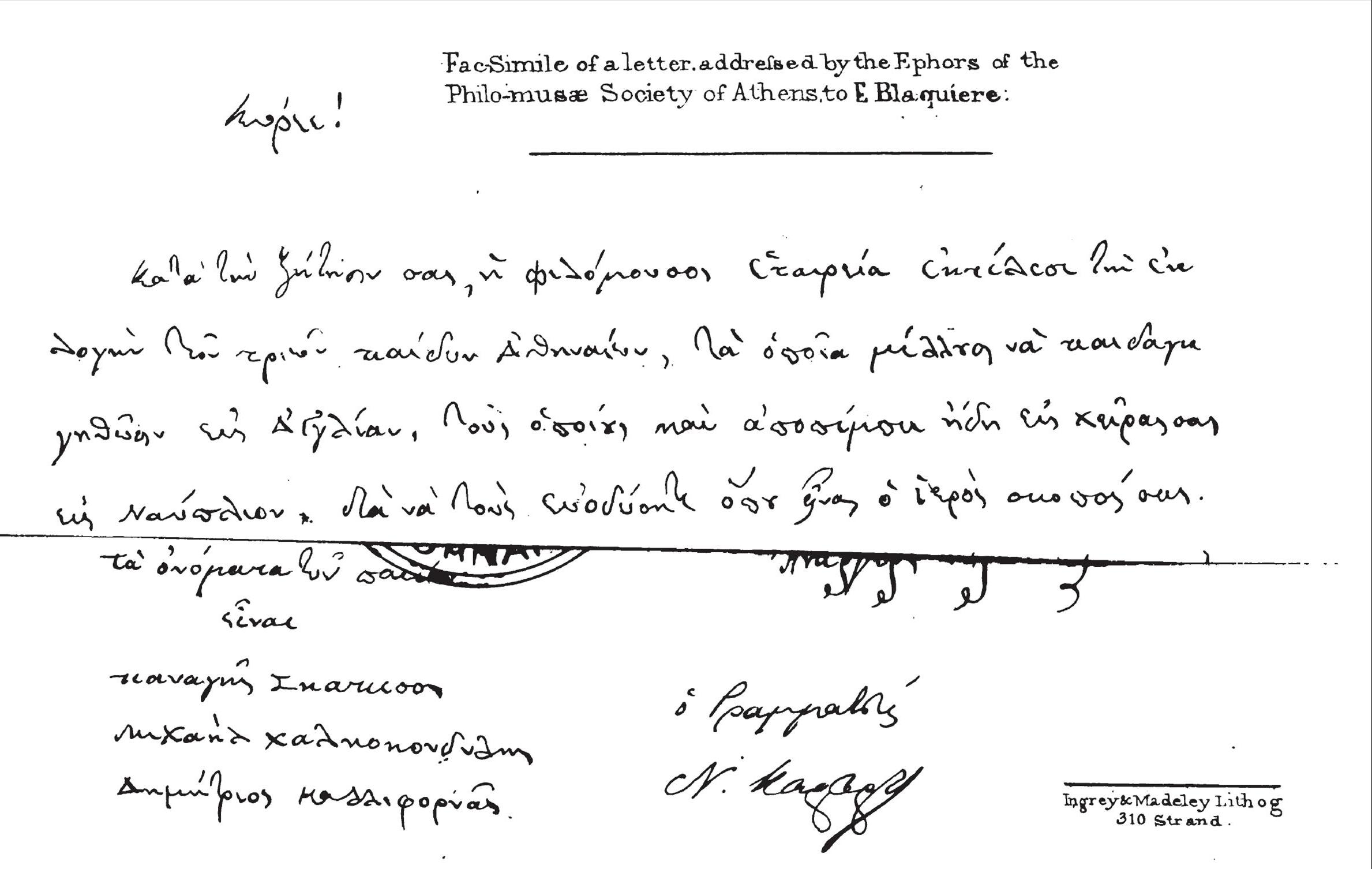
Letter by the Philomuse Society of Athens

Philomuse Society or Philomousos Society (Greek: Φιλόμουσος Εταιρεία, romanized: Filomousos Etaireia, lit. 'Society of Friends of the Muses') was the name of two philological organizations founded during the period of Ottoman rule over Greece before the 1821 Greek Revolution, with the aim of educating the Greeks and promoting philhellenism. These organizations were:

- the Philomuse Society of Athens, founded in Athens in 1812 to support literature and education; and
- the Philomuse Society of Vienna, founded by Ioannis Kapodistrias in 1814, under the aegis of Tsar Alexander I of Russia.

These societies were founded in the wake of the fall of Napoleon's dominion over Europe. The Western-educated Greeks, many of whom had been seized by the spirit of the French Revolution, had invested great hopes in Napoleon, whom they expected to support their aim for independence. Their foundation was part of a wider cultural awakening ("Modern Greek Enlightenment") and a reaction to news of destruction of Greek antiquities by the ignorant population, as well as to calls by pamphlets like the Hellenic Nomarchy to the Greeks to rely on their own strength rather than await foreign assistance.
