= Kaloutsiani Mosque =

Former mosque in Ioannina, Greece

- Τζαμί Καλούτσιανης
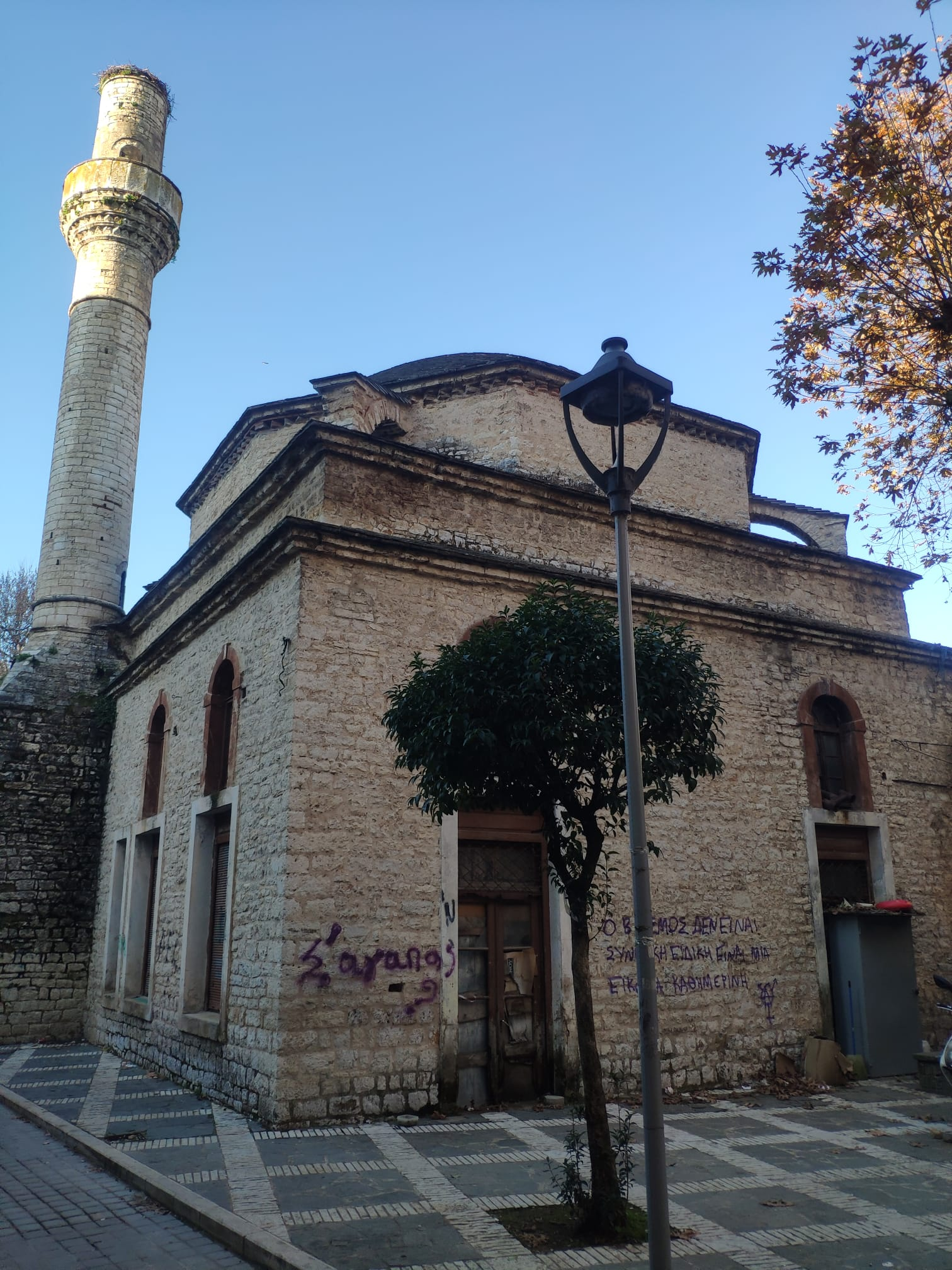

- Location of the former mosque in Greece

Religion
- Affiliation: Islam (former)
- Ecclesiastical or organizational status: Mosque (1740–1913)
- Ownership: Ministry of Culture and Sports (since 2005)
- Status: Abandoned (as a mosque); Restoration in progress

Location
- Location: Ioannina, Epirus
- Country: Greece
- Interactive map of Kaloutsiani Mosque
- Coordinates: 39°39′39″N 20°51′16″E

Architecture
- Type: Mosque
- Style: Ottoman
- Founder: Haci Mehmed Pasha
- Completed: 1740

Specifications
- Length: 11.5 m (38 ft)
- Width: 11.5 m (38 ft)
- Interior area: 231 m^{2} (2,490 sq ft)
- Dome: 1
- Minaret: 1 (partially destroyed)
- Minaret height: 20.36 m (66.8 ft)
- Materials: Stone

The Mosque of Kaloutsiani (also known as Xhamia e Kalluçës in Albanian, from Turkish: Kanlı Çeşme Camii, lit. 'Mosque of the Bloody Fountain', rendered in Greek as Τζαμί Καλούτσιανης) is a former mosque in the town of Ioannina, in the Epirus region of northwestern Greece. Completed in 1740 during the Ottoman era, the mosque was abandoned in 1913, and restoration campaigns and works commenced in 2005. It was further renovated in the mid-2020s. It is one of the four surviving mosques in Ioannina, the others being the Veli Pasha Mosque, the Fethiye Mosque and the Aslan Pasha Mosque.

== Etymology ==
The name of the mosque is possibly derived from the Turkish words çeşme, meaning "fountain", and kan, meaning "blood". In 1611, Ioannina and the surrounding region experienced turmoil as a failed Greek revolt led by Dionysios Skylosophos, the former Metropolitan of Larissa, broke out. The movement however gathered little support and was harshly suppressed by the Ottoman Empire, who drove the defeated Greek and Albanian families out of the fortress of Ioannina. The expelled families settled in the area where the current mosque stands now; at the time, it was where the seraglio of the Ottoman dignitary Osman Pasha stood. The district, epicenter of the peasant uprising and southwestern gateway to the city, was dubbed "Bloody Fountain" by the populace, a name that is also mentioned by the Ottoman traveler Evliya Çelebi in the middle of the seventeenth century, when he visited Ioannina.

Another hypothesis for the etymology of the toponym is that is derives from Mehmet Pasha II, the son of Haci Mehmed Pasha. He was nicknamed “the good pasha” (which in Greek is Καλός Πασάς, kalos passas), and had a fountain erected near the mosque, an act that would give the district the term "good fountain".

The name of the mosque was also rendered as Kalou Tsesme mosque in the Greek language, but it is also known as Haci Mehmed Pasha mosque or even Ahmed Pasha mosque.

== History ==
According to a dedicatory inscription that was found in the building, the Kaloutsiani Mosque was commissioned in 1740 by Haci Mehmed Pasha, former governor of Ioannina, on the site of a previous, small wooden mosque for daily prayer which was probably dated to around the end of the fifteenth century. This original mosque was probably burnt to the ground during the 1611 revolt, and needed to be replaced. During its history, the building of Haci Mehmed Pasha was partially damaged by earthquakes and renovated each time.

Ioannina and the wider region of Epirus became part of modern Greece following the defeat of the Ottoman Empire in the First Balkan War, which cost the Ottomans the majority of their European holdings. After 1913 the mosque became part of the National Bank of Greece's list of tradable goods and it was temporarily used as an intercity bus station. Classified in 1925, the place was sold in 1932 to private individuals who added numerous stalls inside the large portico. Among the several shops that were built in over the decades was the popular coffeehouse "The Mosque" (Καφενείον «Το Τζαμί»). The roof of the minaret was destroyed sometime between 1920 and 1944, probably during the Italian bombardments in 1940 during the Greco-Italian War.

Since 2005, the building belongs to the Greek Ministry of Culture, which aims for the restoration of both the mosque and the Tzavelas Square. A plan then started being implemented, seeking to restoring Kaloutsiani Mosque to its original appearance. Renovation works were completed in July 2026, and the restored mosque was inaugurated by Lina Mendoni, Greek Minister of Culture.

== Architecture ==
The mosque has an area of 231 square metres (2,490 sq ft), with a square prayer room that measures 11.5 metres (38 ft) on the outside. The structure is made up of two slightly projecting levels separated by a cornice, the whole being surmounted by a dome whose octagonal dome that rests on top of four squinches. A colonnaded portico, which has been blocked out ever since the ground floor has been used as shops, is found in the north and east facades. The open space between the ten columns once sported wooden crosspieces intended to support the structure in case an earthquake hit the town.

Initially, the south and west façades of the mosque had each two rows of two windows, however the lower openings were replaced by doors in the twentieth century. The dome and the roof of the portico are covered with slates. Four angular flying buttresses connect the drum to the square base of the structure.

Despite its recent usage as a shopping area, the building retains a rich painted decoration of Arabic inscriptions on the dome interior, a wooden and green plaster mihrab, part of the pyramid-shaped minbar and a 20.36-metre-high (66.8 ft) minaret (whose roof is not preserved) in its northwest corner. Inside, on the north side, there is also an elevated gallery of carved wood.

== See also ==
- Islam in Greece
- Ottoman Greece
- List of former mosques in Greece

== Bibliography ==
- Mikropoulos, Anastasios (2008). Elevating and safeguarding culture using tools of the information society: dusty traces of the muslim culture. Earthlab. ISBN 978-960-233-187-3.
- Plagou, Angeliki (2016). Περιφέρεια Ηπείρου: Περιφερειακή Ενότητα Ιωαννίνων: Όπου η Ομορφιά Περισσεύει [Epirus Region: Ioannina Regional Unit: Where Beauty Abounds] (in Greek). London: AKAKIA Publications. ISBN 978-1-911352-35-8.
- Prountzos, Athanasios (2004). Ο Προσανατολισμός των μουσουλμανικών Τεμενών Καλούτσιανης και Βελή Πασά στα Ιωάννινα [The Orientation of the Muslim Mosques of Kaloútsiani and Veli Pasha at Ioannina] (in Greek). Athens: National Technical University of Athens.
- Pyrsinellas, Vasileios (1959). Ιστορία της πόλεως των Ιωαννίνων [The History of the Town of Ioannina]. Ηπειρωτική Εστία (in Greek). 8: 762–763.
- Smyris, Georgios (2000). Τα μουσουλμανικά τζαμιά των Ιωαννίνων και η πολεοδομία της Οθωμανικής Πόλης [The Muslim Mosques of Ioannina and the Urban Planning of the Ottoman Town]. Ηπειρωτικά Χρονικά (in Greek). 34: 9–90. ISSN 1108-4758.
- Smyris, Georgios (2009). "Kalou Çeşme Mosque". In Ersi Brouskari (ed.). Ottoman Architecture in Greece. Translated by Elizabeth Key Fowden. Athens: Ministry of Culture and Sports. p. 173. ISBN 9789602147931.
- Tassi, Konstantina (2017). Οι Μουσουλμάνοι των Ιωαννίνων: από την Αυτοκρατορία στο Έθνος κράτος 1913-1923 [The Muslims of Ioannina: from the Empire to the Nation-state (1913-1923)] (in Greek). University of Ioannina.
