= Epirus revolt of 1611 =

Anti-Ottoman rebellion

The uprising in Epirus of 1611, also known as uprising of Dionysios Skylosophos, was an anti-Ottoman rebellion by Albanian and Greek peasants, organized and led by the former Greek Orthodox bishop Dionysios. The peasants and shepherds who rebelled, attacked the city of Ioannina, the seat of the Ottoman governor of the region, on September 10, 1611. The following day the uprising was brutally suppressed by the Ottoman authorities with support from the local Greek Orthodox notables and the ringleaders were executed. As a result of the revolt the privileges which the native inhabitants of Ioannina enjoyed since the beginning of Ottoman rule (1430) were annulled.

== Background ==
The rebellion led by Dionysios is part of the local uprisings in the early 17th century in different part of the Balkans including Albania and Epirus which combined anti-taxation demands and anti-Ottoman sentiments. An anti-taxation uprising had occurred in the region just five years before 1611 in the region of Kurvelesh. These 17th century uprisings were often instigated by pro-western figures and as such had a more limited scope than those of the 16th century which purely relied on the economic and social demands of a popular base.

After the Ottoman–Venetian peace treaty of 1573, Spain and the Holy Roman Empire fostered various uprisings in the Balkans and especially in Epirus with the support of local nobility, scholars, clerics and Greek military figures under their command. On the other hand since 1430 when the administrative center of Ioannina peacefully surrendered to the Ottomans the Greek population of the city lived in relative harmony with the Ottoman newcomers. As such 25 Christian churches and 7 monasteries were located inside its walls while on the other hand mosques were erected only outside the walls. Nevertheless part of the population including some the local clergy of Ioannina was involved in preparations of rebellious activities against the Ottoman authorities.

Internal problems and prolonged wars by the Ottoman Empire raised the expectations of Greek subjects to end Ottoman rule; as such a rebellion broke out in Himara at 1596 under metropolitan bishop Athanasios of Ohrid, while at 1600 a delegation from central Greece on behalf of Dionysios arrived in Madrid to propose a major revolt. The later had already incited a failed rebellion in Thessaly in 1600. In 1601, the Ecumenical Patriarchate of Constantinople deposed him for "plotting with madness the uprising against the rule of the lifelong sovereign Sultan Mehmet III". The conspirators who cooperated with Dionysios also maintained contact with Michael the Brave of Wallachia and possible offered financial support for his campaign against the Ottoman Empire.

== Planning ==
In the following years Dionysios traveled to Spain to seek for western support for his plans. There he proposed a plan for the liberation of Epirus, Macedonia, Thessaly and all of "Greece". He was the head of a delegation of various notables and metropolitan bishops from Ioannina, Arta and Larissa and the wider region. According to the plan proposed the uprising would begin with the capture of Preveza by a Greeks force that will hand it over to a Spanish fleet.

In 1603 just before he traveled to Spain, he abandoned Greek Orthodoxy, pledged his allegiance to Pope Clement VIII and received communion with the Roman Catholic Church. In response, Greek clerics of the era frequently attacked and called him an apostate. In this circumstances, Greek clerics in Epirus gave him the sobriquet "Dionysios the Demon" and later Skylosophos (Σκυλόσοφος Dog-philosopher in Greek). His most fierce opponent who violently attacked his memory after his execution was Maximos, a Greek hieromonk from the Peloponnese, who happened to witness the events of 1611 in Ioannina, wrote a "stigmatizing address" (Λόγος Στηλιτευτικὸς) and a number of letters to fellow Greek clerics in Epirus. He emerged openly as a sworn clerical opponent of the rebellious bishop Dionysios whom he clearly identified as an enemy of the Church and the Greek-speaking Orthodox Christians.

After his journey to Spain, Dionysios received promises of support from the Spaniards of the Kingdom of Naples and begun preparations for another uprising in the Sanjak of Ioannina. As such he moved at 1604 in the village of Hoika, near Paramythia. Dionysios also managed to gain the support of various nobles of the area, such as Mattheos, the metropolitan bishop of Dryinopolis, the Christian Deli Giorgos, secretary of an Ottoman official, Lambro, who despite being personal secretary of the Pasha of Ioannina, was deemed by the Albanians as their King, and Zotos Tsiripos.

== Outbreak ==
Most of the details of the insurrection have come from Maximos, Dionysios' adversary. The rebellion broke out in the coastal region of Epirus, Thesprotia. On September 10, 1611, 700-800 peasants and shepherds from 70 villages were gathered in the coastal region and were ready to revolt under the guidance of the metropolitan bishops of Larissa, of Nafpaktos and of Arta. However the vast majority of them had only access to peasant tools with 40 of them bearing arquebuses and additional 100 yatagans. The peasants were expressing their indignation not only against the Ottoman taxation system, but also against Ottoman rule and presence in the region in general shouting slogans and chanting Kyrie Eleison (Greek: Κύριε Ελέησον Lord have mercy) and anti-Haraç taxation slogans (Greek: Χαράτσι χαρατσόπουλο αναζούλι αναζουλόπουλο) in Greek. In Venetian archival sources they are described as Albanians (questi Albanesi sollevati) which covered the events. They are also described as drunken followers of Dionysios. The ca. 1000 Albanian peasants who participated in the rebellion came from 70 villages of the Paramythia region. In the previous centuries they must have been part of the Albanian semi-nomadic pastoralists who roamed freely the grazing pastures of the area, but in the early Ottoman era were forced to settle down permanently and be taxed as peasant farmers. They violently attacked the Muslim beys of the villages Tourkogranitsa and Zaravousa, in Thesprotia.

A list of the settlements that participated in the movement of Dionysios can't be provided with certainty. As such it is uncertain if the population of Dropull and Lunxheri joined the uprising.

The rebels marched towards Ioannina, the administrative center of the region. There they arrived on the night of September 10–11 and burnt down the house of the local Ottoman lord, Osman Pasha. According to accusations by Maximos, the metropolitan bishop of Dryinopolis, who was at that time in Ioannina serving as a vicar of the old and ailing metropolitan of Ioannina also supported the uprising. Osman Pasha finally managed to escape and the following day the Ottoman garrison of the city reinforced with a small cavalry unit and with the support of local Greek notables defeated and dispersed the poorly organized rebellious elements of Dionysios. The decisive Ottoman response was also supported by the local Jewish community.

== Aftermath ==
Three days later Dionysios was found and arrested by the Ottomans in a nearby cave. During his interrogation he claimed that he aimed at the liberation of the population to put an end to Ottoman tyranny. Dionysios also stated that the King of Spain promised him active support.

The Albanian rebels were massacred and Dionysios was tortured at the central square of Ioannina and he perished upon being flayed alive. His remains were sent to Constantinople together with the heads of the children of the Albanian rebels. Other notables that participated in the movement shared a similar fate. All Greek Orthodox churches inside the Ioannina castle were razed to the ground. The Venetian report which described the aftermath of the events mentions that most of the Albanians who escaped the onslaught remained in active rebellion in the more mountainous areas, straining communication between Epirus and Macedonia. Albanian bands also supposedly wreaked havoc in the Christian settlements of Pogoni allegedly as a reprisal against the movement of Dionysios. Gabriel Malamas, who fought next to Dionysios, managed to escape to Mani, southern Greece.

This also led to the expulsion from the Ioannina Castle of Greeks, who were allowed to live inside the citadel before the rebellion. Only Muslims and Jews were allowed to remain inside the castle of Ioannina, while the churches there were confiscated and turned into mosques. In 1618, the Greek Orthodox cathedral of John the Baptist, patron saint of the city was demolished and the Aslan Pasha Mosque (now the Municipal Ethnographic Museum of Ioannina) was erected on the site. The rebellion indicates some political oscillation in a minor section of the Greek Orthodox clergy, but despite these differences the distinctive features of the Greek Orthodox Church and Greek urban classes involved alignment with the Ottoman Empire and an anti-western attitude. As such the privileges which the native inhabitants of Ioannina enjoyed since the beginning of Ottoman rule (1430) were annulled.

After the failure of the 1611 rebellion the Spanish authorities adopted a policy of prudent containment towards the anti-Turkish impulses of the Greeks. Moreover, the Greek representatives continued to offer information about the situation in the Ottoman Empire.

== In historiography ==
Doja (2022) says that sources which were written and published in the region after the uprising show that a Greek faction of Epirus fought against the rebelling Albanian peasants and supported the local Ottoman elite. According to him this attitude of the Greek urban, merchant and ecclesiastical faction is evident in the treatise of Maximos of the Peloponnese against Dionysios which was written immediately after his execution. In Greek historiography, since the 19th century the events were re-envisaged as part of the Greek nationalist narrative. Additionally he adds that this approach has been criticized for its "reconstruction based on selective uses of Greek sources and serious inaccuracies, and often deliberate interventions, in the Greek publication of contemporaneous Western documentary sources".

Koukoudes (2003) discusses the possibility that Aromanians and non-Aromanians from the regions of Zagori, Malakasii and other regions around Ioannina may have participated in the revolt.

== Commemoration ==
Annual festivities commemorating the uprising of Dionysios take place in the village of Radovizi, east of Ioannina.

== Sources ==
- Doja, Albert (2022). "Ecclesiastical Pressures and Language Politics: The Boundary Work of Albanian Language in the 17th-18th Centuries" (PDF). Nationalities Papers. 50 (4): 742–769. doi:10.1017/nps.2021.55. S2CID 248275762.
- Floristan, Jose (2018). "Un tornadizo judío ante el Santo Oficio: Carlos Mendes / Joseph Ibn Yaʿish (Benax) (1622-1623)" (PDF). EHumanista/Conversos. 6. ISSN 1540-5877.
- Giakoumis, Konstantinos (2002). The monasteries of Jorgucat and Vanishte in Dropull and of Spelaio in Lunxheri as monuments and institutions during the Ottoman period in Albania (16th-19th centuries) (Ph.D). University of Birmingham. Archived from the original on 2020-07-16.
- Hasiotis, Ioannis (2008). Tendiendo Puentes en el Mediterráneo: Estudios Sobre las Relaciones Hispano-Griegas (ss. XV-XIX) (in Spanish). Granada: Centro de Estudios Bizantinos, Neogriegos y Chipriotas, University of Granada. ISBN 978-84-95905-28-4.
- Imízcoz, José Manuel Floristán (2014). ""Bizancio después de Bizancio": la herencia imperial de Constantinopla y la política exterior de los Austrias españoles (1517-1621)". Baetica Renascens, Vol. 2, 2014, ISBN 978-84-942322-5-1, págs. 863-875. Federación Andaluza de Estudios Clásicos: 863–875. ISBN 9788494232268.
- Kontali, Athina (2020). The Participation of the Greek Orthodox Clergy in the Uprising Movements against the Turkish Conquest: 1453-1821. ΕΝΝΟΙΑ. pp. 126–127. doi:10.12681/eadd/26884. hdl:10442/hedi/26884. ISBN 9789606410260.
- Xhufi., Pëllumb (2017). Arbërit e Jonit (eng: The Albanians of the Ionian Sea). Onufri. ISBN 9789928226228.
- Vranousis, L.; Sfyroeras, V. (1997). "From the Turkish Conquest to the Beginning of the Nineteenth Century". Epirus, 4000 Years of Greek History and Civilization. Ekdotike Athenon. ISBN 9789602133712.
- Ψιμούλη, Βάσω Δ. (2006). Σούλι και Σουλιώτες. Ιστορία και Πολιτική (4th ed.). Athens: Βιβλιοπωλείον της Εστίας.
  - Psimuli, Vaso Dh. (2016). Suli dhe suljotët [Souli and the Souliots]. Toena. ISBN 9789928205728.
