= Aslan Pasha Mosque =

Former mosque in Epirus Region, Greece

- τζαμί Ασλάν Πασά
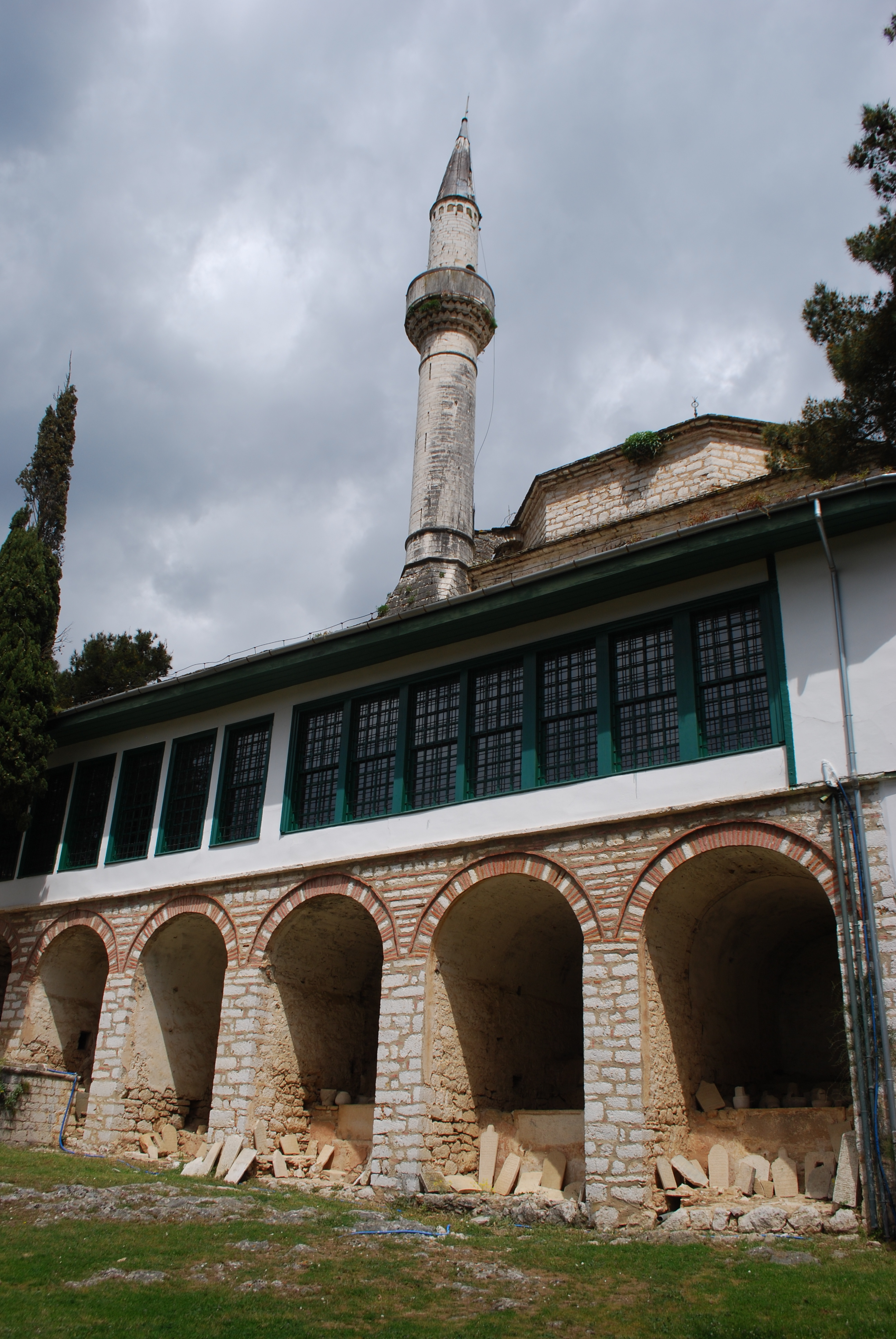

- Location within Greece

Religion
- Affiliation: Islam (former)
- Ecclesiastical or organisational status: Mosque (1618–1920s)
- Status: Abandoned (as a mosque); Repurposed (as a museum)

Location
- Location: Ioannina, Epirus
- Country: Greece
- Interactive map of Aslan Pasha Mosque
- Coordinates: 39°40′25″N 20°51′37″E

Architecture
- Type: Mosque
- Style: Ottoman
- Completed: 1618
- Minaret: 1 (damaged)

The Aslan Pasha Mosque (Greek: Τζαμί Ασλάν Πασά, romanized: Tzamí Aslán Pasá, Albanian: Xhamia e Asllan Pashës) is a former mosque in the city of Ioannina, in the Epirus region of Greece.

== Overview ==
The mosque was built in 1618, during the Ottoman-era, in the city's castle, that replaced the former Church of Saint John, torn down after the failed anti-Ottoman revolt of 1611 led by Dionysius the Philosopher.

The mosque was named after Aslan Pasha (d. 1618), a Janissary of Greek Muslim origin from the village of Monodendri, in the Zagori region of Epirus. He was appointed Ottoman governor of Ioannina and Trikala in the early 1600s, in recognition of his distinguished service in Ottoman campaigns in Hungary during the Long Turkish War of 1593-1606.

The tomb of Aslan Pasha himself lies within the grounds of the mosque. It lies next to the tomb of his wife, a local Greek Orthodox lady from one of Ioannina's elite Greek families, who were said to be the descendants of Byzantine nobility or aristocrats of the Despotate of Epirus.

Since 1933, the building houses the Municipal Ethnographic Museum of Ioannina.

In September 2018, a Mediterranean Sea tropical-like cyclone damaged the minaret on the top of the mosque, and restoration commenced in August 2019.

== See also ==
- Islam in Greece
- List of former mosques in Greece
- Ottoman Greece
