= Veli Pasha Mosque (Ioannina) =

Former mosque in Ioannina, Greece

- Τζαμί του Βελή Πασά
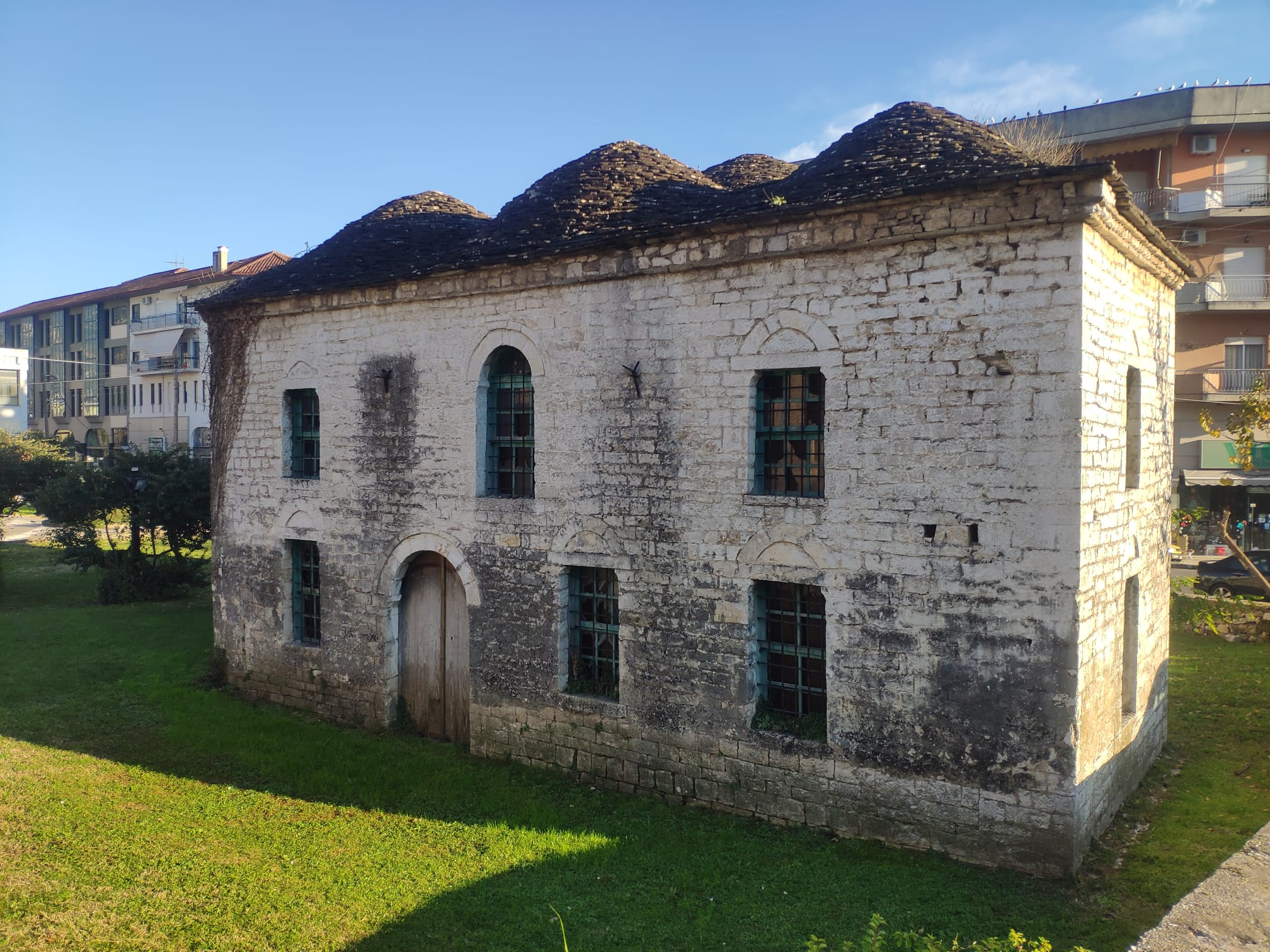
- The former mosque

- Location of the former mosque in Greece

Religion
- Affiliation: Islam (former)
- Ecclesiastical or organisational status: Mosque (17th century–1910s)
- Status: Abandoned (as a mosque); Preserved

Location
- Location: Ioannina, Ioannina region, Epirus
- Country: Greece
- Interactive map of Veli Pasha Mosque
- Coordinates: 39°39′51″N 20°51′19″E

Architecture
- Type: Mosque
- Style: Ottoman
- Completed: c. 17th century

Specifications
- Dome: 1
- Minaret: 1 (destroyed)
- Materials: Stone

The Veli Pasha Mosque (Greek: Τζαμί του Βελή Πασά, Albanian: Xhamia e Veli Pashës, from Turkish: Veli Paşa Camii) is a former mosque located in the town of Ioannina, in the Epirus region of northwest Greece. Built in the 17th century during the Ottoman era, the former mosque was renovated at the turn of the 19th century by Albanian Veli Pasha of Ioannina and formed a complex that comprised a madrasa and kitchens. The former mosque was abandoned in the 1910s, after the First Balkan War. It is one of the four surviving mosques of Ioannina.

== History ==
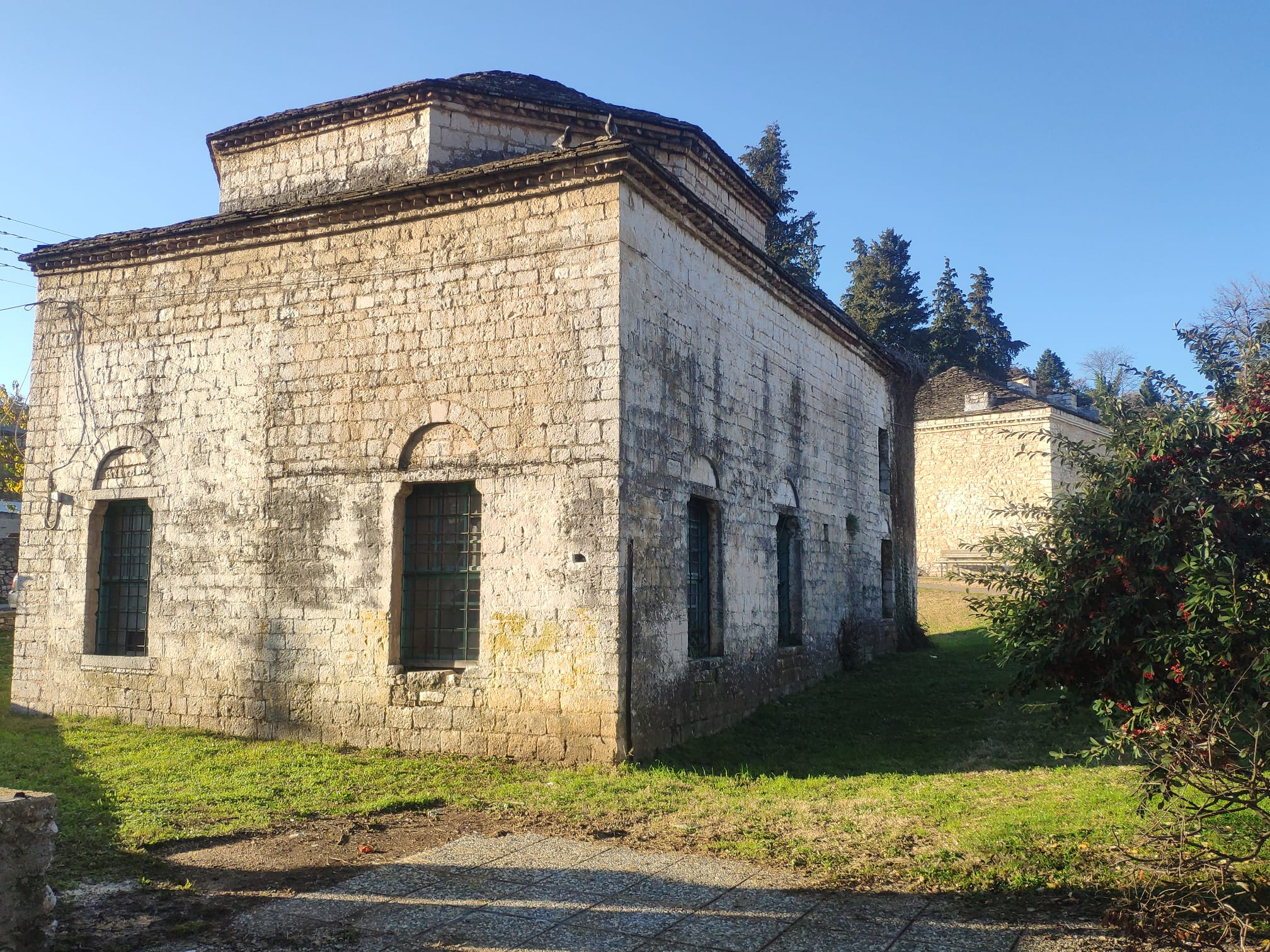
View of the mosque from the southeast, madrassa in the background.

A first small mosque for daily prayer (masjid) was erected on the site of a Byzantine church dedicated to Saint Stephen, to the south-west of the hill of Litharitsia, c.500 metres (1,600 ft) from the Ioannina Castle. The date of construction of this primitive building is uncertain, historians suggest early (slightly after 1617) or late seventeenth century. According to documents from 1670, the mosque then bore the name of its founder, Bali Kethuda. It was subsequently called the “Tsiekour mosque”, in reference to the surrounding district.

Ali Pasha of Ioannina, the semi-autonomous ruler of the Epirus region at the turn of the 19th century, had seraglios built in the area of the mosque for his first two sons, Mukhtar and Veli. The latter, who was notably beylerbey of Rumelia and governor of the Morea, founded a religious institution there in a waqf dating to 1804. A large landowner, he had a new mosque, a madrasa, kitchens and ancillary buildings built, including a library and a khan.

Following the departure of Ottoman power in 1913 after Greece's annexation of Ioannina and the greater region of Epirus in the First Balkan War, the mosque became a barracks and its minaret was destroyed around 1930, before being seized by the Hellenic Ministry of Culture and Sports. The building was returned to the municipality of Ioannina and restored in 1978–1979 and 1983 by the 8th Ephorate of Byzantine Antiquities. The madrasa of the mosque housed the city's Museum of National Resistance, but it was removed in 2021, and when the building was scheduled for restoration under the auspices of the Municipality of Ioannina.

== Architecture ==
The mosque has a prayer hall of 6 by 6.5 metres (20 by 21 ft), surmounted by a dome whose octagonal drum rests on four squinches. To the north there is a porch that was initially open and crowned with three small domes, which was probably walled up after the construction of the building. The minaret, of which only the base remains today, is housed on the western façade between the porch and the prayer room. The masonry is characterized by a pseudo-isodom apparatus in cut stone, while the main dome and the roof of the porch are covered with slates.

Inside, elements of a rich marble mihrab are preserved. The kitchen building and the madrassa remain to the north of the mosque. The old Quranic school houses the National Defense Museum of Ioannina.

== See also ==
- Islam in Greece
- List of former mosques in Greece
- Ottoman Greece

== Bibliography ==
- Demetracopoulou, Polyxena (2009). "Veli Pasha complex". In Brouskari, Ersi (ed.). Ottoman Architecture in Greece. Translated by Elizabeth Key Fowden. Athens: Hellenic Ministry of Culture and Sports. pp. 174–175. ISBN 9789602147931.
- Mikropoulos, Tasos (2008). Elevating and safeguarding culture using tools of the information society: dusty traces of the muslim culture. Earthlab. ISBN 978-960-233-187-3 – via Google Books.
- Neumeier, Emily (2017). "Rivaling Elgin: Ottoman Governors and Architectural Agency in the Morea". In Anderson, Benjamin; Rojas, Felipe (eds.). Antiquarianisms: Contact, Conflict, Comparison. Oxford: Oxbow Books. pp. 134–161. ISBN 978-1-78570-687-5 – via Google Books.
- Plagou, Angeliki (2016). Περιφέρεια Ηπείρου: Περιφερειακή Ενότητα Ιωαννίνων: Όπου η Ομορφιά Περισσεύει [Epirus Region: Ioannina Regional Unit: Where Beauty Abounds] (in Greek). London: AKAKIA Publications. ISBN 978-1-911352-35-8 – via Google Books.
- Prountzos, Athanasios (2004). Ο Προσανατολισμός των μουσουλμανικών Τεμενών Καλούτσιανης και Βελή Πασά στα Ιωάννινα [The Orientation of the Muslim Mosques Kaloutsiani and Veli Pasha at Ioannina] (in Greek). Athens: National Technical University of Athens.
- Pyrsinellas, Vasileios (1959). Ιστορία της πόλεως των Ιωαννίνων [History of the Town of Ioannina]. Ηπειρωτική Εστία (in Greek). 8: 762–763.
- Smyris, Georgios (2000). Τα μουσουλμανικά τζαμιά των Ιωαννίνων και η πολεοδομία της Οθωμανικής Πόλης [The Muslim Mosques of Ioannina and the Urban Plan of the Ottoman Town]. Ηπειρωτικά Χρονικά (in Greek). 34: 9–90. ISSN 1108-4758 – via academia.edu.
- Tassi, Konstantina (2017). Οι Μουσουλμάνοι των Ιωαννίνων: από την Αυτοκρατορία στο Έθνος κράτος 1913-1923 [The Muslims of Ioannina: from the Empire to the Nation-state (1913-1923)] (in Greek). University of Ioannina – via academia.edu.
- Vrakas, Fotis (2007). Η Ήπειρος του χτες – Η Ήπειρος της οθωμανικής περιόδου 15ος - 20ος [Epirus of the Past — Epirus of the Ottoman period 15th-20st centuries] (in Greek) – via academia.edu.
