= Dionysios Skylosophos =

Greek bishop and revolutionary

Dionysios Philosophos (Διονύσιος ο Φιλόσοφος, Dionysios the Philosopher) or Skylosophos (Greek: Διονύσιος ο Σκυλόσοφος; c. 1541–1611), "the Dog-Philosopher" or "Dogwise" ("skylosophist"), as called by his rivals, was a Greek bishop, who led two farmer revolts against the Ottoman Empire, in Thessaly (1600) and Ioannina (1611), with Spanish aid. He is considered one of the most important bishops of the Greek Orthodox Church who acted conspiratorially and revolutionary against the Ottomans during the Ottoman rule in Greece.

== Early life ==
Dionysius was born in 1541 in Aydonat in the Rumelia Eyalet of the Ottoman Empire (modern Paramythia, Thesprotia, Greece). He was of Greek descent from the region of Epirus. At a very young age, Dionysius became a monk at Dichouni in the Ioannina region.

At age 15, he went to Padua where he studied medicine, philosophy, philology, logic, astronomy, and poetry. He took the name "Philosophos" (philosopher).

In 1582, he lived in Constantinople and in 1592 he was elected metropolitan bishop of Larissa and Trikala.

Due to his astrology, fortune-telling activities and contacts with demons he was deposed by the Patriarchate of Constantinople.

== Rebellions ==
In Trikala, Dionysius began organizing an uprising, considering the area suitable for this purpose because it bordered the inaccessible hideouts of the Pindus and the Agrafa mountains. In December 1598, he sent a monk to the Greek community of Venice, in order to ask it to intercede with the emperor of the Holy Roman Empire, Rudolf II, the king of Spain, Philip III, and the Pope, Clement VIII. The Greeks of Venice responded positively, submitting a memorandum to Rudolf's court in Vienna, on behalf of the inhabitants of Epirus, Thessaly, and Macedonia, requesting that troops, weapons, and supplies for 40,000 men be sent to Dionysius and the metropolitan of Nafpaktos and Arta, and that the emperor intercede with the Pope and Spain. Dionysius made one more attempt to contact the Pope in May 1600. The text of the letter to the Pope, written in Greek, was influenced by Rudolf II's successes against the Turks and the exploits of Michael the Brave. It states, among other things:

... the people of Christ, those of Thessaly, Epirus, and Macedonia, are eager for this; and thereafter all Greece as well, and they will endure ten thousand deaths for the faith ... The crowd of infidels is small and very weak, for many reasons and because of these glorious trophies of both the emperor himself and the warrior Michael; the road is therefore quite ready; deliver us from the hand of the cruel tyrant ...

In addition to these contacts, Dionysius began withholding the contributions paid to the Ecumenical Patriarchate (dosimata) and to the empire (haraç) in order to use them for the coming struggle. Ultimately, he launched the uprising without any substantial foreign assistance, apart perhaps from some vague promise from Venice. This movement may be related to the uprising instigated by the Venetians in Albania in mid-November 1600.

Dionysius led a farmer revolt in 1600 in the region of Agrafa. He was demoted from the rank of metropolitan bishop of Larissa for his public speeches inciting rebellion and for his related fundraising activities. He subsequently left for the Republic of Venice where he raised enough funds to pay for a peasant army and tried to get contact with the Pope.

After returning to Greece, he made his headquarters in the Monastery of St. Demetrius in Dichouni (Greek: Διχούνι) of Thesprotia. As a monk, he toured the surrounding villages, raising an army of about 700 men. Armed with simple weapons, his army succeeded in several surprise attacks against the Ottoman garrisons of the area. Encouraged by these successes, he led his army into Ioannina on 11 September 1611. The inhabitants of the city were so surprised by the sight of the armed men and the fires that they turned against each other in confusion, unaware of the purpose of the fighting. This second revolt by Dionysius in 1611 in Ioannina ended in failure as the Ottoman garrison under Aslan Pasha eventually prevailed.

== Death ==
Dionysius hid in a cave by the lake but was captured. When he was presented to Osman Pasha his famous words were: "I fought in order to free the people from your tortures and your tyranny". Dionysius was tortured and perished upon being flayed alive by the Turks in September 1611. His skin was filled with hay and was paraded around the city, rebuked as the "skylosophos" - rather than "philosophos" (skylos meaning "dog"). The term was possibly coined by one of his main opponents, Maximus the Peloponnesian, another monk, loyal to the Patriarchate and the Ottoman Empire.

The Greek population was removed from those houses inside the castle of Ioannina and lost their privileges. The old church of Saint John the Baptist, guardian of the city, dating to the period of Justinian, was destroyed and its monks were killed. The Aslan Pasha Mosque was erected in its place in 1618 to commemorate the success of Aslan Pasha in quelling the rebellion.

== Sources ==
- Archivum Ottomanicum. Vol. 21–23. Mouton. 2003. pp. 224–225.
- Doja, Albert (2022). "Ecclesiastical Pressures and Language Politics: The Boundary Work of Albanian Language in the 17th-18th Centuries" (PDF). Nationalities Papers. 50 (4): 742–769. doi:10.1017/nps.2021.55. S2CID 248275762.
- M. V. Sakellariou (1997). "The Uprising of Dionysios "Skylosophos"". Epirus, 4000 years of Greek history and civilization. Ekdotikē Athēnōn. pp. 246–. ISBN 978-960-213-371-2.
- von Hammer-Purgstall, Joseph Freiherr (1829). Geschichte des osmanischen Reiches: Bd. 1574-1623. C. A. Hartleben. pp. 442–.
- Sardelēs, Kōstas (2000). "ΔΙΟΝΥΣΙΟΣ Ο «ΣΚΥΛΟΣΟΦΟΣ» (1541-1611)". To synaxari tou genous. Ekdoseis Harmos. ISBN 9789605271589.
- Peter Bartl (1974). Der Westbalkan zwischen spanischer Monarchie und osmanischem Reich: zur Türkenkriegsproblematik an der Wende vom 16. zum 17. In Kommission bei Otto Harrasowitz. ISBN 978-3-447-01553-0.
- Winnifrith, Tom (2002). Badlands, Borderlands: A History of Northern Epirus/Southern Albania. Duckworth. ISBN 978-0-7156-3201-7.
- Ioannis Kaphetzopoulos; Charalambos Flokas; Angeliki Dima-Dimitriou (2000). The struggle for Northern Epirus. Hellenic Army General Staff, Army History Directorate. ISBN 978-960-7897-40-4.
- O Larisses-Trikkes Dinysios II Philosophos o hleuastikos epikletheis "Skylosophos", "Epirotika Chronika". nr. 8, 1933
- “Εthnic and Religious Composition of Ottoman Thesprotia in the 15th to 17th centuries” (with M. Oğuz and F. Yaşar), in : B. Forsén & E. Tikkala (eds.), Thesprotia Expedition II. Environment and Settlement Patterns, Helsinki 2011, 347-389
- L. Vranoussis, Dionysos Skylosophos Revoltes et demarches pour la liberation de la Grice (1598-1611) dans le cadre d'une croisade
- (in Greek) Πατρινέλης Χ., Βακαλόπουλος Α. κ.α. (1974). Ιστορία του Ελληνικού Έθνους. Vol. Ι'. Αθήνα: Εκδοτική Αθηνών.
- (in Greek) Dionysius the Philosopher, Metropolitan of Larissa- Analytical Biography (Ta Nea, 17 August 2000).
- (in Greek) Vrellis, Paul. "Wax Effigy of Dionyisus in the Vrellis Museum". Άλφασταρ Ελλάς Α.Ε. 1998–1999. Retrieved on September 12, 2008. "Γεννήθηκε στα μέρη της Παραμυθιάς και πολύ νέος έγινε καλόγερος στο Διχούνι. Αργότερα σπούδασε στα μεγάλα Ευρωπαϊκά κέντρα της εποχής (Βενετία, Πάδοβα) φιλοσοφία, φιλολογία και ιατρική. Συνέχισε τις σπουδές του στην Κωνσταντινούπολη με λογική, ποίηση, γραμματική και αστρονομία, μέχρι τα 34 χρόνια του. Με τα δύο αγροτικά κινήματα που έκανε - το 1600 και 1611, έδωσε στο ραγιά φως και πίστη για ξεσηκωμό. Τον έπιασαν οι Τούρκοι (με προδοσία), κάτω από το τζαμί του κάστρου των Γιαννίνων και τον έγδαραν ζωντανό - σε ηλικία 70 χρόνων. Προηγουμένως, όταν τον παρουσίασαν στον Οσμάν πασά, είπε άφοβα: "πολέμησα για να ελευθερώσω τον λαό από τα βάσανα και την τυραννία σας". Ένα μέρος της σπηλιάς όπου μαρτύρησε θέλησα ν' αποδώσω. Για την φυσιογνωμία του, μελέτησα μια μικρογραφία χειρόγραφου που βρέθηκε στην μονή Προδρόμου Σερρών, καθώς και πολλές περιγραφές βιογράφων του. Τον απεικονίζω στα 3/4 της πρώτης ώρας από τις 5 ώρες που κράτησε το μαρτύριό του. Δείχνω την προσφορά του αγώνα του προς εμάς, με το ματωμένο δεξί μισάνοιχτο χέρι του. Στο πρόσωπό του έδωσα την έκφραση του πόνου και της καρτερικότητας. Αντίθετα χαρακτήρισα τους δύο δήμιους - έκφραση μίσους και εκδίκησης."
- Kotzageorgis, Phokion. "VI. Ottoman Macedonia (late 14th–late 17th century)"
