= Monodendri =

Monodendri may refer to:

- Monodendri, Ioannina, a village in Zagori, Ioannina regional unit, Greece
- Monodendri, Achaea, part of the municipal unit of Vrachnaiika, Achaea, Greece
- Red Apple Tree, late medieval Greek legend
