= Thessaly rebellion (1600) =

Military conflict

- Part of the Long War
Date	Autumn 1600 – 1601
Location	Thessaly, Ottoman Empire (now Greece)
Result	Ottoman victory

Belligerents
Greeks	Ottoman Empire

Commanders and leaders
Bishop Dionysios	

The Thessaly rebellion was a Greek revolt against the Ottoman Empire in Thessaly (the Sanjak of Tirhala) in 1600–01 led by Bishop Dionysios of Larissa. Educated in Italy, and serving since 1592 as the metropolitan bishop of Larissa (though he was based in Trikala, as Larissa was scarcely Christian), Dionysios had in 1598 sent a monk from Ioannina to the Republic of Venice to urge the Greek community there to request ammunition and arms from Rudolf II, Holy Roman Emperor, Philip III of Spain, and Pope Clement VIII for a Greek rebellion. Orthodox Christian leaders had requested aid from Western powers in the previous years (i.e. in Banat, Himara, and Herzegovina). In 1599 or early 1600, inhabitants of Epirus, Macedonia, and Thessaly assured the Pope through correspondence that they were ready to die for Christianity and asked him to rise against the Ottoman Empire, to save them from 'the relentless tyrant'. Although the mission was deemed a failure, Dionysios was persistent, and began holding on to the poll tax and ecclesiastical revenues which in fact was to be handed over to the Orthodox Patriarchate. Breaking out in the autumn of 1600, the rebellion was quickly suppressed, with harsh reprisal. Laymen and priests were executed, including Bishop Serapheim of Phanari (who was later proclaimed a Neomartyr).

== Sources ==
- Archivum Ottomanicum. Vol. 21–23. Mouton. 2003. pp. 224–225.
- Sakellariou, M. V. (1997). "The Uprising of Dionysios "Skylosophos"". Epirus, 4000 years of Greek history and civilization. Ekdotikē Athēnōn. pp. 246–. ISBN 978-960-213-371-2.
- Bartl, Peter (1974). "Dionysios Skylosophos". Der Westbalkan zwischen spanischer Monarchie und osmanischem Reich: zur Türkenkriegsproblematik an der Wende vom 16. zum 17. In Kommission bei Otto Harrasowitz. pp. 146–149. ISBN 978-3-447-01553-0.
