= Ottoman Greece =

Period of Ottoman rule of Greece

Ottoman rule in Greece Τουρκοκρατία στην Ελλάδα
- 1371–1830
Frankish/Latin Greece; Byzantine Greece	Modern Greece
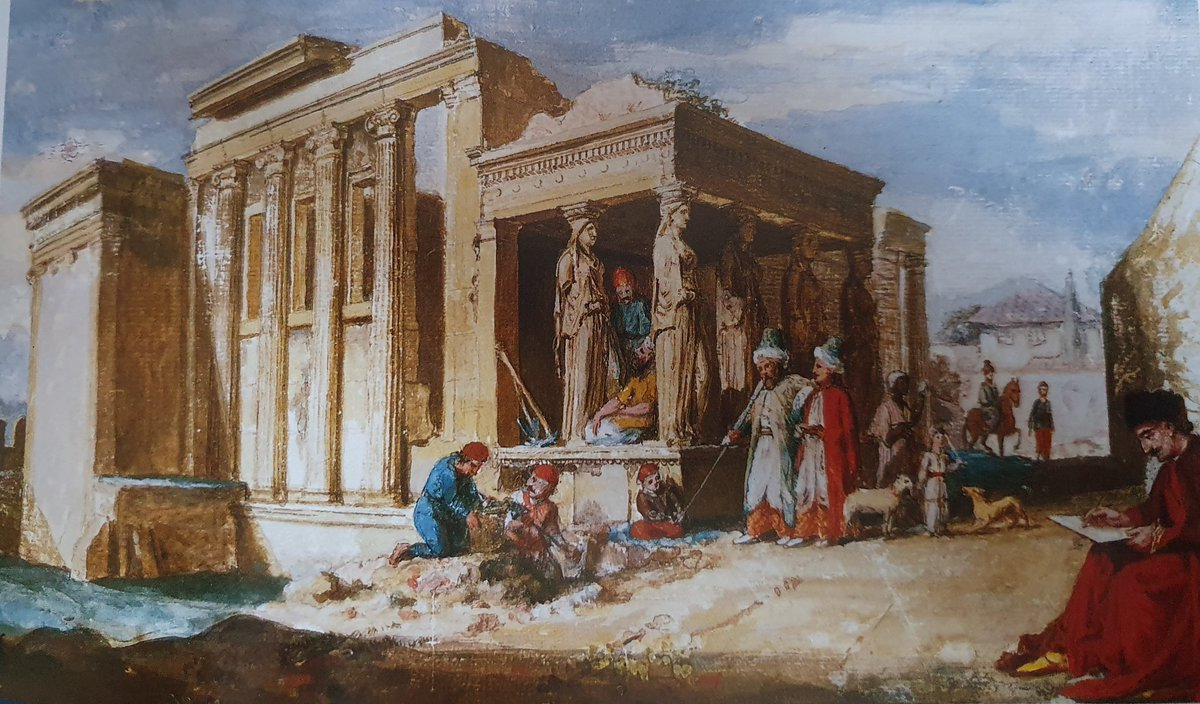
- View of the Caryatid Porch, the Erechtheion, the west end of the Temple of Minerva Polias, and the Pandrosium on the Acropolis in Ottoman Athens in 1750s
- Location: Greece
- Including: Ottoman expansion (Thrace, Thessalonica, Constantinople, Morea, Lesbos); Ottoman–Venetian wars (Cretan War, Morean War, Second Morean War); Orlov revolt; Septinsular Republic; Greek War of Independence; Epirus Revolt; Cretan revolt (1866–1869); Greco-Turkish War; First Balkan War
- Monarchs: Sultans of the Ottoman Empire

The vast majority of the territory of present-day Greece was at some point incorporated within the Ottoman Empire. The period of Ottoman rule in Greece, lasting from the mid-15th century until the successful Greek War of Independence broke out in 1821 and the First Hellenic Republic was proclaimed in 1822, is known in Greece as Turkocracy (Greek: Τουρκοκρατία, romanized: Tourkokratia, lit. 'Turkish rule').

Northern Greece, as well as the northern and eastern Aegean islands and the island of Crete remained in Ottoman control until the late 19th and early 20th centuries. The region of Thessaly joined Greece in 1878–1881 (they were briefly reoccupied by the Ottomans in 1897), while Macedonia (Western, Central and Eastern Macedonia) and Epirus joined Greece in 1912–1913, with the Balkan Wars. Crete became autonomous in 1898 and joined Greece in 1913, with the Balkan Wars. The northern and eastern Aegean islands (with the exception of the Dodecanese Islands) also joined Greece with the Balkan Wars. The present-day Greek portion of Thrace was gained by Bulgaria during the Balkan Wars, but was ceded to Greece in 1919, after World War I. The Dodecanese Islands were ceded by Italy (which occupied the islands during the Italo-Turkish War in 1911–1912) to Greece in 1947, after World War II.

The largest city in Ottoman Greece (as well as in late Byzantine Greece) was Thessaloniki (Ottoman Turkish: سلانیك, Selânik), which was a part of the Ottoman Empire in two periods between 1387–1403 and 1430–1912. When Athens replaced Nafplio as the new capital of the independent Kingdom of Greece in 1834, it was a small town with a population of circa 7,000 inhabitants, compared to the populations of Patras (15,000) and Ottoman Thessaloniki (60,000) in the same year.

Some regions, like the Ionian islands and various temporary Venetian possessions of the Stato da Mar, were not incorporated in the Ottoman Empire. The Mani Peninsula in the Peloponnese was not fully integrated into the Ottoman Empire, but was under Ottoman suzerainty.

The Eastern Roman Empire, which ruled most of the Greek-speaking world for over 1100 years, had been fatally weakened since the Fourth Crusade of 1204. Despite the restoration made in 1261, the Empire never truly recovered, and this paved the way for the Ottomans conquest of Constantinople in 1453, before advanced southwards capturing Athens from its Latin overlord in 1458 and the Peloponnese from the remainder of Roman remnant in 1460. By the middle of 16th century, all of mainland Greece were in Ottoman hands, with only notable exception of port city of Parga that remained under the Venetians. The mountains of Greece remained largely untouched and were a refuge for Greeks who desired to flee Ottoman rule and engage in guerrilla warfare. The Cyclades islands were annexed by the Ottomans in 1579, although they had been under vassal status since the 1530s. Rhodes was conquered in 1522, while the Venetians retained Crete until 1669. The Ionian Islands were never ruled by the Ottomans, with the exception of Kefalonia (from 1479 to 1481 and from 1485 to 1500), but remained under the rule of the Venice. It was in the Ionian Islands that modern Greek statehood was born, with the creation of the Republic of the Seven Islands in 1800.

Ottoman Greece was a multiethnic society, although the Ottoman system of millets did not correspond to the contemporary notion of multiculturalism. The Greeks were given some privileges and freedom, but they also suffered from the malpractices of its administrative personnel over which the central government had only remote and incomplete control. Despite losing their political independence, the Greeks remained dominant in the fields of commerce and business. The consolidation of Ottoman power in the 15th and the 16th centuries rendered the Mediterranean safe for Greek shipping, and Greek shipowners became the empire's maritime carriers and made tremendous profits. After the Ottoman defeat at the Battle of Lepanto, however, Greek ships often became the target of attacks by Catholic (especially Spanish and Maltese) pirates.

The five century period of Ottoman rule had a profound impact in Greek society, as new elites emerged. The Greek land-owning aristocracy that traditionally dominated the Byzantine Empire suffered a tragic fate and was almost completely destroyed. The new leading class in Ottoman Greece were the prokritoi, which were called kocabaşis by the Ottomans. They were essentially bureaucrats and tax collectors and gained a negative reputation for corruption and nepotism. On the other hand, the Phanariots became prominent in the imperial capital of Constantinople as businessmen and diplomats, and the Greek Orthodox Church and the Ecumenical Patriarch rose to great power under the Sultan's protection and gained religious control over the entire Orthodox population of the empire, whether it spoke Greek, Albanian, Romanian, Arabic, Turkic, or Slavic.

== Ottoman expansion ==
After the fall of Constantinople to the Ottomans in 1453, the Despotate of the Morea was the last remnant of the Byzantine Empire to hold out against the Ottomans. However, it fell to the Ottomans in 1460, completing the conquest of mainland Greece.

While most of mainland Greece and the Aegean islands was under Ottoman control by the end of the 15th century, Cyprus and Crete remained Venetian territory and did not fall to the Ottomans until 1571 and 1669 respectively. The only part of the Greek-speaking world that was never under Ottoman rule is the Ionian Islands, which remained Venetian until 1797. France (twice), Russia (with co-rule with Ottoman under limited self-government) and later British ruled the islands until 1862 when the British handed these islands back to independent Greece. Corfu withstood three major sieges in 1537, 1571 and 1716 all of which resulted in the repulsion of the Ottomans.

Other areas that remained part of the Venetian Stato da Màr include Nafplio and Monemvasia until 1540; the Duchy of the Archipelago, centered on the islands of Naxos and Paros, until 1579; Sifnos until 1617; and Tinos until 1715.

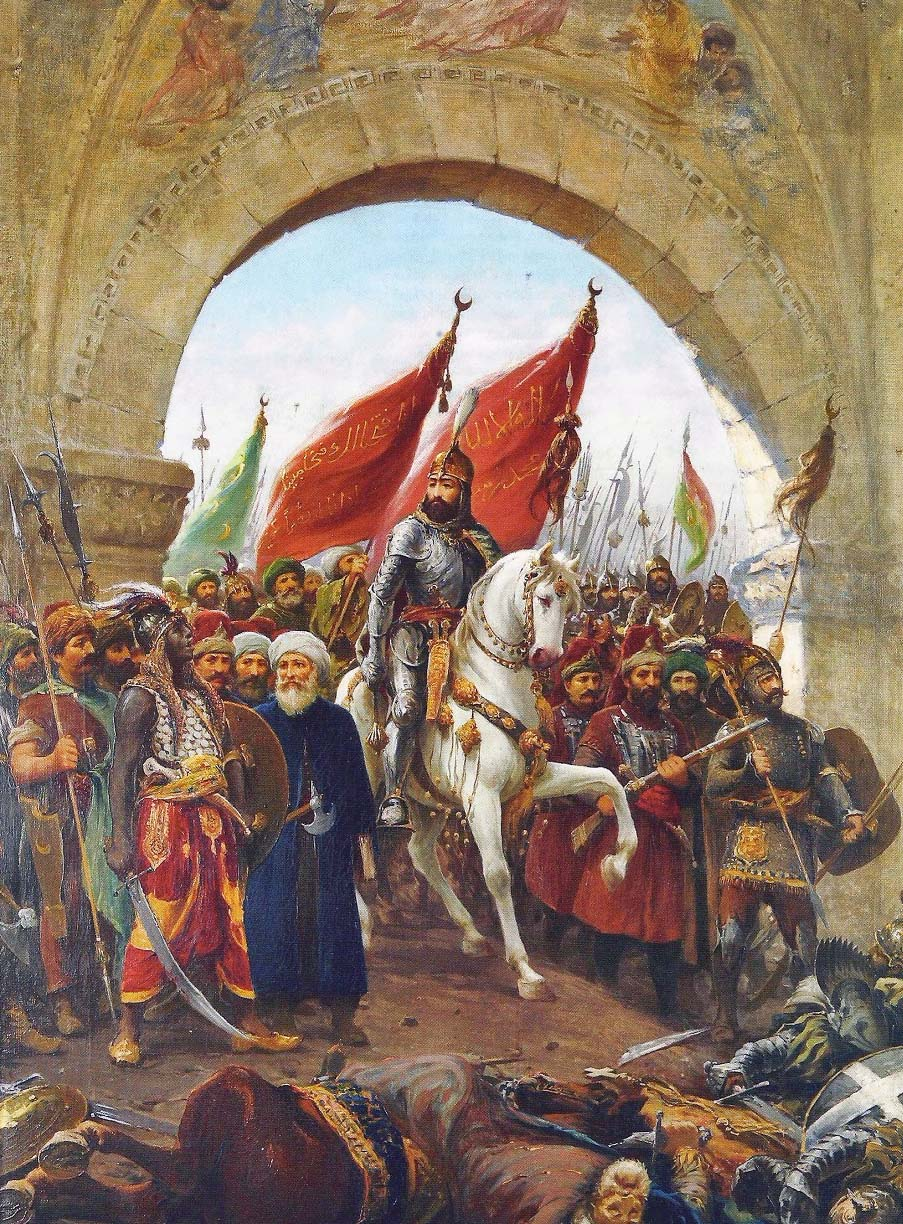
Sultan Mehmed II's entry into Constantinople

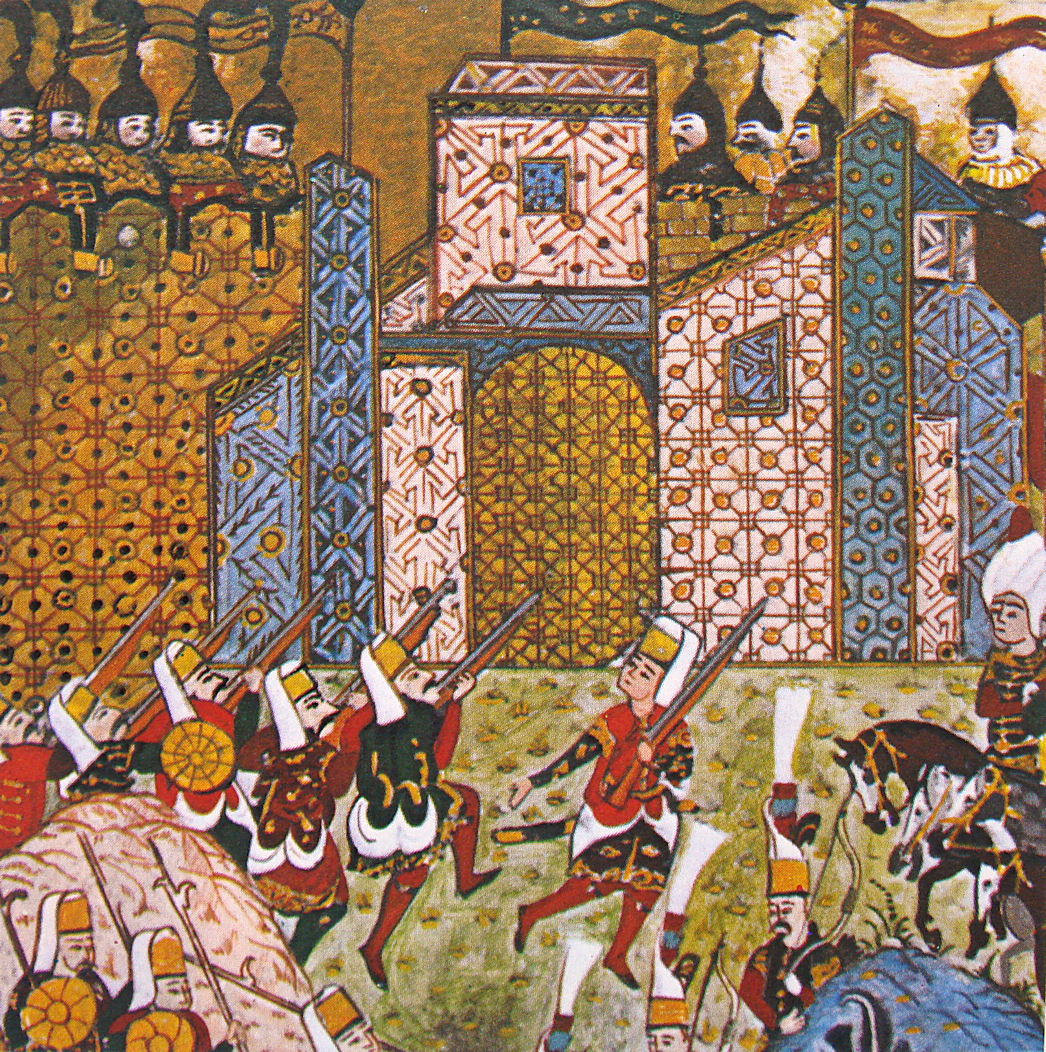
Ottoman Janissaries and defending Knights of Saint John at the Siege of Rhodes (1522)

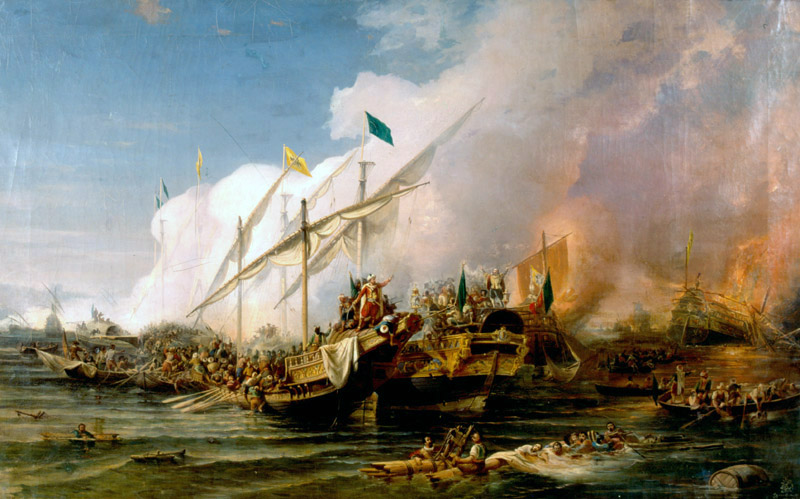
The "Battle of Preveza" (1538) by Ohannes Umed Behzad

The "Battle of Lepanto" (1571) prevented the Ottomans from expanding further

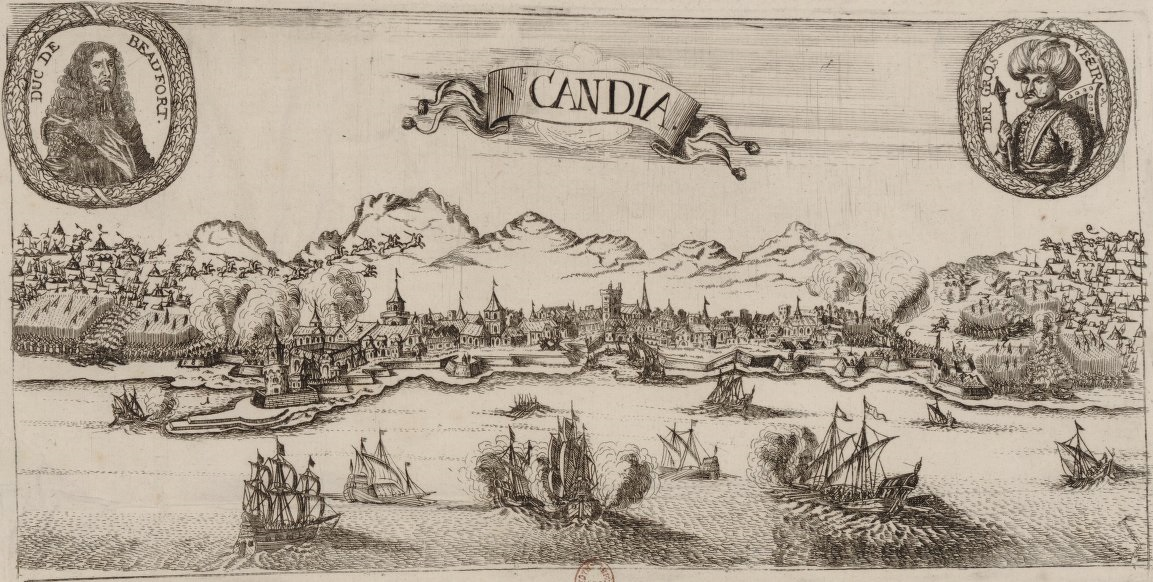
Siege of Candia (1648-1669)

== Ottoman rule ==
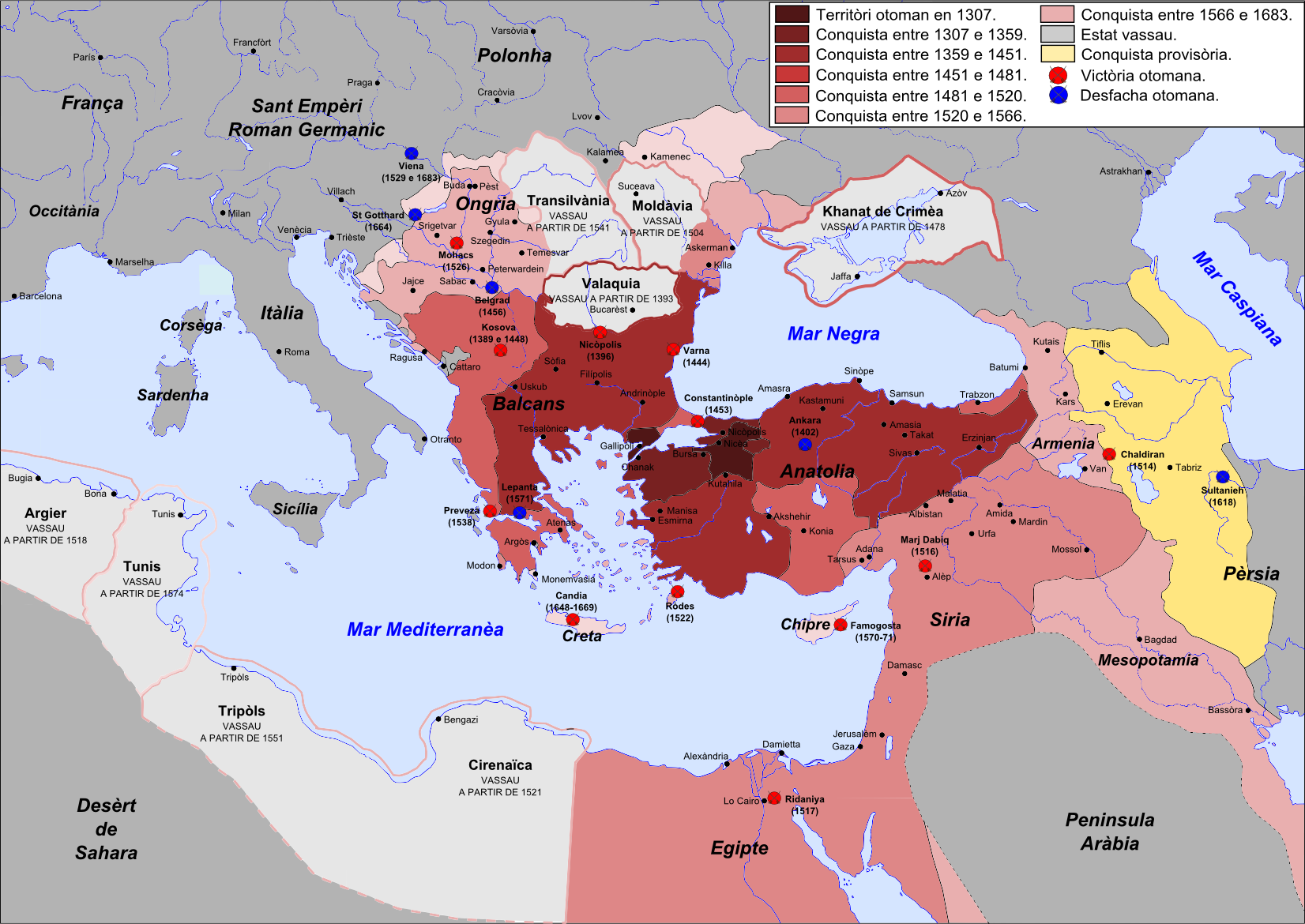
A map of the territorial expansion of the Ottoman Empire from 1307 to 1683.

The consolidation of Ottoman rule was followed by two distinct trends of Greek migration. The first entailed Greek intellectuals, such as Basilios Bessarion, Georgius Plethon Gemistos and Marcos Mousouros, migrating to other parts of Western Europe and influencing the advent of the Renaissance (though the large scale migration of Greeks to other parts of Europe, most notably Italian university cities, began far earlier, following the Crusader capture of Constantinople). This trend had also effect on the creation of the modern Greek diaspora.

The second entailed Greeks leaving the plains of the Greek peninsula and resettling in the mountains, where the rugged landscape made it hard for the Ottomans to establish either military or administrative presence.

=== Administration ===
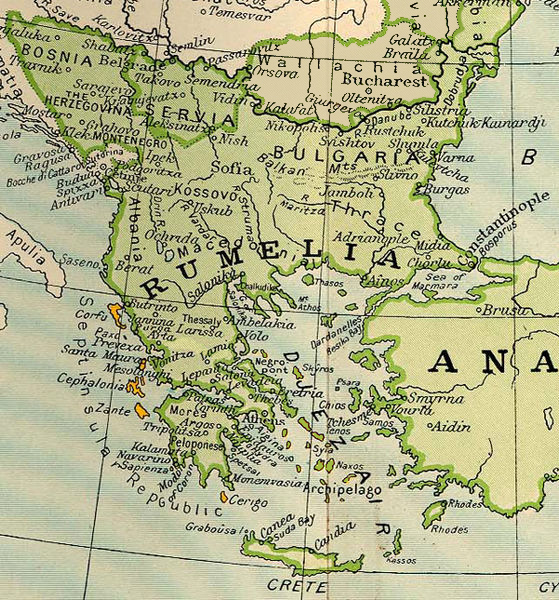
Map of "Rumelia" in 1801. Almost all the Balkan peninsula was called "land of the Romans" by the Ottomans

The Sultan sat at the apex of the government of the Ottoman Empire. Although he had the trappings of an absolute ruler, he was actually bound by tradition and convention. Ottoman rule of the provinces was characterized by two main functions. The local administrators within the provinces were to maintain a military establishment and to collect taxes. The military establishment was feudal in character. The Sultan's cavalry were allotted land, either large allotments or small allotments based on the rank of the individual cavalryman. All non-Muslims were forbidden to ride a horse which made traveling more difficult. The Ottomans divided Greece into six sanjaks, each ruled by a Sanjakbey accountable to the Sultan, who established his capital in Constantinople in 1453.

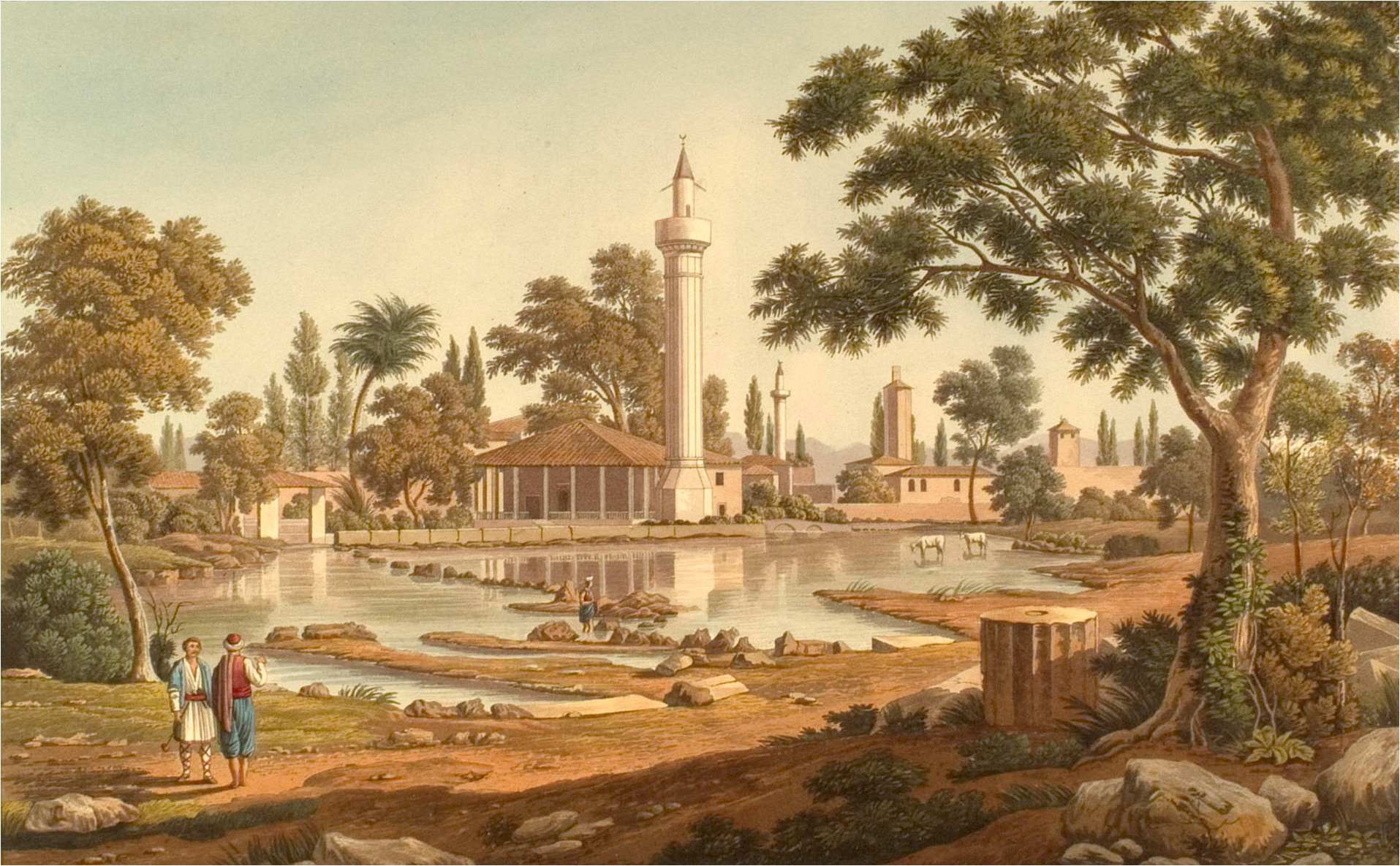
"The Hyperian Fountain at Pherae", Edward Dodwell, 1821.

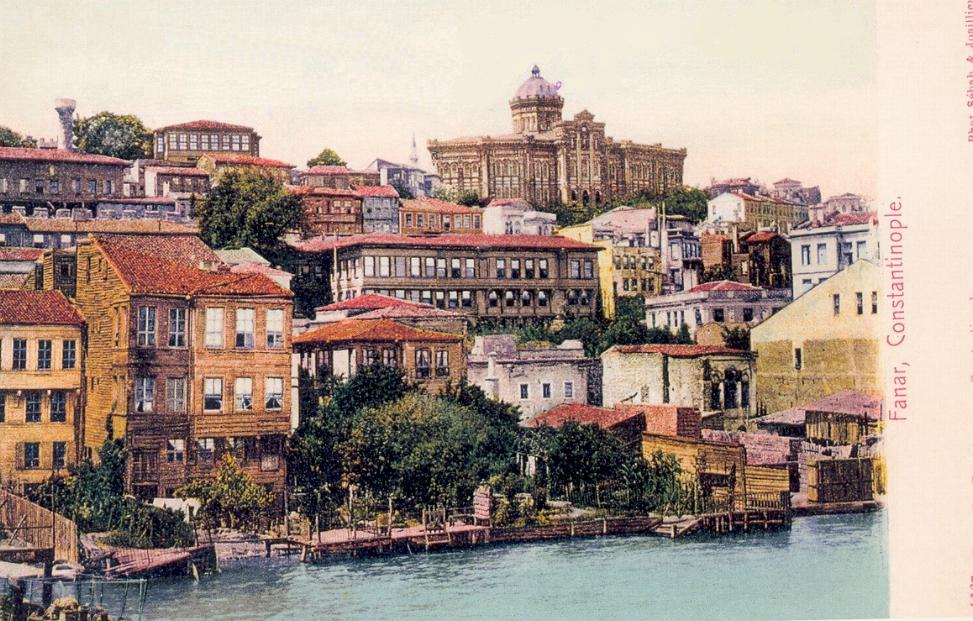
View of the Phanarion quarter, the historical centre of the Greek community of Constantinople in Ottoman times, ca. 20th century. The domed red building on the horizon is the Phanar Greek Orthodox College, which is a landmark of today's Fener quarter.

The conquered land was parceled out to Ottoman warriors, who held it as feudal fiefs (timars and ziamets) directly under the Sultan's authority. This land could not be sold or inherited, but reverted to the Sultan's possession when the fief-holder (timariot) died. During their life-times they served as cavalrymen in the Sultan's army, living well on the proceeds of their estates with the land being tilled largely by peasants. Many Ottoman timariots were descended from the pre-Ottoman Christian nobility, and shifted their allegiance to the Ottomans following the conquest of the Balkans. Conversion to Islam was not a requirement, and as late as the fifteenth century many timariots were known to be Christian, although their numbers gradually decreased over time.

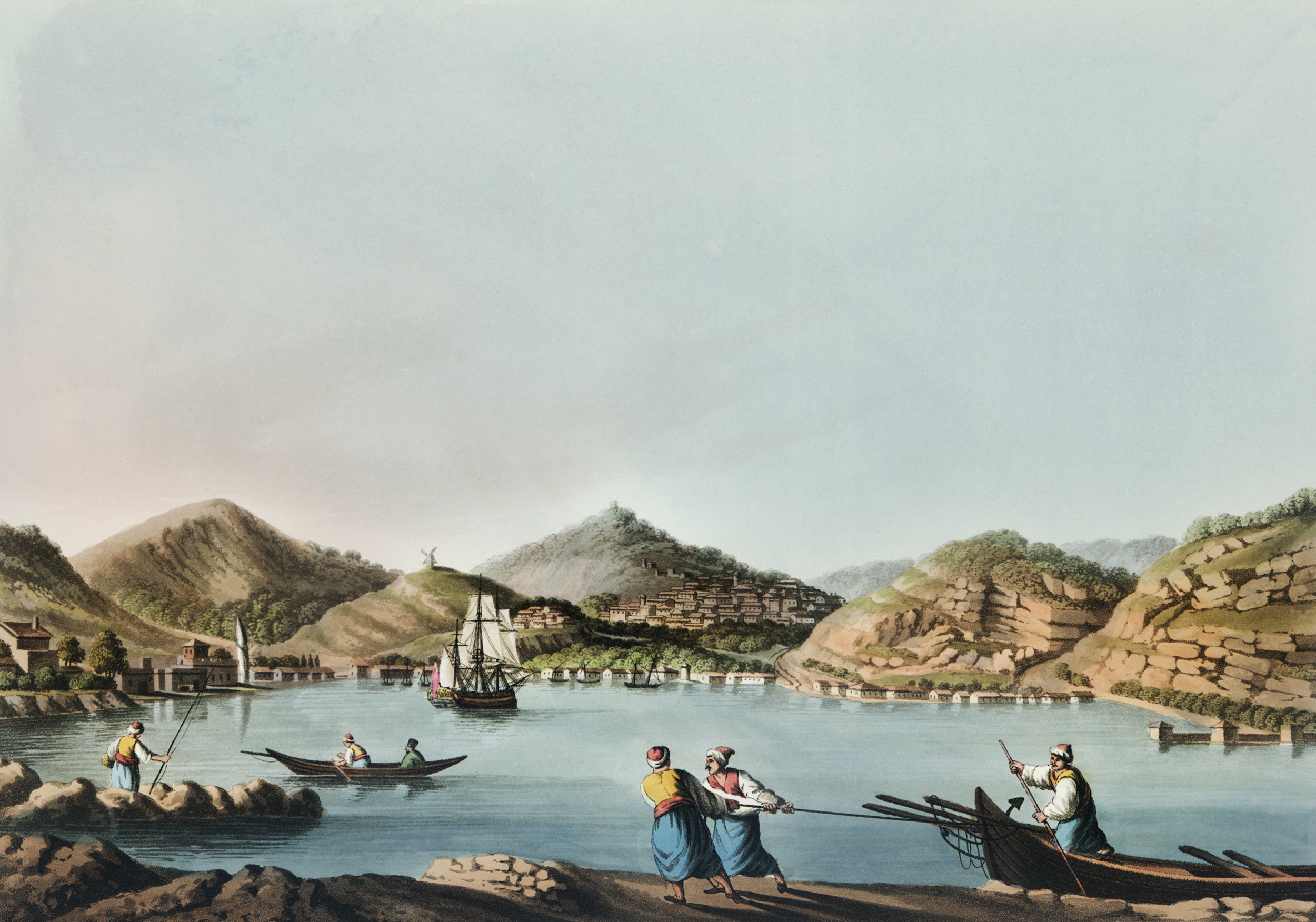
Western harbour of the island of Samos, painted by Luigi Mayer

The Ottomans basically installed this feudal system right over the top of the existing system of peasant tenure. The peasantry remained in possession of their own land and their tenure over their plot of land remained hereditary and inalienable. Nor was any military service ever imposed on the peasant by the Ottoman government. All non-Muslims were in theory forbidden from carrying arms, but this was ignored. Indeed, in regions such as Crete, almost every man carried arms.

Greek Christian families were, however, subject to a system of child conscription known as the devshirme. The Ottomans required that selected male children from Christian peasant villages be conscripted and enrolled in the corps of Janissaries for military training in the Sultan's army. Others were trained as the intelligentsia and imperial administrators. Such recruitment was sporadic, and the proportion of children conscripted varied from region to region. The practice largely came to an end by the middle of the seventeenth century.

Under the Ottoman system of government, Greek society was at the same time fostered and restricted. With one hand the Ottoman regime gave privileges and freedom to its subject people; with the other it imposed a tyranny deriving from the malpractices of its administrative personnel over which it exercised only remote and incomplete control. In fact the "rayahs" were commoners. The term rayah came to denote an underprivileged, tax-ridden and socially inferior population.

=== Religion ===
The Sultan regarded the Ecumenical Patriarch of the Greek Orthodox Church as the leader of all Orthodox, Greeks or not, within the empire. The Patriarch was accountable to the Sultan for the good behavior of the Orthodox population, and in exchange he was given wide powers over the Orthodox communities, including the non-Greek Slavic peoples. The Patriarch controlled the courts and the schools, as well as the Church, throughout the Greek communities of the empire. This made Orthodox priests, together with the local magnates, called Prokritoi or Dimogerontes, the effective rulers of Greek towns and cities. Some Greek towns, such as Athens and Rhodes, retained municipal self-government, while others were put under Ottoman governors. Several areas, such as the Mani Peninsula in the Peloponnese, and parts of Crete (Sfakia) and Epirus, remained virtually independent.

The Patriarchate of Constantinople in general remained loyal to the Ottomans against the western threats (as for example during the Dionysios Skylosophos revolt, etc.) The Orthodox Church assisted greatly in the preservation of the Greek heritage, and adherence to the Greek Orthodox faith became increasingly a mark of Greek nationality.

The emblem of the Ecumenical Patriarchate of Constantinople.

As a rule, the Ottomans did not require the Greeks to become Muslims, although many did so on a superficial level in order to avert the socioeconomic hardships of Ottoman rule or because of the alleged corruption of the Greek clergy. The regions of Greece which had the largest concentrations of Ottoman Greek Muslims were Macedonia, notably the Vallaades, neighboring Epirus, and Crete (see Cretan Muslims). Under the millet logic, Greek Muslims, despite often retaining elements of their Greek culture and language, were classified simply as "Muslim", although most Greek Orthodox Christians deemed them to have "turned-Turk" and therefore saw them as traitors to their original ethno-religious communities.

Some Greeks either became New Martyrs, such as Saint Efraim the Neo-Martyr or Saint Demetrios the Neo-martyr while others became Crypto-Christians (Greek Muslims who were secret practitioners of the Greek Orthodox faith) in order to avoid heavy taxes and at the same time express their identity by maintaining their secret ties to the Greek Orthodox Church. Crypto-Christians officially ran the risk of being killed if they were caught practicing a non-Muslim religion once they converted to Islam. There were also instances of Greeks from theocratic or Byzantine nobility embracing Islam such as John Tzelepes Komnenos and Misac Palaeologos Pasha.

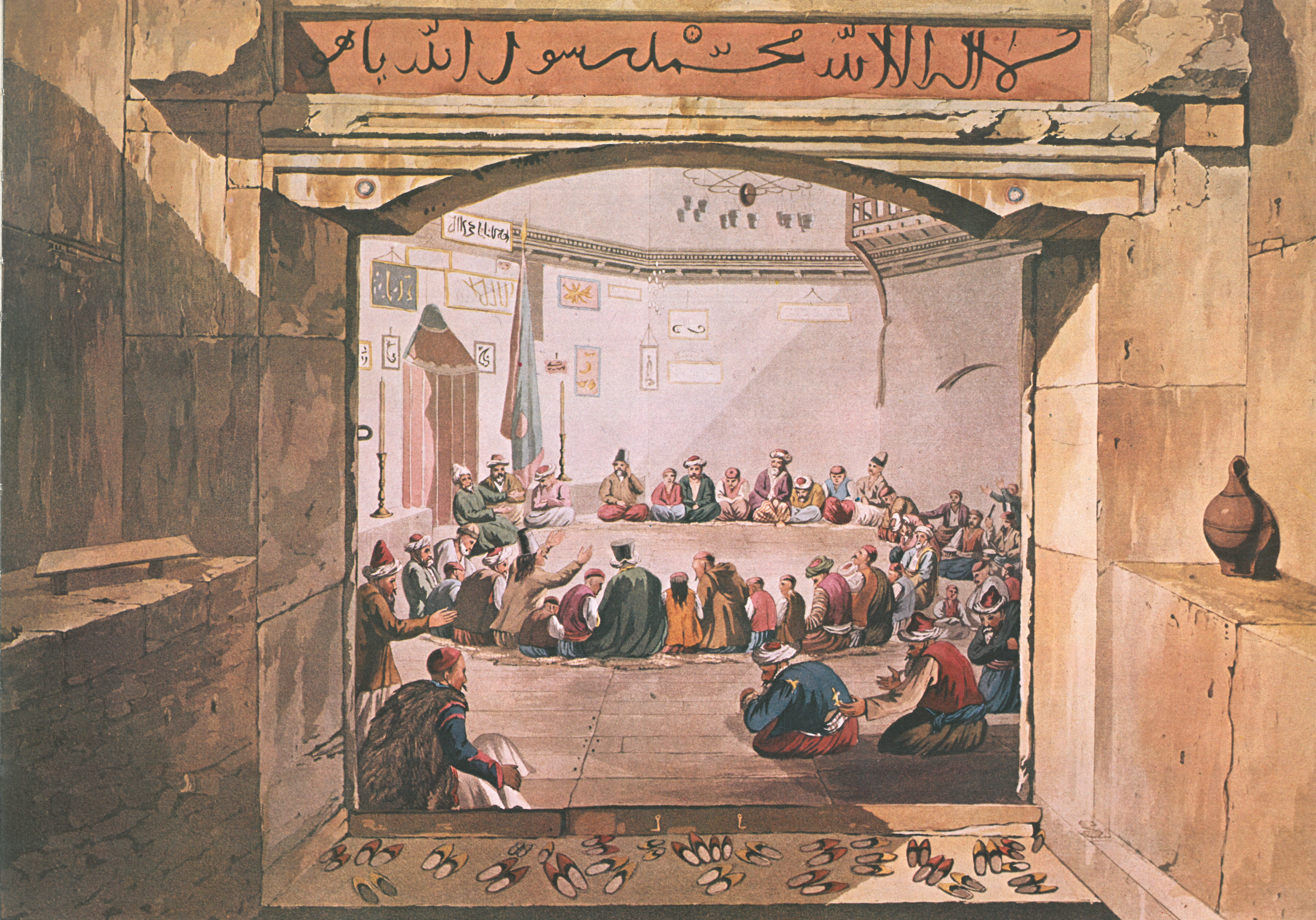
Turkish Kadiri dervishes perform their religious rituals in the Tower of the Winds in Athens, 1805, by Edward Dodwell

Treatment of Christian subjects varied greatly under the rule of the Ottoman Sultans. Bayezid I, according to a Byzantine historian, freely admitted Christians into his society while trying to grow his empire, in the early Ottoman period. Later, although the Turkish ruler attempted to pacify the local population with a restoration of peacetime rule of law, the Christian population also became subject to special taxes and the tribute of Christian children to the Ottoman state to feed the ranks of the Janissary corps. Violent persecutions of Christians did nevertheless take place under the reign of Selim I (1512-1520), known as Selim the Grim, who attempted to stamp out Christianity from the Ottoman Empire. Selim ordered the confiscation of all Christian churches, and while this order was later rescinded, Christians were heavily persecuted during his era.

=== Taxation and the "tribute of children" ===
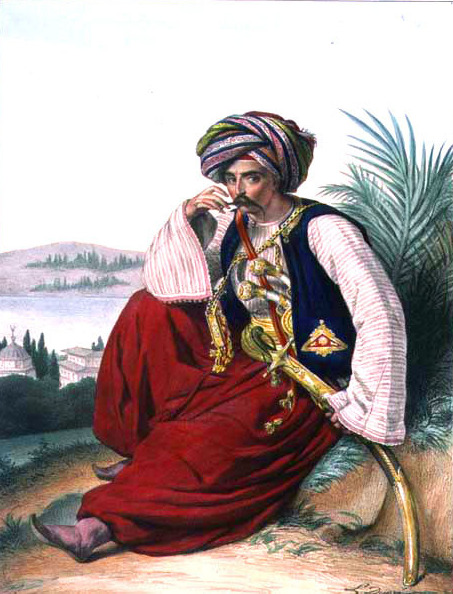
A Muslim Greek Mamluk portrayed by Louis Dupré (oil on canvas, 1825)

Greeks paid a land tax and a heavy tax on trade, the latter taking advantage of the wealthy Greeks to fill the state coffers. Greeks, like other Christians, were also made to pay the jizya, or Islamic poll-tax which all non-Muslims in the empire were forced to pay instead of the Zakat that Muslims must pay as part of the 5 pillars of Islam. Failure to pay the jizya could result in the pledge of protection of the Christian's life and property becoming void, facing the alternatives of conversion, enslavement, or death.

Like in the rest of the Ottoman Empire, Greeks had to carry a receipt certifying their payment of jizya at all times or be subject to imprisonment. Most Greeks did not have to serve in the Sultan's army, but the young boys that were taken away and converted to Islam were made to serve in the Ottoman military. In addition, girls were taken in order to serve as odalisques in harems.

These practices are called the "blood tax" or the "tribute of children" (devshirmeh) (in Greek παιδομάζωμα paidomazoma, meaning "child gathering"), whereby every Christian community was required to give one son in five, to be raised as a Muslim and enrolled in the corps of Janissaries, elite units of the Ottoman army. There was much resistance to this. Greek folklore tells of mothers crippling their sons to avoid their abduction. Nevertheless, entrance into the corps, accompanied by conversion to Islam, offered the opportunity to advance as high as governor or even Grand Vizier.

Be damned, O Emperor, be thrice damned
For the evil you have done and the evil you do.
You catch and shackle the old and the archpriests
In order to take the children as Janissaries.
Their parents weep and their sisters and brothers too
And I cry until it pains me;
As long as I live I shall cry,
For last year they took my son and this year my brother.

— Anonymous Epirote song protesting the Ottoman practice of devshirmeh,

Opposition of the Greek populace to taxing or paidomazoma resulted in grave consequences. For example, in 1705 an Ottoman official was sent from Naoussa in Macedonia to search and conscript new Janissaries and was killed by Greek rebels who resisted the burden of the devshirmeh. The rebels were subsequently beheaded and their severed heads were displayed in the city of Thessaloniki. In some cases, it was greatly feared as Greek families would often have to relinquish their own sons who would convert and return later as their oppressors. In other cases, the families bribed the officers to ensure that their children got a better life as a government officer.

=== Influence on tradition ===
After the 16th century, many Greek folk songs (dimotika) were produced and inspired from the way of life of the Greek people, brigands and the armed conflicts during the centuries of Ottoman rule. Klephtic songs (Greek: Κλέφτικα τραγούδια), or ballads, are a subgenre of the Greek folk music genre and are thematically oriented on the life of the klephts. Prominent conflicts were immortalised in several folk tales and songs, such as the epic ballad To tragoudi tou Daskalogianni of 1786, about the resistance warfare under Daskalogiannis.

== Emergence of Greek nationalism ==
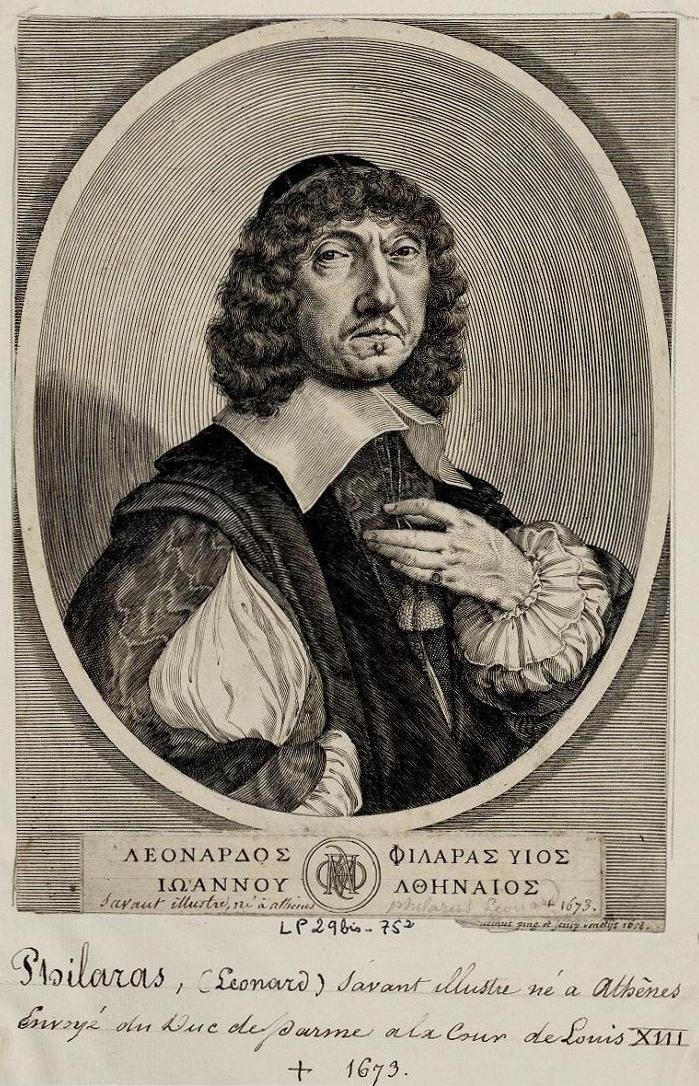
Leonardos Philaras (c. 1595 – 1673) was a Greek scholar born in Athens, and an early supporter of Greek liberation from Ottoman rule, spending much of his career in persuading Western European intellectuals to support Greek Independence.

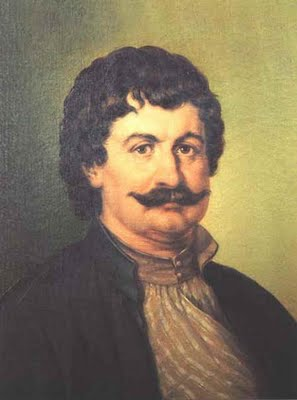
Rigas Feraios, intellectual and forerunner of the Greek War of Independence

Over the course of the eighteenth century Ottoman landholdings, previously fiefs held directly from the Sultan, became hereditary estates (chifliks), which could be sold or bequeathed to heirs. The new class of Ottoman landlords reduced the hitherto free Greek peasants to serfdom, leading to further poverty and depopulation in the plains.

On the other hand, the position of educated and privileged Greeks within the Ottoman Empire improved greatly in the 17th and 18th centuries. From the late 1600s Greeks began to fill some of the highest and most important offices of the Ottoman state. The Phanariotes, a class of wealthy Greeks who lived in the Phanar district of Constantinople, became increasingly powerful. Their travels to Western Europe as merchants or diplomats brought them into contact with ideas of liberalism and nationalism, and it was among the Phanariotes that the modern Greek nationalist movement was born. Many Greek merchants and travelers were influenced by the ideas of the French Revolution and a new Age of Greek Enlightenment was initiated at the beginning of the 19th century in many Ottoman-ruled Greek cities and towns.

Greek nationalism was also stimulated by agents of Catherine the Great, the Orthodox ruler of the Russian Empire, who hoped to acquire Ottoman territory, including Constantinople itself, by inciting a Christian rebellion against the Ottomans. However, during the Russian-Ottoman War which broke out in 1768, the Greeks did not rebel, disillusioning their Russian patrons. The Treaty of Kuchuk-Kainarji (1774) gave Russia the right to make "representations" to the Sultan in defense of his Orthodox subjects, and the Russians began to interfere regularly in the internal affairs of the Ottoman Empire. This, combined with the new ideas let loose by the French Revolution of 1789, began to reconnect the Greeks with the outside world and led to the development of an active nationalist movement, one of the most progressive of the time.

Greece was peripherally involved in the Napoleonic Wars, but one episode had important consequences. When the French under Napoleon Bonaparte seized Venice in 1797, they also acquired the Ionian Islands, thus ending the four hundredth year of Venetian rule over the Ionian Islands. The islands were elevated to the status of a French dependency called the Septinsular Republic, which possessed local autonomy. This was the first time Greeks had governed themselves since the fall of Trebizond in 1461.

Among those who held office in the islands was John Capodistria, destined to become independent Greece's first head of state. By the end of the Napoleonic Wars in 1815, Greece had re-emerged from its centuries of isolation. British and French writers and artists began to visit the country, and wealthy Europeans began to collect Greek antiquities. These "philhellenes" were to play an important role in mobilizing support for Greek independence.

=== Uprisings before 1821 ===
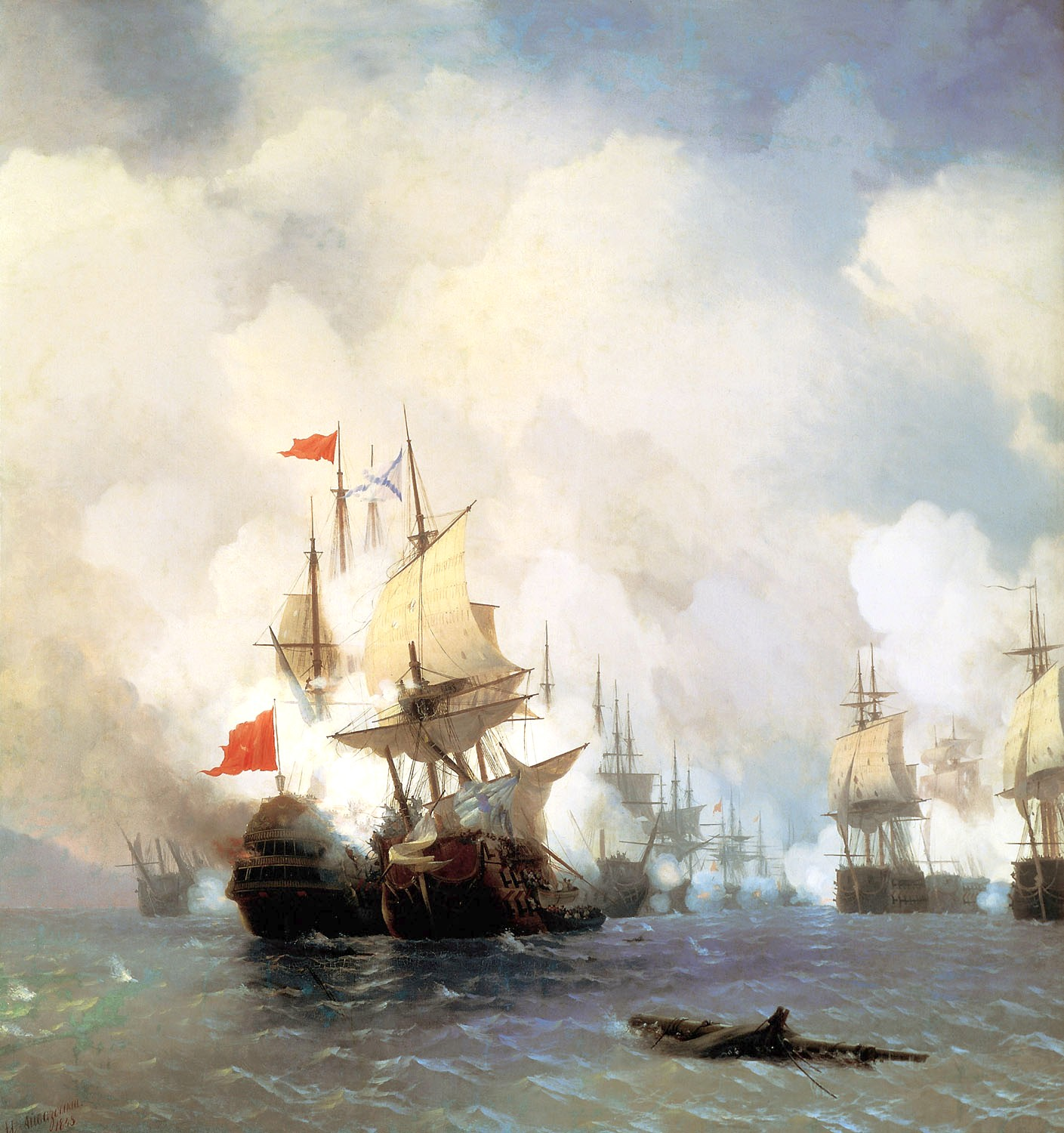
Battle of Chios (Chesma), during the Orlov Revolt, by Ivan Aivazovsky (1848)

Greeks in various places of the Greek peninsula would at times rise up against Ottoman rule, mainly while taking advantage of wars the Ottoman Empire would engage in. Those uprisings were of mixed scale and impact. During the Ottoman–Venetian War (1463–1479), the Maniot Kladas brothers, Krokodelos and Epifani, were leading bands of stratioti on behalf of Venice against the Turks in Southern Peloponnese. They put Vardounia and their lands into Venetian possession, for which Epifani then acted as governor.

Before and after the victory of the Holy League in 1571 at the Battle of Lepanto a series of conflicts broke out in the peninsula such as in Epirus, Phocis (recorded in the Chronicle of Galaxeidi) and the Peloponnese, led by the Melissinos brothers and others. They were crushed by the following year. Short-lived revolts of local level occurred throughout the region such as the ones led by metropolitan bishop Dionysius the Philosopher: the Thessaly rebellion (1600) and in 1611 in Epirus.

During the Cretan War (1645–1669), the Maniots would aid Francesco Morosini and the Venetians in the Peloponnese. Greek irregulars also aided the Venetians through the Morean War in their operations on the Ionian Sea and Peloponnese.

A major uprising during that period was the Orlov Revolt (Greek: Ορλωφικά) which took place during the Russo-Turkish War (1768–1774) and triggered armed unrest in both the Greek mainland and the islands. In 1778, a Greek fleet of seventy vessels assembled by Lambros Katsonis which harassed the Turkish squadrons in the Aegean Sea, captured the island of Kastelorizo and engaged the Turkish fleet in naval battles until 1790.

=== Greek War of Independence ===
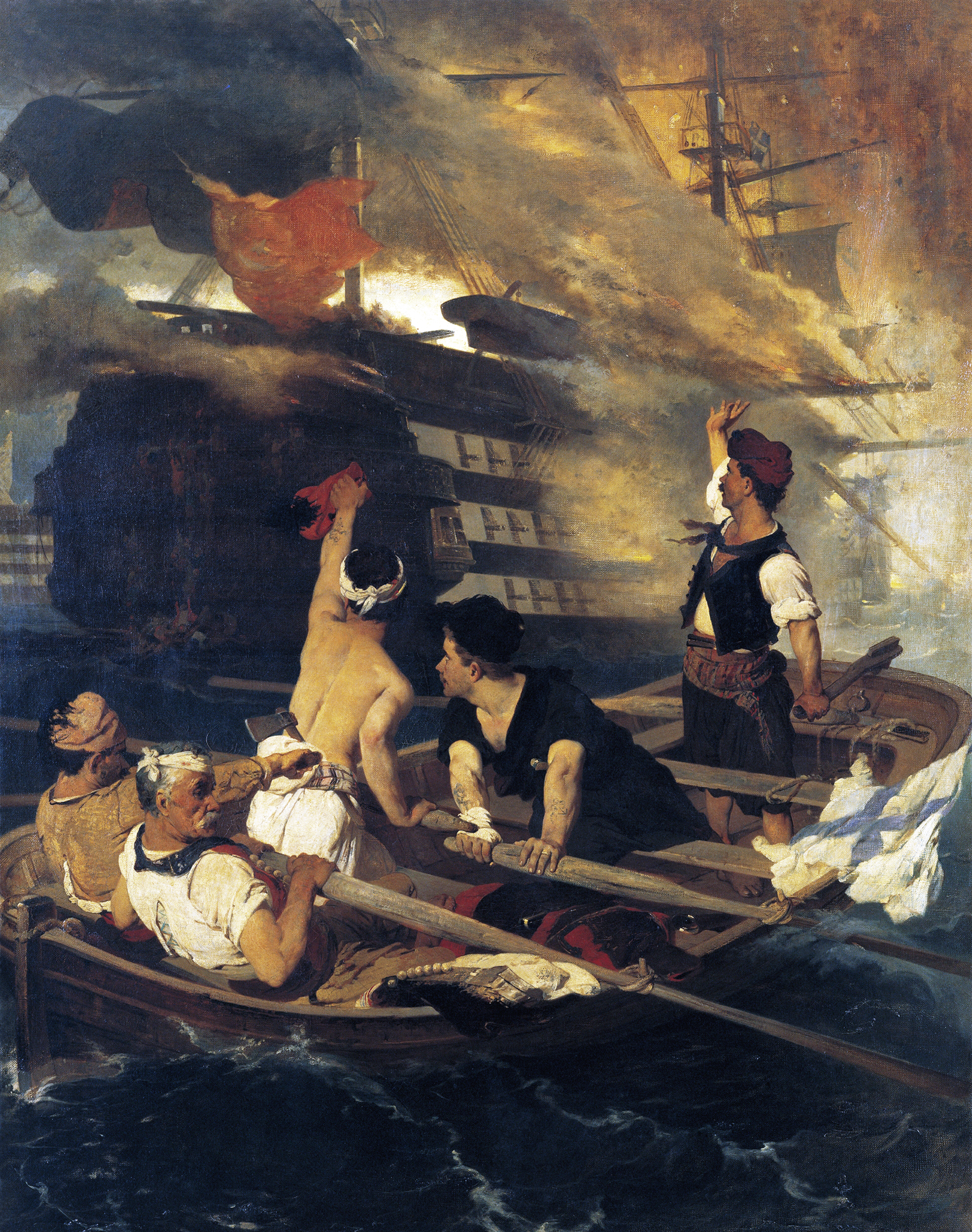
"The destruction of the Ottoman flagship in Chios by Kanaris" by Nikiphoros Lytras.

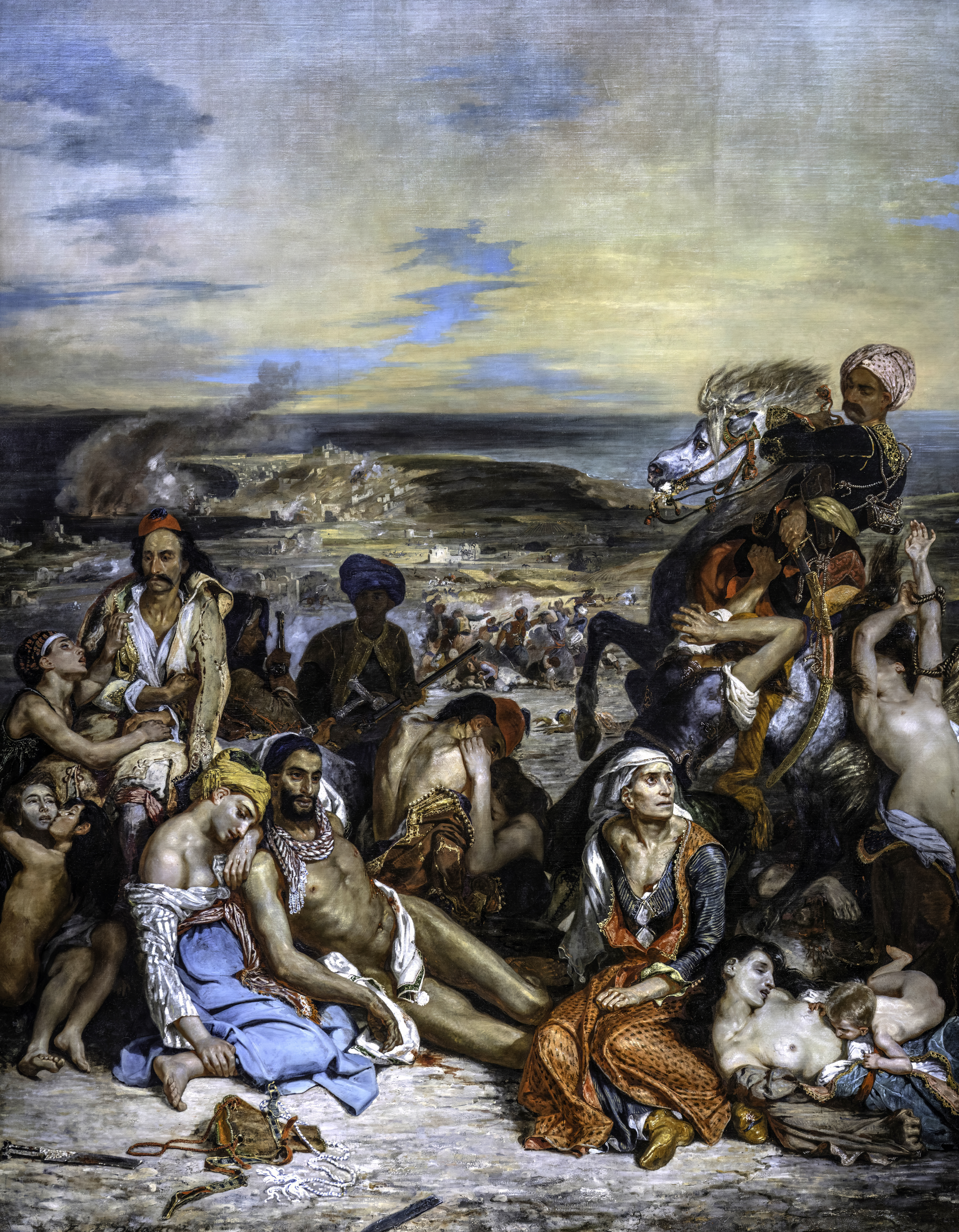
The Massacre at Chios (1824) by Eugène Delacroix.

A secret Greek nationalist organization called the "Friendly Society" or "Company of Friends" (Filiki Eteria) was formed in Odessa in 1814. The members of the organization planned a rebellion with the support of wealthy Greek exile communities in Britain and the United States. They also gained support from sympathizers in Western Europe, as well as covert assistance from Russia. The organization secured Capodistria, who became Russian Foreign Minister after leaving the Ionian Islands, as the leader of the planned revolt. On 25 March (now Greek Independence Day) 1821, the Orthodox Bishop Germanos of Patras proclaimed a national uprising. The Ottomans, in retaliation orchestrated the Constantinople massacre of 1821 and similar pogroms in Smyrna.

Simultaneous risings were planned across Greece, including in Macedonia, Crete, and Cyprus. With the initial advantage of surprise, aided by Ottoman inefficiency and the Ottomans' fight against Ali Pasha of Tepelen, the Greeks succeeded in capturing the Peloponnese and some other areas. Some of the first Greek actions were taken against unarmed Ottoman settlements, with about 40% of Turkish and Albanian Muslim residents of the Peloponnese killed outright, and the rest fleeing the area or being deported.

The Ottomans recovered and retaliated, massacring the Greek population of Chios and other towns. This worked to their disadvantage by provoking further sympathy for the Greeks in Britain and France. The Greeks were unable to establish a strong government in the areas they controlled, and fell to fighting amongst themselves. Inconclusive fighting between Greeks and Ottomans continued until 1825 when the Sultan sent a powerful fleet and army who were mainly Bedouin and some Sudanese from Egypt under Ibrahim Pasha to suppress the revolution, promising to him the rule of Peloponnese, however they were eventually defeated in the Battle of Navarino in 1827.

The atrocities that accompanied this expedition, together with sympathy aroused by the death of the poet and leading philhellene Lord Byron at Messolongi in 1824, eventually led the Great Powers to intervene. In October 1827, the British, French and Russian fleets, on the initiative of local commanders, but with the tacit approval of their governments, destroyed the Ottoman fleet at the Battle of Navarino. This was the decisive moment in the war of independence.

In October 1828, the French landed troops in the Peloponnese to liberate it from Ibrahim's army, while Russia was since April at war against the Ottomans. Under their protection, the Greeks were able to reorganize, form a new government and defeat the Ottomans in the Battle of Petra, the final battle of the war. They then advanced to seize as much territory as possible before the Western powers imposed a ceasefire.

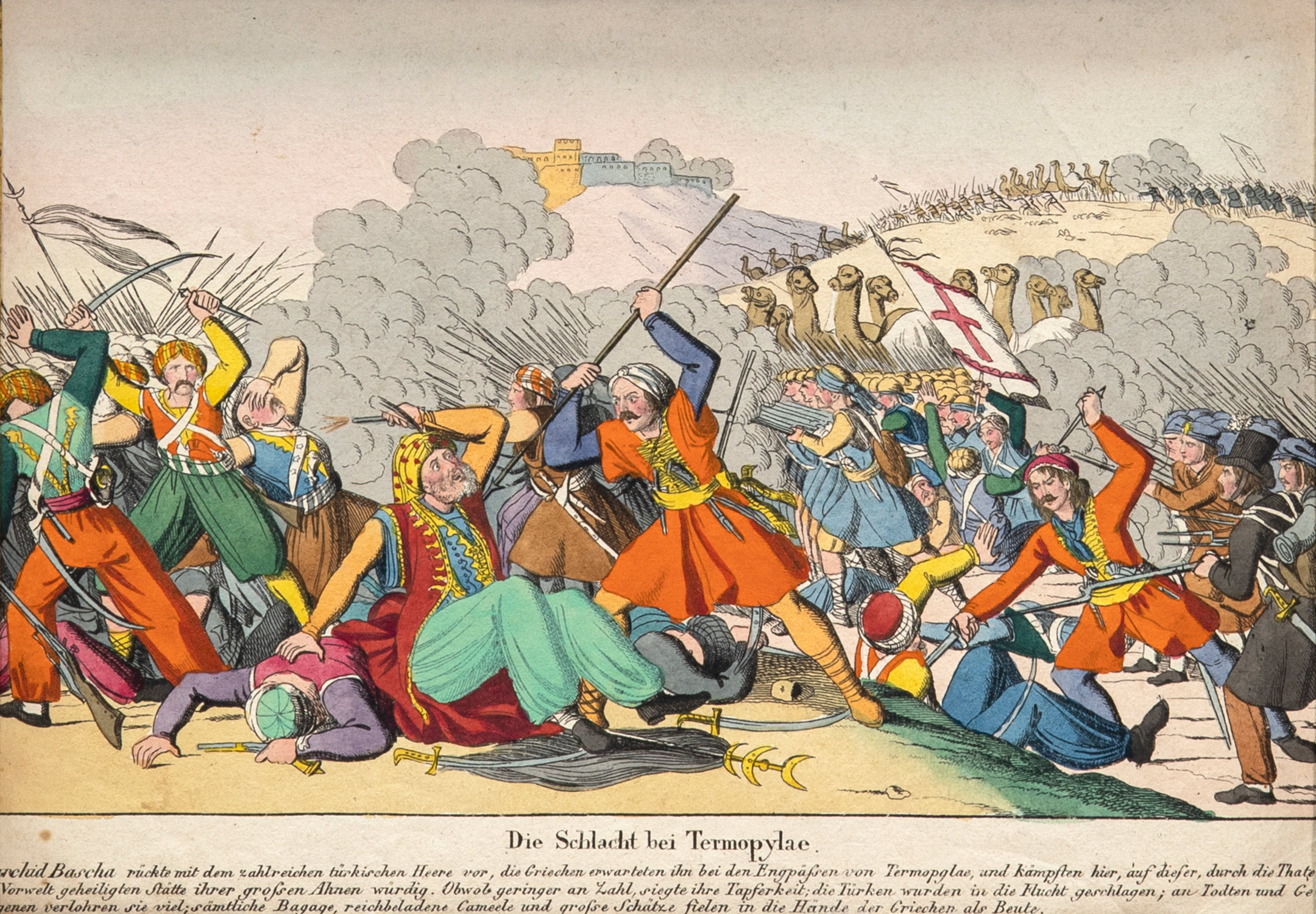
Battle between Greeks and Turks during the Greek War of Independence

A conference in London in 1830 proposed a fully independent Greek state (and not autonomous as previously proposed). The final borders were defined during the London Conference of 1832 with the northern frontier running from Arta to Volos, and including only Euboia and the Cyclades among the islands. The Greeks were disappointed at these restricted frontiers, but were in no position to resist the will of Britain, France and Russia, who had contributed mightily to Greek independence. By the Convention of 11 May 1832, Greece was finally recognized as a sovereign state.

Capodistria, who had been Greece's governor since 1828, had been assassinated by the Mavromichalis family in October 1831. To prevent further experiments with republican government, the Great Powers, especially Russia, insisted that Greece should be a monarchy, and the Bavarian Prince Otto was chosen to be its first King.

== See also ==
- Dragomans
- Giaour
- Greek Muslims
- List of former mosques in Greece
- Ionian Islands under Venetian rule
- Phanariotes
- Rayah
- Sipahis
- Timeline of Orthodoxy in Greece (1453–1821)
- Hellenoturkism

== Sources ==
- Finkel, Caroline. Osman's Dream: The Story of the Ottoman Empire, 1300–1923. New York: Basic Books, 2005. ISBN 978-0-465-02396-7.
- Hobsbawm, Eric John. The Age of Revolution. New American Library, 1962. ISBN 0-451-62720-2.
- Jelavich, Barbara. History of the Balkans, 18th and 19th Centuries. New York: Cambridge University Press, 1983. ISBN 0-521-27458-3.
- Paroulakis, Peter H. The Greek War of Independence. Hellenic International Press, 1984.
- Shaw, Stanford. History of the Ottoman Empire and Modern Turkey: Volume I. Cambridge: Cambridge University Press, 1977.
- Vacalopoulos, Apostolis. The Greek Nation, 1453–1669. Rutgers University Press, 1976.
