= Archaeological Museum of Butrint =

- Muzeu Arkeologjik i Butrintit
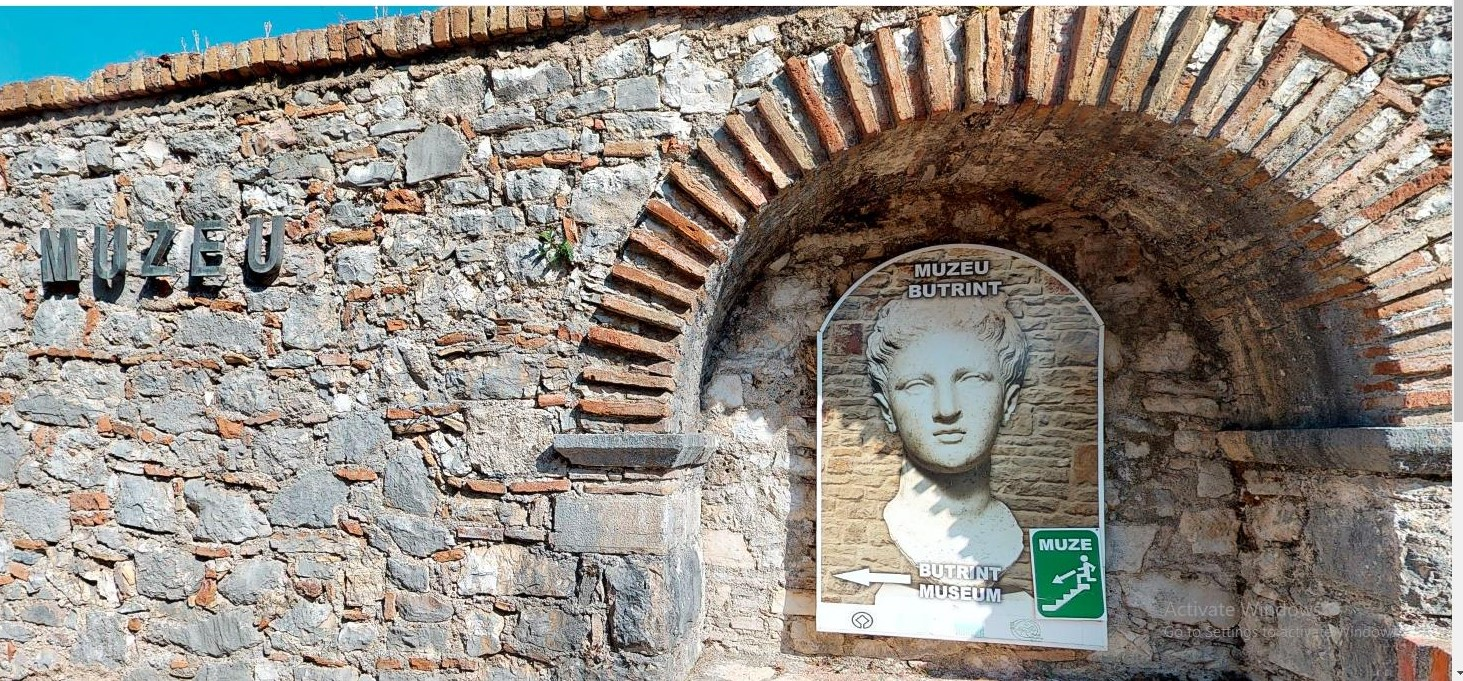
- Established: 1938; 88 years ago
- Location: Butrint, Albania
- Coordinates: 39°44′46″N 20°01′11″E
- Type: Archaeological Museum

The Archaeological Museum of Butrint (Albanian: Muzeu Arkeologjik i Butrintit) was opened in 1938. It was reopened during the 1950s-1960s in the premises of the Venetian Acropolis Castle within the acropolis of the ancient city. It contains the Graeco-Roman archaeological finds from the Italian Archaeological Mission of the period between the two World Wars (1928 - 1940), led by Luigi Maria Ugolini.

== History ==
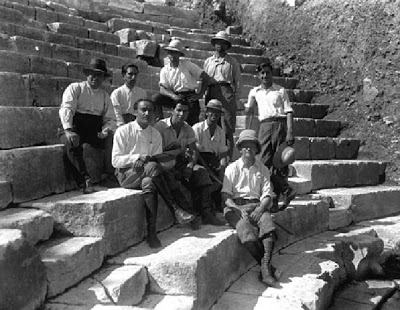
Luigi Maria Ugolini in Butrint c. 1932

Systematic excavations in Butrint by Albanian archaeologists during the years 1960-1980 significantly increased the number of items presented in this museum. The museum underwent several reconstructions, and in 1988 it took a more complete form, presenting the centuries-long history of the ancient city. The museum was closed from 1991 until 2005. The early 1990s and especially 1997 were fatal, as some of the objects were stolen from the museum premises. However, the museum building continued to be used during this period by archaeologists who stored the finds of the archeological excavation in the premises. In summer 2005, the museum was renovated and enriched with archaeological finds from the excavations of the joint project of the Institute of Archaeology and the Butrint Foundation starting from 1994. In 2008, the Butrint Museum continued to function under the auspices of the Butrint National Park, as it, until then, was under the auspices of the Institute of Archaeology (currently the Centre for Albanological Studies).

The year 2008 signed the return to the museum of the statues of Apollo and Artemis stolen from the museum in 1997. Currently, about 1325 objects (stone, bone, ceramic, glass, statue, coins, etc.) are displayed in the museum. These objects have been found not only in archeological excavations within Butrint, but also in the surroundings such as Diasporit, Kalivo, Xarra, Vrina plain, as well as Finiq. The presentation of the smaller inhabited centres in the surroundings of Butrint enables the better understanding of the preconditions for the rise and development of Butrint during the Hellenistic and Roman periods.

== Collections ==
The entire collections of the museum are presented on the basis of three criteria namely:

- the chronological one, which aims to display the development of the city in different periods of time from the prehistory (Stone Age) to its decline during the Middle Ages;
- the thematic one, to show aspects from everyday economic and social life such as handicrafts, trade, relations with the region and the Mediterranean, art, religion, education, etc.;
- the didactic one that is developed through the use of information panels, maps, sketches, models, three-dimensional reconstructions of the main monuments. The rich collection and the inspiring landscape have turned it into one of the most visited archeological centers in Albania. The Virtual tour of this museum is available through the webpage of the Ministry of Culture of the Republic of Albania.

== Gallery ==
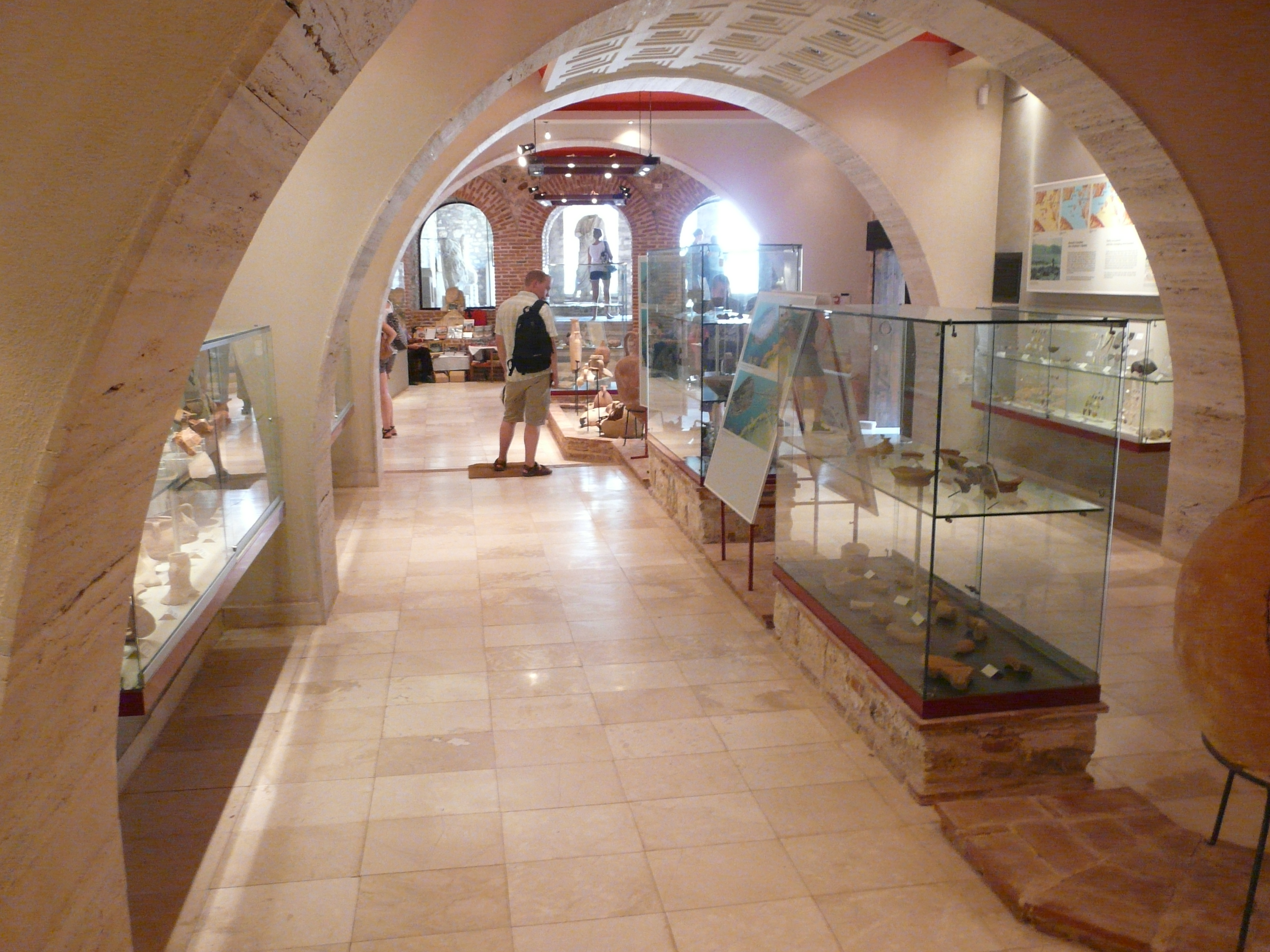
Inside the Archaeological Museum of Butrint

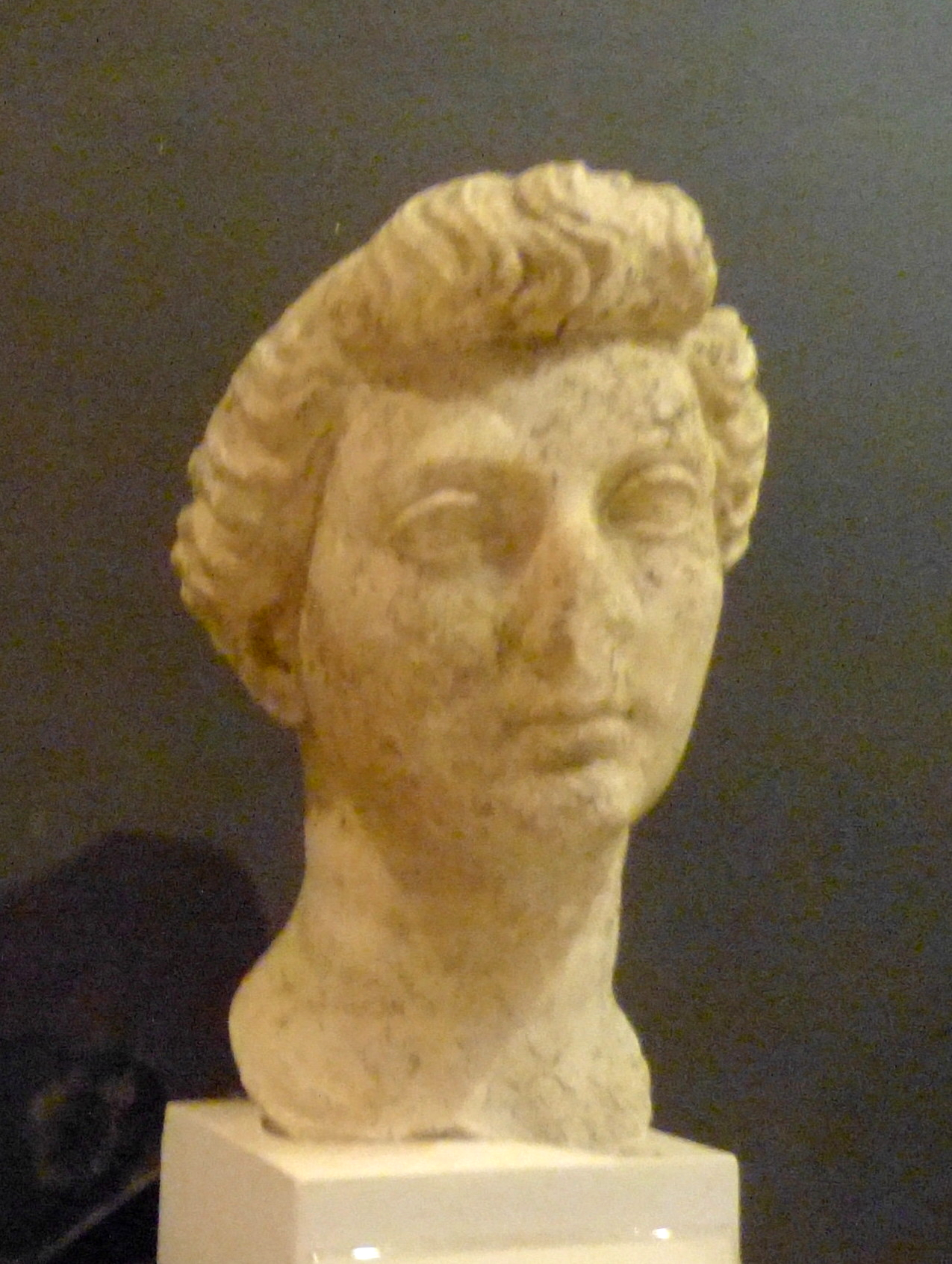
Bust of Livia Drusilla

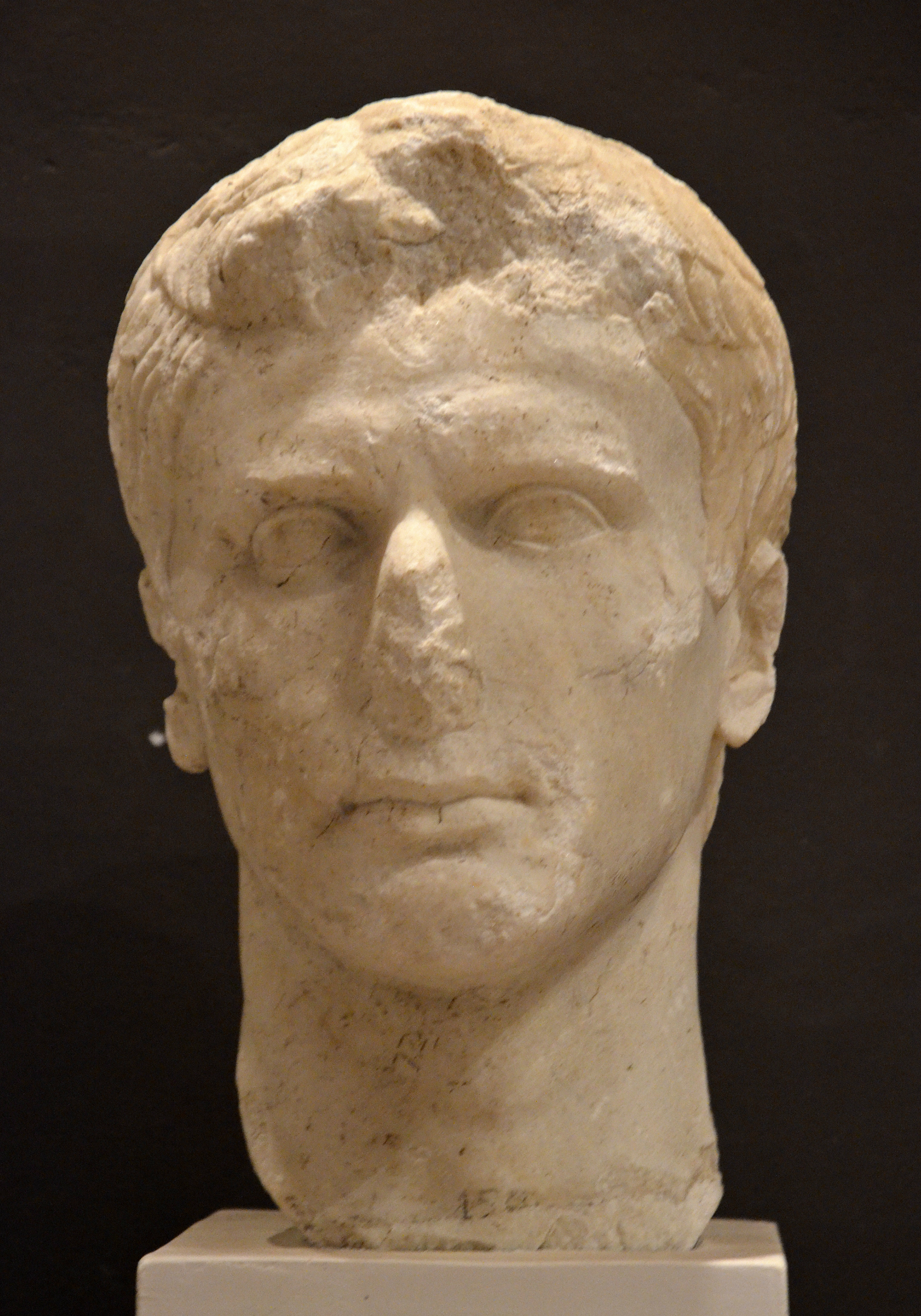
Bust of Augustus

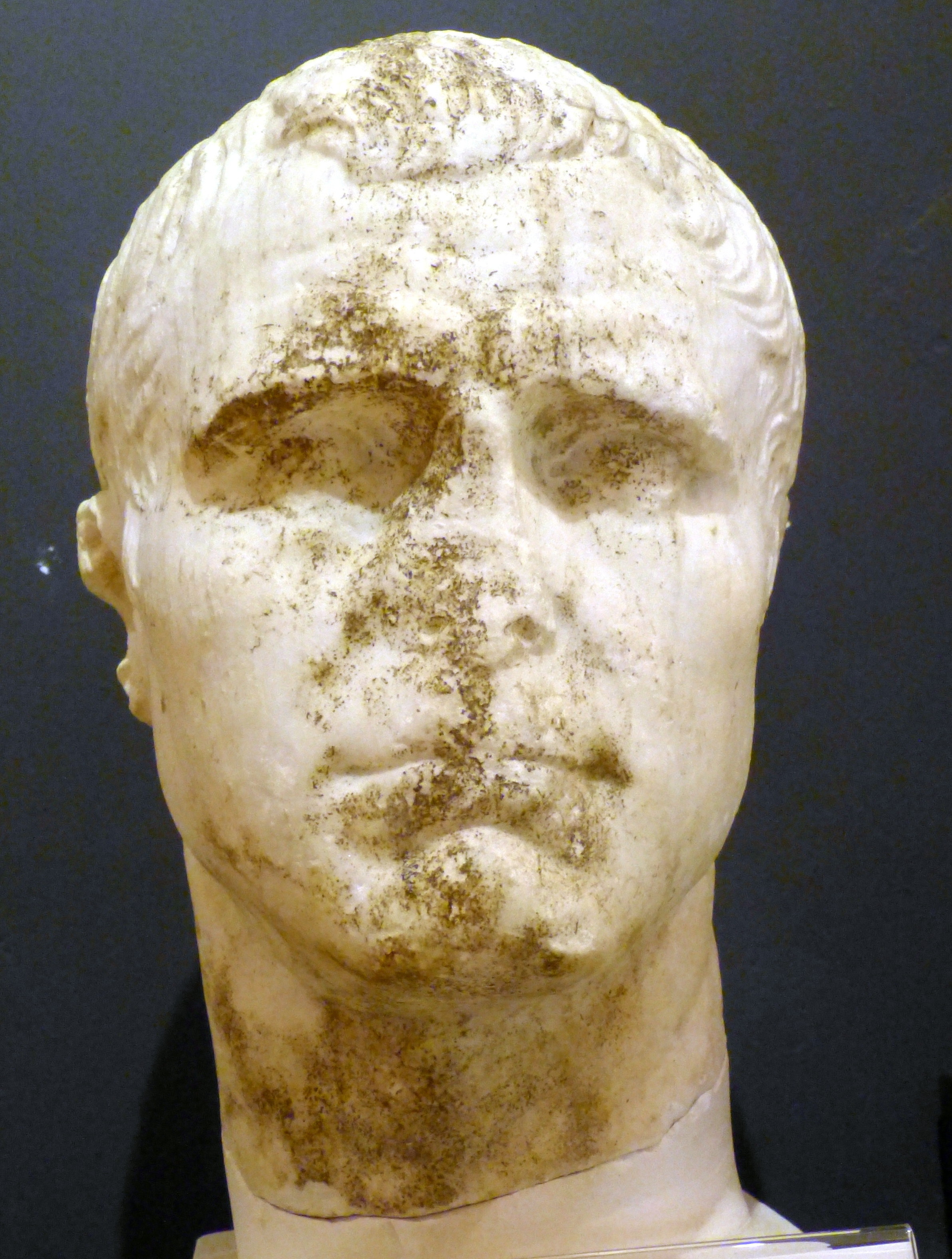
Bust of Marcus Vipsanius Agrippa

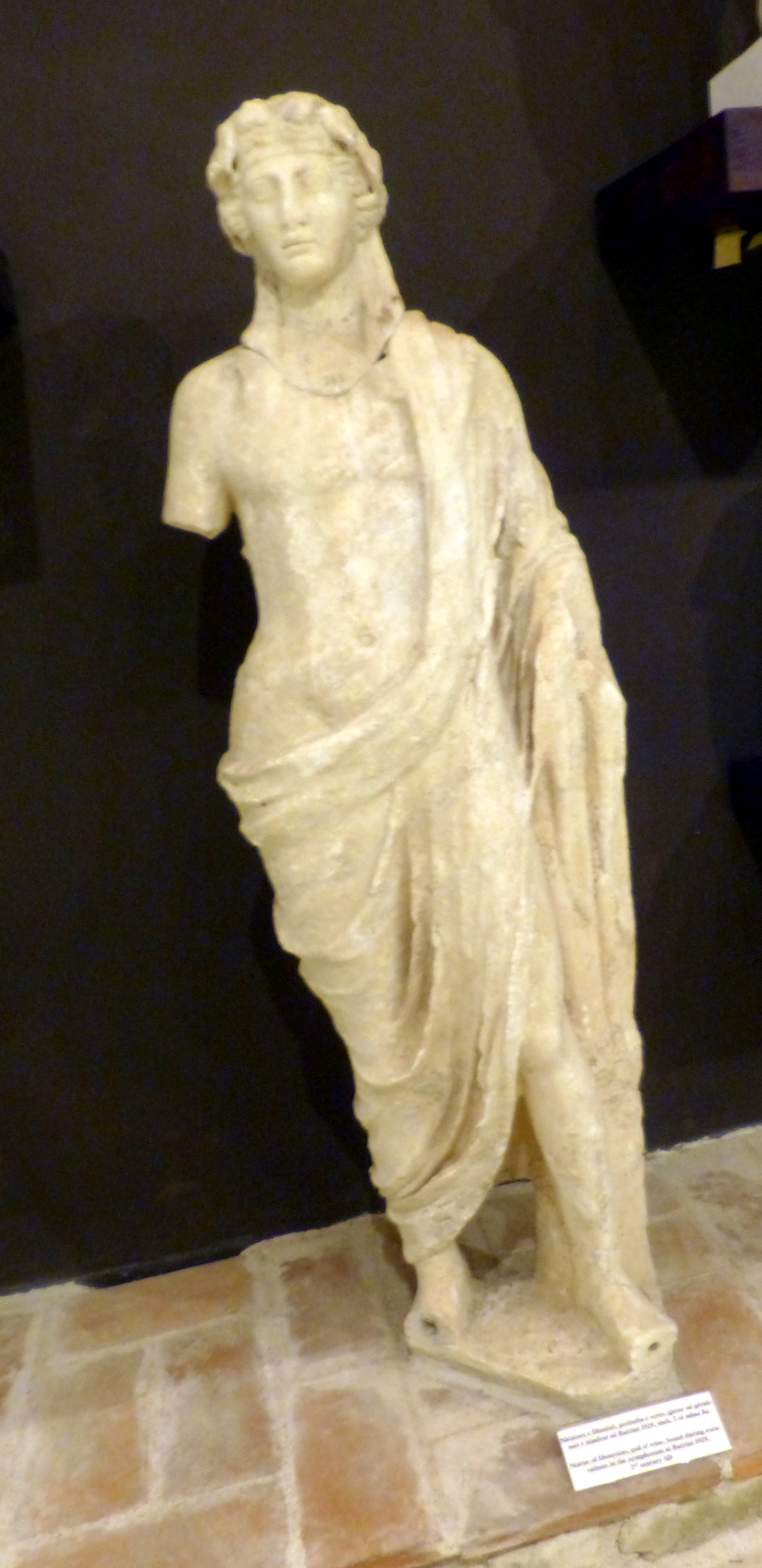
Statue of Dionysos from the Butrint nymphaeum

== See also ==
- Butrint
- Ali Pasha Castle
- Butrint National Park
- List of museums in Albania

== Bibliography ==
- Neritan Ceka, Buthrotum (translated from Albanian by Pranvera Xhelo), Migjeni, Tirana, 2002.
- Neritan Ceka (2006), Buthrotum. Its history and monuments, Tirana: Migjeni, ISBN 99943-672-8-5
- José C. Carvajal, Ana Palanco (2011), "Kalaja e Ali Pashës në Butrint", in Solinda Kamani (ed.), Butrinti në shekuj, Tirana: Albanian Heritage Foundation, pp. 190–215, ISBN 978-9928-147-01-1
- Ugolini, Luigi Maria; Liberati, Annamaria; Miraj, Lida (2003). The Theatre at Butrint: Luigi Maria Ugolini's Excavations at Butrint 1928-1932 (Albania Antica IV). British School at Athens. ISBN 978-0-904887-44-0.
- Ugolini L. M., Butrinto il Mito D'Enea, gli Scavi. Rome: Istituto Grefico Tiberino, 1937 (reprint Tirana: Istituto Italiano di Cultura, 1999).
