= Islets of Ksamil =

Group of islands in southern Albania and a tourist attraction

Native name: Ishujt e Ksamilit
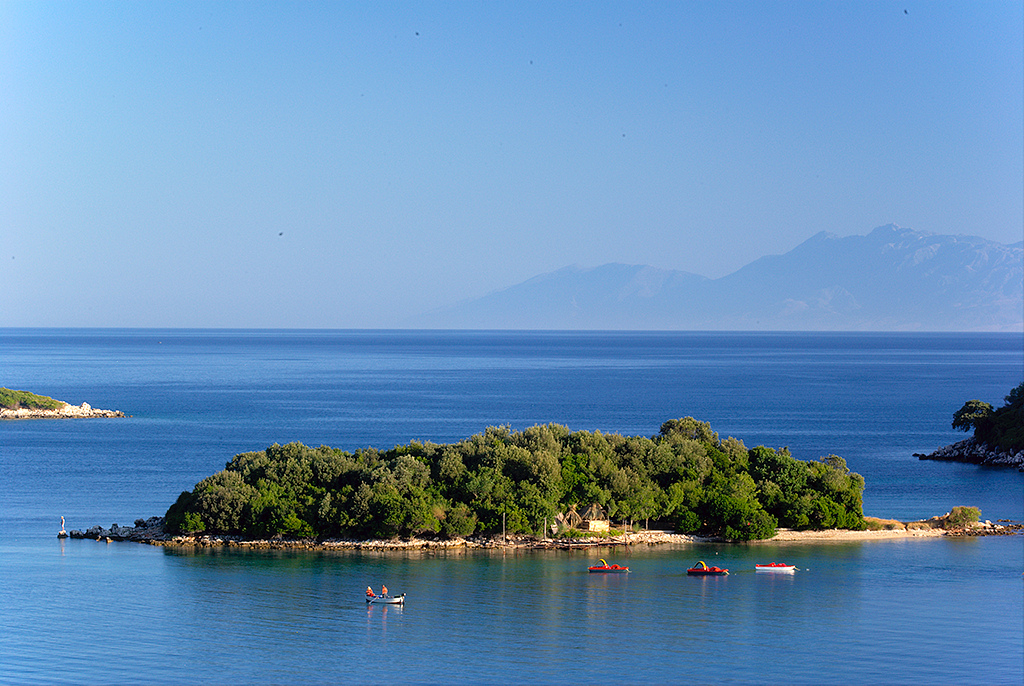
- View of one of the islets
- Interactive map of Islets of Ksamil

Geography
- Coordinates: 39°46′30″N 19°59′42″E
- Total islands: 4
- Area: 0.089 km^{2} (0.034 sq mi)

Administration
- Albania
- County: Vlorë County
- District: Sarandë

The Islets of Ksamil (Albanian: Ishujt e Ksamilit or Ishujt e Tetranisit), consist of four rocky islets located in the direct proximity to the Ionian Sea in Southern Albania. The village of Ksamil, after whom the islets are named, is located to the east of the islets. Furthermore, the islands are situated within the boundaries of the Butrint National Park.

The islets lie to the extreme south of the Albanian Riviera along the Ionian Sea. They are remote and can only be accessed by boat. The combined areas of the four islands is only 8.9 hectares (22.0 acres). The two outer islands are connected by a narrow strip of sand. In terms of geology, the islands have been shaped into its current form over the Jurassic period, with its disjunction of the mainland due to the water activity.

The islets fall phytogeographically within the Illyrian deciduous forests terrestrial ecoregion of the Palearctic Mediterranean forests, woodlands, and scrub biome. The vegetation of the islands includes many communities of a Mediterranean type, while the most important habitats include the Mediolitoral and Infralitoral zone. The seagrasses along the coast are dominated by posidonia oceanica, halophila stipulacea and cymodocea nodosa. Posidonia oceanica is mostly abundant in the shallow waters and can extend more down to more than 30 metres in the depth. The forested land area is mostly covered by species such as holly oak, common alder, elm, bay laurel and myrtle. The marine waters are rich in cetacean diversities including such as short-beaked common dolphin and common bottlenose dolphin.

== Gallery ==
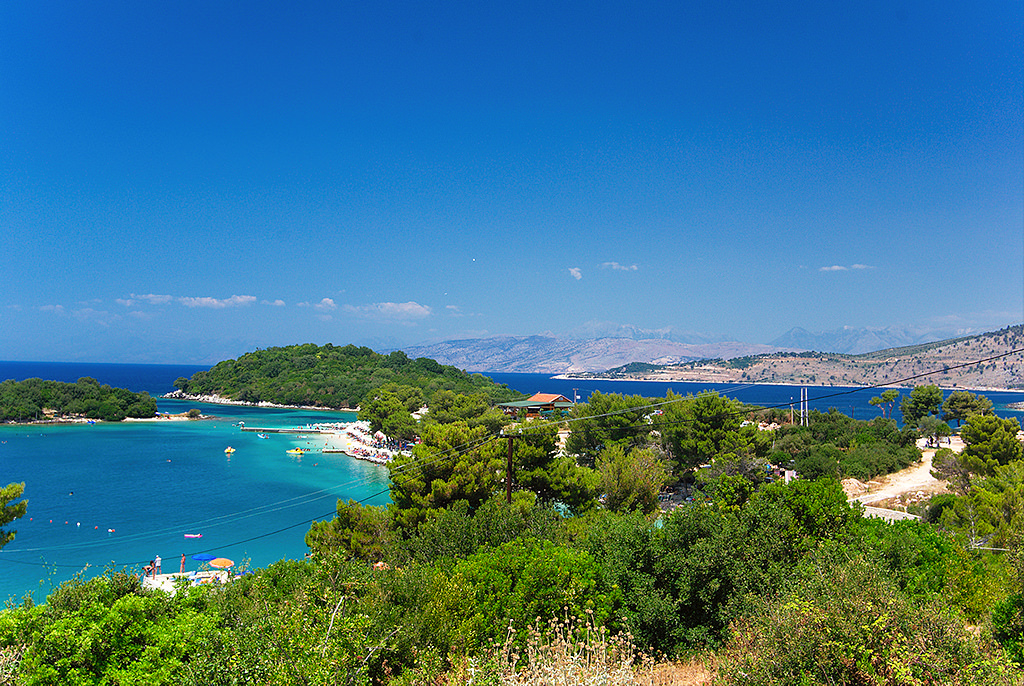

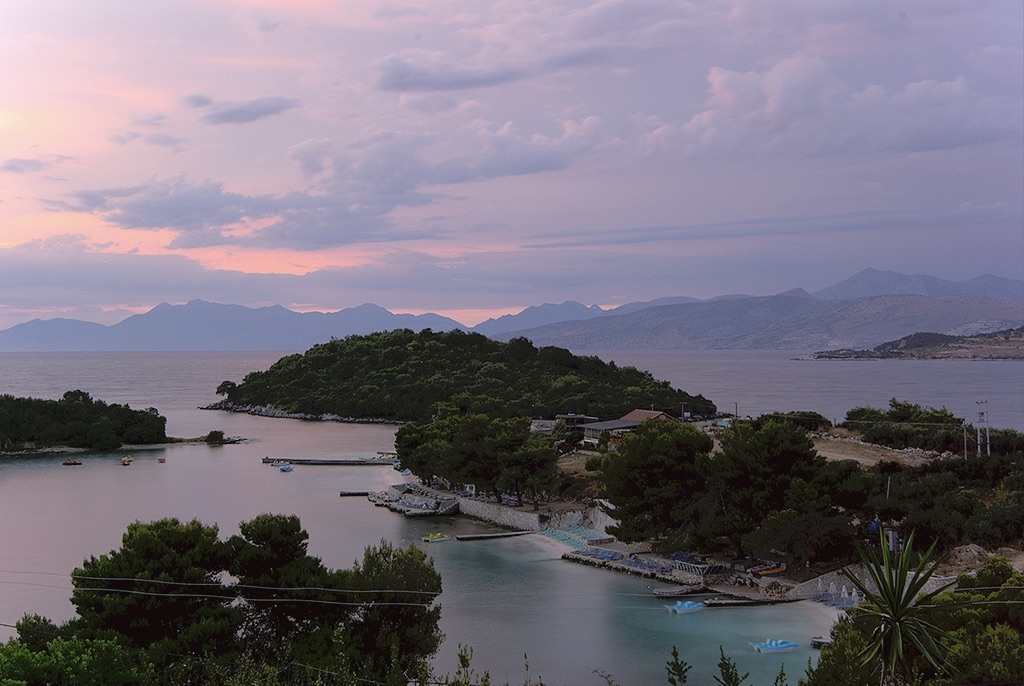

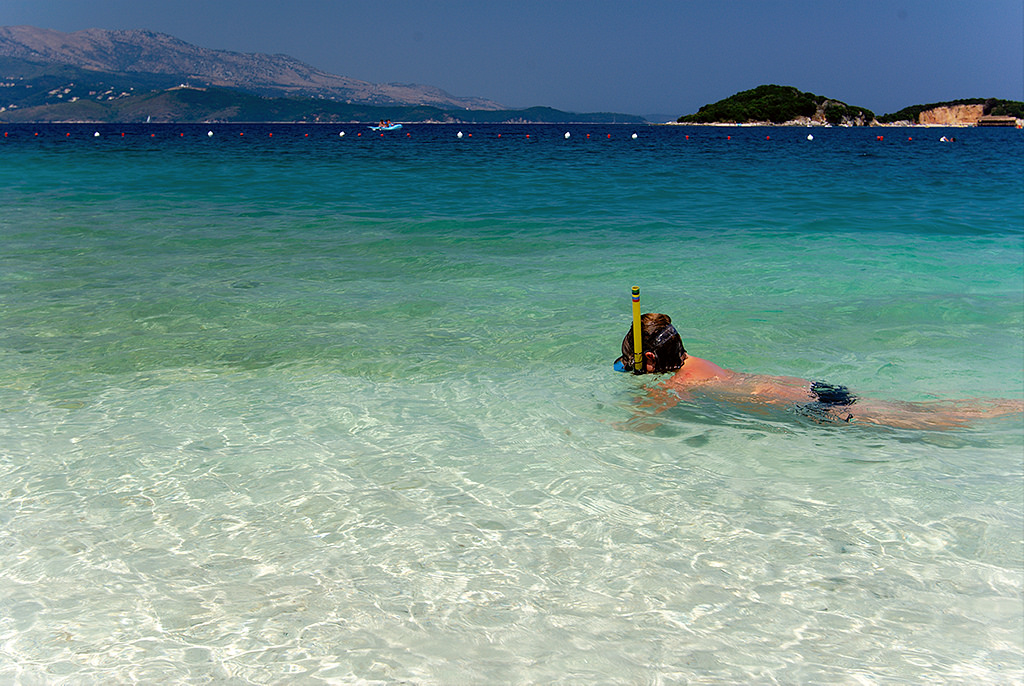

== See also ==
- Geography of Albania
- Islands of Albania
- Protected areas of Albania
- Butrint National Park
- Albanian Ionian Sea Coast
