= Venetian Fortress of Butrint =

- Kalaja Venedikase e Akropolit
- Butrint, in Southern Albania
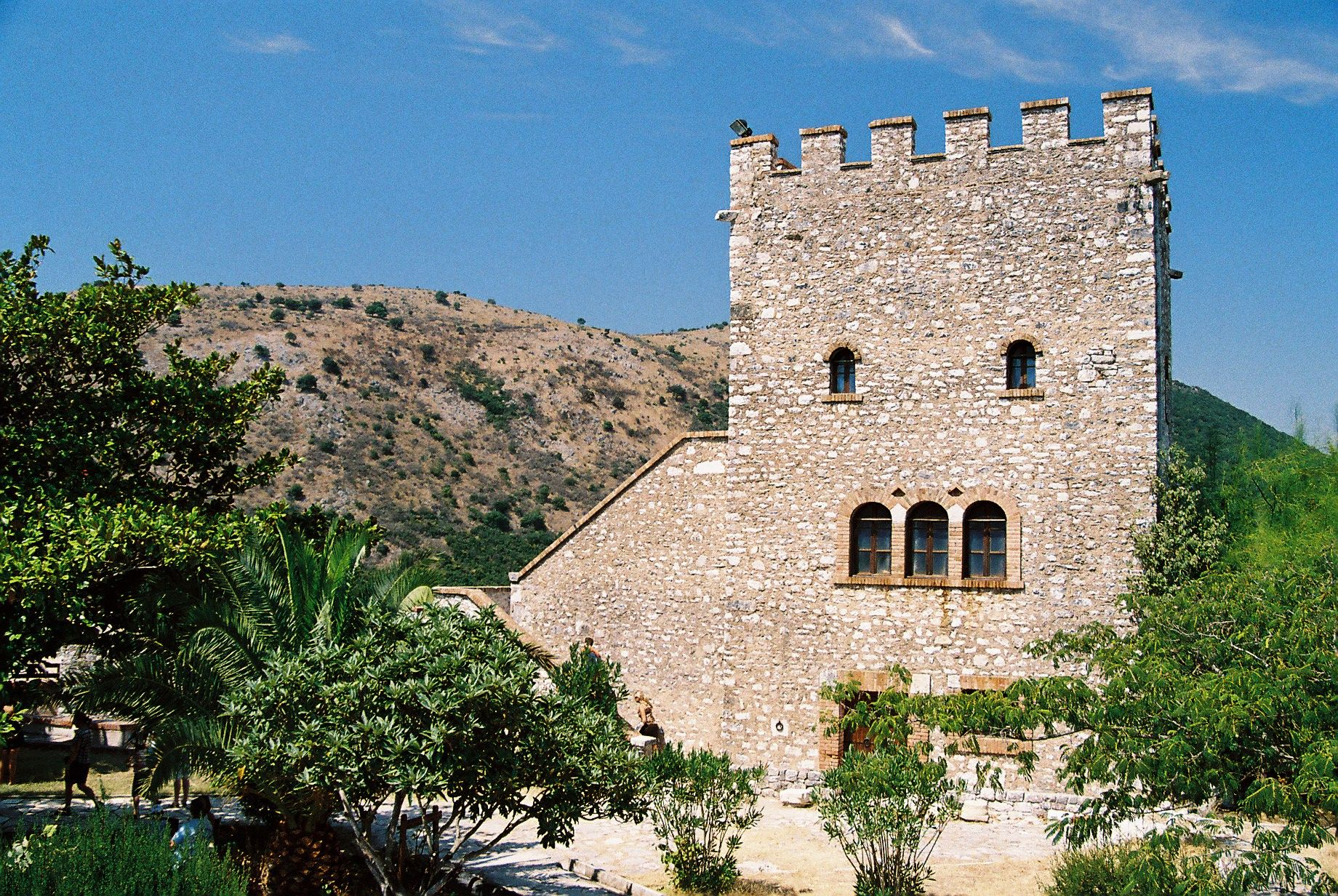
- Venetian Fortress of Butrint

Site information
- Owner: Albania
- Controlled by: Republic of Venice; French First Republic; Ottoman Empire; Albania
- Open to the public: Yes

Location
- Coordinates: 39.74623717204898°N 20.019894806259728°E

Site history
- Built: 14th century
- Materials: Ancient Blocks

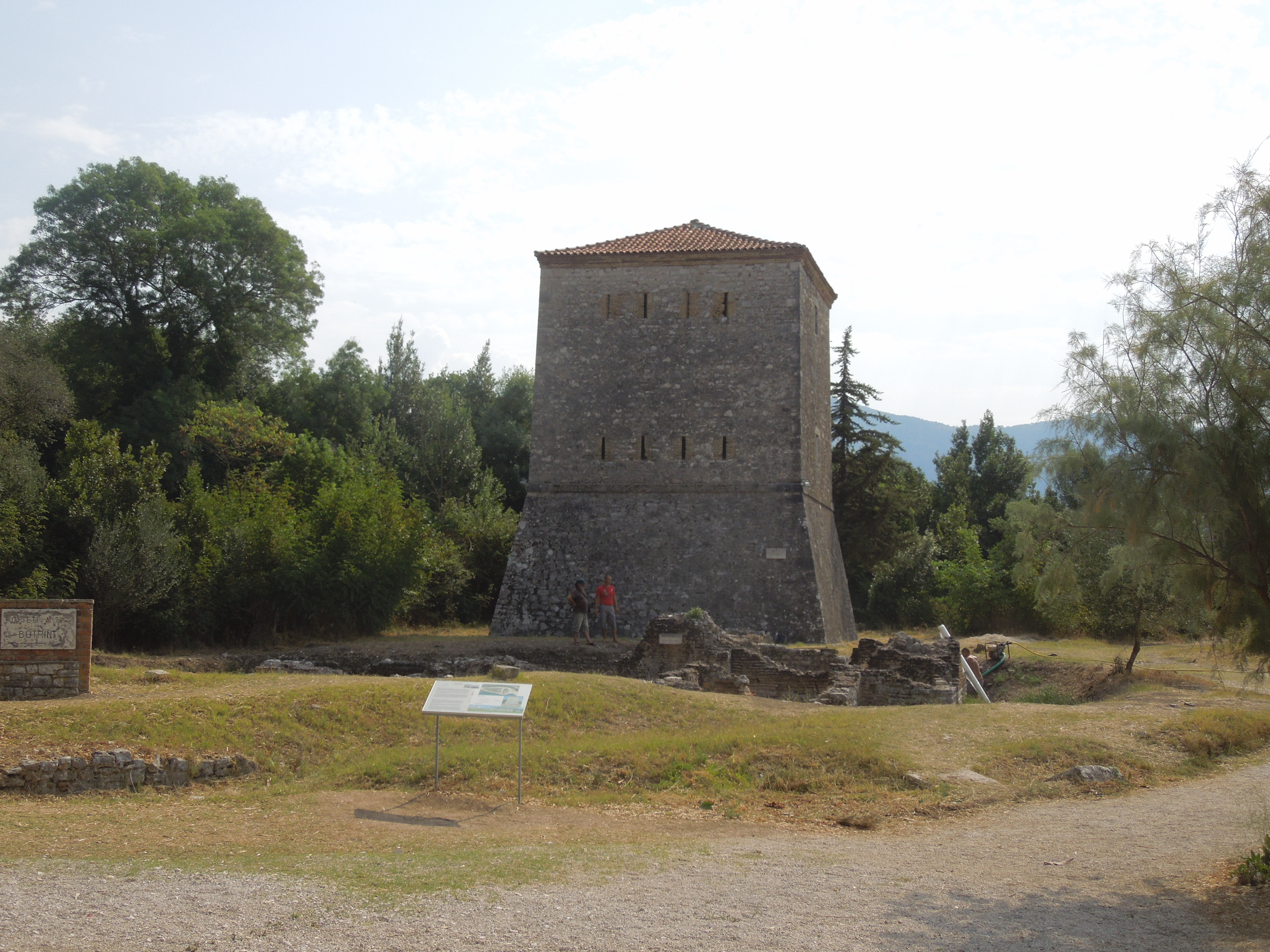
A Venetian tower at the foothill of the Venetian Acropolis Castle

The Venetian Fortress of Butrint (Albanian: Kalaja Venedikase e Akropolit) is a castle on the Butrint Peninsula in southern Albania. The castle is located by the Channel of Vivari within the Butrint National Park and close to the neighbouring Venetian Triangular Castle.

In 1386 the Venetians purchased the land around Butrint from the Angevin Kingdom of Naples. The castle was shortly built after the purchase on the highest point of the peninsula. In 1572, during the wars between Venetian and the Ottoman Empire, the Venetian Acropolis Castle was abandoned. This led to the creation of the Venetian Triangular Castle which was built across the Channel of Vivari as a replacement settlement to protect the fish traps, a very important source of food and income for its settlement.

The castle and the surrounding area came under French rule in 1797. In 1798, Ali Pasha of Tepelena conquered it, and in 1822 it came under direct Ottoman rule until Albanian Independence in 1912. The Castle was restored by Luigi Maria Ugolini. As per 1936, it houses the Archaeological Museum of Butrint.

== Gallery ==
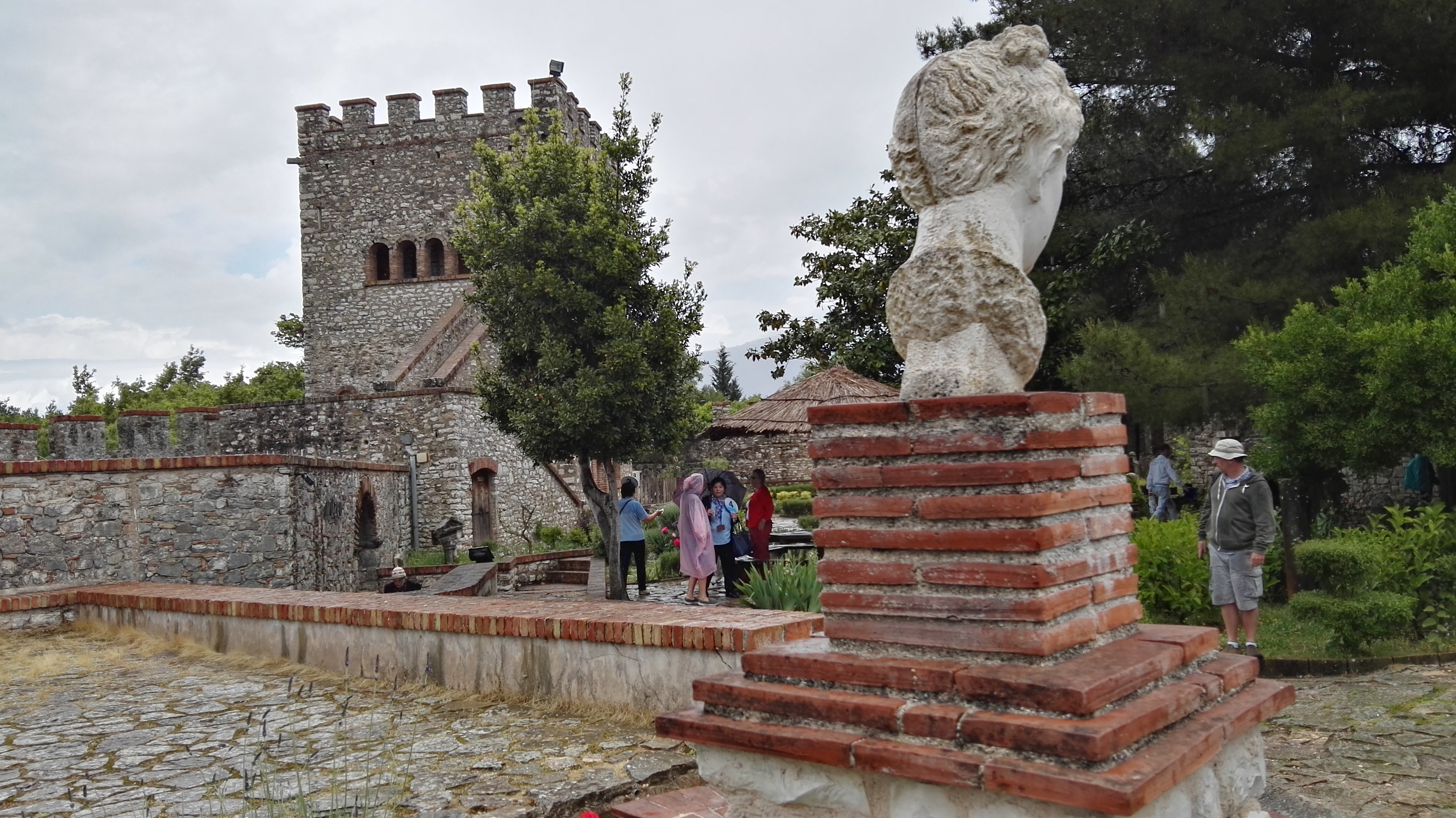
Inside the Castle

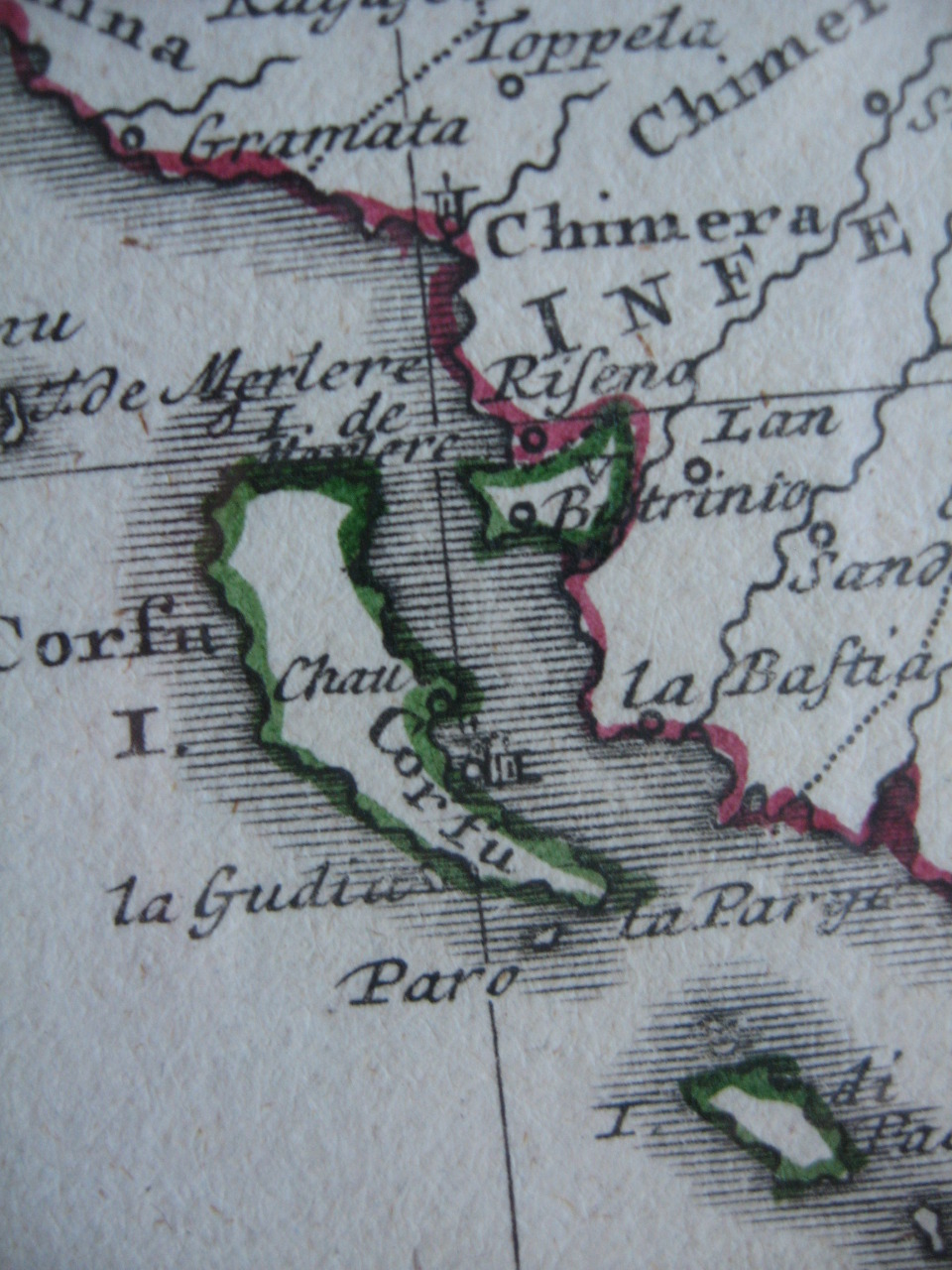
Venetian Exclave of Butrint

== See also ==
- Venetian Triangular Castle
- Butrint
- Butrint National Park
- Lake Butrint
- Channel of Vivari
- List of castles in Albania
- Tourism in Albania
- History of Albania
