= Vivari Channel =

Tourist attraction in southwestern Albania

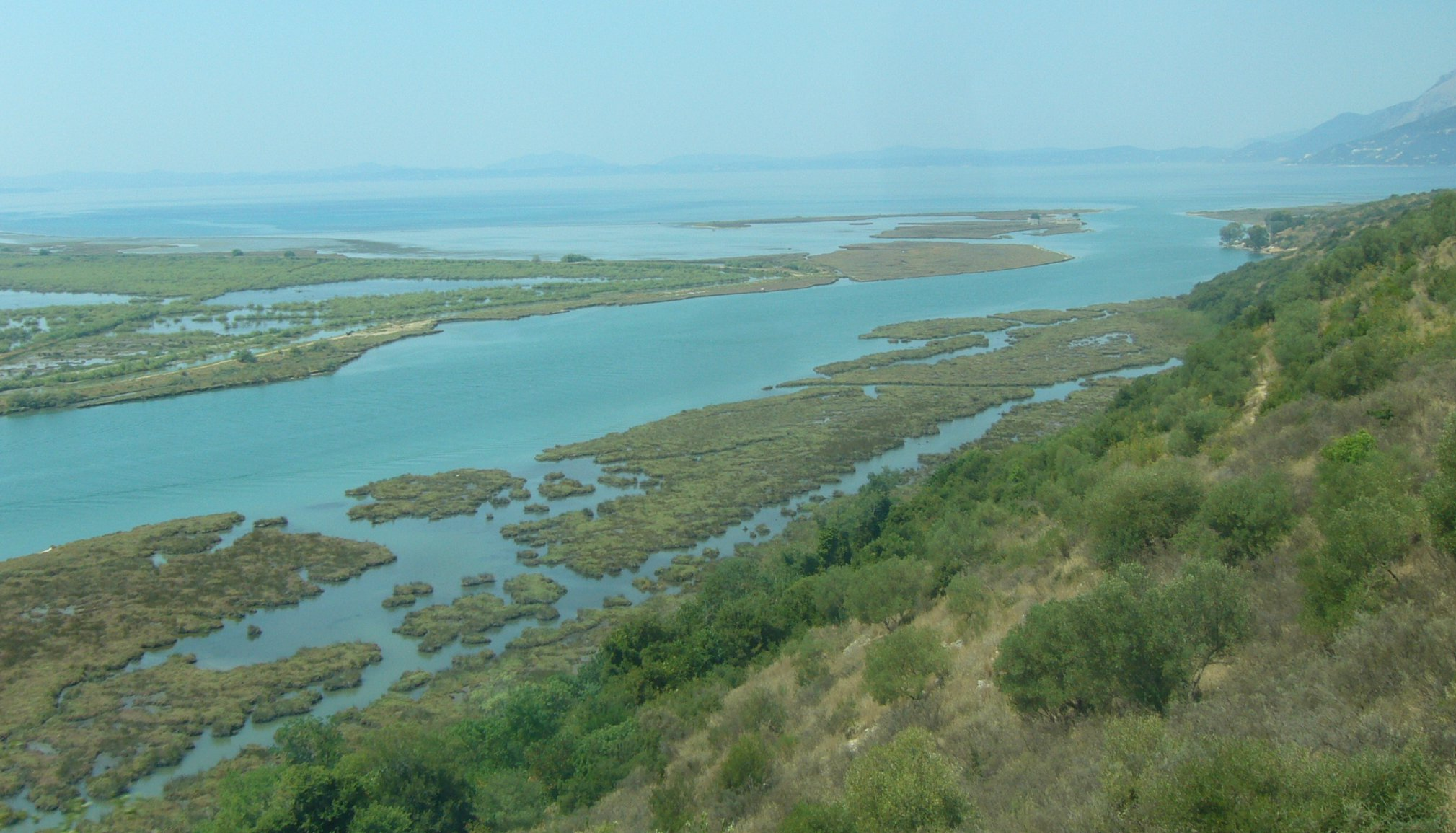
- Panoramic view of the Channel of Vivari

- Location within Albania
- Location: Sarandë, Vlorë
- Coordinates: 39°44′40″N 20°0′42″E
- Basin countries: Albania
- Max. length: 2.5 km (1.6 mi)
- Max. width: ca. 80 m (260 ft)
- Average depth: ca. 6 m (20 ft)
- Surface elevation: 1 m (3 ft 3 in)

The Vivari Channel (Albanian: Kanali i Butrintit, also known as Butrinto River) links Lake Butrint in the extreme south of Albania with the Straits of Corfu, and forms a border of the peninsula of Butrint.

The natural channel flows in both directions every six hours, from the lake to the sea and vice versa during the rising tide facilitating the access of saline waters into Lake Butrint.

A pontoon is situated near the gate of the Butrint National Park. Two small forts, the Ali Pasha Castle and the Venetian Triangular Castle, are located near the mouth of the channel; both were built during the rule of Ali Pasha of Ioannina.

According to international organizations, the channel serves as the demarcation line where the Adriatic Sea ends and the Ionian Sea begins.

The channel creates a unique situation in Lake Butrint, which is partly fed with fresh water and partly with salt water, thereby creating ideal conditions for mollusks farming. During the communist regime, many students used to volunteer in the summer time to search for ancient ruins in the Butrint National Park.

== See also ==
- Butrinti
- Butrint National Park
- Venetian Acropolis Castle
- Venetian Triangular Castle
- Lake Butrint
- Lakes of Albania
- Lagoons of Albania
