= Butrint Lagoon =

Lake and tourist attraction in Albania

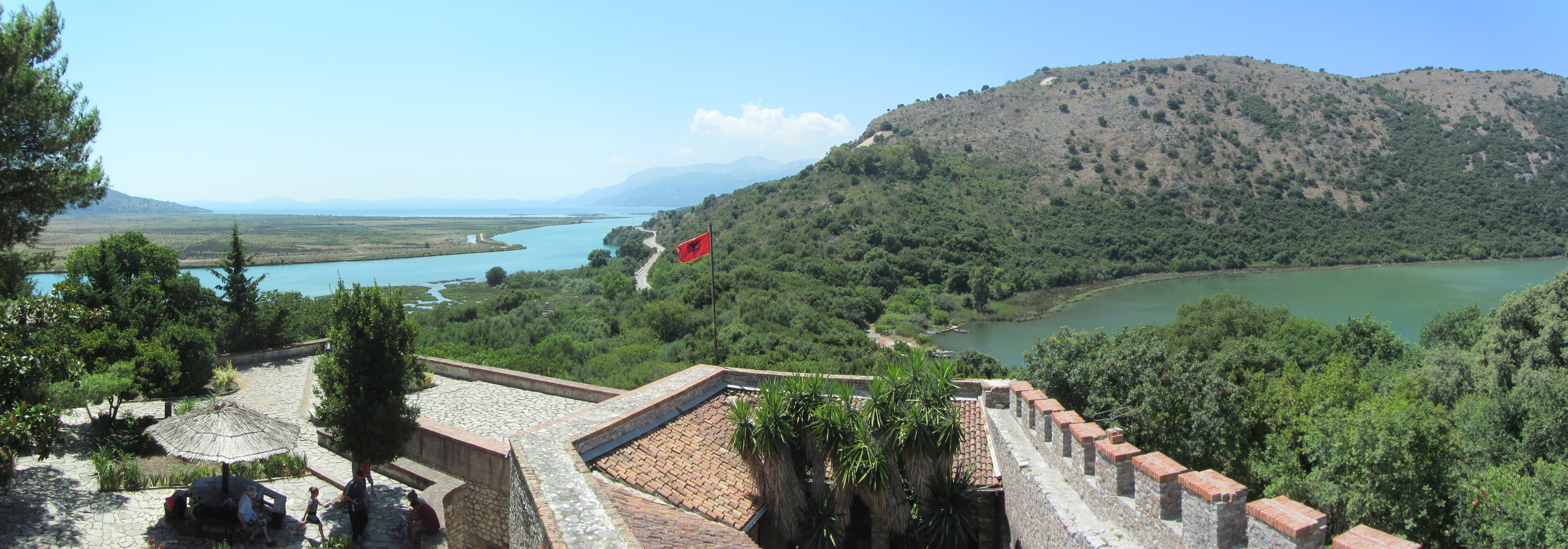
- Panoramic view of Lake Butrint

- Location within Albania
- Location: Sarandë, Vlorë County
- Coordinates: 39.78°N 20.03°E
- Basin countries: Albania
- Max. length: 7.1 km (4.4 mi)
- Max. width: 3.3 km (2.1 mi)
- Surface area: 16 km^{2} (6.2 sq mi)
- Average depth: 11.4 m (37 ft)
- Max. depth: 24.4 m (80 ft)
- Surface elevation: 1 m (3.3 ft)

Butrint Lagoon (Albanian: Liqeni i Butrintit) is a salt lagoon south of Saranda, Albania, located in direct proximity of the Ionian Sea. It is surrounded by dense forested hills, rocky coast and complemented by saltwater and freshwater marshlands. The lake has a length of 7.1 km (4.4 mi) and a width of 3.3 km (2.1 mi), with a surface area of 16 km^{2} (6.2 sq mi). The maximum depth of the lake is 24.4 m (80 ft). It is shaped like a giant footprint, pointing north. At its south, the Vivari Channel connects the lagoon to the sea.

== Flora and fauna ==
Butrint is particularly known for the diversity of its flora and fauna. The southern portion of the lake is situated within the boundaries of Butrint National Park and has been recognised as a wetland of international importance by designation under the Ramsar Convention. The lake has also been identified as an important Bird and Plant Area, because it supports significant numbers of bird and plant species.

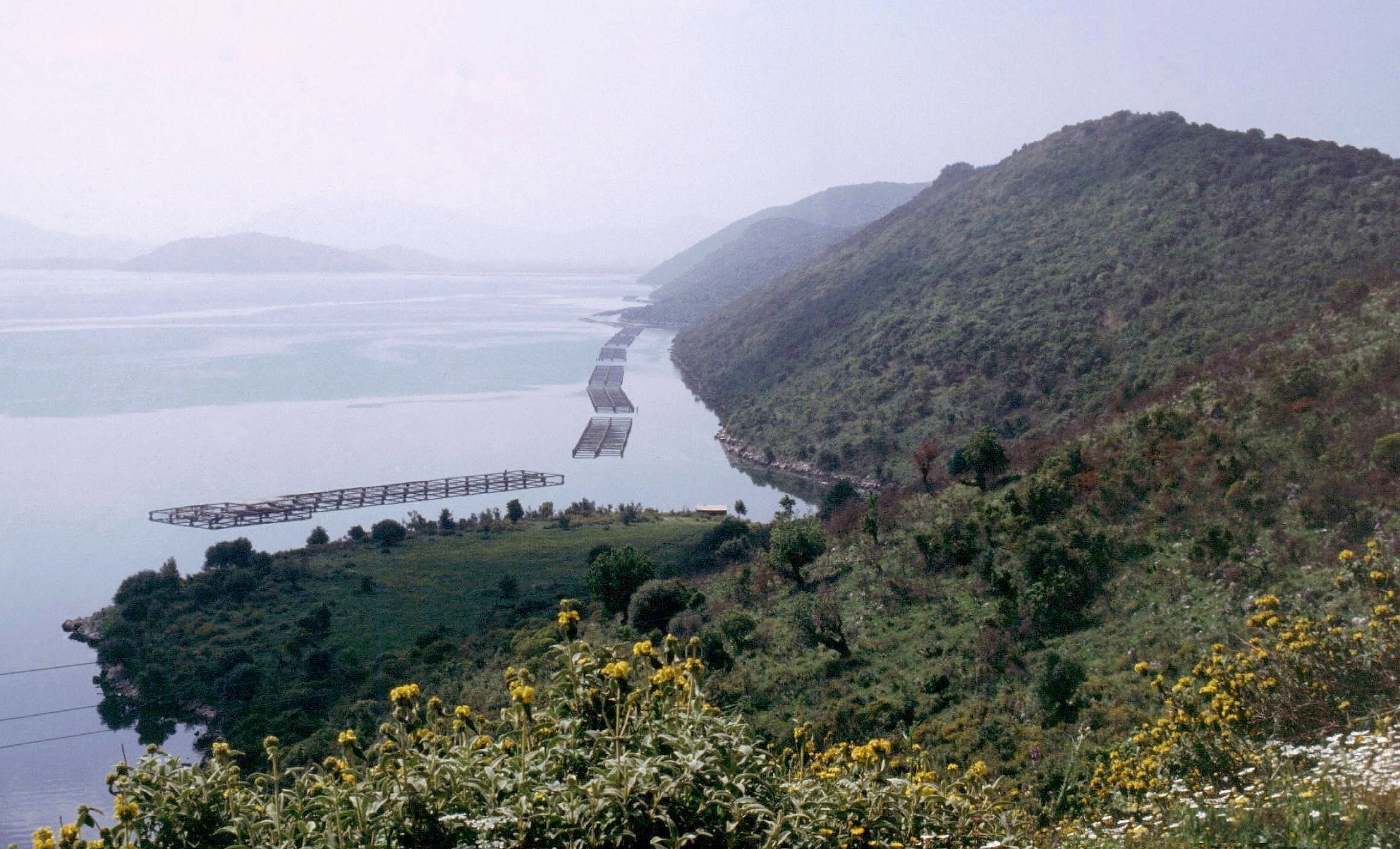
Near the shore arrangements to the breeding of Mediterranean mussels

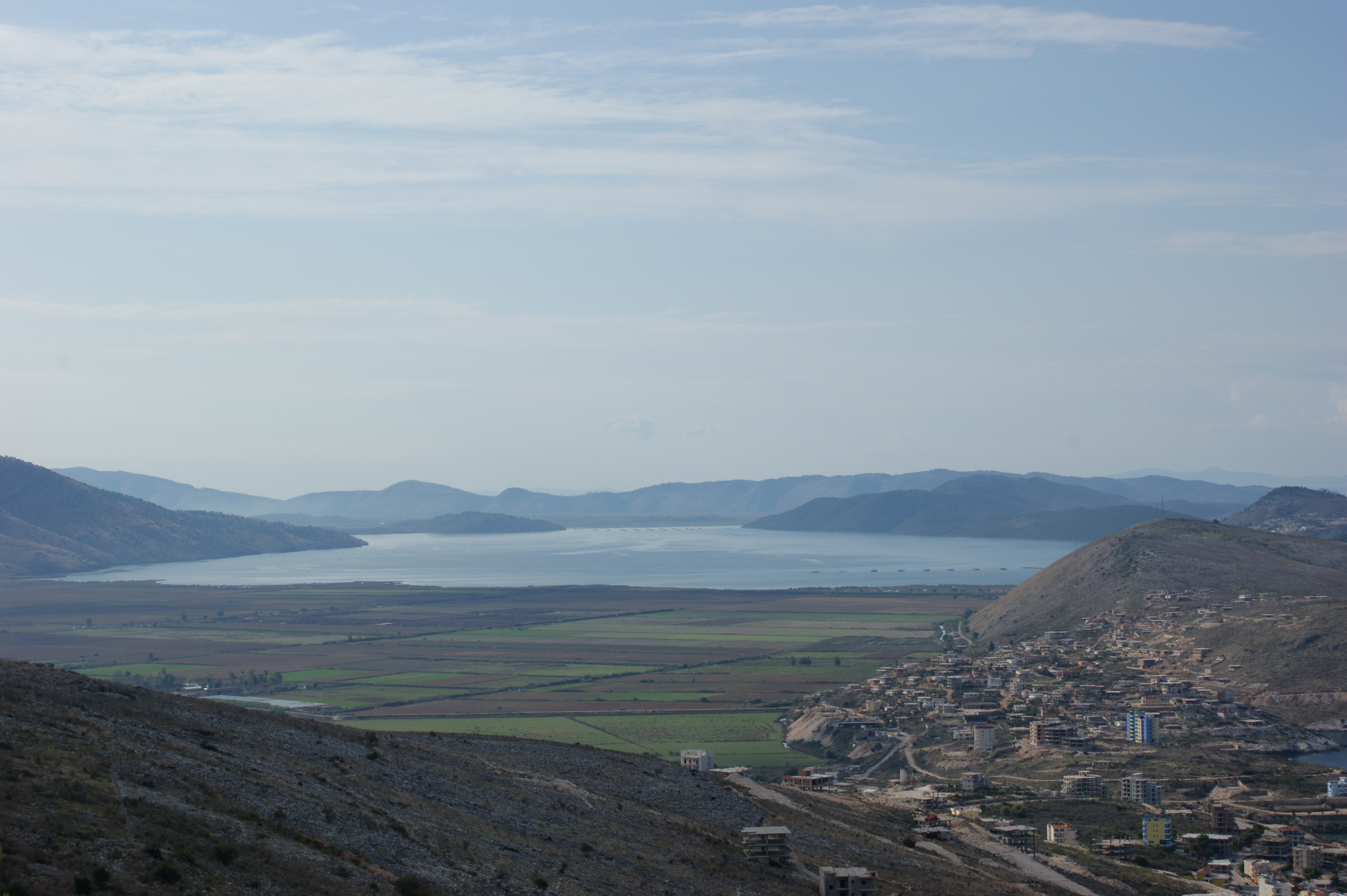
A view from the north of the lake

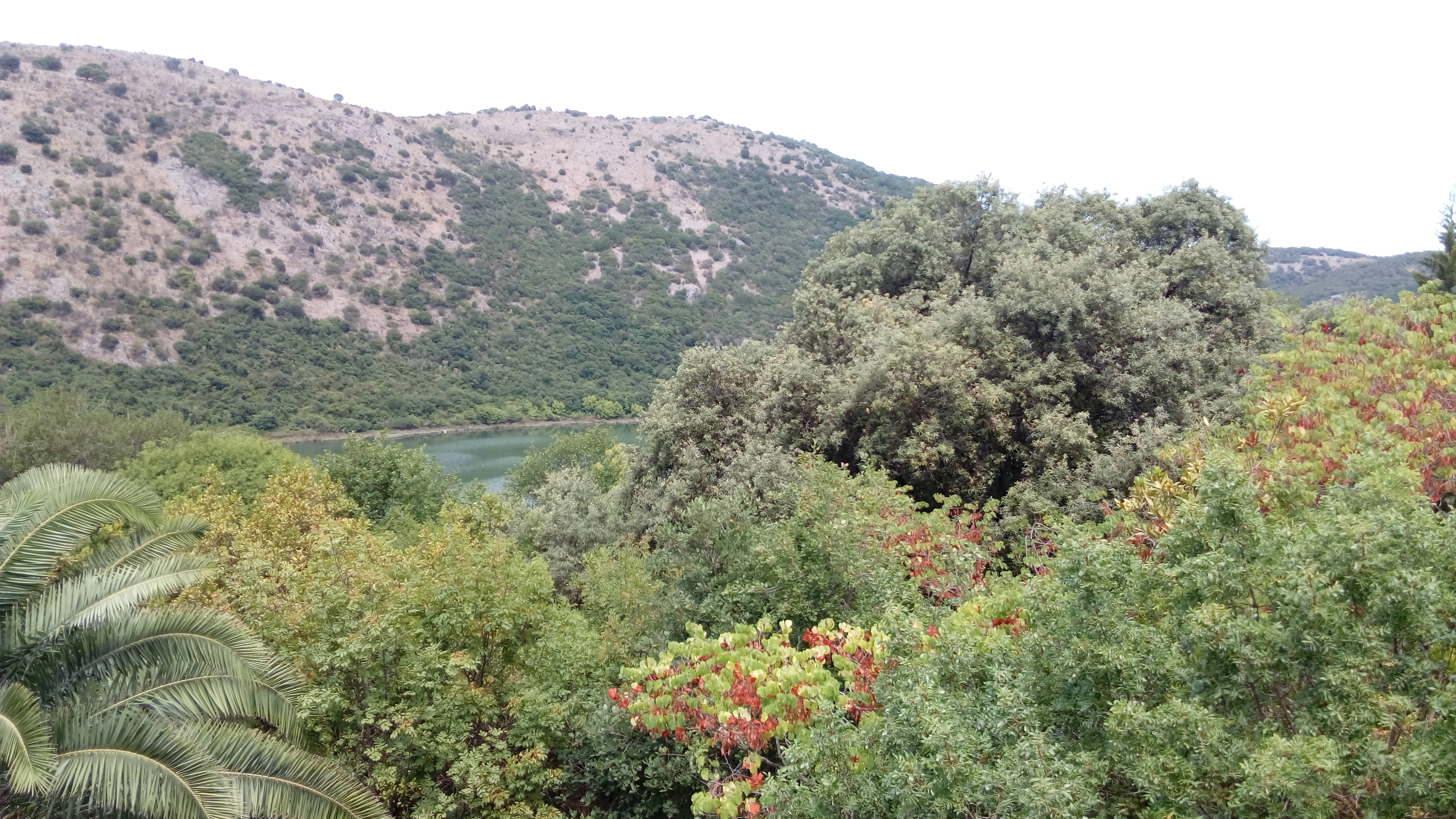
Forests of Butrint

== See also ==
- Butrinti
- Butrint National Park
- Venetian Acropolis Castle
- Venetian Triangular Castle
- Geography of Albania
- Lakes of Albania & Lagoons of Albania
