= Venetian Triangular Castle =

Castle

- Kalaja Trekëndore Venedikase
- Butrint, in Southern Albania
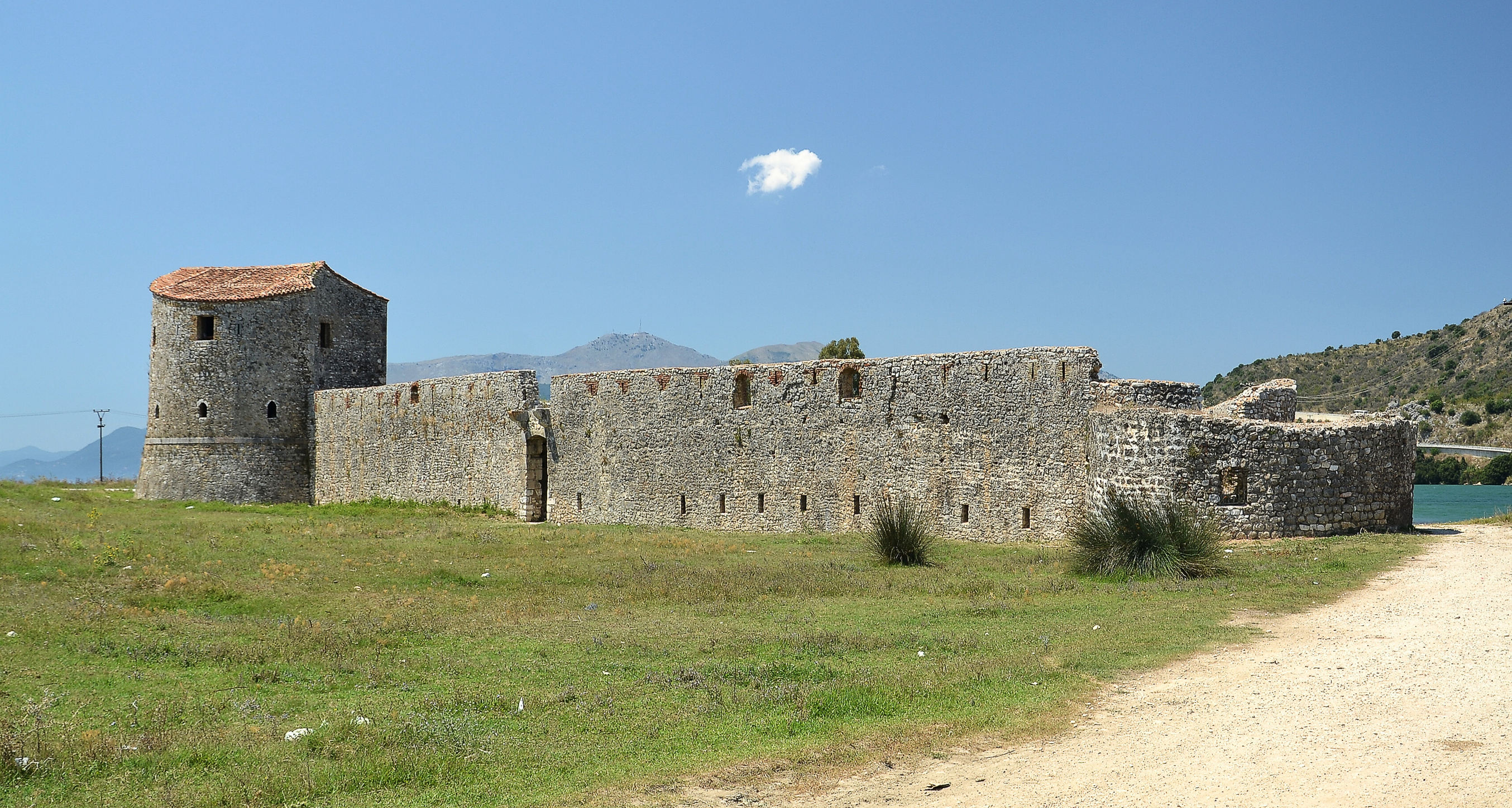
- The Venetian Castle

Site information
- Owner: Albania
- Controlled by: Republic of Venice; Ottoman Empire; Albania
- Open to the public: Yes

Location
- Coordinates: 39.742574425080086°N 20.019931877031066°E

Site history
- Built: 15th century
- Materials: Ancient Blocks

The Venetian Triangular Castle (Albanian: Kalaja Trekëndore Venedikase) is a castle near Butrint. The castle is located by the Channel of Vivari nearby Butrint National Park.

In 1572, during the wars between Venice and the Ottomans, the acropolis of Butrint was abandoned. This led to the creation of the Castle which was built in the 15th century by the Venetians. The castle was created to defend the fish traps, a very important source of food and income for the nearby settlement. The castle was seized by the Ottomans in 1655 and 1718 after then being recaptured by the Venetians.

== Gallery ==
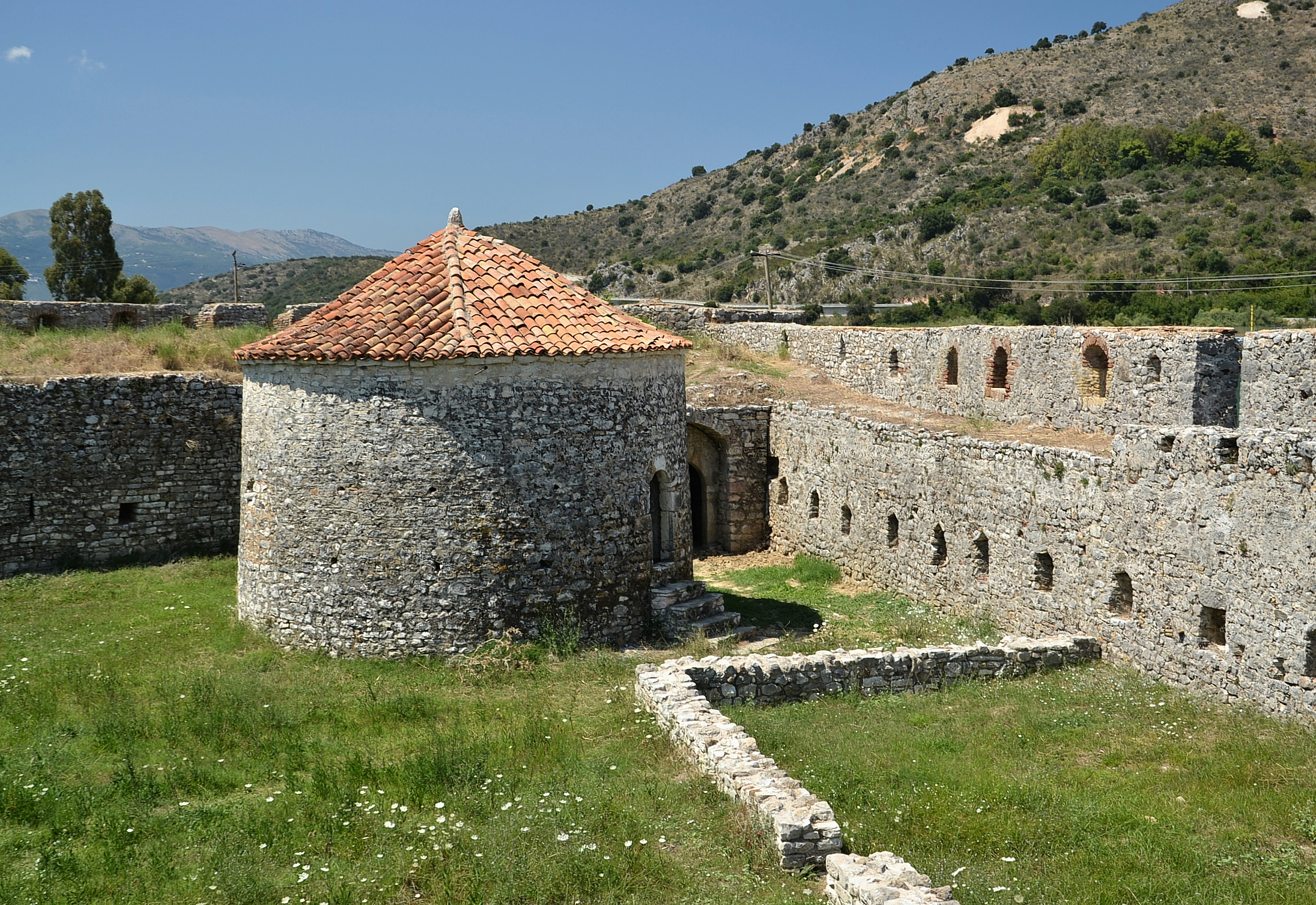
Inside of the Castle.

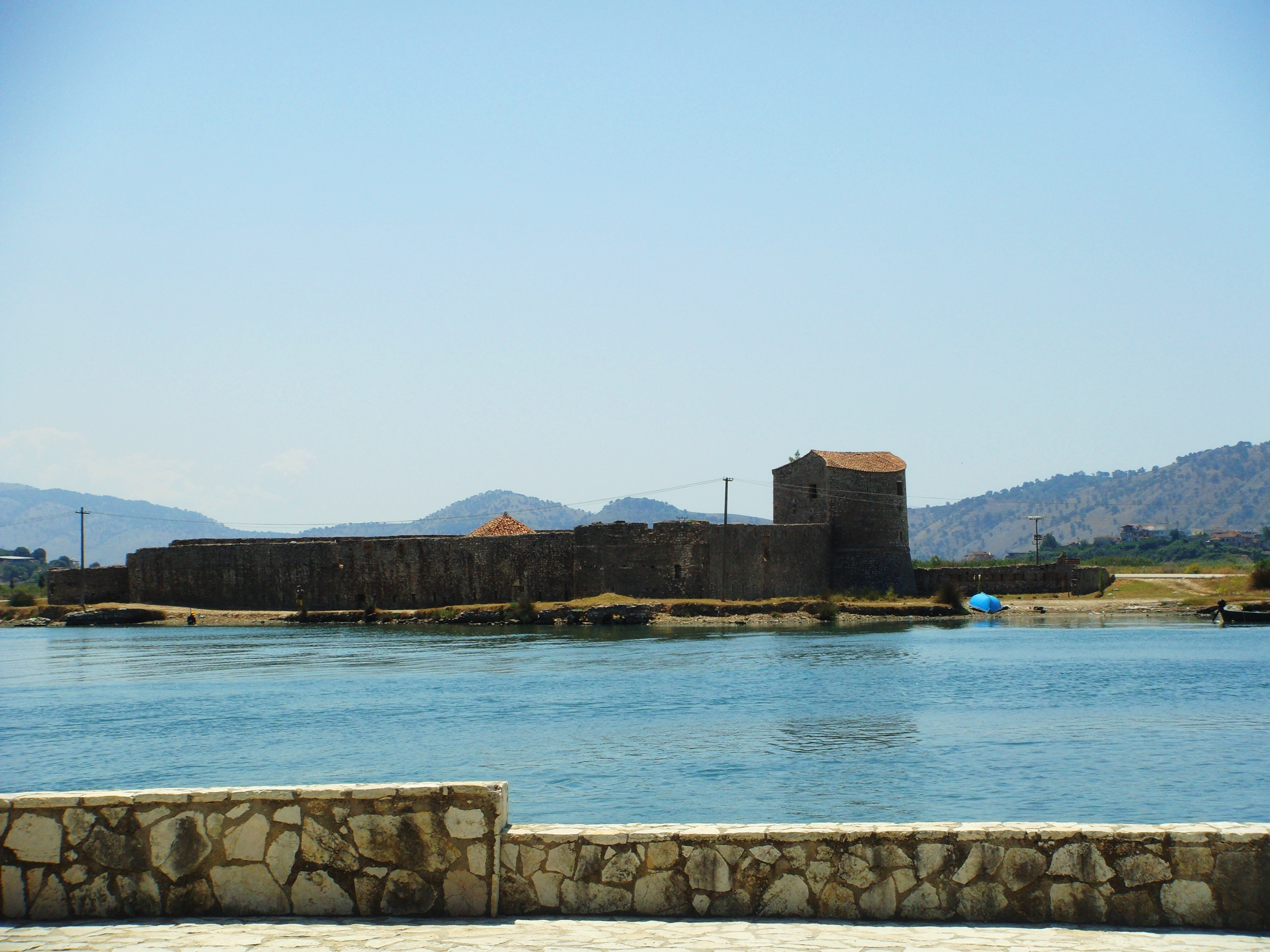
View of the Castle from across the Channel of Vivari.

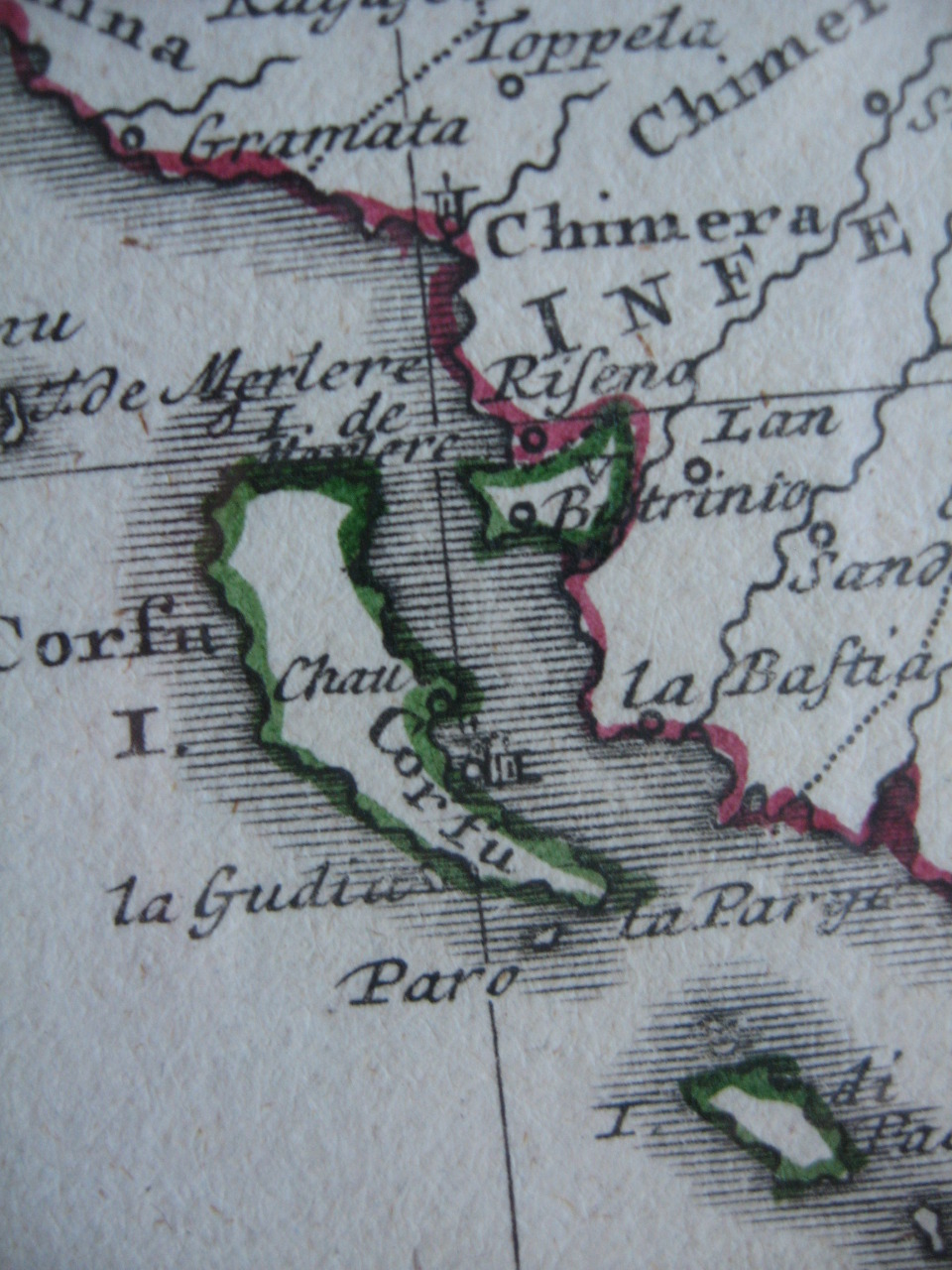
The Venetian Exclave surrounded by the Ottomans.

== See also ==
- Butrint
- Butrint National Park
- Venetian Acropolis Castle
- Lake Butrint
- Channel of Vivari
- List of castles in Albania
- Tourism in Albania
- History of Albania
