= Ksamil =

Ksamil Εξαμίλι
- Administrative unit
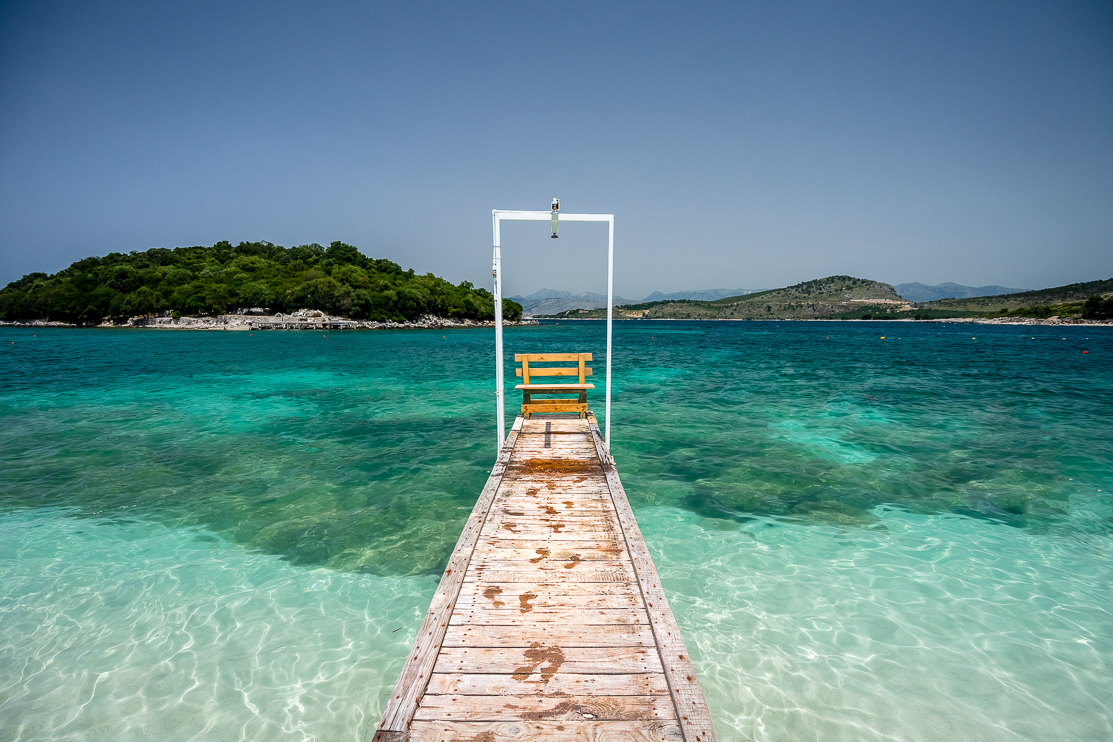
- Waters of Ksamil with its islets in the background

- Location within Albania
- Coordinates: 39°46′N 20°0′E
- Country: Albania
- County: Vlorë
- Municipality: Sarandë
  - Administrative unit: 12.39 km^{2} (4.78 sq mi)

Population (2023)
  - Administrative unit: 2,731
  - Administrative unit density: 220.4/km^{2} (570.9/sq mi)
- Time zone: UTC+1 (CET)
  - Summer (DST): UTC+2 (CEST)
- Postal Code: 9706
- Area Code: 893

Ksamil (Albanian: Ksamili; Greek: Εξαμίλι) is a village and a former municipality in the riviera of Southern Albania, and part of Butrint National Park. At the 2015 local government reform it became a subdivision of the municipality of Sarandë. The population as of the 2023 census is 2,731, while according to the Civil Offices it was 9,137 in 2018. The municipal unit consists of the villages Ksamil and Manastir. The coastal village of Ksamil was built during the communist era, in 1966, and is located south of Sarandë off the road to Butrint.

== Demographics ==
Historical population
Year	Pop.	±%
1989	1,852	—
2001	1,840	−0.6%
2011	2,994	+62.7%
2023	2,731	−8.8%

In 1992, the village of Ksamil was inhabited by a mixed population of Muslim Albanians (1,125), Greeks (520) and Orthodox Albanians (210).

According to official estimates (2014), the population of the commune of Ksamil numbered 9,215, of whom 4,207 were Greeks, seven Aromanians, and the rest Albanians.

== Tourist attractions ==
Ksamil is one of the most frequented coastal resorts by both domestic and foreign tourists. Ksamil Beach and Albania's Ionian Coast further north were included in the Guardian's 20 of the best bargain beach holidays for 2013. The main attractions are the nearby Ksamil Islands. The Caribbean white sand beaches in Ksamil gave the town a great tourism boost. Albanians from Kosovo and other Albanian-speaking areas visited Ksamil in recent years, but more and more international tourists are visiting the beach. This led, for example, to new hotel facilities, but also to more expensive prices. Other activities are the Blue Eye in Muzinë, the Butrint National Park, Saranda and as well some other minor beaches that lie north to Ksamil.

== Gallery ==
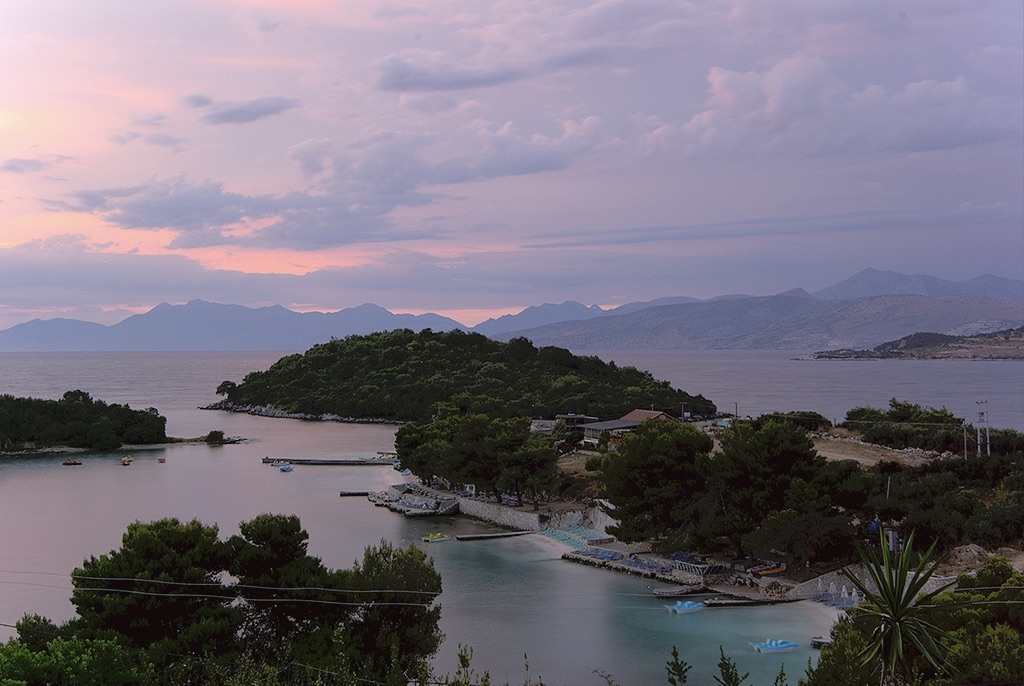

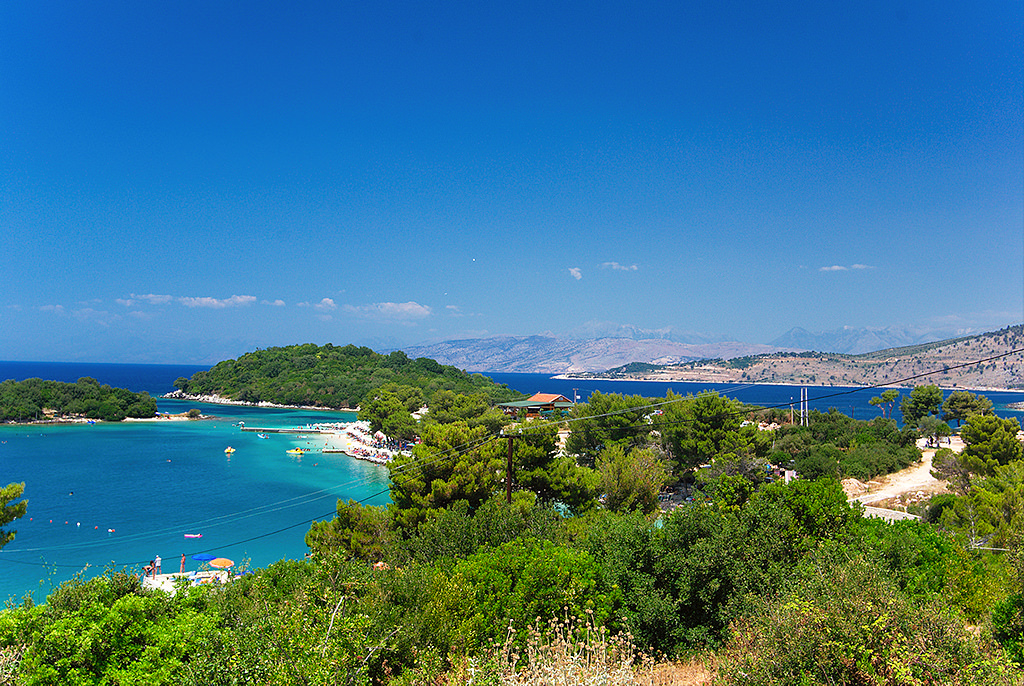

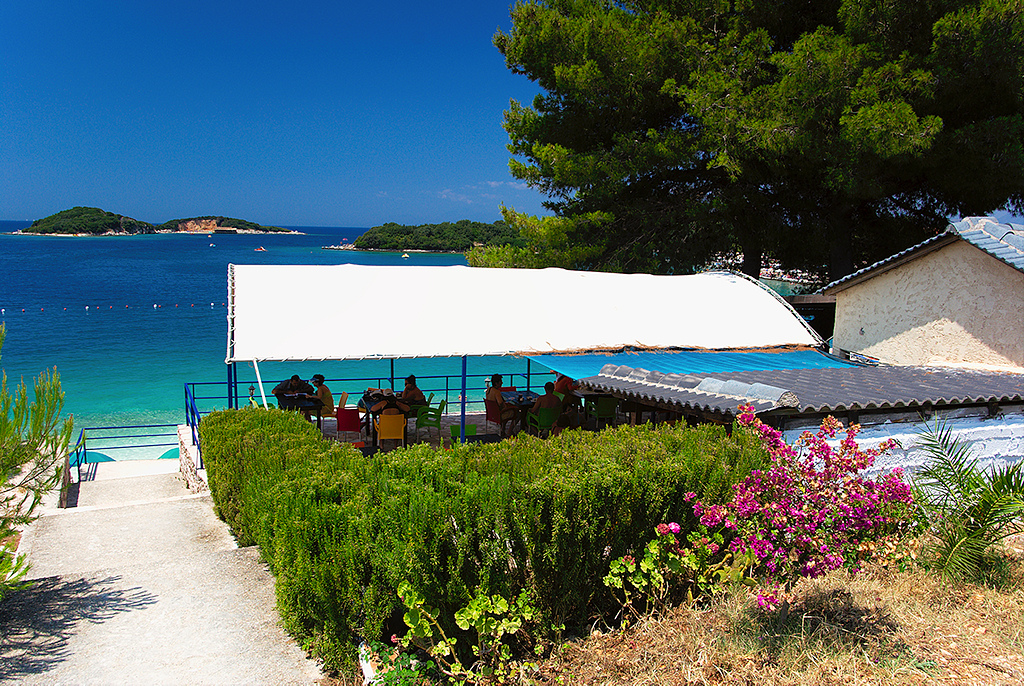

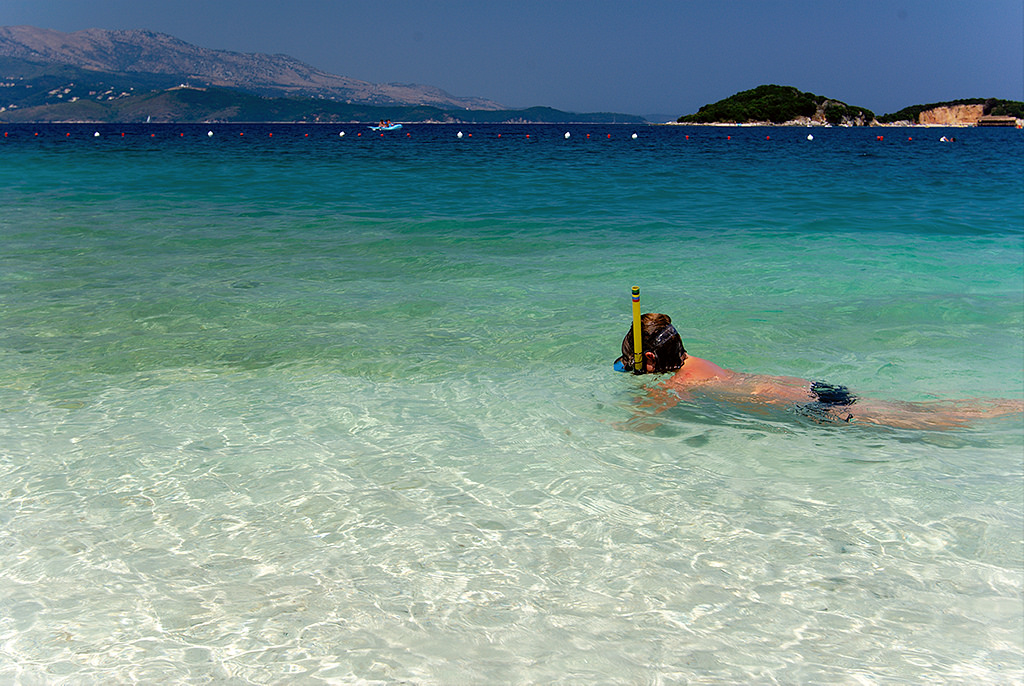

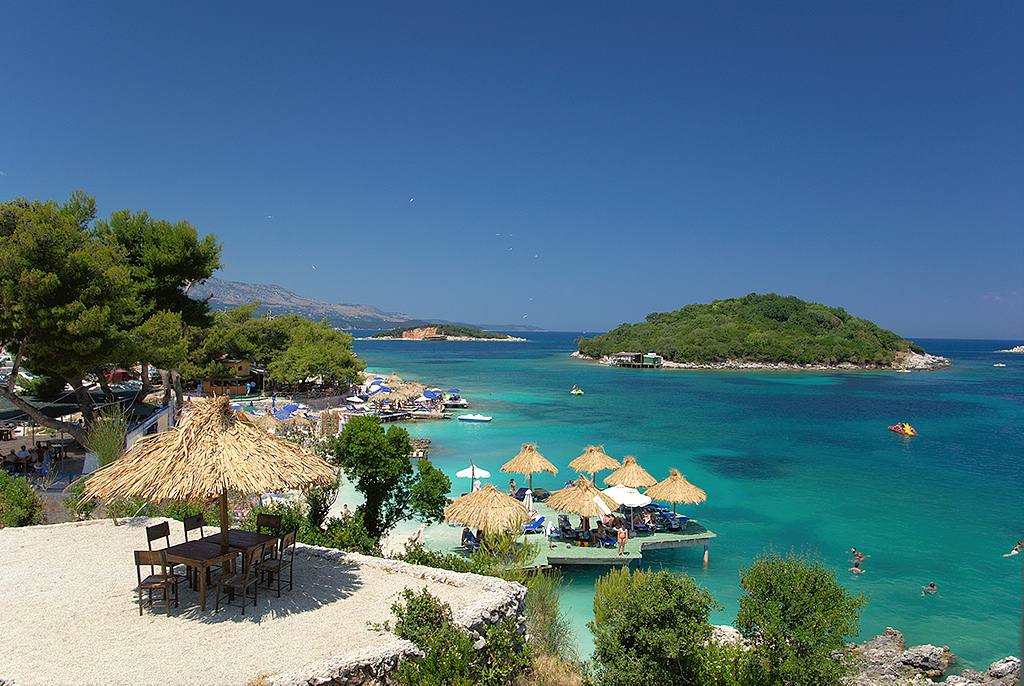

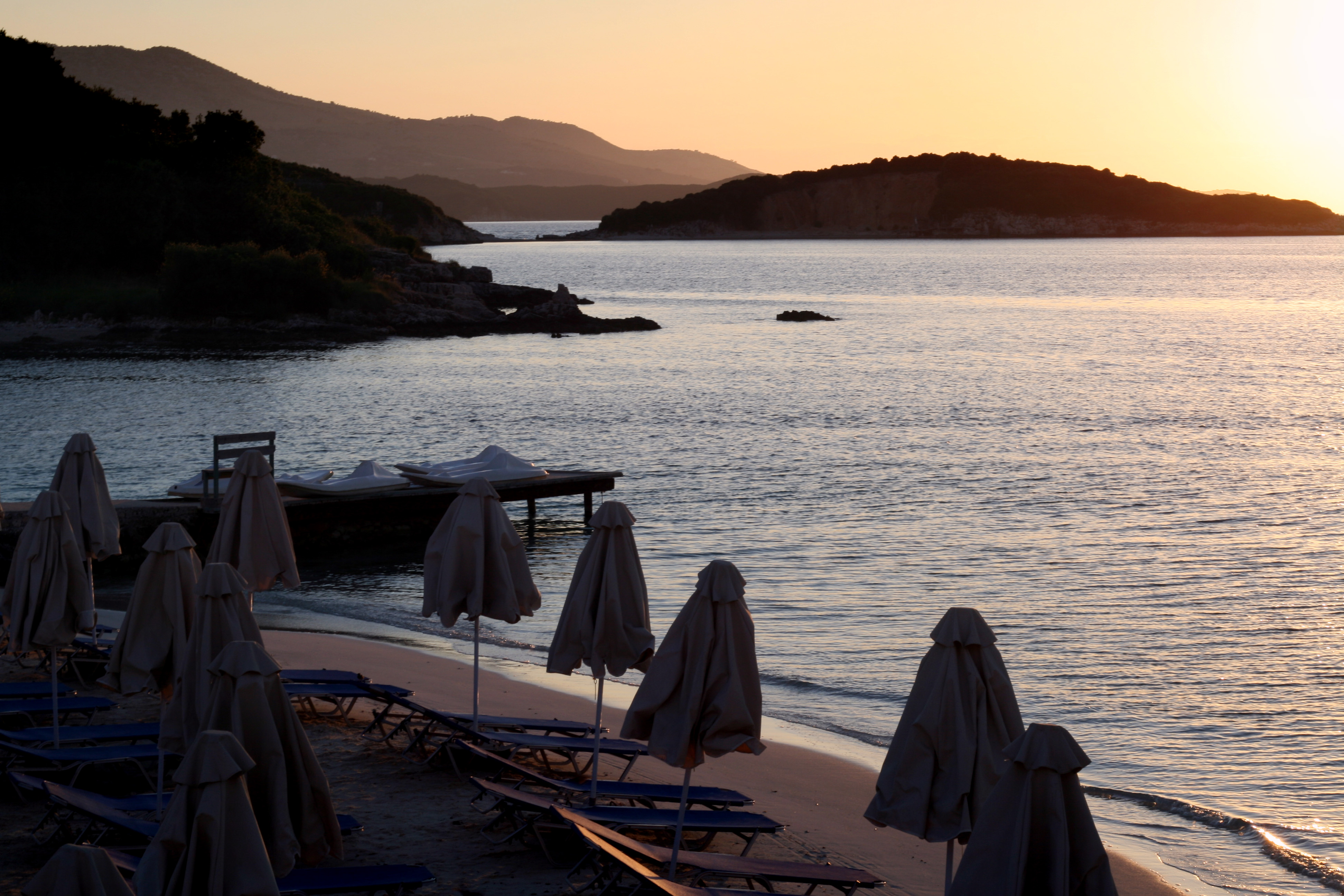

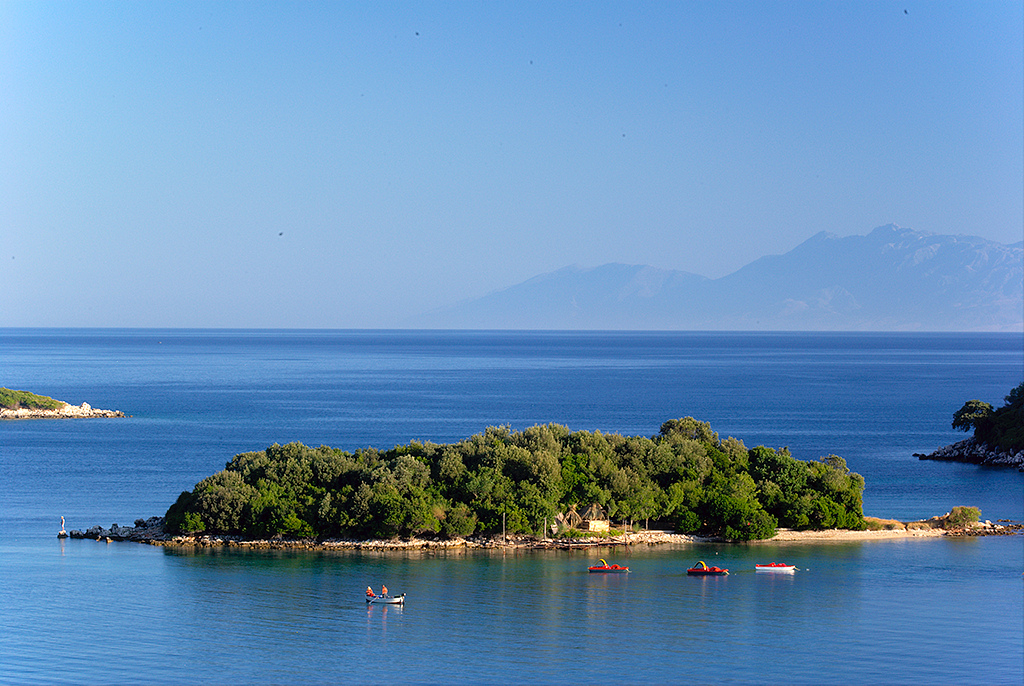

== See also ==
- Tourism in Albania
- Geography of Albania
- List of islands of Albania
