= Butrint National Park =

National park in Vlorë County, Albania

- Parku Kombëtar i Butrintit
- IUCN category II (national park)
- Official logo

- Location within Albania Location within Europe
- Location: Vlorë County
- Nearest city: Sarandë
- Coordinates: 39°44′51″N 20°1′13″E
- Area: 8,622.2 hectares (86.222 km^{2})
- Designated: 2 March 2000
- Governing body: National Agency of Protected Areas
- Website: www.butrint.al

Ramsar Wetland
- Official name: Butrint
- Designated: 28 March 2003
- Reference no.: 1290

UNESCO World Heritage Site
- Type: Cultural
- Criteria: iii
- Designated: 1992
- Reference no.: 570

Butrint National Park (Albanian: Parku Kombëtar i Butrintit) is a national park in Vlorë County, southern Albania. It is located 18 kilometres (11 mi) south of Sarandë. The park encompasses 9,424 hectares (94.24 km^{2}) of hilly terrain with freshwater lakes, wetlands, salt marshes, open plains, reed beds and islands. The park's significance for conservation is reflected in the large number of species with over 1,200 different animals and plants. Its mandate includes the protection of the lake and lagoon of Butrint, the natural channel of Vivari, the islands of Ksamil and as well the archaeological site, that provides valuable remains of ancient civilisations.

Butrint is strategically located in the eastern part of the Strait of Corfu in the extreme south of the country. It sprawls across a peninsula that is surrounded by Lake Butrint and Vivari Channel. The channel connects the lake to the Ionian Sea through a narrow sandy bar. Located in the direct proximity to the sea, the park experiences mild Mediterranean climate. This means that the winters are mild and the summers are hot and dry.

The archaeological heritage of Butrint is one of the most important archaeological sites in the country, containing different artefacts and structures, dating from the Iron Age up until the Middle Ages. Numerous monuments are still extant including the city walls, a late-antique baptistery, a great basilica, Roman theatre and two castles. The ancient city is situated within a natural woodland with a complex of ecosystems which depends on the nearby lake and channel. Nevertheless, it is this combination of cultural monuments and natural environment which makes Butrint such a unique place.

The International Union for Conservation of Nature (IUCN) has listed the park as Category II. In 1992, the archaeological site joined the UNESCO list of World Heritage Sites. The lagoon has been further recognized as a wetland of international importance by designation under the Ramsar Convention. Nevertheless, Lake Butrint is an Important Bird and Plant Area, because it abundant to significant bird and plant species of international importance.

== Administration ==
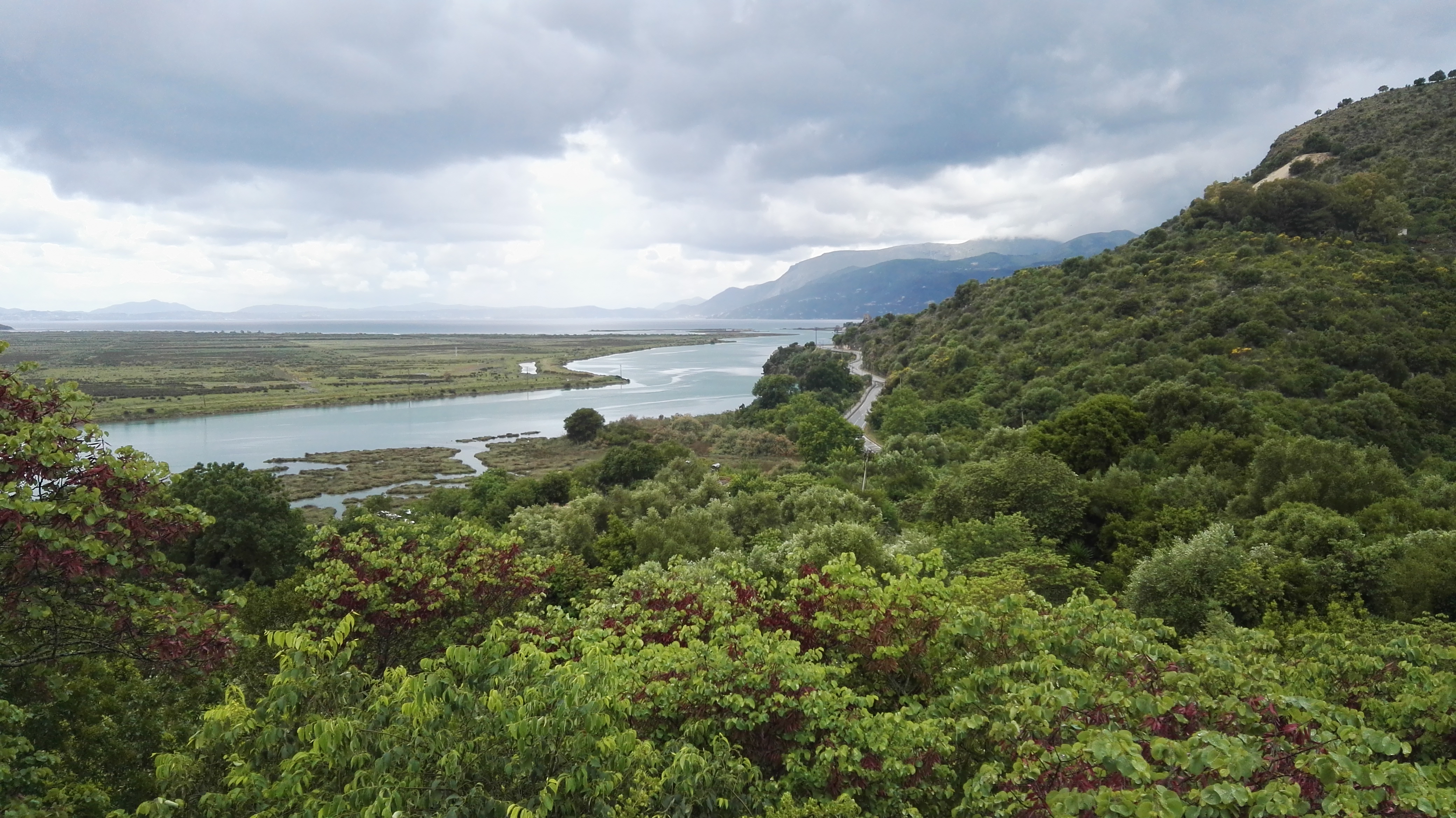
Typical habitat along Lake Butrint and Vivari Channel

The Butrint National Park was established with ordinance number 82 on 2 March 2000 in order to preserve the natural ecosystems and landscapes along with their plant and animal communities and habitats and the cultural heritage as well. The park's territory was expanded several times until it reached its current area, recently in 2005. It is managed by a directorate subordinated to the Ministry of Environment of Albania based in Sarandë. The park became an important centre of cultural management and a great example how to manage this heritage. With the support of Albanian institutions, Butrint Foundation, World Bank and UNESCO, the situation was improved to the point, that UNESCO removed the site from the World Heritage Sites in Danger list in 2005. The park was founded by the Ministry of Culture in partnership with UNESCO, ICCROM and ICOMOS. The underlying intention was to create a sustainable cultural heritage resource involving local communities and national institutions to serve as a model for other parks around the country.

Nowadays, it is now a major centre for archaeology and conservation training schools organised by the Butrint Foundation in partnership with the Albanian Institutes of Archaeology and Monuments, foreign universities and international specialists and consultants. There is an active program of events in the theatre, concerts and performances, and outreach programmes for local schools and colleges. In 2010, national authorities demolished over 200 illegal structures in Ksamil that violated the town's master plan and the integrity of Butrint National Park. The remains of the demolished buildings have yet to be removed by authorities.

== Geography ==
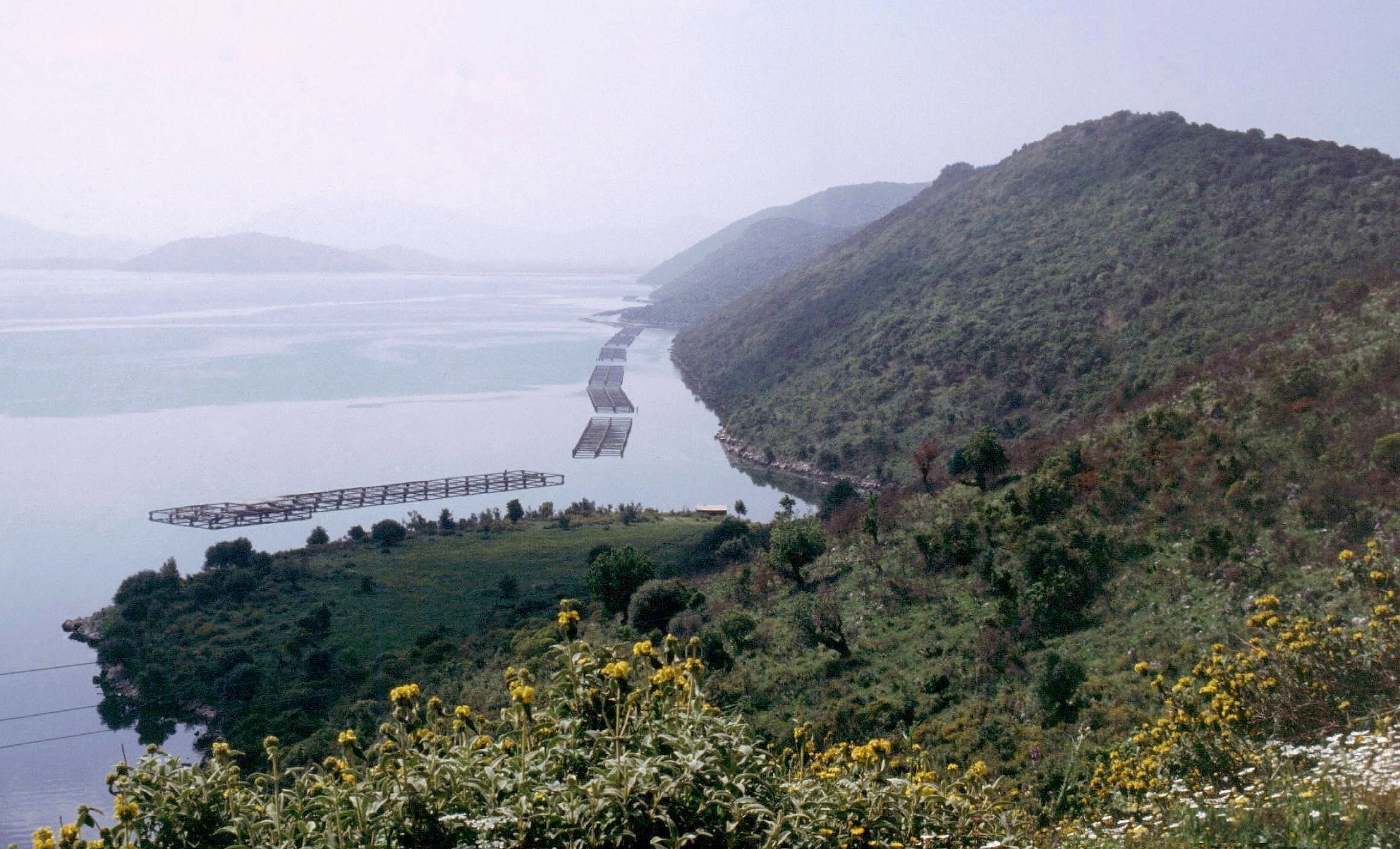
The Lake of Butrint makes up the core area of the Butrint National Park.

The Butrint National Park comprises 9,424.4 ha (94.244 km^{2}) in Vlorë County located in the southwestern corner of Albania alongside the Ionian Sea within the Mediterranean Basin. It lies mostly between latitudes 39° and 44° N and longitudes 20° and 1° E. By road, the remains of Butrint are some 18 kilometres (11 mi) south of the city of Sarandë and few kilometres north of the terrestrial border between Albania and Greece. According to the Köppen climate classification, the park experiences Mediterranean climate (Csa and Csb) with rainy winters and dry, warm to hot summers. Located in the south of the Albanian Ionian Sea Coast, the park receives 1,500 millimetres (59 in) of precipitation annually.

Butrint is part of a diverse hydrographical network, composed by the courses of several rivers, lagoons and lakes. The rivers are short, steep and characterised by high water volume. The park comprises Lake Butrint in the northwest, Lake Bufi in the southeast, Bistrica River in the north, Mile Mountain in the west and Pavllo River in the south.

Lake Butrint is the largest lake and its water regime is typical of a coastal lagoon. It has a length of 7.1 km (4.4 mi) and a width of 3.3 km (2.1 mi), with a surface area of 16.3 km^{2} (6.29 sq mi). Having mesotrophic waters with eutrophic tendencies, the limnology of the lake is divided into two distinct layers. The Vivari Channel connects the lake with the Ionian Sea. Lake Bufi lies about 2 m (0.0012 mi) above the Adriatic in the southeast of Lake Butrint, with a total surface area of 83 hectares (0.83 km^{2}). Its excessives waters are then discharged into the southern Lake Butrint through a former channel.

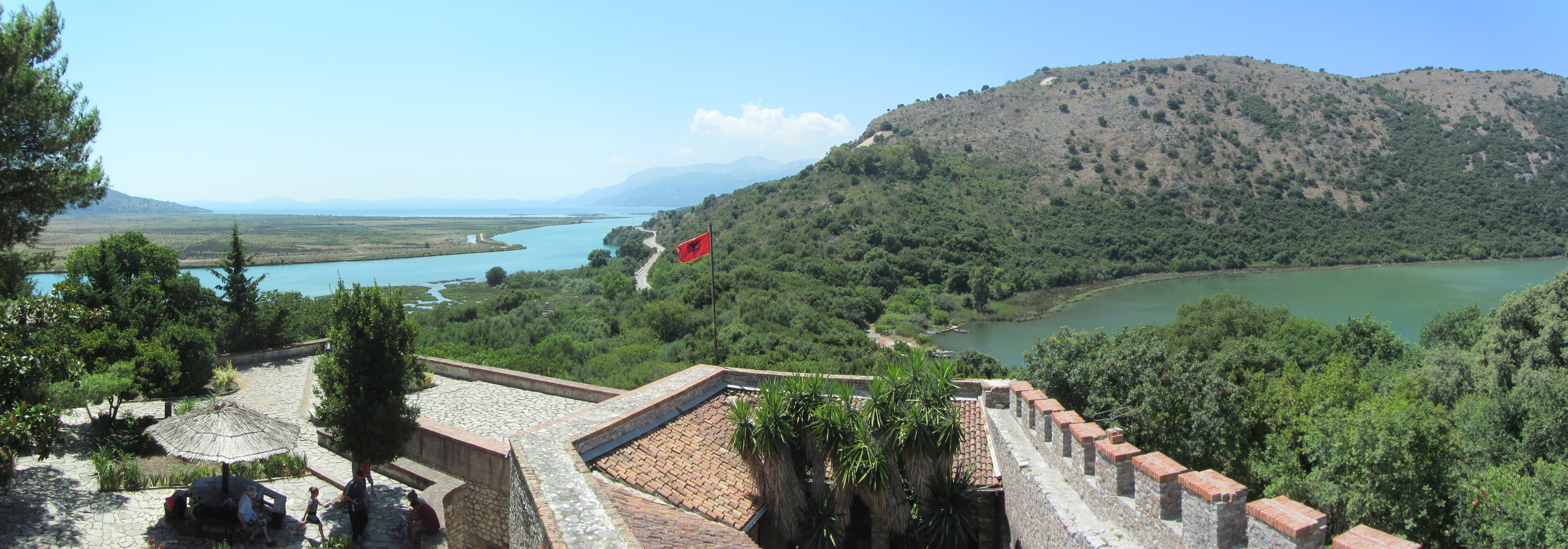
A panoramic view over the Lake Butrint and the Ionian Sea in distance

== Biodiversity ==
=== Flora ===
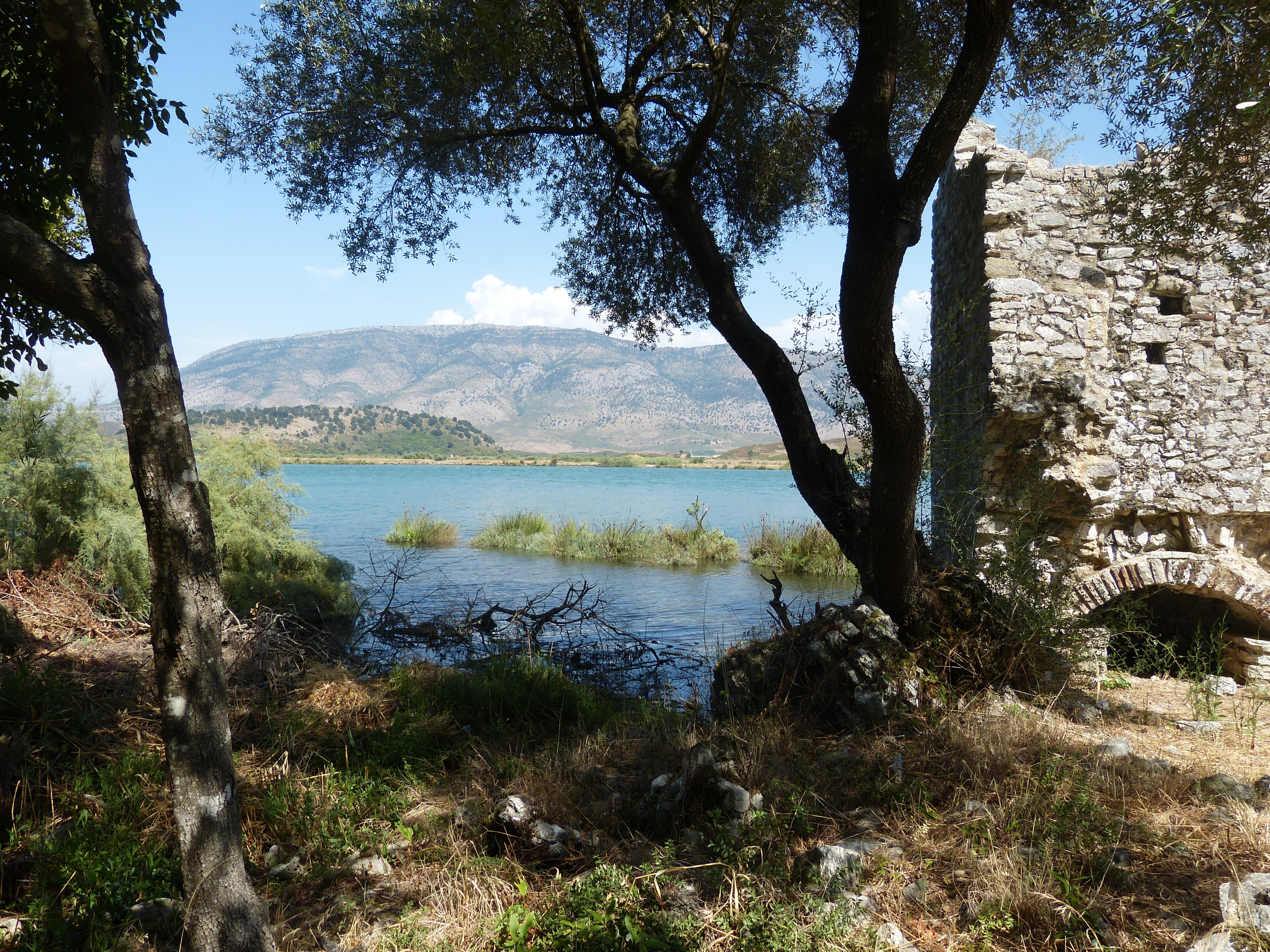
The central part of Lake Bufi is free of reed beds and a good sheltering and feeding site for various bird species.

Due to its diverse geological and hydrological conditions and the mosaic distribution of various types of habitats, the location of the park is also one of the main reasons for the great variety of animals and plants. The park falls phytogeographically within the Illyrian deciduous forests terrestrial ecoregion of the Palearctic Mediterranean forests, woodlands, and scrub. The availability of water in forms of rivers, lakes and wetlands, influenced by the configuration of the terrain, has a great impact on the biodiversity of this area. The vertebrate flora of the park consists of more than 800 up to 900 species, which constitute 27% of the total number of species in Albania.

The shallow coastal lagoons are rocky with extensive mussel beds and the water depth is higher than in other areas. They are covered with dense grasses of phragmites and typha latifolia. There are also underwater meadows dominated by zostera noltei and ruppia cirrhosa. Within the archaeological site and southern and eastern slopes of Sotira, Evergreen forests occupy's most of the area. Moreover, it is vertically divided into three distinct vegetation zones. The upper tree level is covered by holly oak and bay laurel, which prevail over the other plants including field elm, narrow-leafed ash and valonia oak. The scrubby level is represented with elmleaf blackberry, common hawthorn, evergreen rose, common ivy and italian leather flower. Moreover, the herbal level is dominated among other by wild asparagus, hedge bedstraw, lesser celandine and purple loosestrife.

Posidonia oceanica is mostly distributed along the littoral sea bottom, from the Stillo Cap to Cuka Channel, while cymodocea nodosa and zostera noltei are widely found along the mouth of Pavllo River. Along the cliffs, the salinity and rocky terrain have caused the decreased or poor the floristic composition. They are composed of species such as crithmum, elymus pycnanthus and golden samphire.

=== Fauna ===
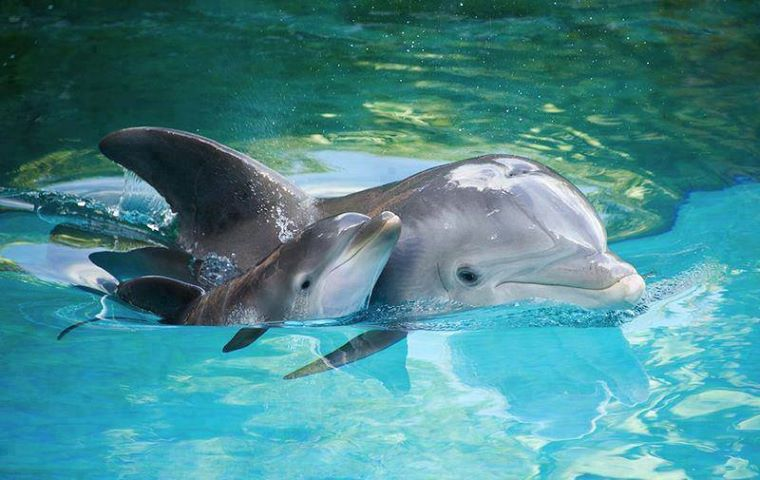
The common bottlenose dolphin is often seen in the waters of Butrint and one of the main attractions of the park.

The park contains a diverse assemblage of fauna with over 400 species distributed across the park's habitats and ecosystems. At least 39 species of mammals, 246 species of birds, 25 species of reptiles, 10 species of amphibia and 105 species of fish are known to occur within the park's boundaries.

The park's forests and shrublands provide an important refuge for 39 species of mammals of which 14 species are classified as globally endangered. The beech marten thrives in the edges of the woodlands, and open hillsides of the park. The golden jackal and red fox are typically to be found in the grasslands feeding primarily on small rodents, while the grey wolf occurs only during winter in the park. Outstanding is the presence of the otter, found in the streams and lakes, that is protected by international conventions.

The coastal waters around the park are frequented by dolphins such as the common bottlenose dolphin, short-beaked common dolphin and occasionally by the striped dolphin. The park provides one of the last remaining nesting habitat for the endangered mediterranean monk seal that is present in the rocks and caverns of the park. Sea turtles are not really that uncommon in the shallow coastal waters of the park. There are two species of sea turtles, such as the loggerhead sea turtle and leatherback sea turtle, that are listed as endangered or threatened by state authorities.

The park is rich in bird life with over 246 species living in different habitats throughout the territory. Many of these birds are residents and others are travellers passing through the Adriatic flyway. Most important bird inhabiting the park include the golden eagle, peregrine falcon, rock partridge, golden oriole and common buzzard. The bays and estuaries along the Ionian Sea Coast are a wintering destination for important birds. The wetlands serve as feeding and resting-places for the common pochard, great cormorant, great crested grebe, eurasian coot and black-headed gull. The reed beds are used by common moorhen, water rail, hen harrier, western marsh harrier, moustached warbler and remiz pendulinus. The marshes offer feeding sites for the little egret, grey plover, european golden plover and dunlin. Most of the waterbirds are concentrated in the coastal marshes such as the eurasian curlew, common redshank and sandwich tern.

10 species of amphibians are documented, although those species exist in large numbers, mostly inhabiting the forests and bushes. The most common species of amphibians include the fire salamander, northern crested newt, common toad and greek stream frog. The reptile diversity at Butrint is also rich, higher than any other protected area in the region. A total of 25 species have been inventoried. They are represented by balkan green lizard, slowworm and aesculapian snake.

In regard to the sea, the park's bodies of water are frequented by 105 species of fish. The most abundant species include the flathead grey mullet, thinlip mullet, thicklip grey mullet, european eel, european hake and crucian carp.

== Attractions ==
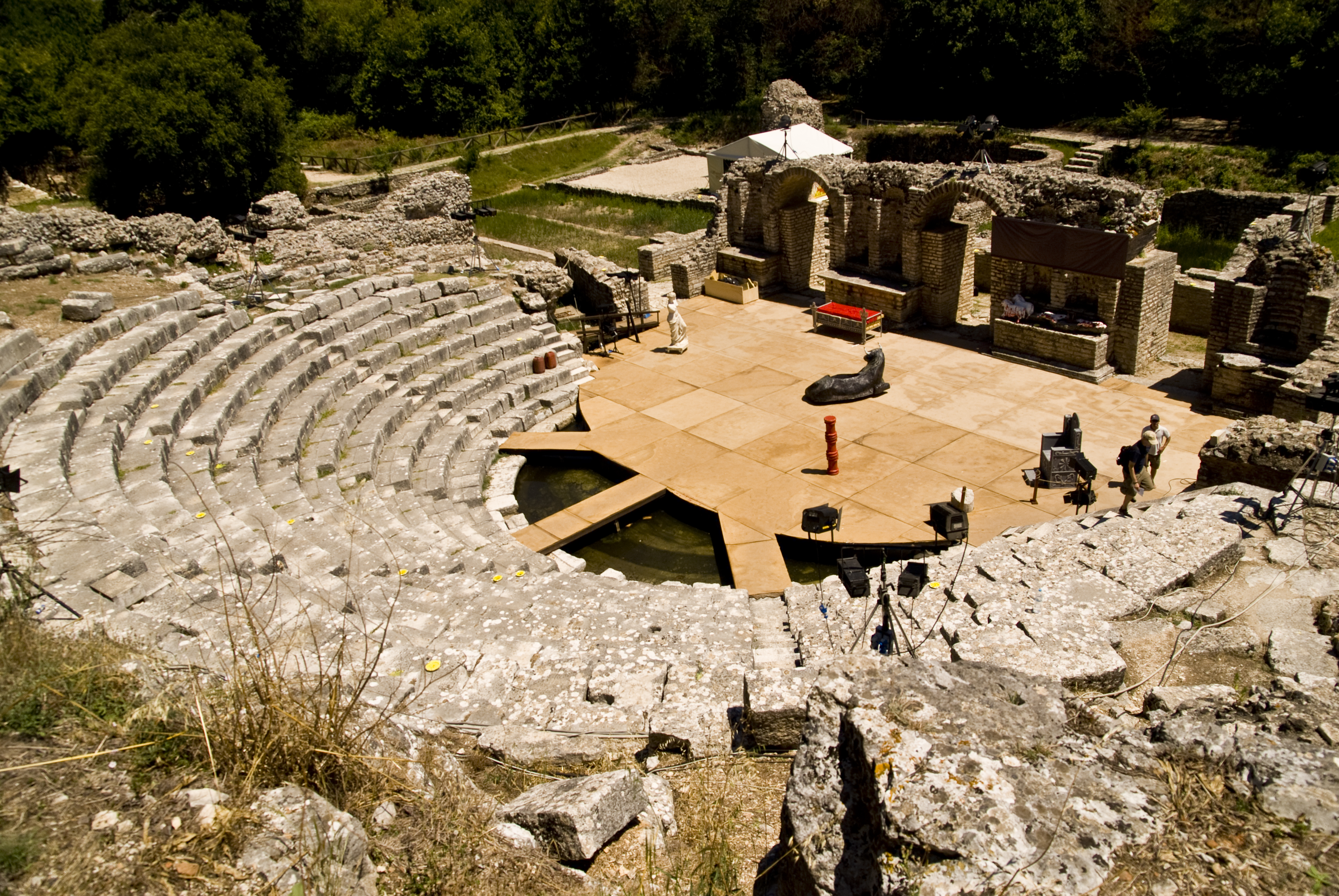
The theatre of Butrint with its Proscenium

The rich history of Butrint has left important vestiges across the territory of the park. The principal architectural monuments in the park includes a Roman theatre, Dionysus altar, Nymphaeum, Thermae, Gymnasium, Forum, Aqueduct, the temples of Minerva and Asclepius, the Lion Gate and a Baptistery situated in Southern Albania and declared a UNESCO's World Heritage Site in 1992.

The Roman theatre of Butrint is among the best preserved buildings of the town. It is located just below the Acropolis and facing out over the Vivari Channel. The theatre was built in the 3rd century BC, possibly on the walls of an older and smaller theatre. During the Roman period, it underwent many renovations and extensions. They built boxes for the upper-class above the two entrances of the theatre. The auditorium was also enlarged to accommodate the growing population of the town at that time.

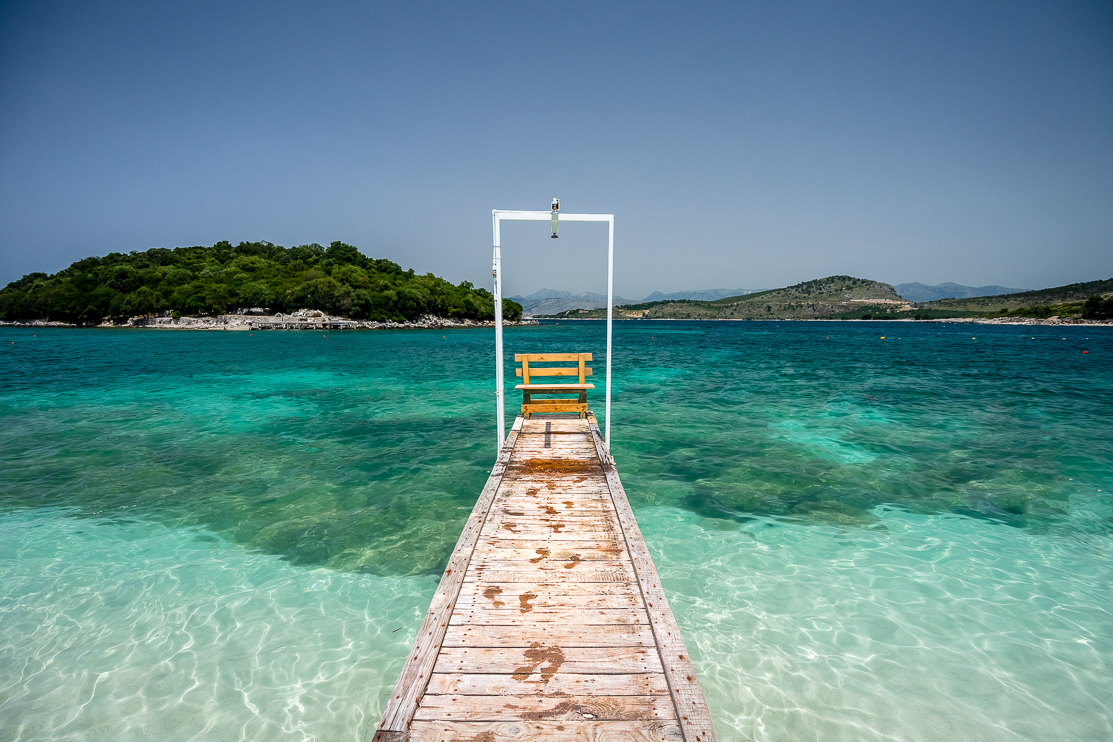
Ksamil Islands in Ksamil are part of the national park coverage area.

The Castle of Ali Pasha Tepelena lies within a small island along the mouth of the Vivari Channel and is named after the Albanian ruler Ali Pasha of Ioannina, who ruled over the Pashalik of Yanina and even attempted to rival the Dey of Algiers in the seas. The castle is a small rectangular structure with battered walls. Along the corners, there are two battered round towers with cannons on its seaward side and two irregularly sized battered square towers equipped with firing loops or windows.

Another major attraction is the Lion Gate and one of the six entrances to the city from the 4th century BC. The inscriptions shows a lion, that is about to eat a bull. The lion symbolises the inhabitants of the city and the bull as their enemies. The gate has a very narrow passage to allow as few people as possible to enter at the same time.

In the west of the park, there sprawls the rocky Islands of Ksamil that are remote and can only be accessed by boat. Although, two of the islands are connected by a narrow strip of sand. Dolphins such as the short-beaked common dolphin and common bottlenose dolphin are often seen in the waters.

== See also ==
- Venetian Acropolis Castle
- Venetian Triangular Castle
- Butrinti
- Lake Butrint
- Channel of Vivari
- Protected areas of Albania
- List of national parks in Albania
