= HMS Volage (R41) =

V-class destroyer converted to Type 15 frigate of the Royal Navy

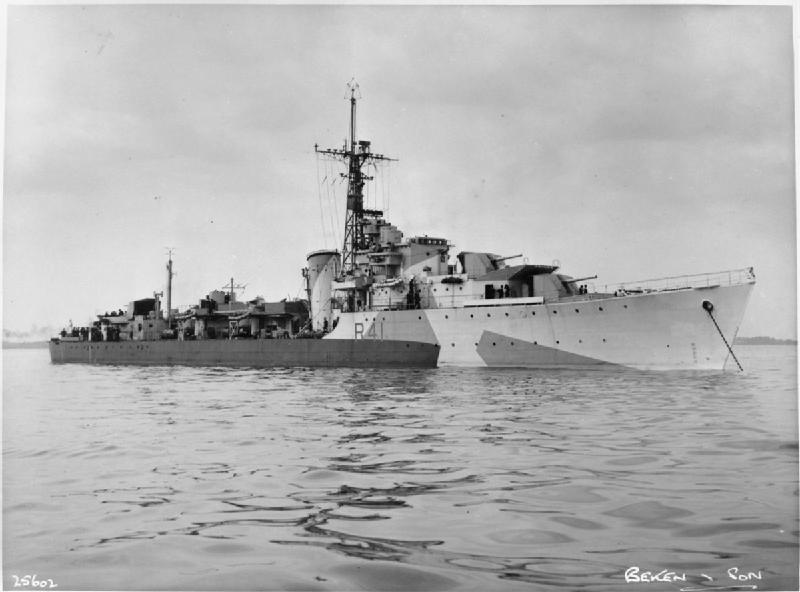
- HMS Volage in May 1944

History

United Kingdom
- Name: Volage
- Ordered: 1 September 1941
- Builder: J. Samuel White
- Laid down: 31 December 1942
- Launched: 15 February 1943
- Commissioned: 26 May 1944
- Decommissioned: 1956
- Identification: Pennant number R41/F41
- Honours and awards: Arctic 1944; East Indies 1945
- Fate: Sold 28 October 1972; scrapped by Pounds at Portsmouth 1977
- Badge: "On a Field White, a Red Admiral butterfly Proper"

General characteristics V-class destroyer
- Class & type: V-class destroyer
- Displacement: 1,777 long tons (1,806 t) standard; 2,058 long tons (2,091 t) full load
- Length: 363 ft (111 m)
- Beam: 35 ft 8 in (10.87 m)
- Draught: 10 ft (3.0 m)
- Propulsion: 2 × Admiralty 3-drum water-tube boilers; Geared steam turbines, 40,000 shp (29,828 kW); 2 shafts
- Speed: 37 knots (43 mph; 69 km/h)
- Range: 4,860 nmi (9,000 km) at 29 kn (54 km/h)
- Complement: 180 (225 in flotilla leader)
- Armament: Original configuration : 4 × QF 4.7-inch (120-mm) Mk XII guns in single mountings CP Mk.XXII; 2 × QF 40 mm Bofors guns in twin mount Mk.IV; 6 × QF 20 mm Oerlikon guns; 2 × twin mounts Mk.V, 2 × single mounts Mk.III; 2 × quadruple tubes for 21 in (533 mm) torpedo Mk.IX

General characteristics Type 15 frigate
- Class & type: Type 15 frigate
- Displacement: 2,300 long tons (2,337 t) standard
- Length: 358 ft (109 m) o/a
- Beam: 37 ft 9 in (11.51 m)
- Draught: 14 ft 6 in (4.42 m)
- Propulsion: 2 × Admiralty 3-drum boilers, steam turbines on 2 shafts, 40,000 shp
- Speed: 31 knots (36 mph; 57 km/h) (full load)
- Complement: 174
- Sensors & processing systems: Radar; Type 293Q target indication (later Type 993); Type 277Q surface search; Type 974 navigation; Type 262 fire control on director CRBF; Type 1010 Cossor Mark 10 IFF; Sonar: Type 174 search; Type 162 target classification; Type 170 attack
- Armament: 1 × twin 4 in gun Mark 19; 1 × twin 40mm Bofors Mk.5; 2 × Squid A/S mortar or; 2 × Limbo Mark 10 A/S mortar

HMS Volage was a V-class destroyer of the British Royal Navy, commissioned on 26 May 1944, that served in the Arctic and the Indian Oceans during World War II. She was the fifth Royal Naval ship to bear the name (a sixth was planned during World War I as a modified V-class destroyer but the order was cancelled in 1918).

She was ordered on 1 September 1941 as part of the 8th Emergency flotilla and fitted for Arctic service.

On 22 October 1946, Volage and the destroyer HMS Saumarez were badly damaged by mines laid in the North Corfu Channel. She was subsequently rebuilt as a Type 15 fast anti-submarine frigate, with the new pennant number "F41", during 1952–53, and scrapped in 1972.

== Second World War service ==
=== Home Fleet ===
Volage completed her trials and she was commissioned on 26 May 1944 into the 26th Destroyer Flotilla (26DF) (Note: 26th Destroyer Flotilla was established with V-class destroyers: Hardy (leader), Valentine, Venus, Verulam, Vigilant, Virago, Vixen and Volage.) of the Home Fleet. She joined the Fleet at Scapa Flow and commenced active service on August with her flotilla on an exercise for a planned operation (Operation Offspring) off Norway. (During one exercise, oiling from the battleship HMS Howe, the two ships locked together and Volage suffered superficial damage.) On 10 August, 26DF escorted other warships (Note: Offspring included aircraft carriers Indefatigable, Trumpeter, Nabob and cruisers Kent and Devonshire.) for air attacks on shipping and shore targets between the islands of Lepsøya and Haramsøya in Norway.

From 17 to 23 September, Volage joined the screen for a strong force (Note: Escort for JW60 and RA60 consisted of battleship Rodney, cruiser Diadem, aircraft carriers Campania and Striker screened by destroyers Marne, Meteor, Musketeer, Saumarez, Scorpion, Venus, Verulam, Virago and Volage.) providing cover for Convoy JW60, en route to Kola Inlet, northern Russia and repeated the role for the return convoy RA60 to Loch Ewe between 29 September and 3 October. The escort had been assembled in case of attack by the German battleship Tirpitz but Tirpitz had been disabled by an air attack some days before and the outward passage was uneventful. On the return, however, two merchant ships were lost to the German submarine U-310.

During the rest of October 1944, Volage was included in the escort for aircraft carriers on two anti-shipping and one reconnaissance operation off Norway.

=== Indian Ocean ===
As the surface naval threat in western Europe had greatly reduced with the sinking, in November 1944, of Tirpitz, Royal Naval units were transferred to the far East to confront the Japanese. The 26DF, including Volage, was consequently nominated for service with the Eastern Fleet in the Indian Ocean. She was refitted in Leith for foreign service and subsequently arrived at Trincomalee in February 1945.

Towards the end of the month, on 24 September, Volage was part of the escort for aircraft carriers on an air photo-reconnaissance of the Malacca Straits. The opportunity was taken en route to bombard targets in the Andaman Islands (Operation Stagey). (Note: The force for Operation Stagey included aircraft carriers Empress, Ameer, cruiser Kenya, destroyers Vigilant, Virago and frigates.)

On 14 March, Volage, and the destroyers Saumarez and Rapid formed Force 70 for a reconnaissance of Langkawi Sound and sailed for the Malacca Straits (Operation Transport). The reconnaissance task was abandoned soon after and, instead, Force 70 patrolled for enemy shipping. The British ships bombarded the railway works at Sigli, on Sumatra, on 17 March and resuming their anti-shipping sweep, without success, off the Nicobar Islands.

Force 70 arrived off the Andamans on 19 March with the intent of entering the natural harbour at Port Blair and attacking any shipping found there. Volage had developed engine defects which limited her to the use of only one propeller shaft and consequentially she remained offshore, firing air bursts over the shore batteries. Rapid was hit by 6 inch fire from shore batteries shortly after entered the harbour, disabled and unable to make headway. Volage was also hit and briefly disabled by shore fire while Rapid was being towed to safety by Saumarez; three of Volage's ratings were killed and another eight wounded. All three ships of Force 70 reached Akyab under their own power.

On 25 March, Force 70, now consisting of Saumarez, Virago, Vigilant and Volage sailed on an anti-shipping sweep between the Andamans and the Malayan coast (Operation On Board). Next day, Force 70 located and attacked an enemy convoy (Note: Combinedfleet.com records that sub-chasers CH-63 and CH-34 escorted two storeships, Teshio Maru and Risui Maru, that were carrying food for the Japanese garrisons on the Andaman and Nicobar islands. No mention of another two transports.) of four transports escorted by two Japanese anti-submarine vessels that were en route from Singapore to Port Blair with supplies, troops and "comfort women". Ships' gunfire and torpedoes were used without success (Note: In this action, Force 70 expended 18 torpedoes and 3,160 rounds of QF 4.7-inch (120-mm) Mark IX gunsin ammunition. The action was later described by the Senior Officer as exasperatingly unsatisfactory.) until Liberator aircraft, from No. 222 Group RAF, provided support. The four transports were then sunk by a series of air and surface attacks, during which one Liberator crashed. There were 52 Japanese survivors taken prisoner from the convoy and delivered to Trincomalee on 28 March.

During April, Volage was used in convoy protection and the interception of the supply ships for the force of German u-boats operating in the Indian Ocean. She then sailed to Durban for refit, removal of Arctic fittings and enhancement of her radar and other detection equipment. She did not rejoin her flotilla until July and so missed the successful action against the Japanese cruiser Haguro.

In August, prior to the Japanese surrender, Volage prepared to support the planned landings in Malaya (Operation Zipper). Zipper was scaled down after the sudden surrender of Japan and the Volage was tasked under Operation Jurist to recapture Penang. She was part of the screen for capital ships of the East Indies Fleet sailing to Penang and later (31 August), she sailed from Trincomalee to join the naval forces for the re-occupation of Penang.

According to a crew member, John Mills, Volage was the first Allied ship into Penang and the local Japanese surrender was made on the dockside nearby. When Admiral Lord Louis Mountbatten, Commander-in-Chief, South East Asia Command, and General Bill Slim, C in C of 14th Army, passed through Penang en route to Singapore for the Japanese surrender in the East Indies, they spent a brief period on Volage and Mountbatten addressed the ship's crew.

Volage stayed at Penang into September as radio ship until shore facilities had been established and then supported the landings at Port Dickson.

== Postwar service ==
Volage returned to Trincomalee for local duties and subsequently departed for service in the 3rd Destroyer Flotilla, with the Mediterranean Fleet in Malta. She also served with the British Mandate in Palestine. Footage of her in action against illegal Jewish immigrants in December 1947 appears in Chris Marker's 1960 documentary Description of a Struggle. On 22 October 1946, she struck a mine in the Corfu Channel, close to Albania (at a time of mutual suspicion) and lost her bow section as far as "A" turret (see section below). She was repaired in Malta, returned to Britain in 1949 and went into Reserve.

She underwent major conversion work at the Chatham Dockyard during 1952–1953 to become a Type 15 anti-submarine frigate, rejoined the Fleet in 1954 (with a new pennant number, F41) and served in the Dartmouth Training Squadron for two years. In 1956 she went into Reserve for a second time, at Portsmouth and in 1964 she was used for the harbour training of Royal Marines.

Volage was never re-commissioned. She was placed on the disposal list and sold to Harry Pounds on 28 October 1972 and towed to Pounds breakers' yard at Tipner later that year.

=== Corfu Channel Mining ===
After steaming from Corfu at 13:30 on 22 October 1946, the destroyers Saumarez and Volage and the cruisers Mauritius and Leander approached Kepi Denta (Denta Point) at the southern edge of the Bay of Saranda. At 14:47, the lead ship, Mauritius signalled a port turn and a new course of 310 degrees. A reconstructed track course in Leggett (1976:36) depicts the turn outside the bay while Meçollari (2009:96–99) reconstructs the turn past the point and inside the bay. At 14:53, while underway on this new course, Saumarez struck a mine, later determined to be a German EMC (GY in British nomenclature) contact mine of Second World War manufacture. The EMC was a spherical weapon 44 in (1.12 m) in diameter with seven Hertz horns (a German-invented chemical detonator that closed the circuit for firing) with a charge of 661 lbs (300 kg) (Campbell 1985:270). The blast occurred a few feet forward of the bridge on the starboard side, opening an approximately "thirty-foot section…from the keel to just below the bridge" to the sea (Leggett 1976:35). Saumarez stopped and began to drift, with a fire from spilled fuel engulfing the bow area as the bow, flooded from the explosion damage, settled beneath the surface. Volage approached to assist and take Saumarez in tow. After one failed attempt (the line parted) a new towline was secured and Volage proceeded to tow Saumarez at 15:30 (Leggett 1976:60–61).

At 16:06 (or 16:15, according to Leggett), Volage struck a second mine. That mine was also later determined to be a German-manufactured EMC. Volage reportedly hit the mine head on; "In a split second forty feet of the destroyer, from the fore peak to just in front of 'A' gun turret, had vanished. Mess decks, store rooms, the paint shop, the cable locker containing tons of anchor cable, the anchors themselves, literally dissolved in the air" (Leggett 1976:71–72). Fragments of the bow were observed flying into the air, and other fragments, "some weighing up to half a ton" landed on the ship, some on to the bridge (Leggett 1976:72). Leggett (36) and Meçollari (96–99) chart the site of Volage's mining off the north point of the Bay of Saranda. As previously noted, despite their damage, both destroyers remained afloat, and subsequently returned to Corfu under tow. Saumarez suffered 36 dead, 25 of whom were missing and presumed killed, while Volage lost eight men, seven of whom were missing, presumed killed (Leggett 1976:154–155).

Following the Corfu Channel Incident, both destroyers reached Corfu, and subsequently were sent to Malta. No known attempt was made to salvage or recover material from the bow of Volage, which sank at the site of the mine explosion. Saumarez was written off as a constructive loss and sold on 8 September 1950, and was reported scrapped in October 1950.

=== Discovery of remains of Volage's bow in 2009 ===
In July 2007, the RPM Nautical Foundation, a U.S. and Malta-based not-for-profit organization, began a comprehensive, ongoing archaeological survey of the coast of Albania in cooperation with the Albanian Institute of Archaeology (AIA) and the Institute of Nautical Archaeology (INA). The inaugural season, conducted from the R/V Hercules, involved a multibeam sonar survey with remotely operated vehicle (ROV) assessment of targets to the 120 m contour. The area surveyed was from the border with Greece, through the Corfu Channel (but not into Greek waters) and to the Bay of Saranda, 21 kilometers from the border. A total of 125 anomalies were encountered, and 67 were assessed with the ROV during the 2007 season. The majority of anomalies were found to be geological mud and mud/sand formations. Fifteen shipwrecks were identified, fourteen of which were classified as "modern" and one of which was an ancient wreck of ca. 300–275 BCE. One of the fourteen other targets, briefly examined in 2007, was later (2009) determined to be the bow of Volage.

During the 2009 field season the sonar target in this area was re-examined by James P. Delgado of the Institute of Nautical Archaeology, Auron Tare of The Albanian Center for Marine Research ROV specialist Kim Wilson, and George Robb, Jr., President and founder of the RPM Nautical Foundation, who immediately assessed the potential of the 2007 "wreck" as the possible bow of Volage in response to Delgado’s question of whether the surveys of 2007–09 had encountered any traces of the Corfu Channel Incident.

The site is located in the area of the mining of Volage. The seabed is a loose mud and silt. The sonar anomaly delineated by multibeam in 2007 and reconfirmed in 2009 is approximately 15 by 10 meters in area and has a height of 1.5 meters above the current level of the seabed. Active siltation and burial of the vessel remains at the site is visible. Some localized scouring and uncovering of cultural material is also possible. The majority of the remains visible were a section of a steel ship's hull, with explosion damage consistent with an implosion, exposed steel frames, electrical wiring, and a series of diagnostic artefacts. While identification of the site would have been better aided by the recovery of one or more diagnostic artefacts, because of the possibility of the site being the bow of Volage and hence a war grave, no disturbance was planned and nothing was disturbed or removed from the site. The British and Albanian governments were notified of the find and provided with video and still images of the site after the survey.

The matter was taken further by Albanian scholar Auron Tare who did a research study in the British archives. After 6 months of research in London he discovered the File of the Corfu Channel Incident as well as the famous documents XCU and XCU 1. According to the File the scholars concluded that Volage and the other vessels were taking part of a military operation and not on an "innocent passage".

== Bibliography ==
- Burt, R.A (1985). British Destroyers in World War Two. London: Arms and Armour Press.
- Campbell, John (1985). Naval Weapons of World War II. London: Conway Maritime Press.
- Chesneau, Roger (1980). Conway's All The World's Fighting Ships 1922–1946. Annapolis: U.S. Naval Institute Press.
- Colledge, J. J.; Warlow, Ben (2006) [1969]. Ships of the Royal Navy: The Complete Record of All Fighting Ships of the Royal Navy from the 15th Century to the Present (3rd Rev ed.). London: Chatham Publishing. ISBN 978-1-86176-281-8. OCLC 67375475.
- Gardiner, Leslie (1966). The Eagle Spreads Its Claws: A History of the Corfu Channel Incident and of Albania's Relations With the West, 1945–1966. Edinburgh: William Blackwood.
- "Final Judgment, United Kingdom of Great Britain and Northern Ireland v. Albania (Corfu Channel Case), December 15" (PDF). International Court of Justice. 1949. Archived from the original (PDF) on 31 October 2008.
- Kola, Paulin (2003). The Search for Greater Albania. London: Hurst & Company.
- Ana Lalag, Burning Secrets of the Corfu Channel Incident, Cold War International History Project (CWIHP) Working Paper No. 70, September 2014.
- Leggett, Eric (1976). The Corfu Channel Incident. London: New English Library.
- Manning, T.D. (1961). The British Destroyer. London: Putnam & Co.
- Meçollari, Artur (2009). Incidenti I Kanalit Të Korfuzit: Dresjtësi e Annuar. Vlorë: Triptik.
- Raven, Alan; Roberts, John (1978). War Built Destroyers O to Z Classes. London: Bivouac Books. ISBN 0-85680-010-4.
- Thomson, Stuart (2005). "Maritime Jurisdiction and the Law of the Sea". In Speller, Ian (ed.). The Royal Navy and Maritime Power in the Twentieth Century. London and New York: Frank Cass.
- Whitley, M. J. (1988). Destroyers of World War 2. Annapolis, Maryland: Naval Institute Press. ISBN 0-87021-326-1.
