= Auron Tare =

Albanian historian and journalist (born 1968)

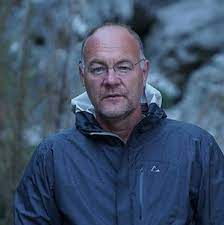
- Born: 21 October 1968 (age 57)
- Education: Military Academy of Tirana; Institute of Physical Education; Researcher at Utica College, Syracuse University
- Occupations: Activist, founder, journalist
- Spouse: Nancy Tare
- Children: 3

Auron Tare (born 21 October 1968) is an Albanian historian, journalist and cultural heritage manager. He was a founder of the Albanian National Coastal Agency and its First Director (Agjencia Kombëtare e Bregdetit). He was a member of Parliament for Tirana and a member of the Media and Cultural Committee for the Albanian Parliament for the legislation 2009-2013. In May 2018, he was elected chairman of UNESCO Scientific and Technical Committee on Underwater World Heritage. Auron Tare is a well-known public figure in the field of Albanian cultural heritage, government, and journalism and explorations. Championing the cause of cultural preservation, Tare has worked for many years mobilizing support for the preservation of Albania's rich historical background. He is well known for his efforts to protect the ancient city of Butrint in the mid-1990s, when Albania was going through difficult economic and political transitions. He was one of the founders of Butrint National Park and its first director from 1999 to 2005. Auron Tare was for several years the Albanian representative of Butrint Foundation and charity founded by Lord Rothschild and Lord Sainsbury of Preston Candover. Tare's many duties have included work with many international organizations such as UNESCO, the World Bank, the Ramsar Convention, the Butrint Foundation, Oak Foundation, Mifflin Trust, National Geographic, USAID, SIDA, World Mate, and the Italian Trust for Culture for the improvement of Albania's cultural heritage.

== Background ==
=== Under communist rule, 1968–1990 ===
Born during the communist era, Tare followed his family tradition and was educated at the Military Academy of Tirana. Tare graduated from the Skanderbeg Military Academy of Tirana and the Institute of Physical Culture in Tirana, where he played basketball for the Albanian team Partizani. Continuing post-graduation to play for Partizani on the national team, Tare garnered nationwide fame, but would remain a familiar face on television for his later work in the humanities.

==== Post-communism, 1990–1994 ====
After the fall of communism, Tare became a member of the British Channel 4 television team, covering civil unrest in Albania in 1997 as well as the Kosovo and Macedonia Wars of 1998–1999. In 1995, he founded a boutique travel company called Our Own Expeditions, which specializes in taking foreigners along the undiscovered trails of Albania.

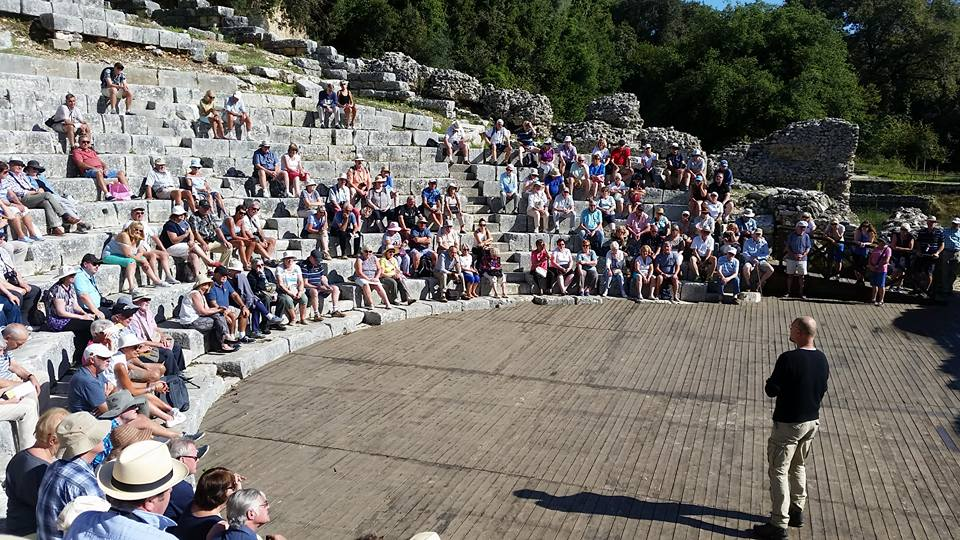
A performance at the ancient theater in Butrint

In 1995, Tare joined the team of the Butrint Foundation, a charity founded by Lord Rothschild and Lord Sainsbury with the aim to research and protect the ancient city of Butrint. He worked for many years with the foundation, managing the project and became the head of the foundation in Albania working together with Sir Patrick Fairweather former UK ambassador to Italy and Albania. Among many efforts in Butrint, most notably was his work in protecting and preserving the site during the most difficult period of Albania's civil unrest. He was part of the team which worked to make Butrint a UNESCO World Heritage Site. After one year of research, he discovered and brought back to Albania the bust of Empress Livia stolen from Butrint in 1992. This beautiful marble bust of Livia was in possession of Robert E. Hecht the famous and controversial figure of the Medici affair. In 2002, Tare started the first scientific underwater project in cooperation with Professor George Bass from Texas A&M looking at potential sites around Butrint Bay and Butrint Lake. This cooperation lead to a major full scale project with the American team of the RPM Nautical Foundation.

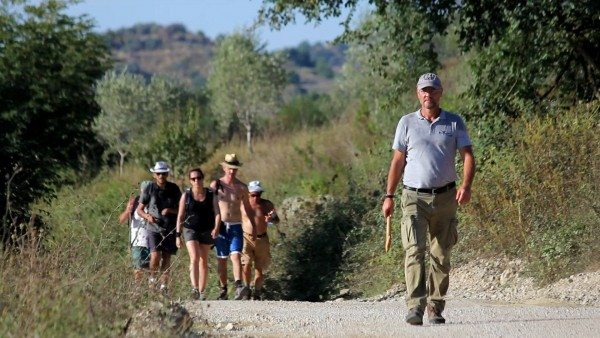

==== 2006 ====
Auron Tare became the head of the Albanian Maritime Research Center, an NGO specializing in underwater archaeological research and expeditions. Along with RPM Nautical Foundation and INA from Texas A&M, the Albanian Maritime Research Center has discovered 37 shipwrecks. In 2014, the photos taken from underwater expeditions garnered international fame when they were made into an art exhibit and showcased from the National Coastal Agency, along with promotion of the newly opened ex-military base of Sazan Island. Research continues to this day.

==== 2009–2013 ====
In 2009, Tare ran for membership in the Albanian Parliament. He served as a member of the Socialist Party of Albania. During this period, Tare led the effort in researching the history of Corfu Channel incident in 1946, which brought Albania and Great Britain into conflict after four British ships hit mines in the Corfu Channel on 21 October 1946.

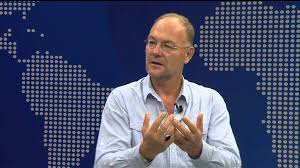

==== Present ====
Today, Tare is currently a member of various Albanian organizations, most notably as the head and founder of the National Coastal Agency (Agjencia Kombëtare e Bregdetit) of Albania, a public authority established in 2014, which deals with the promotion of ecotourism. He also currently serves as chair of Technology and Science for the UNESCO Marine Inquiry Committee (STAB), the Albanian National Trust, founder of Our Own Expeditions, the Cultural Heritage Forum, and remains a representative for Butrint National Park.

In March 2023, Auron Tare made possible the correction of the Numismatic Collection of Butrint in British Museum from Butrint Epir Greece to Butrint Epir Albania, a significant historical accurate information.

He was responsible for opening the former secret military island of Sazan to the general public and tourism, therefore, ending a century-long period of the island being a forbidding place for the public.
