= Baptistery of Butrint =

Ancient baptistery in Albania

The Baptistery of Butrint (Albanian: Pagëzuesi i Butrintit), is an archeological site in Vlorë County, Albania and part of the Butrint National Park. Located in the archaeological site of Butrint, it is a late antique structure known for its well-preserved mosaic pavement. The centrally planned, circular baptistery is also notable as an ancient Roman monument adapted to the needs of Christianity.

Constructed in the 6th century A.D., the baptistry was excavated in May 1928 by an Italian archaeological mission to Albania, led by Luigi Maria Ugolini.

== The baptismal font and water supply ==
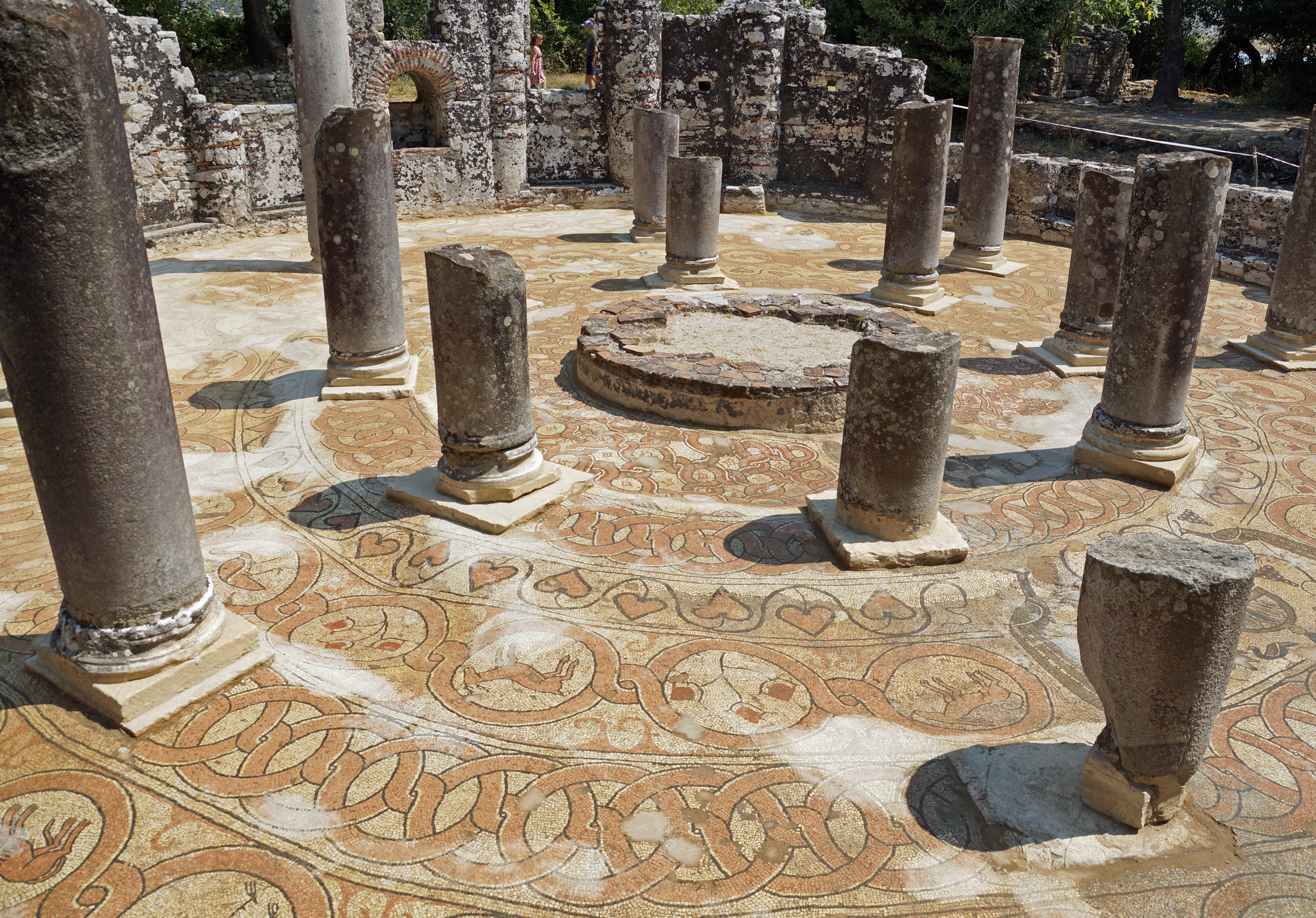
Mosaic floor of the Butrint baptistery

The round structure of the baptistery, measuring 14.5 meters in diameter, was built within a large rectangular space that was either part of a Roman bathhouse or household bathing complex. Archeologists have identified a small room to the northeast of the baptistery as a caldarium, or hot-room, of a Roman hypocaust heating system. The prior existence of this system may explain the choice to build a baptistery there.

The cross-shaped font, the baptistry's central feature, has two interior steps, allowing those about to be baptized to step down into the basin. There, the bishop would have poured water over them with a small vessel. The eastern corner room held a water tank and praefurnium, or furnace for heating water. The hot water was piped underground directly to the font, where it was mixed with cold water from a cistern built into the older Roman caldarium.

Situated within an arched structure in the baptistery wall is another small fountain. It is positioned directly facing the entrance, an unusual characteristic for a baptistry. Archeologists believe it served a symbolic purpose as an image of the Fountain of Life, a Christian iconographic symbol associated with baptism.

== Columns ==
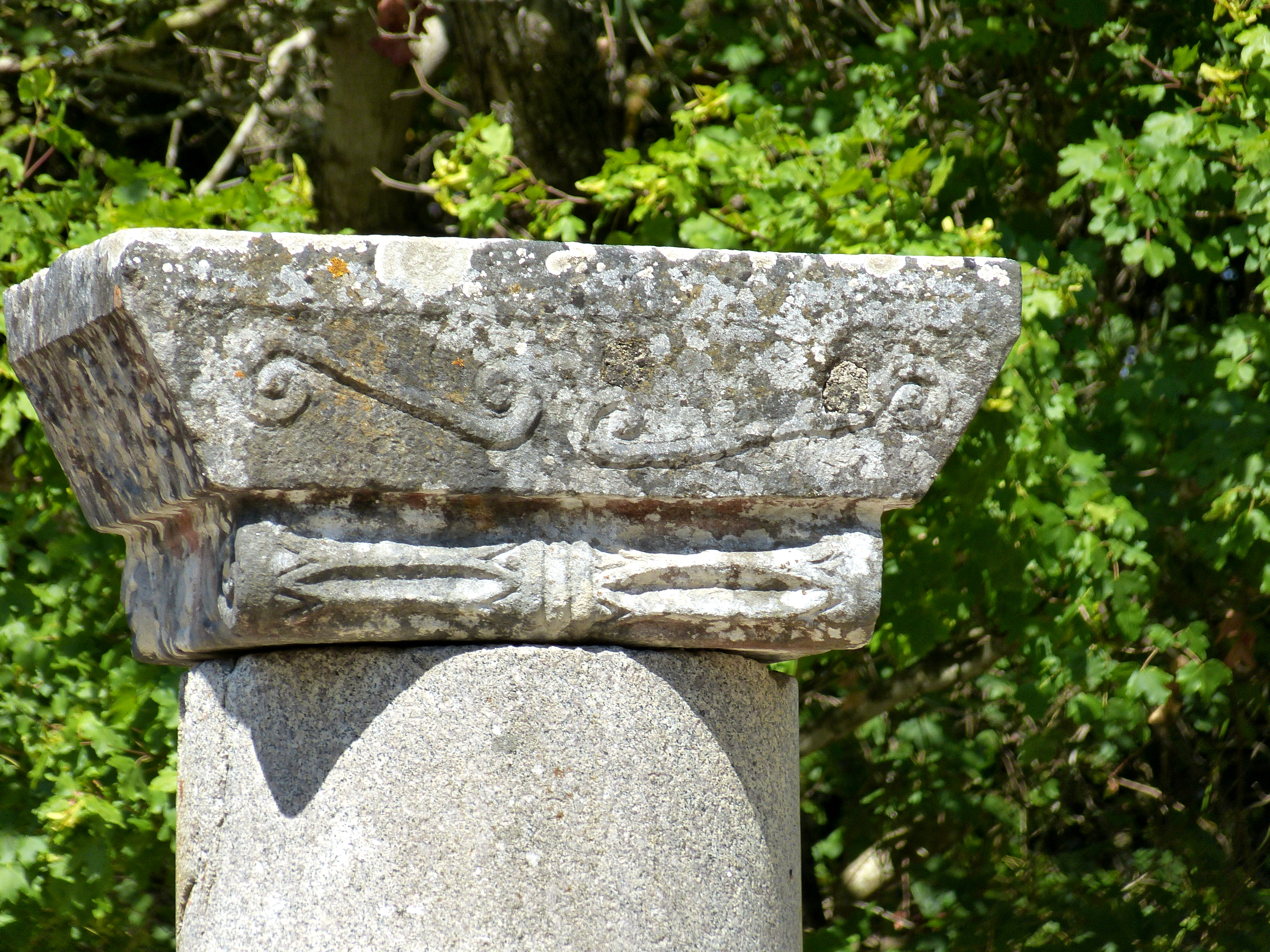
Column capital from the Butrint Baptistry

Two concentric colonnades (each with eight columns, for a total of 16) once supported a wooden roof. Made from Egyptian granite, the columns stood on a variety of repurposed bases. However, the Ionic impost capitals, featuring acanthus leaves and crosses, were likely made specifically for the building. The wall's interior also featured 24 half-columns and was covered with plaster and painted. A low bench, possibly once covered with polished marble, ran continuously around the foot of the interior wall.

Archeologist John Mitchell, in his book The Butrint Baptistry and its Mosaics, remarks on the uniqueness of these two colonnades from an architectural standpoint, writing, "...the fact that each consists of eight columns means that the distance between the shafts in the outer ring is about twice that in the inner ring. This gives rise to technical and aesthetic issues--far wider and higher arches on the outer arcade--that must have tested the ingenuity of architect to the limit. The scheme must have been driven by symbolic considerations--the power of the number eight. ... No other building of the period takes this form."

== Mosaics ==
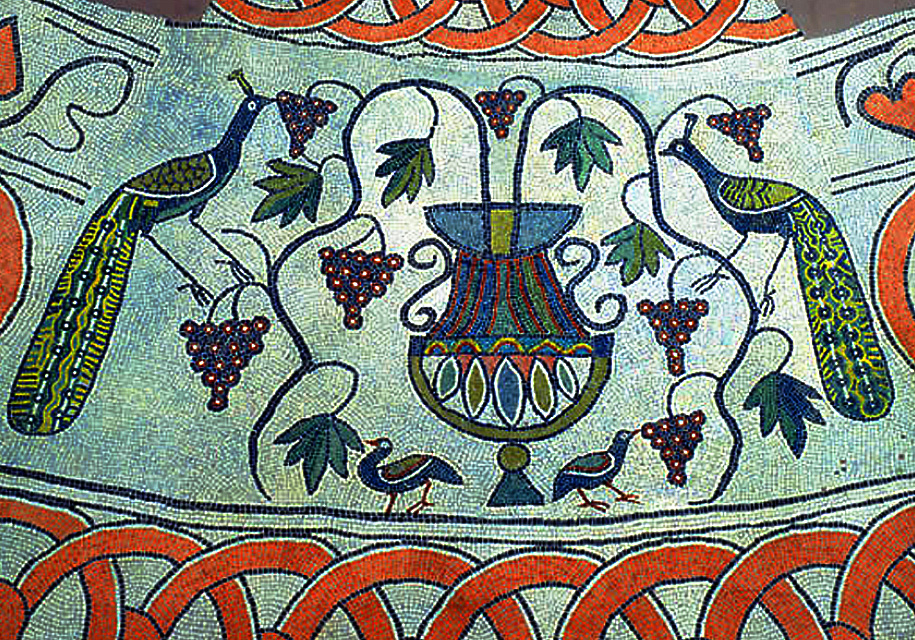
Detail of the baptistry's mosaic floor, depicting two peacocks eating grapes from a kantharos

Today, the most remarkable aspect of the Butrint baptistery is its mosaic pavement. Most likely created by mosaicists from Nicopolis, the mosaic floor is considered the most complex of any late antique baptismal structure still existing in the Mediterranean today. It consists of seven circling bands turning around the central font, the mosaic features iconography relating both to Christianity and to aristocratic life.

The Butrint baptistery mosaics feature two prominent scenes, each strongly evoking Christian iconography befitting a baptismal theme. In one, peacocks are depicted on either side of a kantharos, out of which dangle vines bearing clusters of grapes. According to Mitchell, as peacock flesh was believed not to decompose, the appearance of the animal in late antique art would have symbolized eternal life. The other main scene depicts two stags at a fountain, a reference to a verse from Psalm 42 (“As the hart panteth for the water brooks, so panteth my soul after thee, O God.”). Together, the two images connect water with the concept of everlasting life.

The rest of the mosaics, featuring animals represented within intersecting roundels across the floor, do not carry an overt Christian meaning, although Mitchell interprets them as representative of the biblical Garden of Eden. Birds and sea animals, as well as domesticated and exotic creatures, are juxtaposed. Several panels, however, also reference the hunt, well known throughout classical antiquity as a favored sport of the aristocracy. Thus, the inclusion of exotic creatures, such as leopards, alongside symbols such as a hunting dog and a net could also reference the staged animal hunts conducted by the elite.

Varying motifs throughout the rounded floor may also have demarcated areas of ceremonial importance within the baptistery, rather than simply serve as decoration. Mitchell noted that the checked pattern surrounding the central fountain matches the checked pattern on some of the outermost rings of the medallions. This might have indicated the place where the bishop stood and visually connected the ceremonial power of the fountain with that of the bishop.
