= Hasan Ceka =

Albanian archaeologist and prehistorian

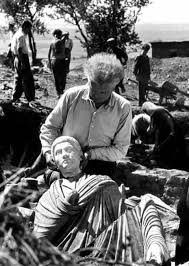
- Born: 25 August 1900; Elbasan, Ottoman Albania
- Died: 2 November 1998 (aged 98); Tirana, Albania
- Education: University of Vienna
- Occupations: Archaeologist, prehistorian, numismatist
- Known for: Apollonia excavations; Illyrian numismatics
- Notable work: Problems of Illyrian Numismatics; Questions of Illyrian Numismatics
- Children: 4

Hasan Ceka (25 August 1900 – 2 November 1998) was an Albanian archaeologist, prehistorian and numismatist. He is regarded as one of the founders of scientific archaeological research in Albania. He played a preeminent role in establishing national archaeological institutions and in advancing the study of Illyrian culture and ancient Albanian coinage.

== Early life and education ==
Hasan Ceka was born in Elbasan, Ottoman Albania. His father, Hysen, was an educator and intellectual involved in Albanian national and cultural movements. Ceka completed his primary and secondary education in Albania and Macedonia before continuing his studies in Austria.

He attended secondary schools in Wels and Linz and later enrolled at the University of Vienna, where he studied history and archaeology. Ceka graduated in 1930, acquiring an academic foundation that later shaped his archaeological methodology.

== Career ==
Upon returning to Albania in 1930, Ceka was appointed to the National Library in Tirana, where he began organizing archaeological collections. These efforts laid the groundwork for future institutional archaeological research in the country.

He participated in archaeological missions at Apollonia and Butrint and was actively involved in collaborations with foreign scholars. In 1947, he directed the first Albanian-led archaeological expedition at Apollonia.

Ceka was instrumental in the establishment of the Archaeological-Ethnographic Museum of Tirana. From 1956 onward, he made regular visits to Apollonia, where he conducted systematic excavations that contributed to the understanding of the ancient city’s urban structure, public monuments and architectural development.

Ceka also made major contributions to numismatics. His studies of Illyrian and ancient Albanian coinage, particularly from Apollonia and Dyrrachium, remain foundational references in the field.

== Selected works ==
- Ilirët dhe Iliria te autorët antikë (Burime të zgjedhura), Tirana 1965.
- Probleme të numismatikës ilire, Tiranë, 1967.
- La Branche Sud de la Voie Egnatia, Monumentet 1 (1971), 25–35.
- Illyrie. Etudes et materiaux archeologiques, 1, 1971.
- Questions de numismatique illyrienne, avec un catalogue des monnaies d'Apollonie et de Durrhachium, Université d'Etat de Tirana, Institut d'Histoire, 1972.
- Inscriptions d'Apollonia d'Illyrie, Athen 1997.
- Në kërkim të historisë ilire, Tiranë, 1998.

== Legacy ==
Hasan Ceka is considered one of the foremost experts in Albanian archaeology. His work shaped research standards, institutional structures and scholarly training for decades. His intellectual legacy continued through his son, Neritan, who also became an archaeologist and public figure.
