= Hysen Ceka =

Hysen Ceka (1866–1921) was an Albanian educator, and activist. Part of the Albanian National Awakening, he is known for his role in promoting the Albanian language and national consciousness in central Albania. He completed his higher education in law at the Mülkiye University in Istanbul, where he actively participated in Albanian patriotic student circles. After graduating successfully, he worked in Monastir (Bitola) as a professor and contributed to the founding of Albanian patriotic societies.

He carried out his patriotic and educational activities across various regions, including Burgajet, where he served as a teacher to Ahmet Zog (later King Zog I), as well as Elbasan, Shpat, Mokra, Gramsh, and Shëngjergj, where, as confirmed by contemporary sources, he operated and taught Albanian in secret to avoid persecution, risking his life. He opened the first Albanian public course in the region and contributed to the opening of the first Albanian-language school in Elbasan on August 2, 1908.

He was a founding member of the "Vllaznia" patriotic society in Elbasan in 1909, alongside Lef Nosi and others, and a participating member of the Congress of Elbasan, which eventually led to the opening of the Shkolla Normale e Elbasanit in December 1909.

In 1910, he resigned from the Ottoman Idadie school after refusing to teach Albanian using the Arabic script. Around the same year, he was arrested by the Ottoman authorities in Elbasan because of his patriotic activities. After Albania’s independence, during 1913–1914, he served as a judge in Gramsh, continuing to support Albanian education and state-building. He died in Elbasan in 1921. In 1942, on the 30th anniversary of Albanian independence, the “Zgjimi” Elementary School in Elbasan was named “Hysen Ceka” in his honor.

He is the father of Hasan Ceka.
