= Patrick Fairweather =

British retired diplomat

Sir Patrick Fairweather (born 17 June 1936) is a British retired diplomat. He served as Ambassador to Angola from 1985 to 1987 and Ambassador to Italy and concurrently Albania from 1992 to 1996. He was director of the Butrint Foundation which was concerned with the archaeology and conservation of Buthrotum, the classical site of Butrint in southern Albania, from 1997 until 2004.

== Background ==
Fairweather, the son of John George Fairweather and Dorothy Jane (née Boanas), was educated at Ottershaw School in Surrey and Trinity College, Cambridge, where he graduated with a degree in history. He married Maria (née Merica) in 1962 and they had two daughters.

== Career ==
After National Service ( 1955–57 ) in the Royal Marines and Parachute Regiment and a brief spell in advertising, Fairweather entered Diplomatic Service in 1965. He served as 2nd Secretary in Rome from 1966 to 1969 and 1st Secretary ( Economic) in Paris from 1970 to 1973.

In 1975, Fairweather was posted to Vientiane ( Laos ) as 1st Secretary and Head of Chancery . In late 1976 after the Communist takeover of Laos and the subsequent downgrading of the embassy, he was appointed 1st secretary in the trade section of the UK Representation to the European Economic Community (EEC) in Brussels. In August 1978 he moved to Athens as Economic and Commercial Counsellor. In January 1983 Fairweather returned to London as Head of European Community Department (Internal) of the FCO.

In October 1985 Fairweather took over as Ambassador to Angola ( and concurrently Sao Tome ) . His colleague Robin Renwick later wrote that during his two-year term in Angola he "served as the indispensable channel of communications for the Americans". In late 1987, he became Assistant Under-Secretary of State of the FCO for Africa and was promoted Deputy Under-Secretary for the Middle East and Africa in September 1990. In June 1992 he was appointed Ambassador to Italy (and concurrently Albania). He left Rome on retirement in June 1996.

After leaving the Diplomatic Service, Fairweather was appointed Senior Adviser at the investment banking arm of Schroders Bank ( merged with Citibank in 2000 ). He also served as the first director of the Butrint Foundation, which concerned itself with the archaeology and conservation of the archaeological site of Butrint in southern Albania from 1997 until 2004.
