= Butrint Foundation =

Butrint Foundation is an international organization founded in 1993 in the UK by Lord Rothschild and Lord Sainsbury of Preston Candover. The foundation aims to conserve, preserve, and develop the Butrint site in southern Albania. Professor Richard Hodges served as director of archaeology. The Packard Humanities Institute provides support. Patrick Fairweather served as the foundation's first director, and was involved in the Buthrotum Roman archaeological site work from 1997 until 2004.
