= Luigi Maria Ugolini =

Italian archaeologist (1895–1936)

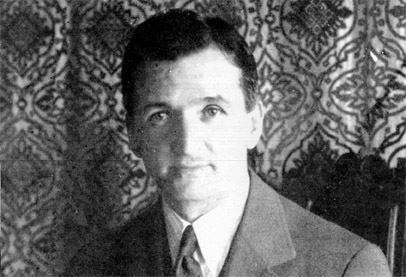
- Born: 8 September 1895; Bertinoro, Romagna, Kingdom of Italy
- Died: 10 October 1936 (aged 41); Bertinoro, Romagna, Kingdom of Italy

Luigi Maria Ugolini (1895–1936) was an Italian archaeologist.

== Biography ==
Ugolini was born in the small town of Bertinoro in the Italian Romagna, the son of a poor watchmaker. He shone at school and after service in the First World War in the Alpini studied archaeology at Bologna University. He was soon talent spotted by major figures in the Italian archaeological establishment of the early years of the fascist government and in 1924 was offered the chance to lead a mission to Albania. This work led him to excavate at Finiq and nearby Butrint in southern Albania, where his excavations uncovered the theater with a fine group of statues, the late-antique baptistery and many other monuments. In 1931 he was also offered the opportunity to work on the island of Malta where he led a project for a number of years until his death.

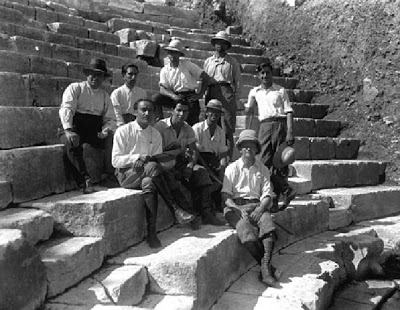
Ugolini in Butrint

Though his work was later to be unfairly derided as 'fascist archaeological ineptitude', Ugolini was a capable archaeologist undertaking and documenting major scientific work. He is chiefly interesting today though for his position vis-a-vis the geopolitical situation of the time; and is an example of the many ambitious scientists of the age who were, with greater or lesser conviction, to serve the totalitarian regimes of interwar Europe. Ugolini had been sent to Albania and Malta with specific aims, to underscore fascist ambitions of trans-Adriatic hegemony by 'proving' the cultural links between Italy and Albania through archaeology. Thus he identified many of his finds with places seen or visited by the mythical Trojan Aeneas, founder of the Roman race, who was supposed to have visited Butrint during his wanderings following the destruction of Troy. Likewise he argued for strong links in the Bronze and Iron Ages between the Illyrian cultures of Albania and the pre-classical civilisations of southern Italy. Similar arguments were pursued for Malta.

Ugolini is noted as a dynamic and charismatic personality who learned to work with and manipulate the labyrinthine bureaucracy of the fascist regime to his own advantage. He had been seriously wounded in the kidneys during his war service and was increasingly ill during the 1930s. Finally, in 1936 he was forced to abandon his work at Butrint and retired to his home town where he died on October 10, 1936.

== External references ==
- Times of Malta
- Nicholas C. Vella and Oliver Gilkes, "The Lure of the Antique: Nationalism, Politics and Archaeology in British Malta (1880-1964)", Papers of the British School at Rome, Vol. 69, Centenary Volume (2001), pp. 353–384 (32 pages)
