= RPM Nautical Foundation =

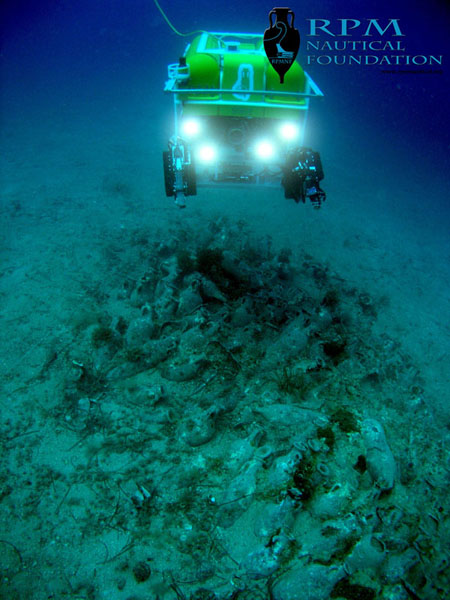
RPMNF's ROV recording the 4th-century CE Joni wreck site in Albania

RPM Nautical Foundation (RPMNF) is a nonprofit archaeological research and educational organization dedicated to the advancement of maritime archaeology that includes littoral surveys and excavation of individual shipwreck and harbor sites.

RPM Nautical Foundation is organized within the meaning of sections 170(c)(2) and 501(c)(3) of the United States Internal Revenue Code. RPMNF has identified and researched Mediterranean countries. RPMNF's projects have recorded shipwreck sites and harbors in Spain, Albania, Montenegro, Croatia, Malta, Morocco, Cyprus, Sicily, Amalfi and Calabria in Italy, Tunisia, and Turkey. RPMNF research vessel R/V Hercules is based in Valletta, Malta, during the winter months.

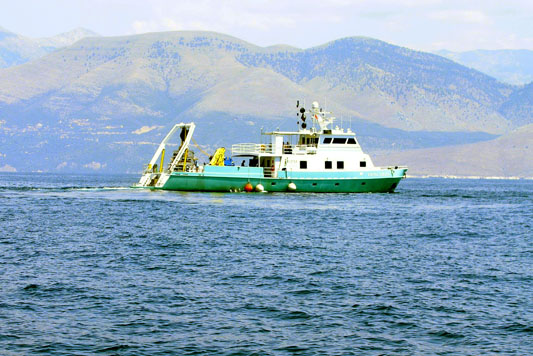
R/V Hercules surveying in Albania

== History ==
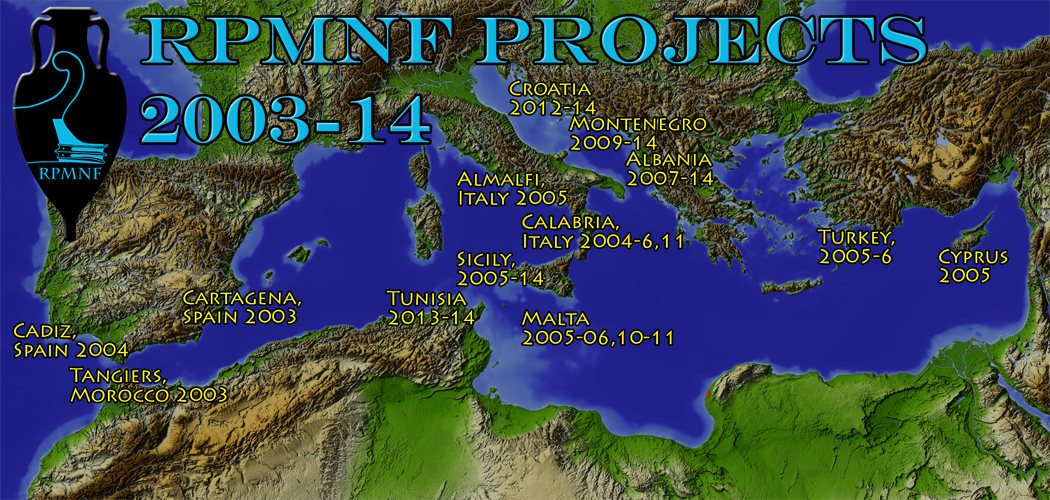
RPMNF expedition areas through 2014

The foundation was established in 2001 by its president, George Robb, who was a director for the Institute of Nautical Archaeology. It was established as a supporting institute for the institute's early fieldwork in Florida and selected projects in the Mediterranean.

In 2003, Jeff Royal became archaeological director, and took over as executive director in 2011. At the end of 2010, RPMNF entered into an agreement and is a supporting institute for the Program in Maritime Studies at East Carolina University.

== Institutional partners ==
- Albanian Institute of Archaeology
- Croatian Ministry of Culture
- East Carolina University Maritime Studies
- Institute of Nautical Archaeology
- Malta Ministry of Culture and Tourism
- Montenegro Ministry of Culture
- Moroccan Ministry of Culture
- Superintendent of Archaeology, Calabria
- Superintendent of Underwater Archaeology, Sicily
- Tunisian Ministry of Culture

== See also ==
- Archaeology of shipwrecks
- Underwater archaeology
- Underwater search and recovery
