= Acacius =

Acacius is a masculine given name which may refer to:

== Saints ==
- Acathius of Melitene (died c. 251), Bishop of Melitene, venerated by the Eastern Orthodox Church
- Agathius, also known as Acacius of Byzantium (died 303), martyred Cappadocian Greek centurion of the imperial army
  - An early Church of St Acacius existed at Constantinople, possibly connected with this martyr.
- Acacius of Sebaste (died c. 304), Armenian priest
- Acacius (died 320), Roman soldier and one of the Forty Martyrs of Sebaste
- Acacius of Amida, Bishop of Amida, Mesopotamia (400–425)
- Acacius of Constantinople (died 489), Ecumenical Patriarch of Constantinople, Oriental Orthodox saint engaged in the Christological controversy
- Saint Acacius, leader of the Ten thousand martyrs (Roman soldiers who converted to Christianity and were crucified in Armenia), according to medieval legend
- Acacius the Younger (died 1730), Greek Orthodox monk who lived on Mount Athos

== Other uses ==
- Acacius the grammarian from Caesarea; friend of Libanius (314–394)
- Acacius of Caesarea (d. 366), a.k.a. "the One-Eyed", bishop in Caesarea, opponent of St. Cyril of Jerusalem
- Acacius of Beroea (d. 437), Syrian bishop
- Acacius of Seleucia-Ctesiphon (d. 496), Patriarch of the Church of the East
- Acacius, father of Theodora (6th century) (500–548), empress of the Byzantine Empire
- Acacius (proconsul), Byzantine proconsul of Armenia Prima (First Armenia), c. 536-539
- Acacius (Alexandria), Byzantine military officer in Alexandria, c. 539-540
- Acacius (curator), Byzantine imperial curator in the 560s
- Acacius (son of Archelaus), Byzantine imperial representative, active c. 573

== See also ==
- Acacia (disambiguation)
