= Aqaq =

Aqaq is the Syriac form of the name Acacius. Notable people with the name include:

- Acacius of Amida (died 425), Syrian bishop
- Acacius of Beroea (died 437), Syrian bishop
- Acacius of Seleucia-Ctesiphon (died 496), Syrian patriarch
