= Las Acacias =

Las Acacias may refer to:

- Las Acacias, Montevideo
- Las Acacias (Madrid)
- Las Acacias (Málaga), a district of Málaga, Spain
- Las Acacias (film), a 2011 Argentine film

== See also ==
- Acacia (disambiguation)
