= Forty Martyrs Cathedral, Homs =

Greek Orthodox church in Homs, Syria

Holy Forty Martyrs of Sebastia Cathedral
- كاتدرائية الأربعين شهيدا
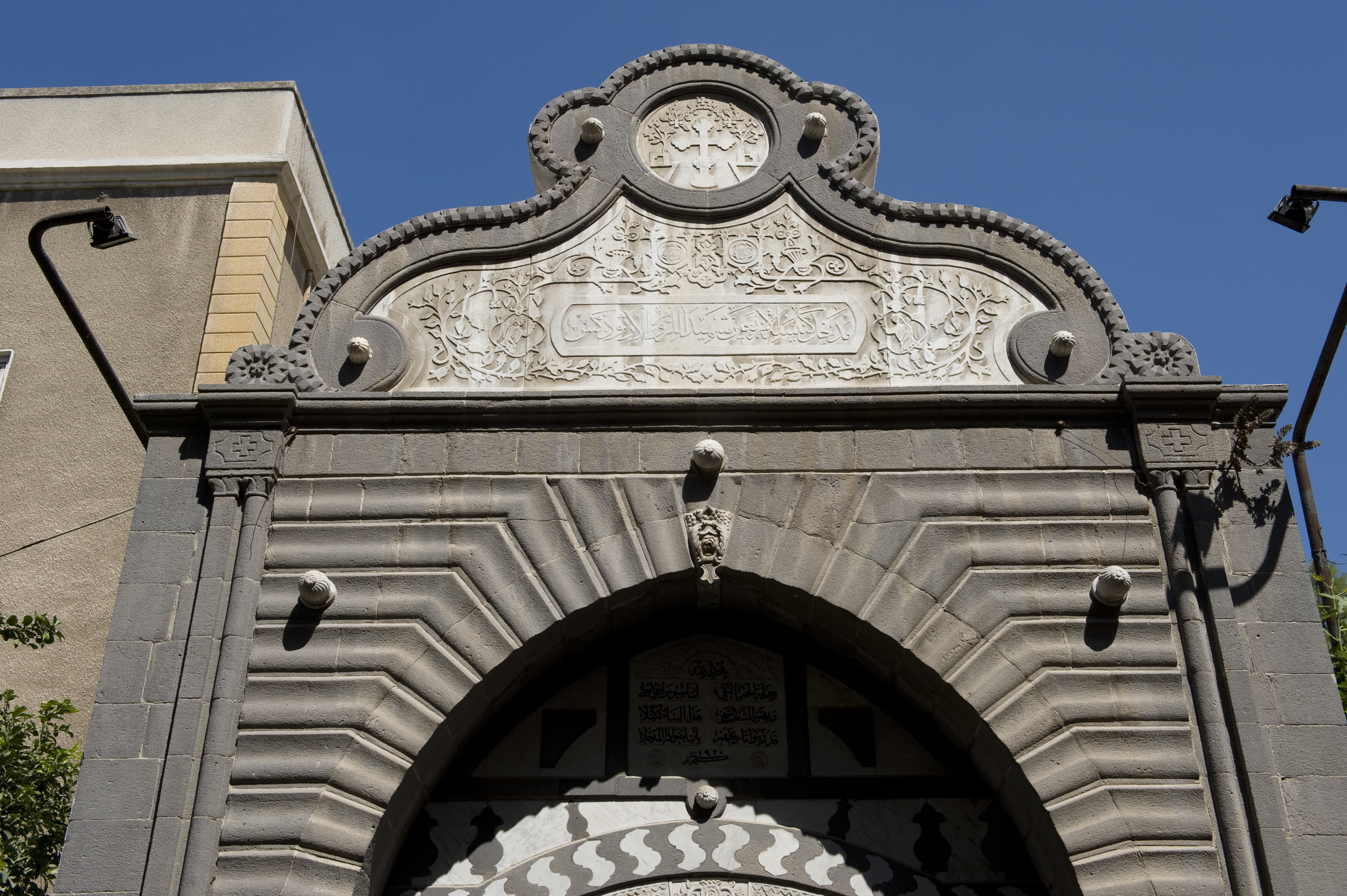
- The cathedral entrance in 2008

- Location of the cathedral in Syria
- 34°43′43″N 36°43′15″E
- Address: Old City of Homs
- Country: Syria
- Denomination: Greek Orthodox Church of Antioch

History
- Status: Cathedral

Architecture
- Architectural type: Church
- Completed: 15th century AD

Administration
- Archdiocese: Homs and Dependencies

The Holy Forty Martyrs of Sebastia Cathedral (Arabic: كاتدرائية الأربعين شهيدا) is a Greek Orthodox cathedral located in the Old City of Homs, Syria. Dedicated to the Forty Martyrs of Sebaste, the cathedral is the seat of the Greek Orthodox Archbishop of Homs and Dependencies.

A "beautiful church dedicated to the Forty Martyrs" standing in Homs was mentioned by Joos van Ghistele in the 15th century.

By 1914, "a large bell" had been sent from Russia for this church.

== See also ==
- Eastern Orthodoxy in Syria
- Greek Orthodox Patriarchate of Antioch
