= Acacia (disambiguation) =

Acacia is a genus of shrubs and trees of Gondwanian origin, belonging to the subfamily Mimosoideae of the family Fabaceae.

Acacia(s) may also refer to:

== Plants ==
Other genera formerly included under Acacia, and still sometimes referred to by that name (or as Acacia sensu lato, include:

- Faidherbia
- Vachellia
- Senegalia
- Mariosousa
- Acaciella
- Shittah tree (Acacia referenced in the Hebrew Bible possibly referring to Faidherbia and/or Vachellia above)

== Arts and entertainment ==
- Acacia (band), a British pop band from the 1990s
- Acacia Brinley, American influencer (born 1997)
- Acacia Forgot, American drag performer (born 1996)
- Acacia (film), a 2003 South Korean horror film
- The Acacia Strain, an American metalcore band formed in 2001
- Acacia: The War with the Mein, a novel by American author David Anthony Durham

== Companies and organisations ==
- Acacia Mining, an English mining company operating in Tanzania
- Acacia Prison, a private prison in Western Australia
- Acacia Research, an American research company specialising in patent enforcement

== Places ==
- Acacías, a town and municipality of Meta Department, Colombia
- Las Acacias (Madrid), a ward of Madrid, Spain
- Las Acacias, Montevideo, a ward of Montevideo, Uruguay
- San Acacia, New Mexico, an unincorporated community, United States

== Watercraft ==
- USCGC ACACIA (WLB-406), a US Coast Guard ship
- USS Acacia, a steam-powered tugboat in the service of the US Navy during the American Civil War

== Other uses ==
- 2S3 Akatsiya, Russian for acacia, a Soviet 152.4 mm self-propelled artillery
- Acacia Avenue, a placeholder name for an English suburban road
- Acacia Fraternity, a social fraternity, historically based on Masonic traditions
- The Acacias, an historic home in Adelaide, South Australia
- Gum acacia, another name for gum arabic

== See also ==
- Acacia Park (disambiguation)
- Acacius, a masculine given name
- Acaiaca, a city in Minas Gerais, Brazil
