= Islam Radovicka =

Albanian politician

Islam Radovicka (1889–1948) was an Albanian Partisan commander during World War II.

Born in Radovickë, in the modern commune of Çlirim he enrolled in the military academy of Tirana in 1925. In 1935 he became a captain of the Royal Albanian Army. An informant of the anti-fascist groups he remained in the army until 1943 as a recruiting officer, when he defected and joined LANÇ. Radovicka was general commander of the 10th operative zone in the Vlorë-Gjirokastër-Mallakastër area. As such he led the local Partisans in the capture of Sarandë in 1944 along with British commandos under Brigadier Tom Churchill. He was a deputy of the Gjirokastër County in the first post-war legislature until 1947 when he was arrested during the pro-Yugoslav purges by Koçi Xoxe's group. After Xoxe's downfall he was rehabilitated posthumously in the party structure.
