= Sarandë =

City in southern Albania

Sarandë Άγιοι Σαράντα
- Municipality
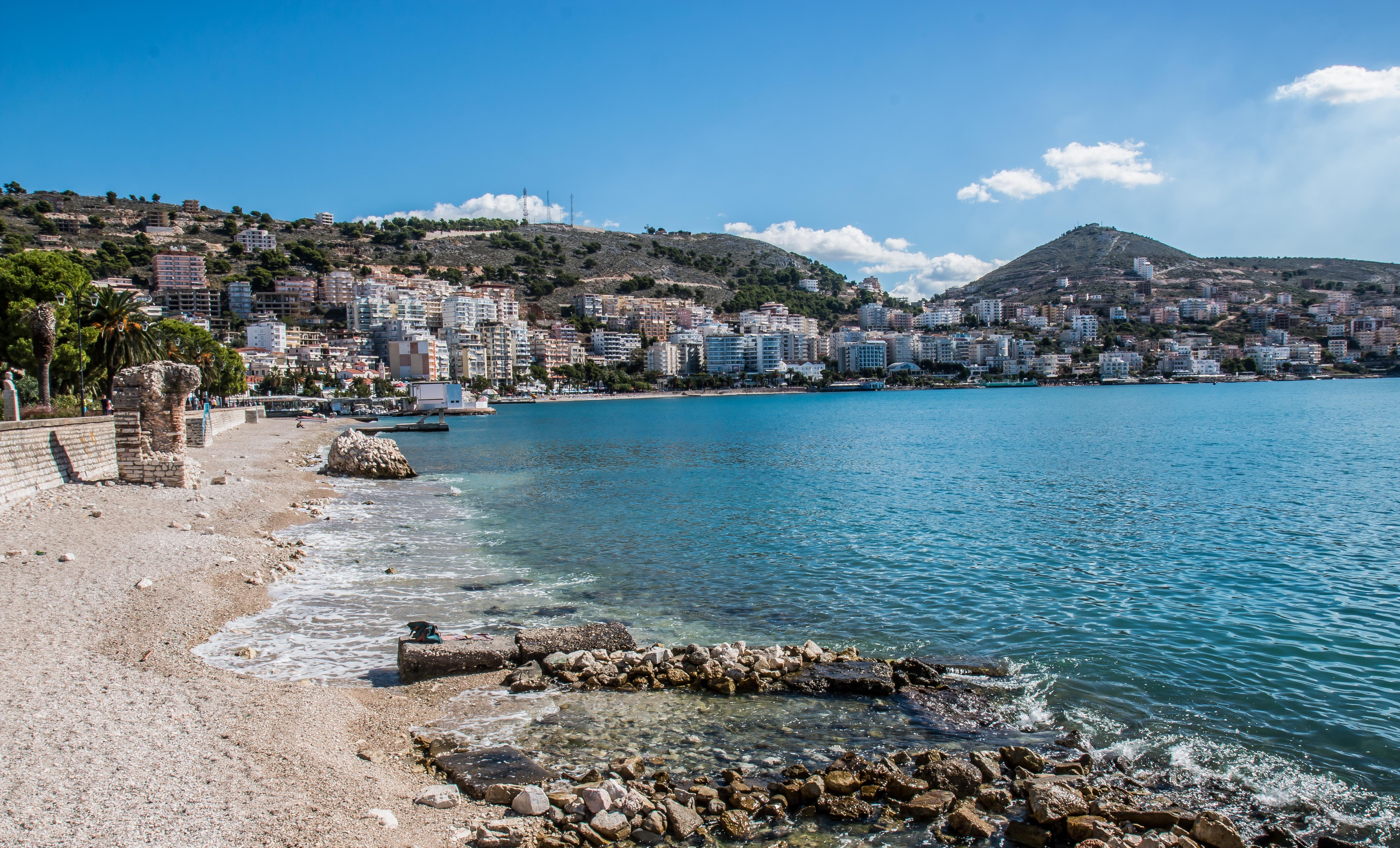
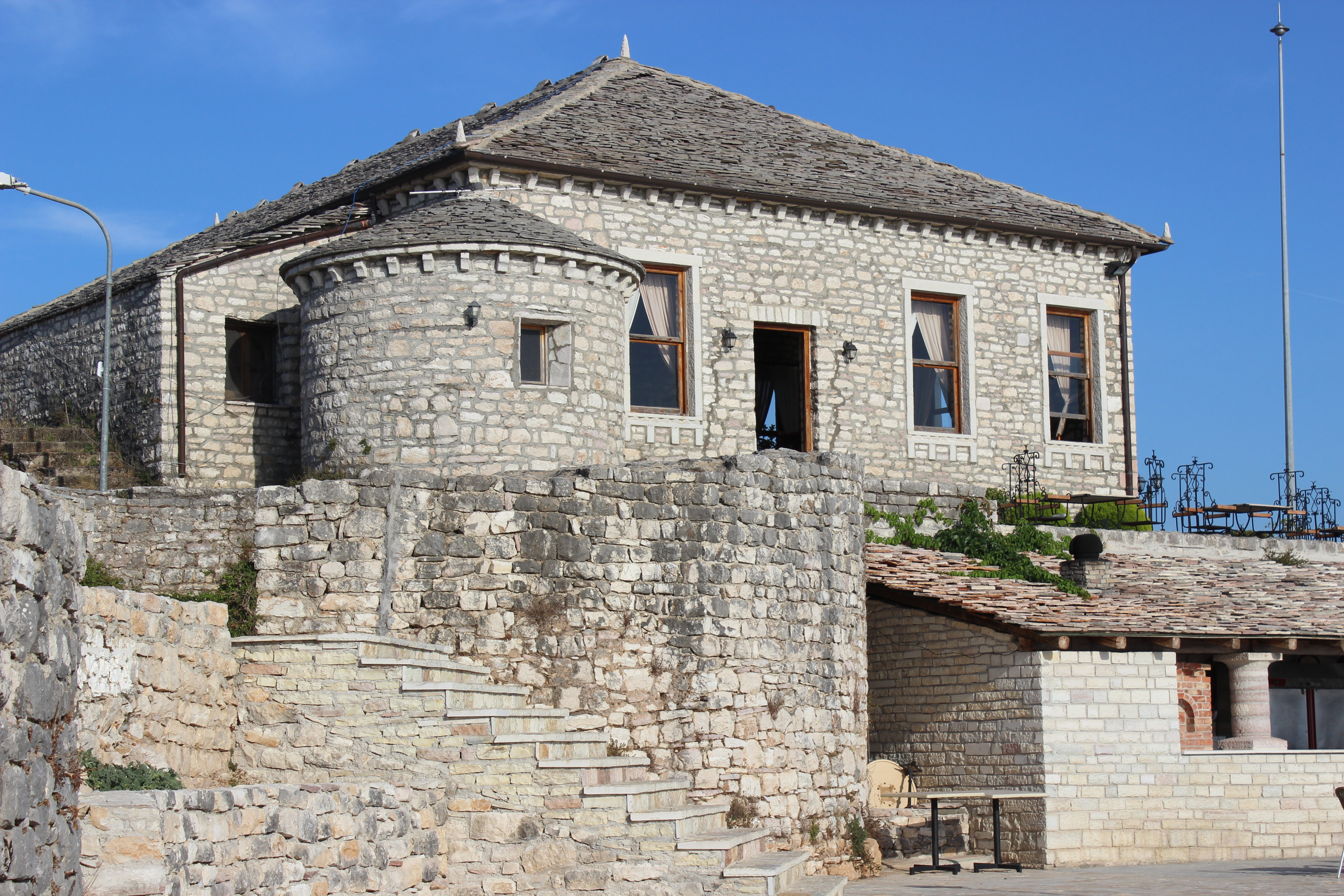
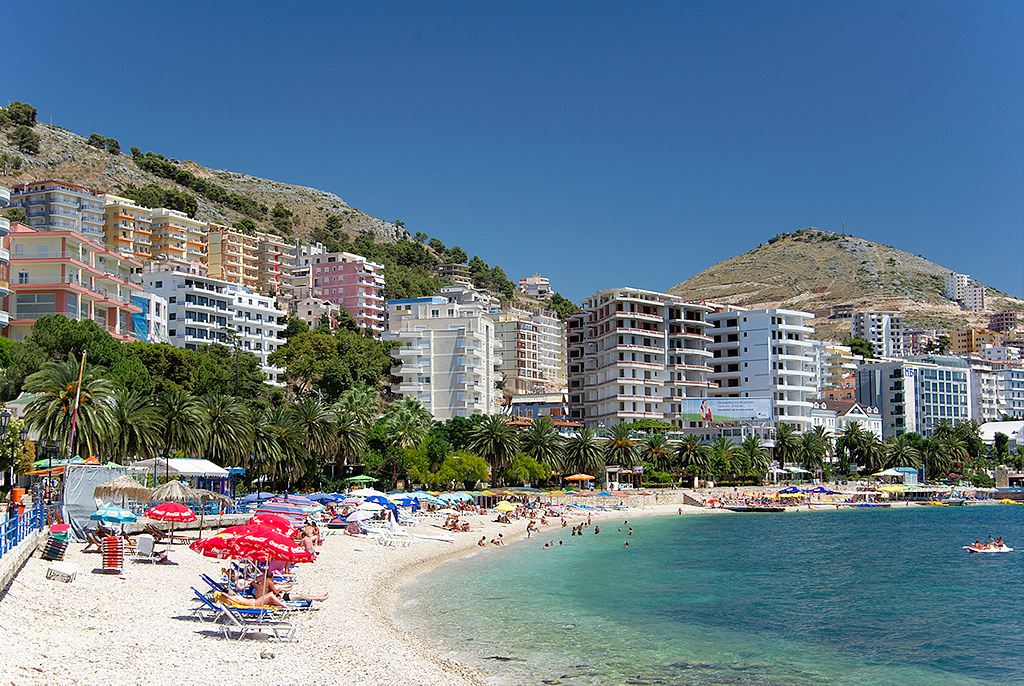
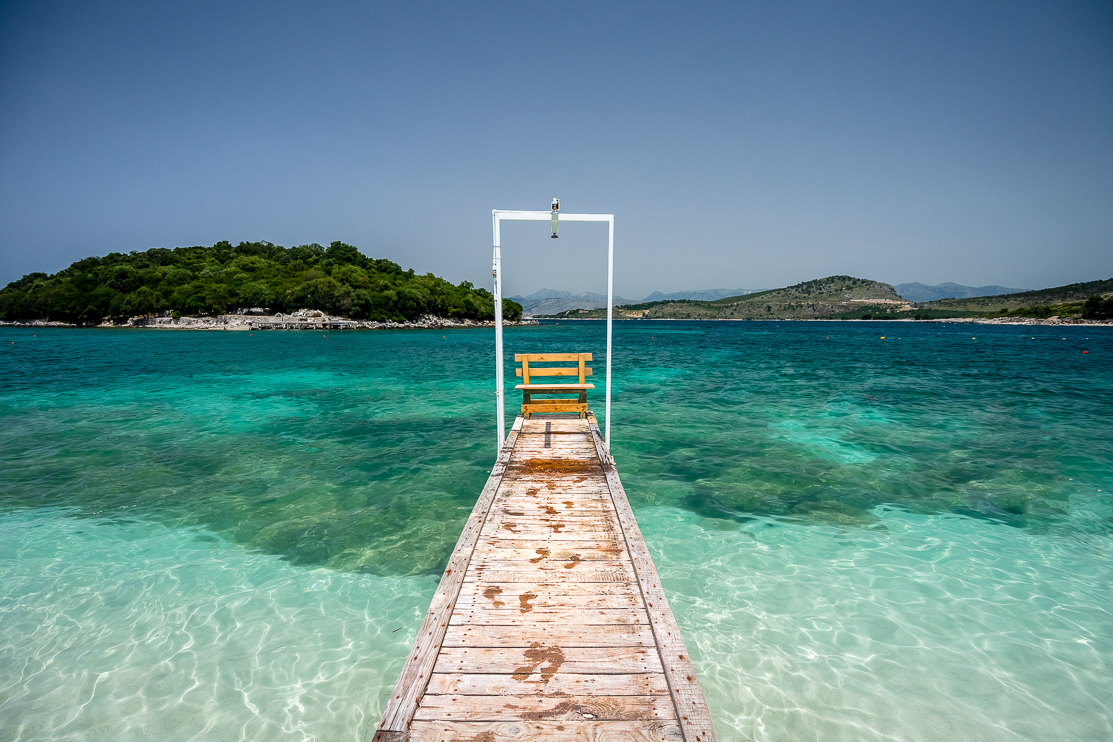
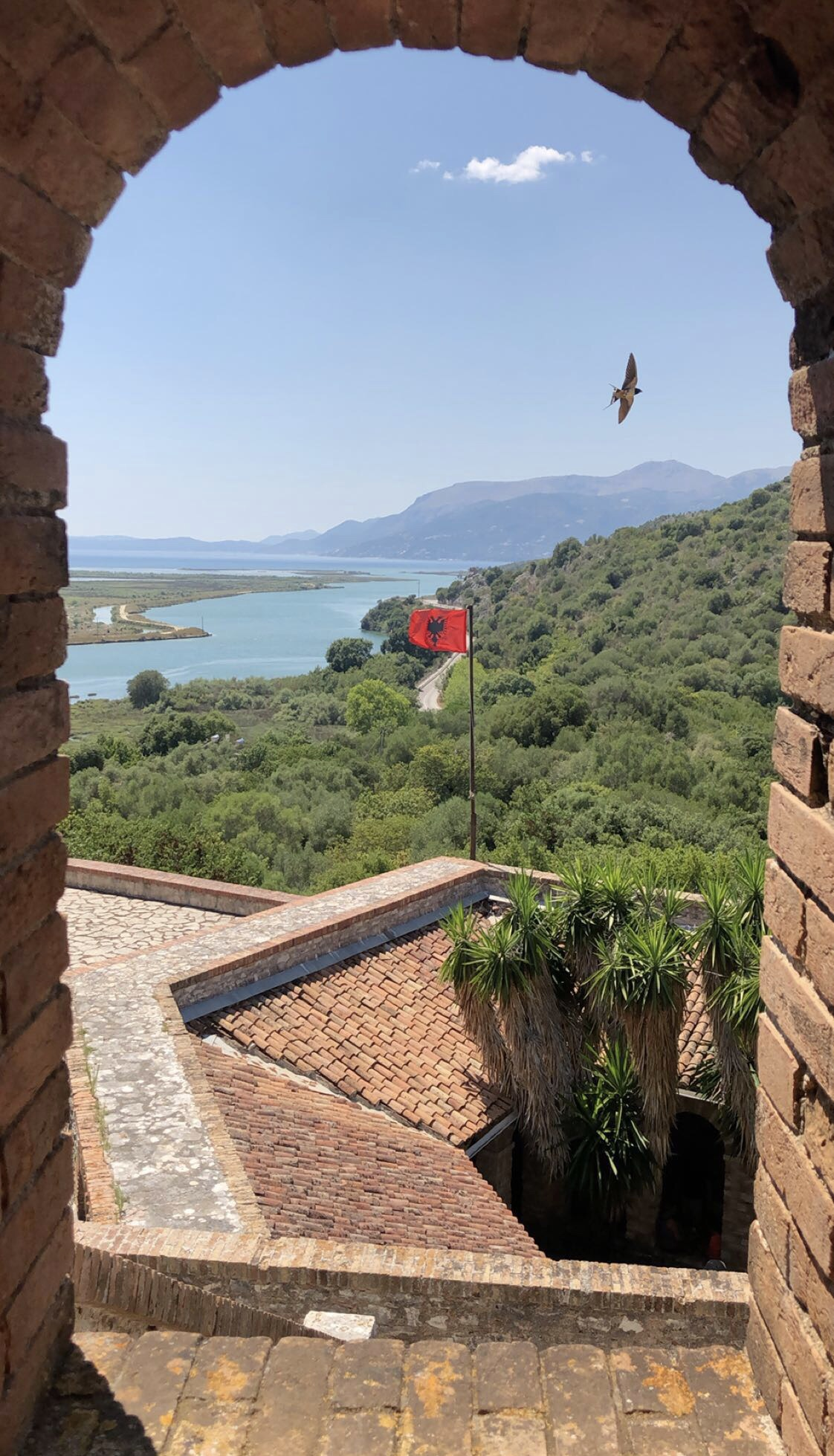
- View of Sarandë Lëkurësi Castle Promenade of Sarandë Islets of Ksamil Butrint National Park

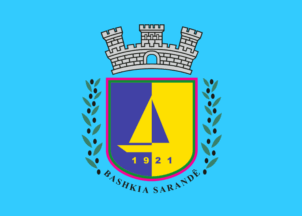
- Flag Emblem

- Location within Albania
- Coordinates: 39°52.5′N 20°0.6′E
- Country: Albania
- County: Vlorë

Government
  - Mayor: Oltion Çaçi (PS)

Area
  - Municipality: 58.96 km^{2} (22.76 sq mi)
  - Administrative unit: 16.73 km^{2} (6.46 sq mi)
- Elevation: 75 m (246 ft)

Population (2023)
  - Municipality: 22,613
  - Municipality density: 383.5/km^{2} (993.3/sq mi)
  - Administrative unit: 19,882
  - Administrative unit density: 1,188/km^{2} (3,078/sq mi)
- Demonym(s): Albanian: Sarandiot (m), Sarandiote (f)
- Time zone: UTC+1 (CET)
  - Summer (DST): UTC+2 (CEST)
- Postal Code: 9701–9703
- Area Code: (0)85
- Website: bashkiasarande.gov.al

Sarandë (Albanian: [saˈɾandə]; Albanian definite form: Saranda; Greek: Άγιοι Σαράντα) is a city in Albania and the seat of Sarandë Municipality. Geographically, the city is located on an open sea gulf of the Ionian Sea within the Mediterranean Sea. Stretching along the Albanian Ionian Sea Coast, Sarandë has a Mediterranean climate with over 300 sunny days a year.

In ancient times, the city was known as Onchesmus and Onchesmos, and was a port-town of Chaonia in ancient Epirus. It owes its modern name to the nearby Byzantine monastery of the Forty Saints by which it became known from the High Middle Ages. Sarandë today is known for its deep blue Mediterranean waters. Near Sarandë are the remains of the ancient city of Butrint, a UNESCO World Heritage site. In recent years, Sarandë has seen a steady increase in tourists, many of them coming by cruise ships. Visitors are attracted by the natural environment of Sarandë and its archaeological sites. Sarandë is inhabited by a majority of ethnic Albanians, and also has a minority Greek community and as such has been considered one of the two centers of the Greek minority in Albania.

== Name ==
Sarandë was named after the Byzantine monastery of the Agioi Saranda 'Forty Saints' in Greek, that is, the Forty Martyrs of Sebaste. Under Ottoman rule, the town in the Turkish language became known as Aya Sarandi and then Sarandoz. Owing to Venetian influence in the region, it often appeared under its Italian name Santi Quaranta on Western maps. This usage continued even after the establishment of the Principality of Albania, owing to the first Italian occupation of the region. The Greek name of the city is Άγιοι Σαράντα, Ágioi Saránta.

Among its population, Sarandë became the common name of the settlement only in the early 19th century, when it gradually replaced the local name Skelë. During the Italian occupation of Albania in World War II, Benito Mussolini changed the name to Porto Edda, in honor of his eldest daughter. Following the restoration of Albanian independence, the city reverted to its Albanian name Saranda.

== History ==
=== Early history ===
Due to the archaic features found in the Ancient Greek name of the city: Onchesmos (Ancient Greek: Ὄγχεσμος) (Latinized form: Onchesmus) and the toponyms of the surrounding region it appears that the site was part of a proto-Greek area in late 3rd-early 2nd millennium BC. Bronze Age tools typical of Mycenaean Greece have been unearthed in Sarandë which date c. 1400-1100 BC. In antiquity the city was known by the name of Onchesmus or Onchesmos and was a port-town of Chaonia in ancient Epirus, opposite the northwestern point of Corcyra, and the next port upon the coast to the south of Panormus. It was inhabited by the ancient Greek tribe of the Chaonians.

Onchesmos flourished as the port of the Chaonian capital Phoenice (modern-day Finiq). It seems to have been a place of importance in the time of Cicero, and one of the ordinary points of departure from Epirus to Italy, as Cicero calls the wind favourable for making that passage an Onchesmites. According to Dionysius of Halicarnassus the real name of the place was the Port of Anchises (Ἀγχίσου λιμήν), named after Anchises, the father of Aeneas; and it was probably owing to this tradition that the name Onchesmus assumed the form of Anchiasmus or Anchiasmos (Greek: Ἀγχιασμός) under the Byzantine Empire.

Sarandë, then under the name of Onchesmos, is held to be the site of Albania's first synagogue, which was built in the 4th or 5th century. It is thought that it was built by the descendants of Jewish captives who arrived on the southern shores of Albania around 70 CE, during the First Jewish–Roman War. Onchesmos' synagogue was supplanted by a church in the 6th century.

The city was probably raided by the Ostrogoths in 551 CE, while, during this period, it became also the target of piratic raids by Gothic ships. In a medieval chronicle of 1191 the settlement appears to be abandoned, while its former name (Anchiasmos) isn't mentioned any more. From that year, the toponym borrows the name of the nearby Orthodox basilica church of Agioi Saranta, erected in the 6th century, ca. 1 km (0.6 mi) southeast of the modern town.

=== Modern history ===
In the early 19th century during the rule of Ali Pasha, British diplomat William Martin Leake reported that there existed a small settlement under the name Skala or Skaloma next to the harbor. Following the Ottoman administrative reform of 1867, a müdürluk (independent unit) of Sarandë consisting of no other villages was created within the kaza (district) of Delvinë. Sarandë in the late Ottoman period until the Balkan Wars (1912–1913) consisted of only a harbour being a simple commercial station without permanent residents or any institutional community organisation. The creation of the Saranda müdürluk was related to the desires of Ottoman authorities to upgrade the port and reduce the economic dependence of the area on Ioannina and Preveza. In 1878, a Greek rebellion broke out, with revolutionaries taking control of Sarandë and Delvinë. This was suppressed by Ottoman troops, who burned twenty villages in the region. Sarandë itself was burnt by the Greek rebels. One of the earliest photographs of Saranda dates from 3 March 1913 and shows Greek soldiers in the main street during the course of the Second Balkan War. Saranda was an important city in the Autonomous Republic of Northern Epirus.

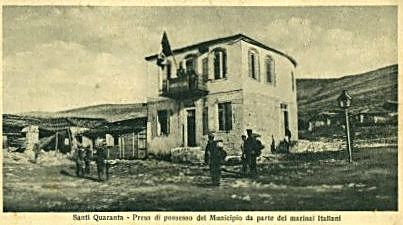
Italian occupied Sarandë in 1917

Greek troops occupied it during the Balkan Wars. Later, the town was included in the newly formed Albanian state on 17 December 1913 under the terms of the Protocol of Florence. The decision was rejected by the local Greek population, and as the Greek army withdrew to the new border, the Autonomous Republic of Northern Epirus was established. In May 1914, negotiations were started in Sarandë between representative of the provisional government of Northern Epirus and that of Albania which continued in nearby Corfu and ended up with the recognition of the Northern Epirote autonomy inside the newly established Albanian state.

It was then occupied by Italy between 1916 and 1920 as part of the Italian Protectorate on southern Albania. Throughout 1926–1939 of the interwar period, Italy financed extensive improvements to the harbour at Sarandë. A small Romanian Institute was established in 1938. Sarandë was again occupied by Italian forces in 1939, and was a strategic port during the Italian invasion of Greece. During this occupation, it was called "Porto Edda" in honor of the eldest daughter of Benito Mussolini.

During the Greco-Italian War, the city came under the control of the advancing Greek forces, on 6 December 1940. The capture of this strategic port further accelerated the Greek penetration to the north. As a result of the German invasion in Greece in April 1941, the town returned to Italian control. On 9 October 1944 the town was captured by a group of British commandos under Brigadier Tom Churchill and local partisans of LANÇ under Islam Radovicka. The actions of the British troops was viewed with suspicion by LANÇ as they suspected that the British would occupy the town to use as a base and provide aid to their allies in the Greek resistance in the area as British documents indicated that EDES forces also joined the operation. However, the British troops soon withdrew from the region, leaving the region to the Albanian communist forces.

As part of the People's Republic of Albania (1945–1991) policies a number of Muslim Albanians were settled from northern Albania in the area and local Christians are no longer the only community in Saranda. During this period as a result of the atheistic campaign launched by the state the church of Saint Spyridon in the harbor of the city was demolished. After the restoration of democracy in Albania (1991) a small shrine was erected at the place of the church.

In 1992, during the escalation of violence against ethnic Greek communities in southern Albania, incidents included the burning down of Greek shops in the city harbour and vandalization of the Omonoia organization offices (the latter being the political party of the Greeks in the country).

During the 1997 Albanian civil unrest, units comprised by the local Greek minority were able to achieve the first military success for the opposition through the capture of a government tank.

== Geography ==
Part of the Albanian Riviera, Sarandë is situated on the arch-shaped bay of Sarandë between the Gormarti and Berdeneshi Hills and the Albanian Ionian Sea Coast in southwestern Albania. Sarandë Municipality is encompassed in Vlorë County as part of the Southern Region of Albania and consists of the adjacent administrative units of Ksamil and Sarandë. Its total area is 58.96 km^{2}.

=== Climate ===
Sarandë has a hot-summer Mediterranean climate (Csa) as of the Köppen climate classification.

Climate data for Sarandë
Month	Jan	Feb	Mar	Apr	May	Jun	Jul	Aug	Sep	Oct	Nov	Dec	Year
Mean daily maximum °C (°F)	13.5 (56.3)	14 (57)	16 (61)	21 (70)	24 (75)	30 (86)	33.5 (92.3)	33.5 (92.3)	29 (84)	23.2 (73.8)	20 (68)	14.5 (58.1)	22.7 (72.8)
Mean daily minimum °C (°F)	5 (41)	6 (43)	8 (46)	10 (50)	13 (55)	19 (66)	21 (70)	21 (70)	18 (64)	12.6 (54.7)	9.5 (49.1)	7 (45)	12.5 (54.5)
Average precipitation mm (inches)	120 (4.7)	122 (4.8)	100 (3.9)	80 (3.1)	53 (2.1)	20 (0.8)	14 (0.6)	16 (0.6)	70 (2.8)	125 (4.9)	180 (7.1)	175 (6.9)	1,075 (42.3)
Average precipitation days	8	8	8	7	5	2	1	2	6	7	9	10	73
Average relative humidity (%)	74	73	74	74	65	55	52	57	67	74	75	75	68
Mean daily sunshine hours	6.0	6.7	8.1	9.6	10.8	11.9	12.7	11.9	9.7	7.7	6.3	5.9	8.9

== Economy ==
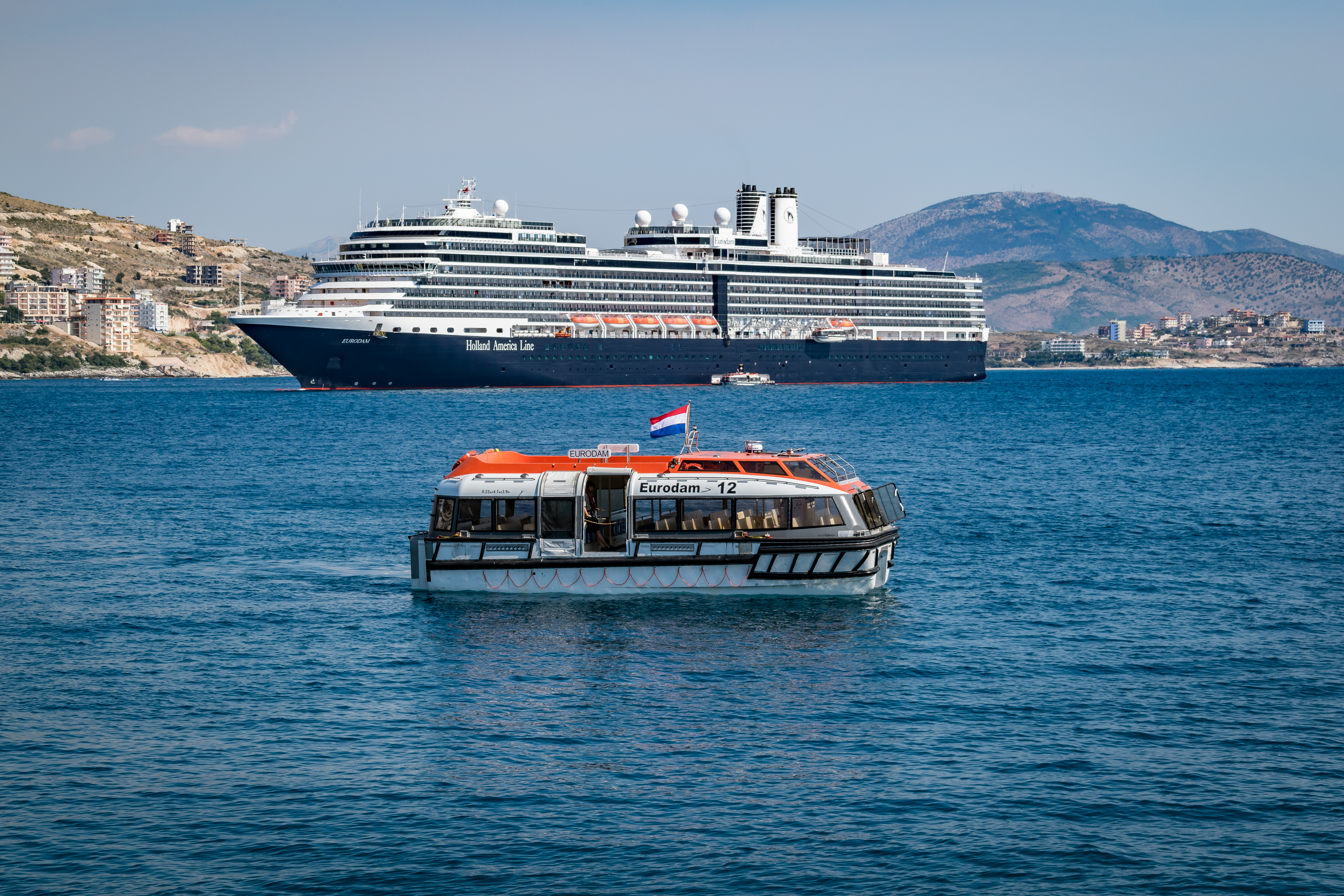
Holland America Eurodam ship in Sarandë

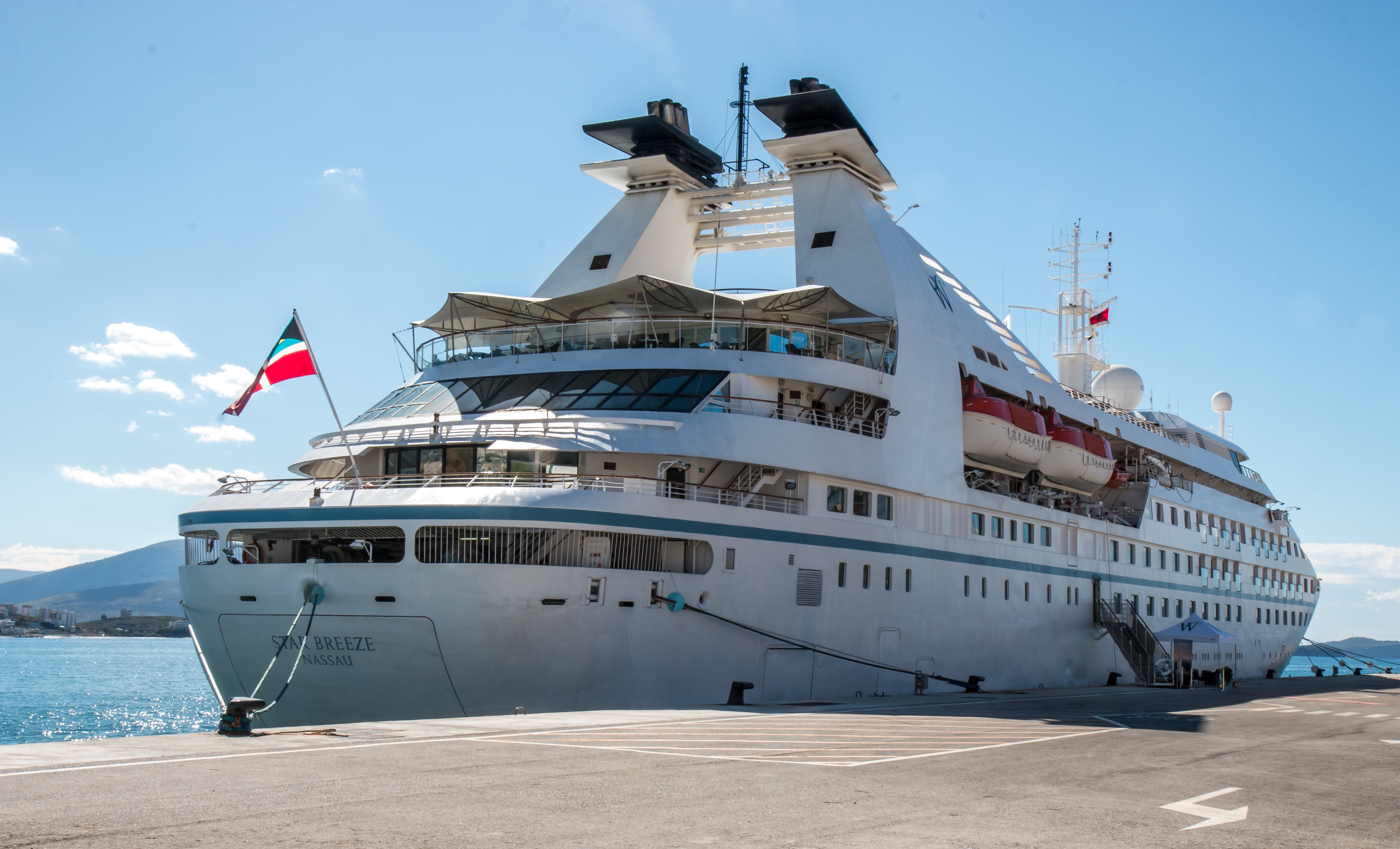
The Star Breeze Cruise ship in the Port of Sarandë

Given its coastal access and Mediterranean climate, Sarandë has become an important tourist attraction since the fall of communism in Albania. Saranda as well as the rest of the Albanian Riviera, according to The Guardian, "is set to become the new undiscovered gem of the overcrowded Med." Tourism is thus the major economic resource, while other resources include services, fisheries and construction. The unemployment rate according to the population census of 2008 was 8.32%. It has been suggested that family tourism and seasonal work during the summer period help mitigate the real unemployment rate. Recently, the town has experienced an uncontrolled construction boom which may hamper the city's future tourism potential. Since 2012, the Port of Saranda is undergoing an expansion to accommodate cruise ships at its terminal.

=== Tourism ===
Sarandë is viewed as the unofficial capital of the Albanian Riviera, and can be used as a base for excursions along it.

The region is prosperous with varied attractions and activities relating to nature and wildlife. Notable sights include the ancient archaeological site of Butrint and the Blue Eye Spring. Ksamil is notable for its beaches and islets.

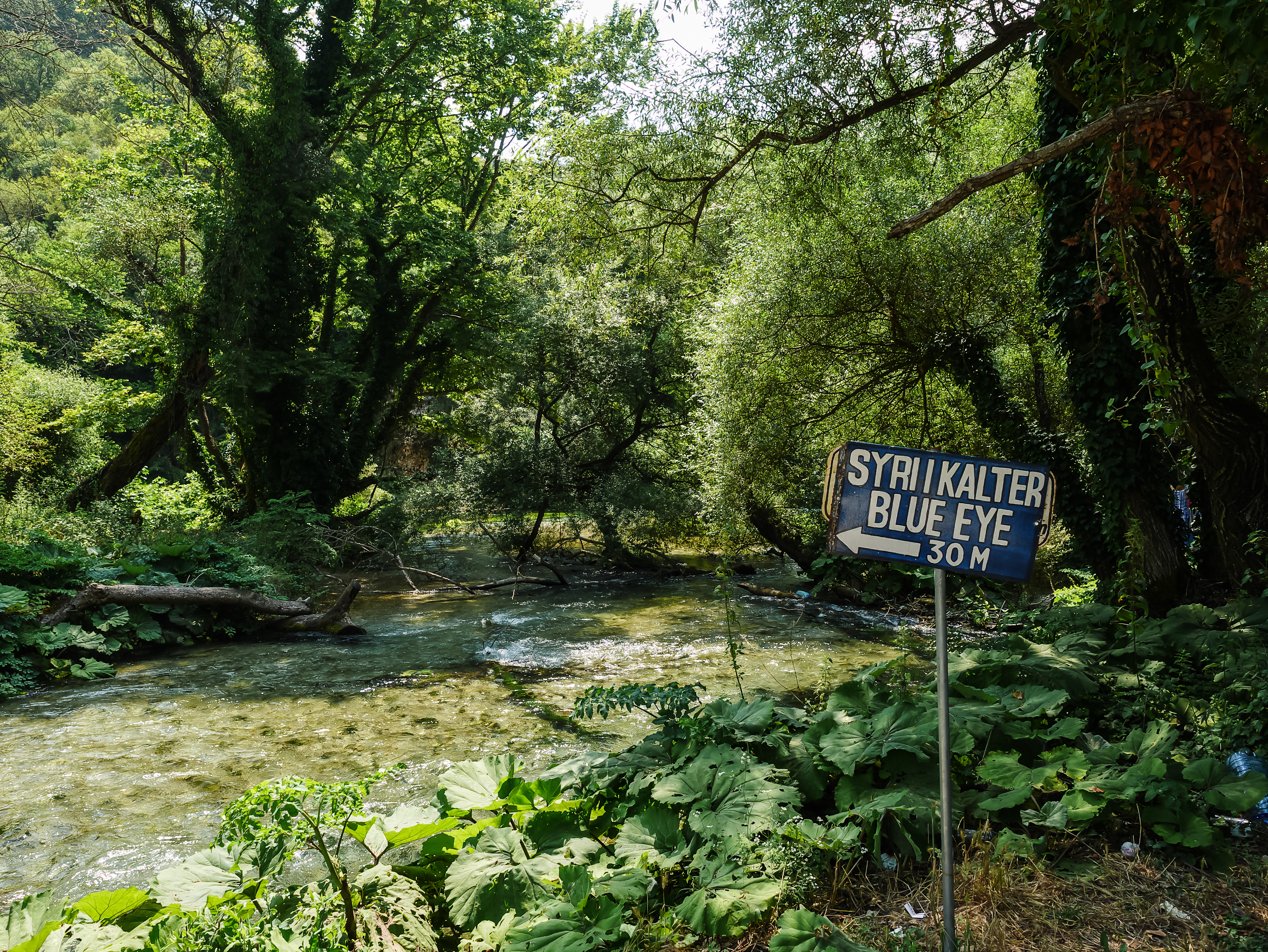
The Blue Eye Spring

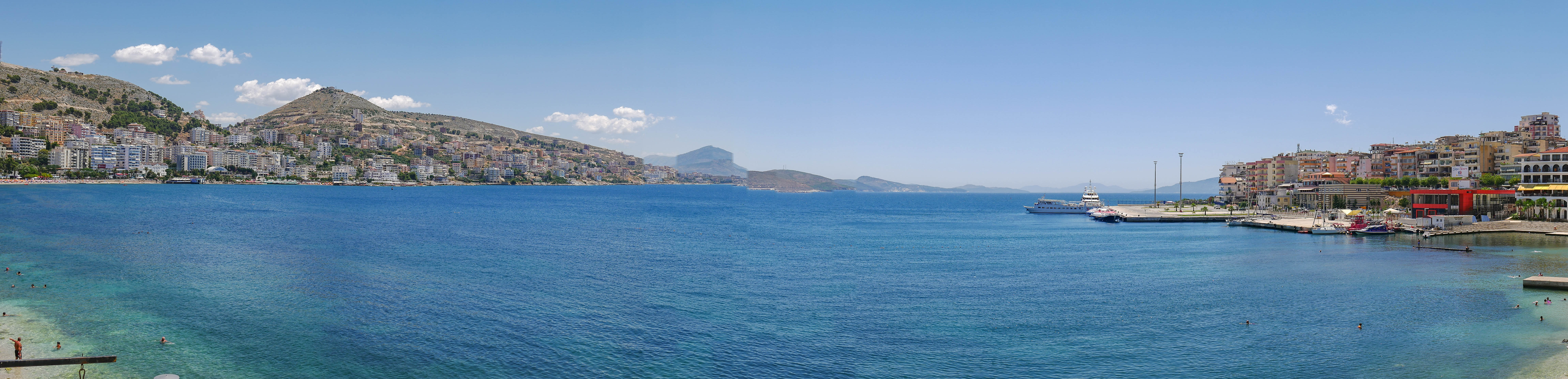
The view over the city and the Port of Sarandë

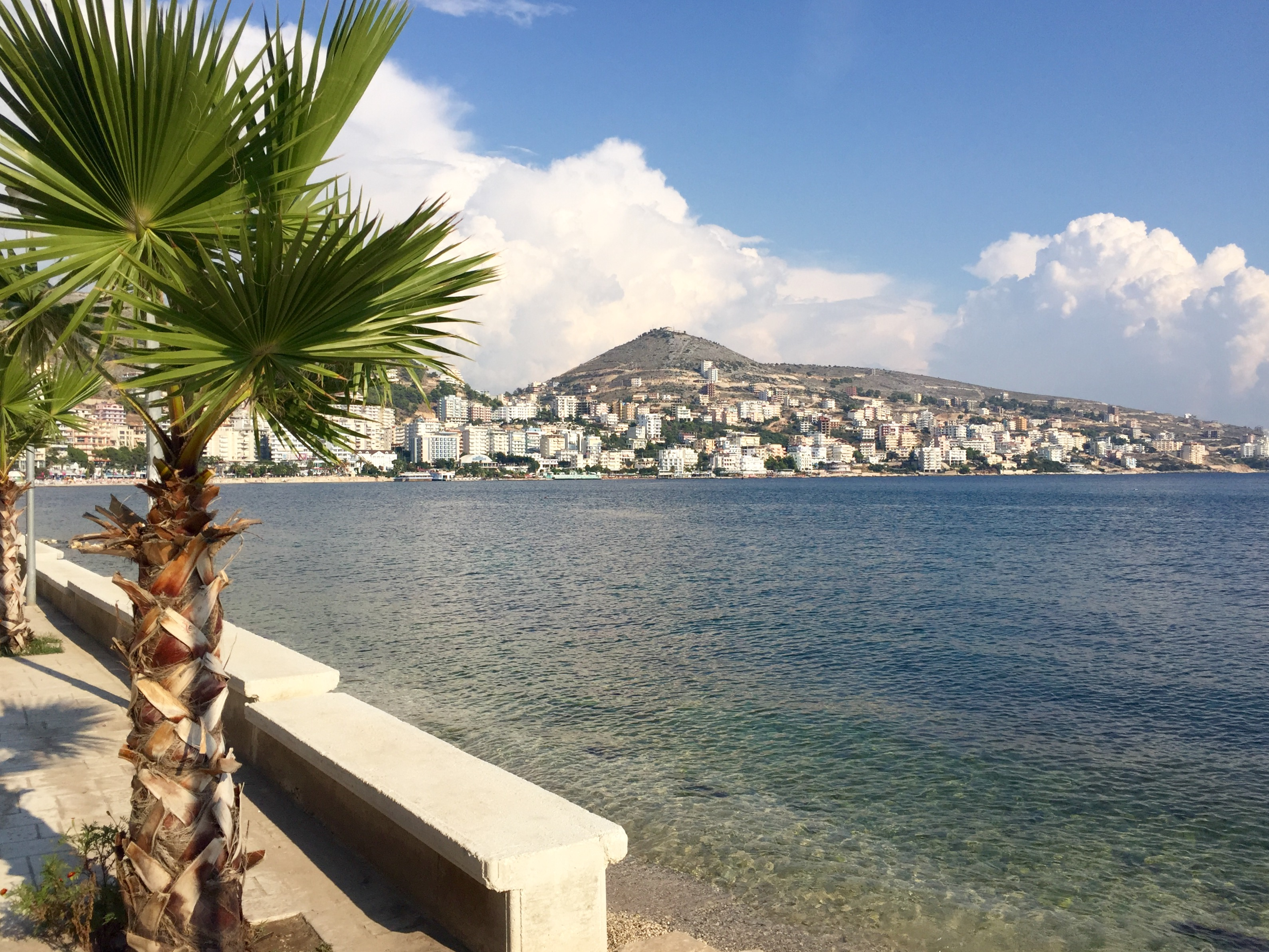
Promenade with the beach

Sarandë has developed into a major hub for international tourism along the Albanian Riviera. In a 2026 report by travel publication Travel Off Path, the city was ranked as Europe's most affordable beach destination for the summer season, outperforming comparable coastal locations in terms of value for accommodation, dining, and cultural attractions.

While the region has experienced a significant growth in visitor numbers—approaching levels seen in established Mediterranean destinations in Italy and Croatia—pricing has remained relatively budget-friendly. As of 2026, standard tourist expenses in the area include:

- Accommodation: Budget guesthouses and hotels average approximately $20 per night, while upscale beachfront properties and apartments average $120 per night.
- Dining: Mid-range three-course meals for two people typically range between $40 and $55, with casual dining options averaging around $5.
- Amenities: Daily rental for a standard beach set (consisting of one umbrella and two sun loungers) at nearby Ksamil averages around $10.

The city also serves as the primary gateway to the Butrint National Park, a UNESCO World Heritage Site. The archaeological complex, which features an ancient Greco-Roman amphitheater, remains a highly accessible cultural attraction with an entry fee of approximately $11.

International travel indices reflect a stable safety profile for the city and broader municipality. The United States Department of State classifies Albania as a Level 2 destination (consistent with Western European countries such as France and Italy), and the country holds a score of 83 out of 100 on the global Traveler Safety Index.

== Demographics ==
Historical population
Year	Pop.	±%
1950	1,495	—
1960	6,043	+304.2%
1969	7,400	+22.5%
1979	10,900	+47.3%
1989	15,673	+43.8%
2001	15,259	−2.6%
2011	17,233	+12.9%
2023	19,882	+15.4%

During the late Ottoman period until the Balkan Wars (1912–1913) Sarandë consisted of only a harbour and was without permanent residents. In 1912, right after the Albanian Declaration of Independence, the settlement had only 110 inhabitants. At the 1927 census, it had 810 inhabitants, but was not yet a town. In the 1930s, it had a good demographic development, and it is in this period that the first public buildings and the main roads were constructed. In 1957, the city had 8,700 inhabitants and was made the center of a district. The population of Sarandë was exclusively Christian. A Muslim community was settled in the city as part of the resettlement policies during the People's Republic of Albania (1945–1991). The total population is 20,227 (2011 census), (Note: The municipality of Sarandë consists of the administrative units of Ksamil and Sarandë. The population of the municipality results from the sum of the listed administrative units in the former as of the 2011 Albanian census.) in a total area of 70.13 km^{2}. The population of the former municipality at the 2011 census was 17,233. The population according to the civil offices, which record all citizens including those living abroad, is 41,173 (2013 estimate).

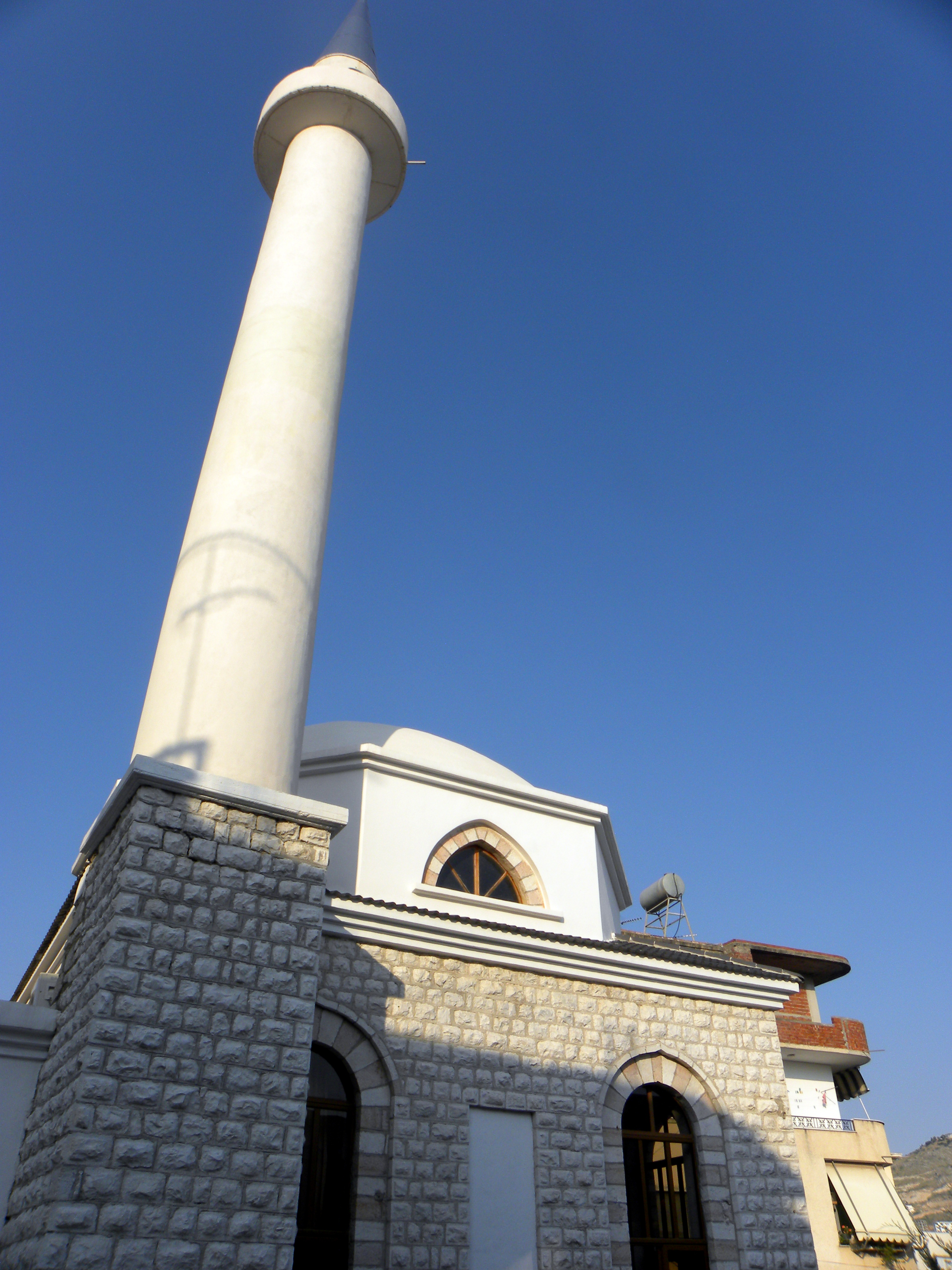
Mosque of Sarandë

According to a survey by the Albanian Helsinki Committee, in 1990 Sarandë numbered 17,000 inhabitants, of whom 7,500 belonged to the Greek minority. The members of the Greek minority of the city, prior to the collapse of the socialist regime (1991), were deprived from their minority rights, since Sarandë did not belong to the "minority areas". In fieldwork undertaken by Greek scholar Leonidas Kallivretakis in the area during 1992 noted that Saranda's mixed ethno-linguistic composition (total population in 1992: 17,555) consisted of 8,055 Muslim Albanians, 6,500 Greeks and an Orthodox Albanian population of 3,000. Statistics from the same study showed that, including the surround villages, Sarande commune had a population consisting of 43% Albanian Muslims, 14% Albanian Christians, 41% Greek Christians, and 2% Aromanian Christians. In the early 1990s, the local Orthodox Albanian population mainly voted for political parties of the Greek minority based in the Saranda area.

Sarandë is considered one of the two centers of the Greek minority in Albania, Gjirokastër being the other. According to the representatives of the Greek minority 42% of the town's population belong to the local Greek community. Since the 1990s the population of Sarandë has nearly doubled. According to official estimation in 2013, the population of the city is 41,173. According to a survey conducted by the Albanian Committee of Helsinki, in 2001 the Albanian population numbered about 26,500, while Greeks formed the rest with about 3,400 alongside a small number of Vlachs and Roma. The city, according to the Albanian Committee of Helsinki, has lost more than half of its ethnic Greeks from 1991 to 2001, because of heavy emigration to Greece. According to official estimates of 2014 the number of the Greek community in the former municipality is 7,920, not to count those who live in the wider current municipality (including additionally 4,207 in Ksamil). Two schools/classes in Greek attended by a total of 217 students existed in the Saranda municipality as of 2014. Other minorities include Aromanians, Roma and Ashkali.

== Notable people ==
- Ardit Bido
- Floida Kërpaçi
- Antonia Stergiou
- Luiza Xhuvani

== International relations ==
Sarandë is twinned with:

- Corfu, Greece (2001)
- Otranto, Italy (2012)
- Gjakova, Kosovo (2013)
- Suva Reka, Kosovo (2012)
- Stavroupoli, Greece
- Larnaca, Cyprus (1994)
- Riccione, Italy (1992)
