= Agathius =

Christian saint (died 303)

Saint Acacius
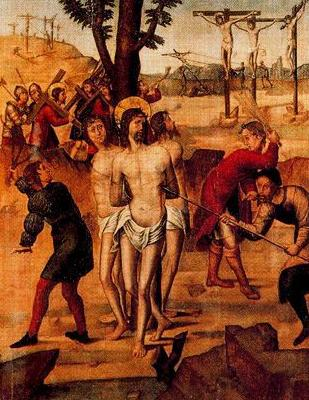
- The Martyrdom of Saint Agathius. 16th century work by an anonymous artist from Toledo.

Holy Helper, Martyr
- Born: late-3rd century Cappadocia
- Died: c. 303; Byzantium
- Venerated in: Roman Catholic Church; Eastern Orthodox Church
- Major shrine: Cathedral of Squillace, Italy
- Feast: 7 May (formerly 8 May); 16 January (translation of relics)
- Attributes: palm of martyrdom, centurion with a bunch of thorns, in armour with standard and shield, depicted with Theodore of Amasea
- Patronage: soldiers, Squillace, Guardavalle, invoked against headache

Agathius of Byzantium (Greek: Ἅγιος Ἀκάκιος; died 303), also known as Agathonas, Achatius, or Saint Acacius according to Christian tradition, was a Cappadocian Greek centurion of the imperial army, martyred around 304. A church existed in Constantinople associated with Acacius and possibly named after him: the Church of St Acacius.

== History ==
Agathius was arrested on charges for being a Christian by Tribune Firmus in Perinthus, Thrace, tortured and then brought to Byzantium where he was scourged and beheaded, being made a martyr because he would not renounce his Christian faith.

The date of his martyrdom is traditionally 8 May, when his feast was observed. It was later moved to 7 May.

== Veneration ==
His relics were relocated c. 630 to a spring at Squillace, close by the Vivarium, the monastery founded in the previous century by Cassiodorus in the heel of Italy. He was known in Squillace as San Agario. A relic of his arm was brought to Guardavalle in 1584 by the bishop of Squillace, Marcello Sirleto, hence Agathius' patronage of this city. Relics from Squillace were also brought to Cuenca and Ávila in Spain, where he is known as San Acato.

Agathius is also venerated in Slovenia, where numerous churches and chapels are dedicated to him; this popular veneration goes back to the 16th century, when he was considered the patron saint of the fighters against the Ottoman Turks. For the same reason he became popular among the Maniots, inhabitants of the Mani Peninsula in Greece, who took up his confrontation of the Pagan Roman authorities as a symbol of their own long lasting resistance of the Ottoman Empire's rule.

Achatius is one of the Fourteen Holy Helpers or Auxiliary Saints in Roman Catholic tradition.
