= Romanian Institute in Albania =

Romanian concession in Sarandë Concesiunea română din Saranda (Romanian)
- 1934–1939
- Flag Coat of arms
- Capital: Sarandë
- Historical era: Interwar period
  - Donation of the territory to the Romanian state: 13 August 1934
  - Italian invasion of Albania: 7 April 1939
Preceded by	Succeeded by
Albanian Kingdom	Italian protectorate of Albania
- Today part of: Albania

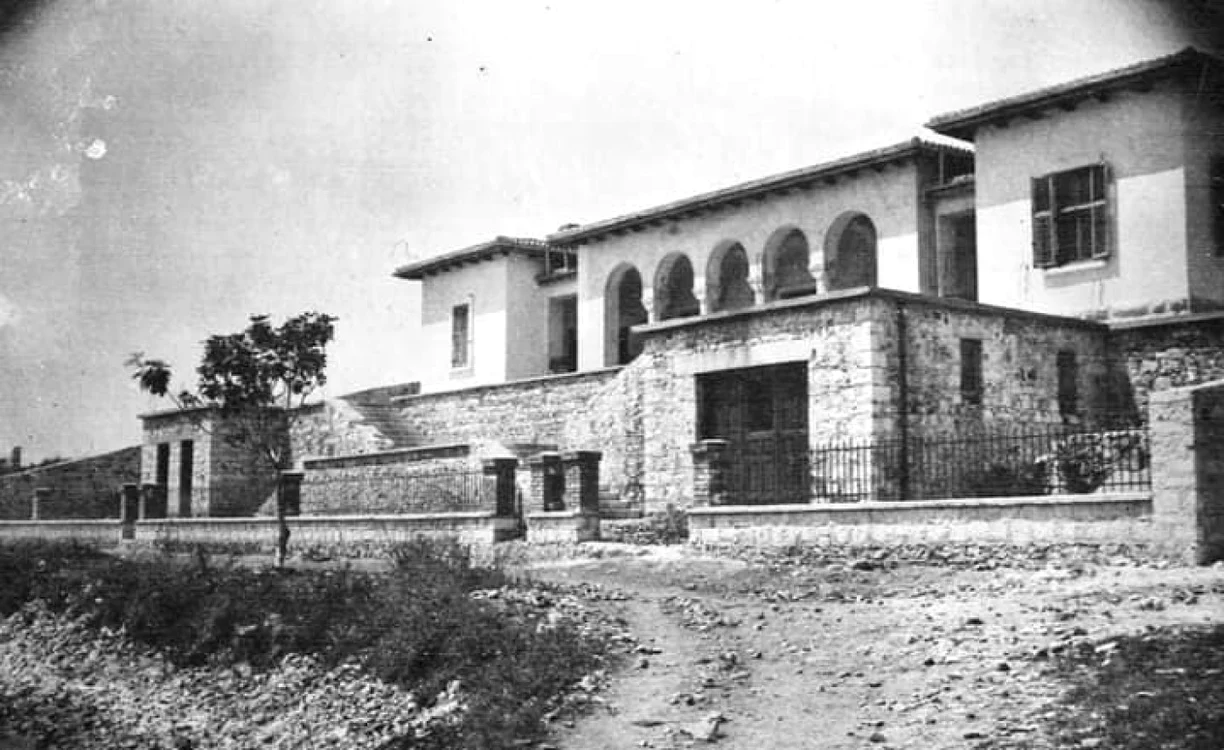
The Institute in Sarandë (1937)

The Romanian Institute in Albania (Romanian: Institutul român din Albania), formally the Romanian Institute for Archaeological Research and Studies (Romanian: Institutul român de studii și cercetări arheologice), was a scientific organization in the Albanian town of Sarandë, subordinated to the Romanian Ministry of Education between 25 July 1938 and 1 November 1940. The institute was meant to coordinate archaeological excavations conducted by Romanian teams in agreement with the Albanian state.

A 746-square-metre (8,030 sq ft) parcel of land on the Adriatic coast was donated in April 1932 by King Zog of Albania to the Romanian historian and politician Nicolae Iorga, in recognition for the latter's entire scholarly activity on Albanian history. Under Iorga's patronage, a Romanian Scientific Mission in Albania was created on 13 July 1934 to perform "philological, ethnographical, archaeological and historical research". Consequently, on 13 August 1934, Iorga donated half of this land in Sarandë to the Romanian state to serve as the Mission's headquarters. As the parcel was deemed too small for the projected edifice, new requests were made to the Albanian Royal Family and to the Albanian Red Cross for further donations. Ultimately, on 21 September 1937, another 680 m^{2} (7,300 sq ft) were donated personally to Nicolae Iorga.

The foundations of the Mission's building were laid in a ceremony on 9 November 1936; however actual construction work only began in July 1937, based on the plans of Romanian architect Petre Antonescu. Due to lack of funds, the projected second floor was never built, and the length of its facade was reduced to two thirds.

The institute was formally created on 25 July 1938, however its building was finalised only in the spring of 1939. The Italian invasion of Albania in April 1939 prevented the institute from functioning in the new building, and thus its secretary, Dumitru Berciu, had to entrust the building and the parcel to the Sarandë township. The Institute itself was formally disbanded on 1 November 1940. After Italian attempts to buy the building in November 1940 failed, the building was confiscated and converted into a military hospital. Through the efforts of Berciu, the institute was formally re-established on 13 May 1943, without any actual activity taking place in Albania, soon to be placed under German occupation. Berciu continued to perform administrative tasks related to the Institute at least until February 1944, and in 1945 he published a lecture on the Paleolithic and Mesolithic in the Balkans using the institute's title on the cover page. The building was confiscated by the Albanian state in the years following World War II, and became private property after 1990, with the Romanian Ministry of Foreign Affairs making a formal claim in the 2010s.
