= Forty Saints Monastery =

Monastery in Sarandë, Albania

Monastery of the Forty Saint Martyrs
- Rrënojat e Manastirit të 40 Shenjtorëve; Ιερά Μονή των Αγίων Σαράντα Μαρτύρων (in Greek)
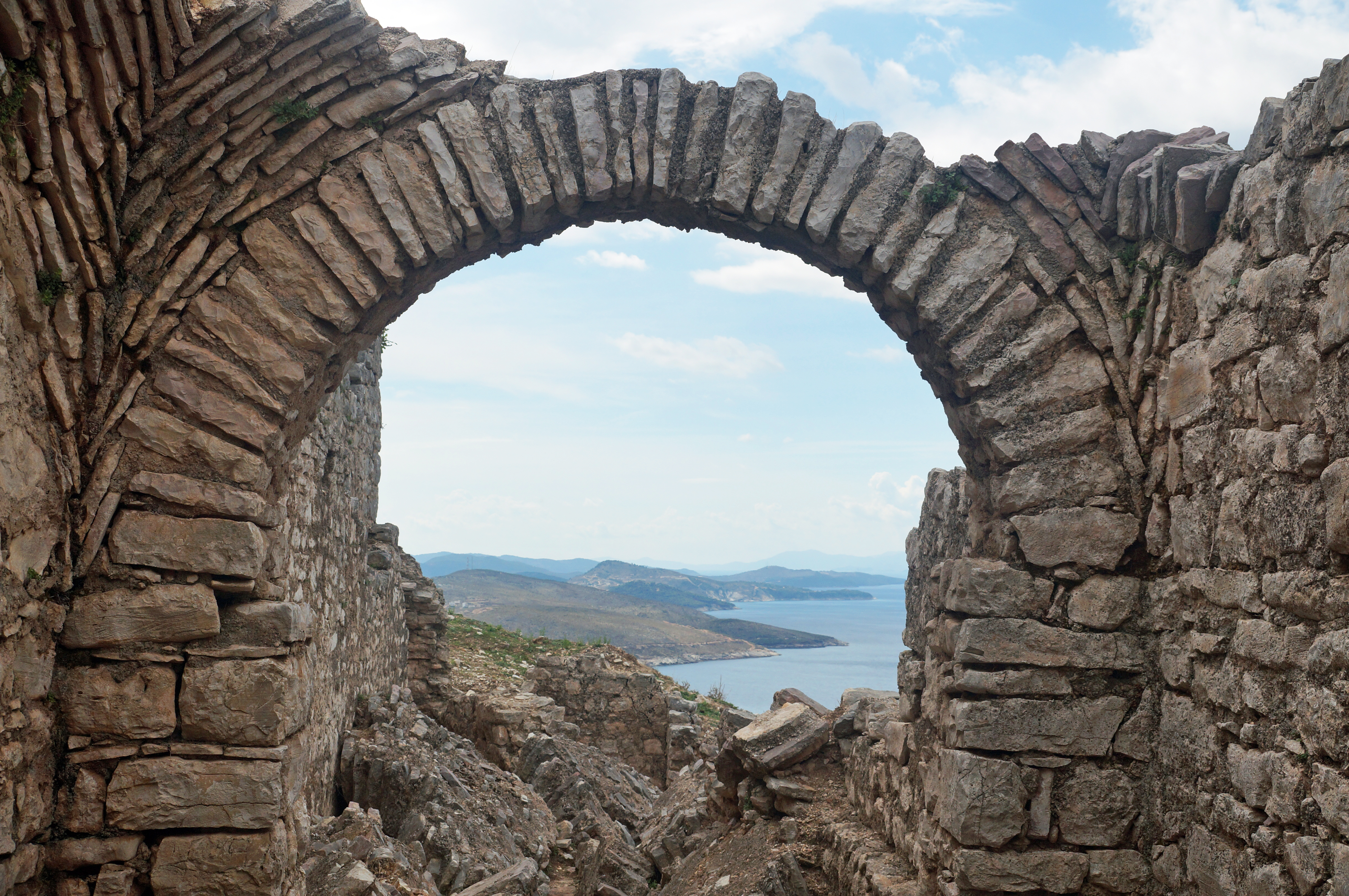

- Location within Albania Location within Balkans

Religion
- Affiliation: Eastern Orthodox
- Ecclesiastical or organizational status: ruined

Location
- Location: Sarandë, Vlorë County, Albania
- Interactive map of Monastery of the Forty Saint Martyrs
- Coordinates: 39°52′20″N 20°01′18″E

Architecture
- Style: Early Byzantine (basilica)
- Founder: Justinian I
- Completed: 6th century AD
- Cultural Monument of Albania

The Monastery of the Forty Saint Martyrs (Albanian: Manastiri i 40 Shenjtorëve, Greek: Ιερά Μονή των Αγιών Σαράντα Μαρτύρων, Iera Moni ton Agion Saranta Martyron) is a ruined Eastern Orthodox monastery overlooking the coastal city of Sarandë in southern Albania. The monastery was erected during the 6th century AD and possibly became for at least one millennium the most important pilgrimage site in the Ionian Sea region. The name of the monastery (Agioi Saranta in Greek meaning Forty Saints) was transferred to the adjacent city of Onchesmos. During the People's Republic of Albania (1944-1991) the site was transformed into a military installation. Today only a part of the side walls of its basilica type church survive.

== History ==
The monastery was probably founded during the reign of Byzantine Emperor Justinian (527–565 AD) and remained a shrine until the communist era in Albania (1944-1991). The complex of the monastery included the basilica church as well as hostels for pilgrims and other guests, underground chambers, holy water springs and crypts. In the underground rooms there were a total of forty small chapels, each dedicated to one of the Forty Martyrs of Sebaste who were martyred during the Early Christian period. During the High Middle Ages the name of the monastery was transferred to the nearby coastal city of Onchesmos. The latter developed into the modern settlement of Sarandë.

The monastery remained a major pilgrimage site until the 14th-15th centuries when it suffered repeated destruction due to the Ottoman conquest of the region. However, it attracted again renewed attention in the 18th-19th centuries. The basilica was abandoned and fell into ruins in early 20th century, but part of its high walls were still standing as seen in photographs dating from the early 1930s. The roofless church remained a place of annual religious celebrations on each 9 March. Additionally, a small number of monks appear to be active that time there.

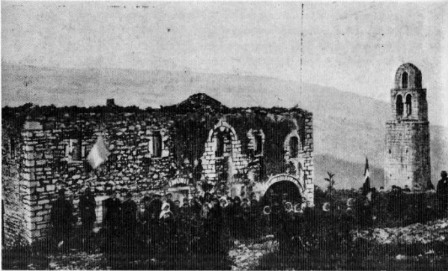
Early 20th century picture of the basilica and the bell tower

During World War II (1944) the monument witnessed devastating destruction and was reduced to shattered ruins: it was either destroyed by German artillery or Allied aircraft. In the 1950s it was demolished during the atheistic campaign launched by the authorities of the People's Republic of Albania. The site was transformed into a military base, a fact that prevented the preservation of the monument. It remained as such until the 1997 Albanian civil unrest.

Much of the massive structure of the basilica has long been demolished today with only parts of its side walls still standing. However, it still retains some religious importance for the local Greek Orthodox population and pilgrims continue to leave flowers there.

== Architecture ==
The church of the monastery was the largest basilica type church in the region and was comparable to those of the episcopal see at Nicopolis. The main structure of the church seems indicative of late antique Christian architecture while it shares parallels to the seven apsed banqueting hall of the palace of Lausos in Constantinople built in c. 530-550 AD.

The basilica was a building of rectangular shape with a single apse, exonarthex and esonarthex, as well as two small exterior tower structures. The interior included a total of six apsidal chambers. Each one was probably roofed either by domes or half domes as indicated by the pilasters that divide them. Traces of paintings dating from late antiquity appear in at least one chamber. Those depictions include two figures with haloes holding open books and a painted arcade. A crypt is located in the western part of the structure.

A number of dedicatory Greek inscriptions made of broken tile and potsherds have been unearthed on the sides of the structure with some of them dating from the 5th and 6th centuries.

== Excavations ==
In 1913 Greek archaeologist Demetrios Evangelides undertook a survey and excavations at the monastery. During the 1920s Italian archaeologist Luigi Maria Ugolini published the first research about the basilica of the monastery in which he mentioned it as among the finest religious monuments he had studied in Albania. A survey conducted in recent years offers details about its changing architectural styles in addition to its crypts and decoration.

== Sources ==
- Bowden, Will (2015). "Gazetteer of Late Antique Sites in Epirus Vetus". academia.edu.
- Giakoumis, Geōrgios K.; Vlassas, Grēgorēs; Hardy, David A. (1996). Monuments of Orthodoxy in Albania. Doukas School. ISBN 978-960-7203-09-0.
- Hodges, Richard; Mitchell, John (2014). "The Forty Saints Reconsidered" (PDF). Expedition Magazine: Penn Museum. 56 (3). University of Pennsylvania Museum of Anthropoloy and Archaeology: 38–44.
- Hodges, Richard (2017). Travels with an Archaeologist: Finding a Sense of Place. Bloomsbury Publishing. ISBN 978-1-350-01266-0.
- Hodges, Richard (2007). Saranda, Ancient Onchesmos: A Short History and Guide. Migjeni Publishing House. ISBN 978-99943-943-6-4.
