= Acacius of Sebaste =

4th-century priest and saint

Saint Acasius
- Born: 3rd century Sebaste, Armenia (modern-day Sivas, Turkey)
- Died: c. 304
- Venerated in: Eastern Orthodox Church
- Feast: 27 November; 28 November

Saint Acacius of Sebaste (Greek: Ἅγιος Ἀκάκιος Σεβαστείας; died c. 304) was a 4th-century Christian priest and hieromartyr who lived in Sebaste, Armenia, during the Diocletianic Persecution.

== Biography ==
Under the governor Maximus (284–305) seven women and two children were brought to justice in Sebaste. The women were accused of having tempted their husbands to become Christians. They did not lose their dignity even under the harsh torture. One of the executioners, Irenarchus, was so impressed by their attitude to their faith that he joined them. It was the priest Acacius who administered the baptism of Irenarchus. All of them suffered of torture and were killed by the sword or the stake.

== Veneration ==
They are venerated in the Eastern Orthodox Church and their feast day is on 27 November.

This Acacius should not be confused with the soldier Acacius, one of the Forty Martyrs of Sebaste.
