= Floida Kërpaçi =

Albanian politician

Member of the Albanian parliament
- Incumbent
- Assumed office September 2017

Personal details
- Party: Socialist Movement for Integration

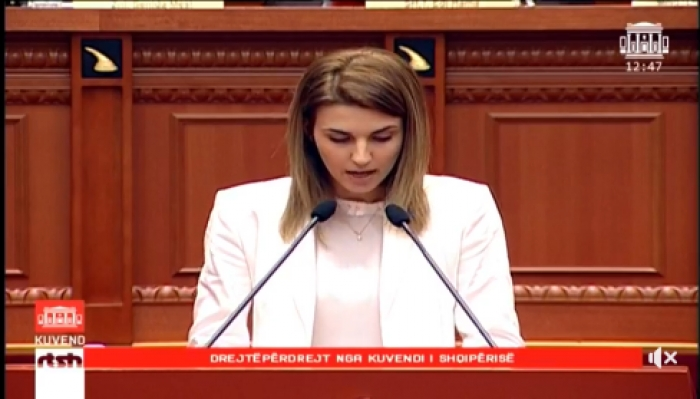
Floida Kërpaçi speaking at an assembly

Floida Kërpaçi is an Albanian politician, member of the Socialist Movement for Integration (Albanian: Lëvizja Socialiste për Integrim, LSI). Kerpaci is currently the Chairwoman of Youth Movement for Integration (Albanian: Lëvizjes Rinore për Integrim, LRI).

Kerpaci was born on May 17, 1994, in Saranda, Albania. Since 2013, she has been studying at the University of Medicine, Tirana, Faculty of Pharmacy.

== Politics ==
After various engagements in youth organizations, she started her political career in 2012, joining the Youth Movement for Integration. Kërpaçi has served as member of the Tirana City Council for 2 years, elected for the first time in the local elections of 2015. In June 2016, she was elected Chairwoman of the Youth Movement for Integration. Mrs. Kërpaçi is a member of the National Committee and Leadership of the Socialist Movement for Integration since June 2016. In December 2016, she was elected Chairwoman of the Alliance of Young Councilors in the Municipality of Tirana. Kërpaçi is currently serving as Member of Parliament, in the Albanian Parliament, elected in the general elections the country held on June 25, 2017.
