= Church of St Acacius =

Former church in Constantinople

The Church of St Acacius was an early Christian church in Constantinople (modern-day Istanbul, Turkey). It may have been dedicated to a military saint and martyr of the Diocletianic Persecution, Saint Acacius (d. 10 May 305), or it may have acquired its name from a comes Acacius, an official under the augustus Constantine the Great (r. 306–337).

The Church of St Acacius was one of the earliest churches of Constantinople, the city which Constantine founded in 328 in the city of Byzantium after his and his son, the caesar Crispus's, victory at the Battle of Chrysopolis over the augustus Licinius. The church is known to have been associated with the name Acacius from the early 5th century at latest.

== History ==
In the 5th century, the church is mentioned in the Ecclesiastical History of Socrates of Constantinople, written c. 439, which treats of an incident in the preceding century: the city's bishop, Macedonius I of Constantinople (r. 341–360) angered the ruling augustus Constantius II (r. 337–361) by moving the sarcophagus of his father Constantine out of its place in the Mausoleum of Constantine at the Church of the Holy Apostles and into the Church of St Acacius. The later Ecumenical Patriarch of Constantinople, John Chrysostom (r. 398–404), is known to have preached two sermons in the church whose texts survive in the Clavis Patrum Graecorum, entitled In illud Quia quod stultum est dei (CPG 4441.14), which was apparently preached "in the church of Acacius the martyr" (Patristic Greek: ἐν τῇ ἐκκλησίᾳ τῇ ἐπὶ Ἀκακίον τὸν μάρτυρα), and In martres omnes (CPG 4441.15), whose original setting was "in the temple of the holy Acacius" (ἐν τῷ ναῷ τοῦ ἁγίου μάρτυρος Ἀκακίου). According to Socrates, the augustus Arcadius (r. 383–408) visited a chapel dedicated to Saint Acacius where a walnut tree stood, on which the martyr was supposed to have been hanged. It is not clear whether this "chapel" (οἰκίσκος) is the same as the Church of St Acacius Socrates refers to elsewhere. In Socrates's account, when the emperor visited the building unexpectedly collapsed, but since the crowds gathered outside to meet him in the courtyard where the tree grew, no-one was harmed.

According to the Syriac Breviary, whose manuscript dates from 411 and whose text was composed at Nicomedia c. 362, the Saint Acacius in question was martyred at Nicomedia. The Martyrologium Hieronymianum dating to c. 341 – c. 351 and purportedly, but pseudepigraphically, written by Jerome, states that he was martyred at Constantinople. A Greek passio about Acacius also places his martyrdom by beheading and his burial at Constantinople.

According to David Woods, the martyrdom of Acacius probably took place at Nicomedia on 10 May 305, but this person had nothing to do with the foundation of the Church of St Acacius at Constantinople. Rather, Woods argues that someone named Acacius had sponsored the building of the church, which subsequently bore his name and was then conflated with the martyr. Woods identifies the comes Acacius, a confidant of Constantine and a Christian, as the most likely candidate. This Acacius's existence is recorded by Eusebius of Caesarea's Vita Constantini, a posthumous biography of Constantine, and possibly by the Codex Theodosianus, a collection of laws and rescripts compiled in the reign of Theodosius II (r. 402–450). The Vita Constantini preserves a letter purportedly written by Constantine to Acacius, addressing him as "most distinguished count (comes) and friend" and despatching him to Mamre in Palestine to replace the existing places of worship there with a Christian building. The Codex Theodosianus mentions one Acacius as holding the office of comes Macedoniae in 327. Because nothing is known about this official's death, it may be that he was executed in the purge of Constantine's family members and allies after the emperor's death in 337; Woods proposes that he may have been the Acacius hanged from the walnut tree later inspected by Arcadius.
