= Guardavalle =

- Comune
- Comune di Guardavalle
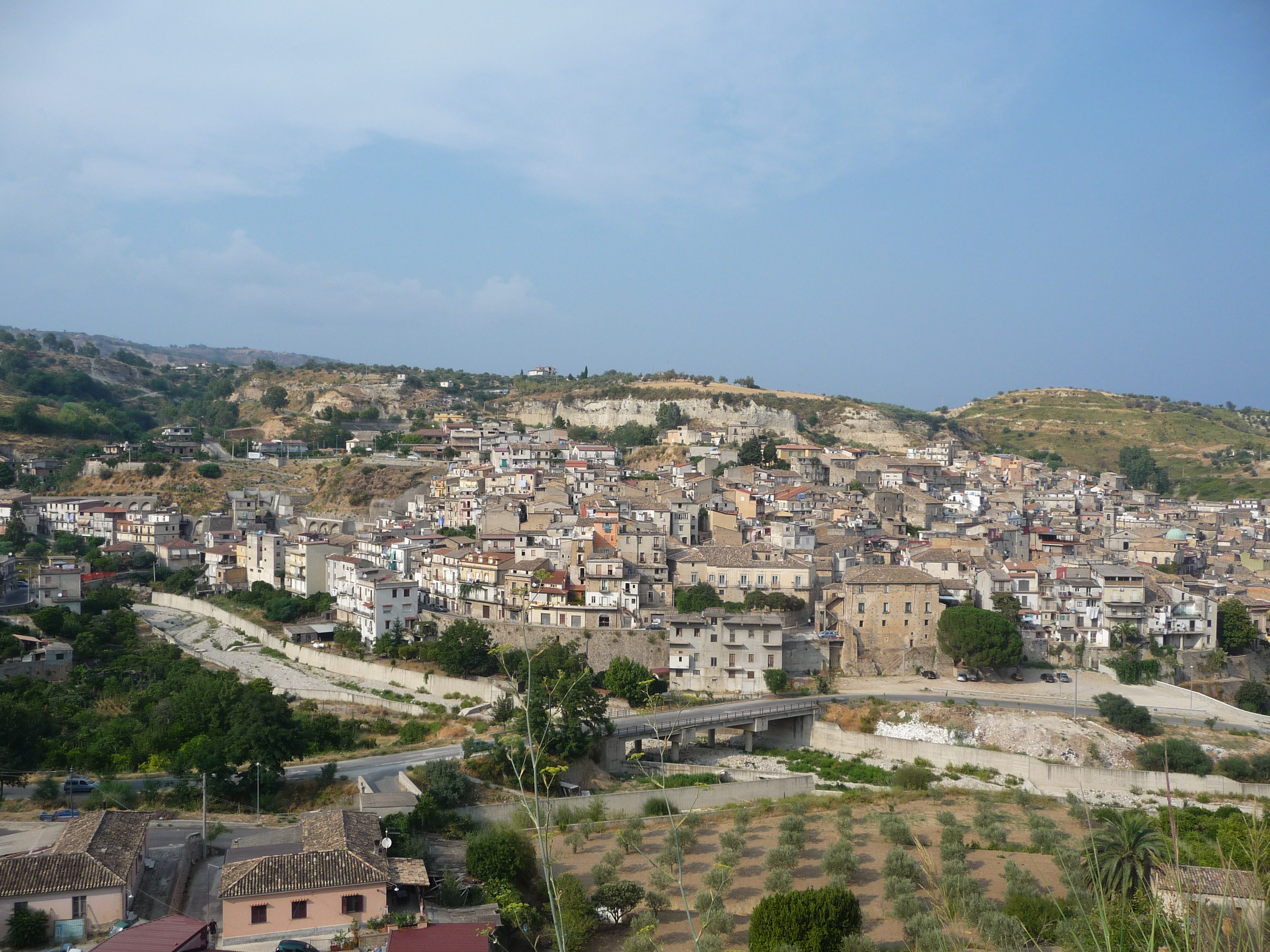
- Landscape of Guardavalle superiore

- Location within Italy Location within Calabria
- Coordinates: 38°30′N 16°30′E
- Country: Italy
- Region: Calabria
- Province: Catanzaro (CZ)
- Frazioni: Elce della Vecchia, Guardavalle Marina, S. Giorgio, Elce della Vecchia, Pietracupa, Pietrarotta, S. Stefano, Sciordillà

Area
  - Total: 60.4 km^{2} (23.3 sq mi)
- Elevation: 225 m (738 ft)

Population (31 December 2013)
  - Total: 4,685
  - Density: 77.6/km^{2} (201/sq mi)
- Demonym: Guardavallesi
- Time zone: UTC+1 (CET)
  - Summer (DST): UTC+2 (CEST)
- Postal code: 88065
- Dialing code: 0967
- Patron saint: Sant'Agazio
- Saint day: 7 May
- Website: Official website

Guardavalle (Calabrian: Guardavaji) is a comune and town in the province of Catanzaro in the Calabria region of Italy.
