= Acacius (curator) =

Byzantine imperial curator

Acacius (Greek: Ἀκάκιος) was a Byzantine imperial curator, active in the late reign of Justinian I (r. 527–565). He is known for his role in a civil disorder incident of the 560s. The main source about him is a fragment of John Malalas.

== Biography ==
Acacius was reportedly an imperial curator (Greek:βασιλικός κουράτωρ). His duties are not mentioned. He could have served as curator of a domus divina, thus being a vir illustris (high ranking senator), or he could have been a palace official.

Acacius is known to have had a daughter. When said daughter was raped, Acacius attempted to punish the suspected rapist. The rapist happened to be a member of the Green faction of chariot racing, and Acacius' actions led to a new conflict between the Greens and the Blues in the Pittacia district of Constantinople. The fragment can be safely dated to the 560s, dated to between 562 and 565. Malalas elsewhere mentions an incident taking place in Pittacia during October 562, but it is unknown if these incidents are connected.

== Sources ==
- Evans, James Allan Stewart (1996), The age of Justinian: the circumstances of imperial power, Routledge, ISBN 978-0-415-02209-5
- Martindale, John R., ed. (1992). The Prosopography of the Later Roman Empire: Volume III, AD 527–641. Cambridge: Cambridge University Press. ISBN 0-521-20160-8.
