= Joos van Ghistele =

Flemish nobleman who spent time travelling around the Middle East and southern Europe

Joos van Ghistele (ca. 1446 in Ghent – ca. 1525) was a Flemish nobleman who spent four years (1481–1485) travelling around in the Middle East and southern Europe, including Italy, Greece, the Balkans, Tunisia, the Levant, Egypt and the Red Sea all the way down to Aden.

His accounts were edited by Ambrosius Zeebout, priest, and posthumously published in 1557 as Tvoyage van Mher Joos van Ghistele, with many later republications. Three editions in Ghent alone (1557, 1563, 1572) in fifteen years show that the book attained considerable popularity in Flanders.

== See also ==
- John Mandeville
- Marco Polo
