= Acacia Park =

Acacia Park may refer to:

- Acacia Park, Cape Town, South Africa
- Acacia Park Cemetery, Norwood Park Township, Illinois
- Acacia Park Cemetery, Mendota Heights, Minnesota
