= Acacia Avenue =

Cliché in British culture

Acacia Avenue is a cliché in British culture. It is a placeholder name for an unexceptional middle-class suburban street. It is named for Acacia, a genus of evergreen trees and shrubs indigenous to Australia and New Guinea but grown ornamentally in the UK.

There are at least sixty Acacia Avenues in the United Kingdom, nine of them within Greater London.

In Canada, the residence of the Leader of the Official Opposition, Stornoway, is located on Acacia Avenue in Ottawa, Ontario.

== Gallery ==
Examples of real-life Acacia Avenues:

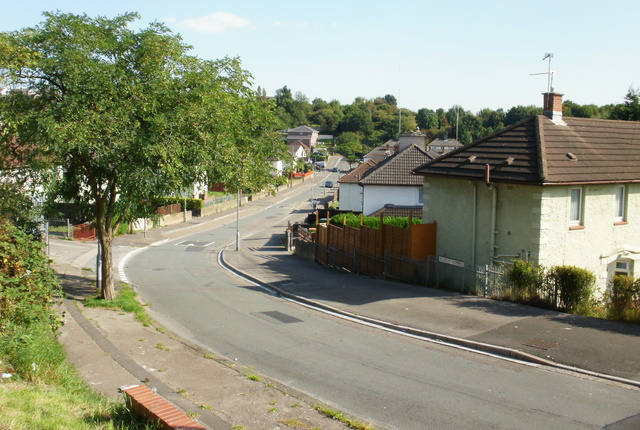
Acacia Avenue, Newport

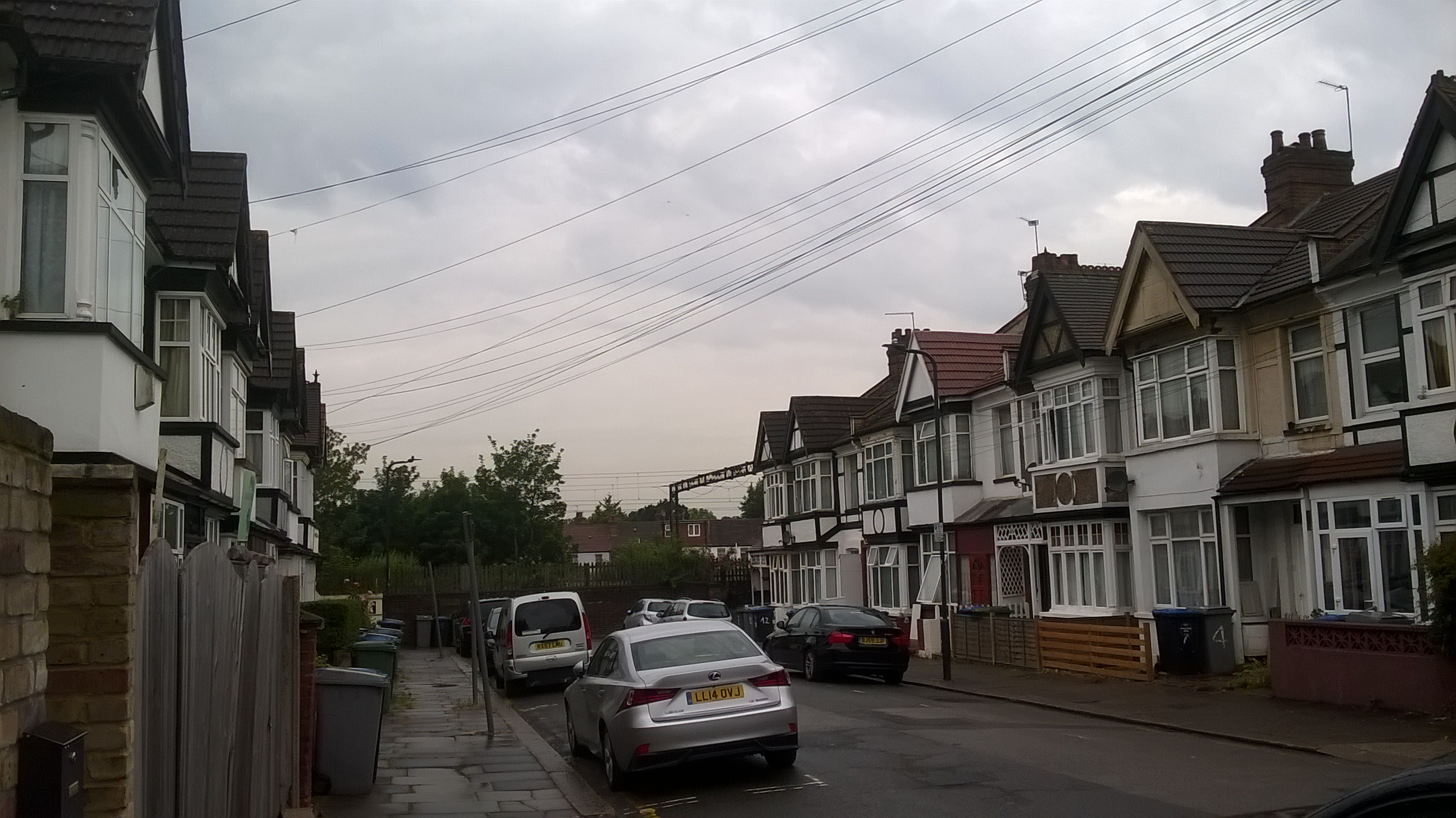
Acacia Avenue, Brent

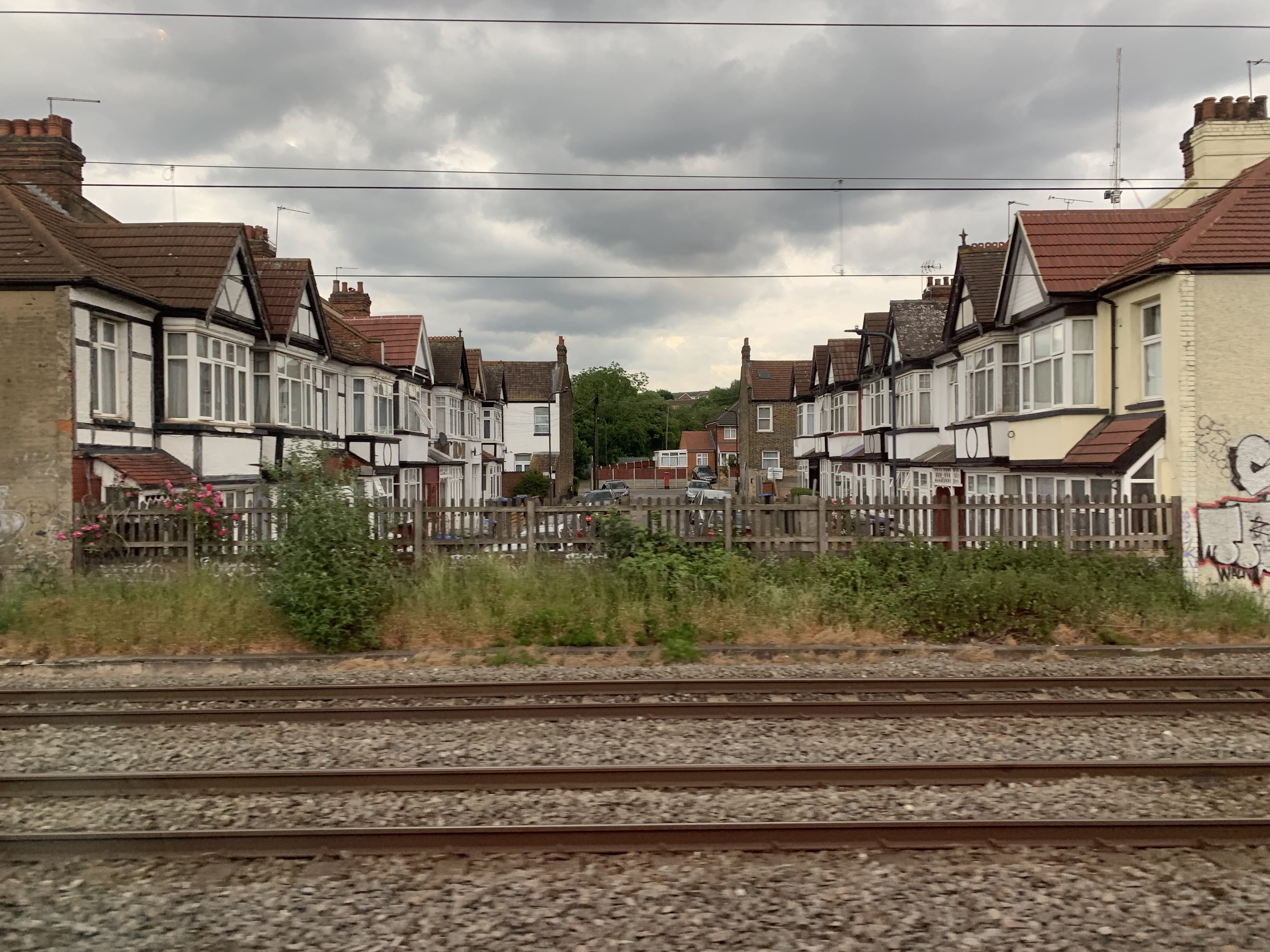
Acacia Avenue, Wembley

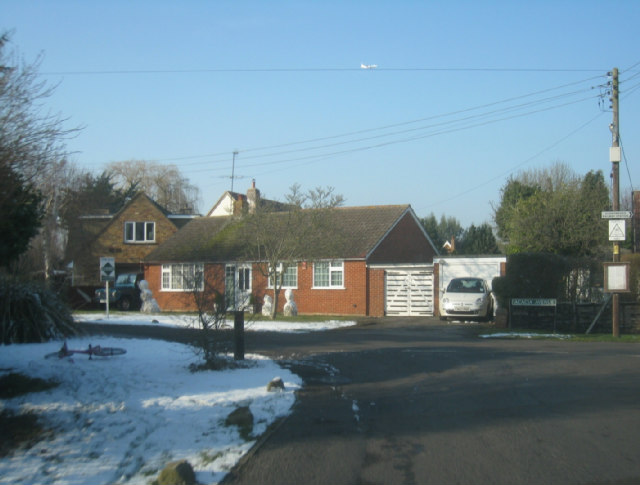
Acacia Avenue, Wraysbury

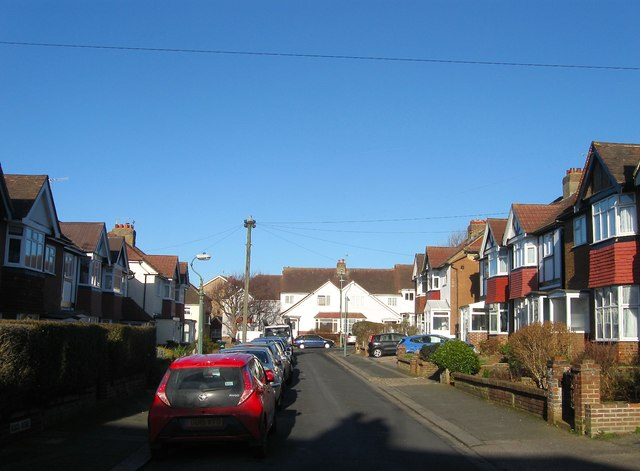
Acacia Avenue, Hove

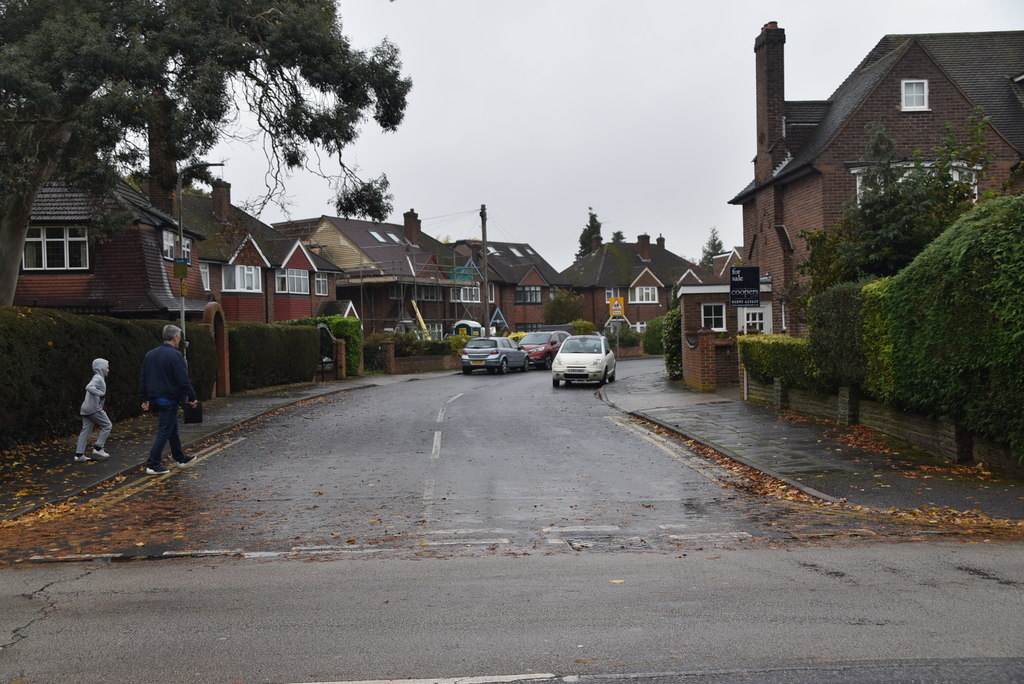
Acacia Avenue, Hillingdon

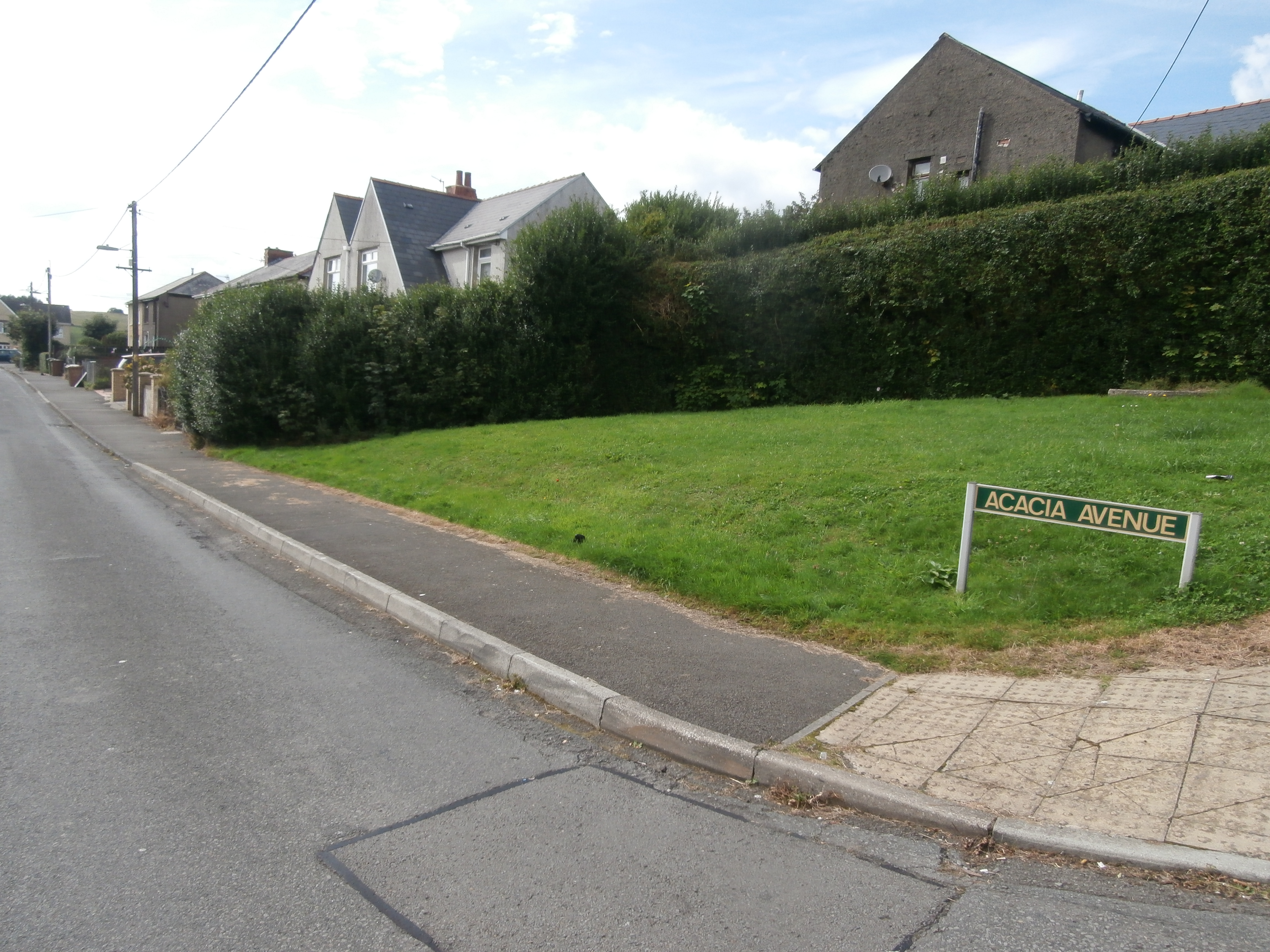
Acacia Avenue, Hengoed

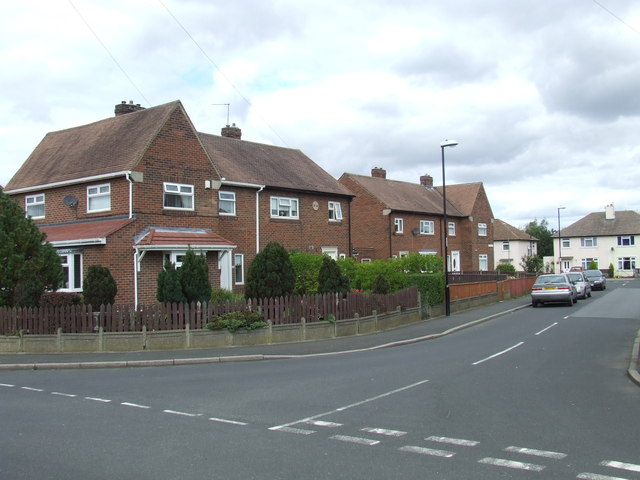
Acacia Avenue, Sunderland

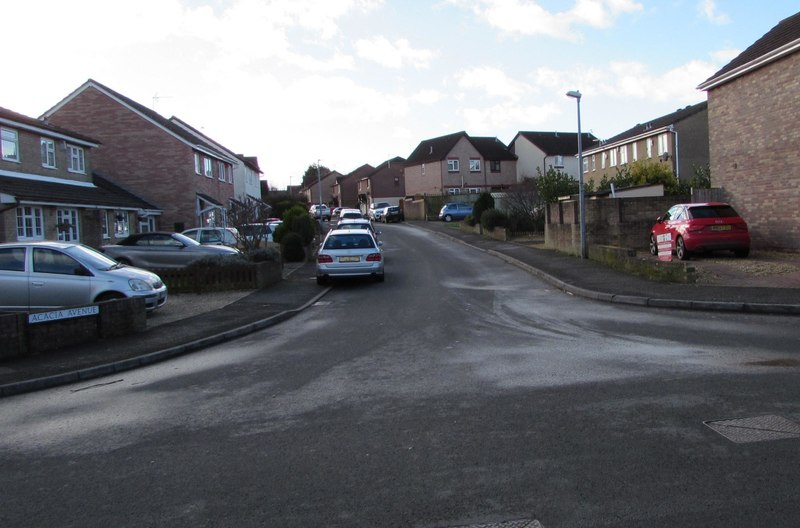
Acacia Avenue, Undy

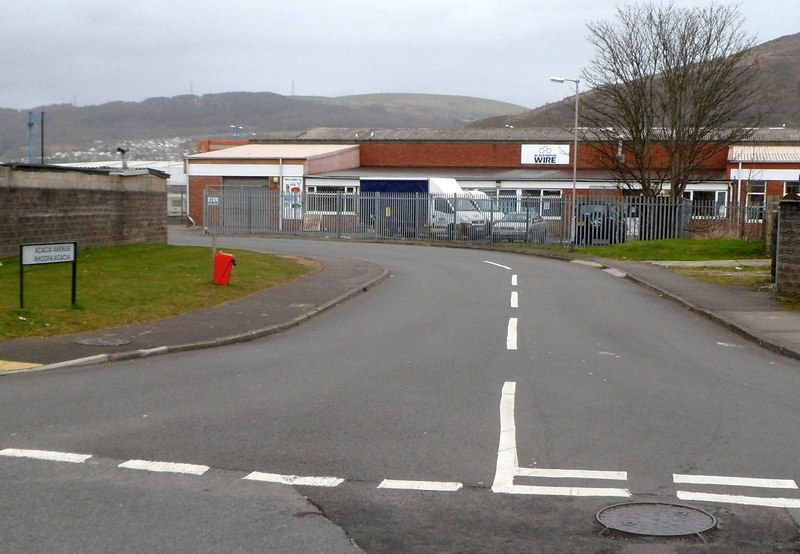
Acacia Avenue, Port Talbot

== In media ==
- 29 Acacia Avenue is a play by Denis and Mabel Constanduros.
- English heavy metal band Iron Maiden's song "22 Acacia Avenue" is about a fictional brothel in an innocuous London house.
- Comic character Bananaman lives at 29 Acacia Road.
- In "Her Majesty's Secret Service, after James Bond proposes to Tracy, (James): "Mr. and Mrs. James Bond." (Tracy): "of Acacia Avenue, Turnbridge Wells".
