= Forty Martyrs of Sebaste =

Roman soldiers and Christian martyrs

Saints Forty Martyrs of Sebaste
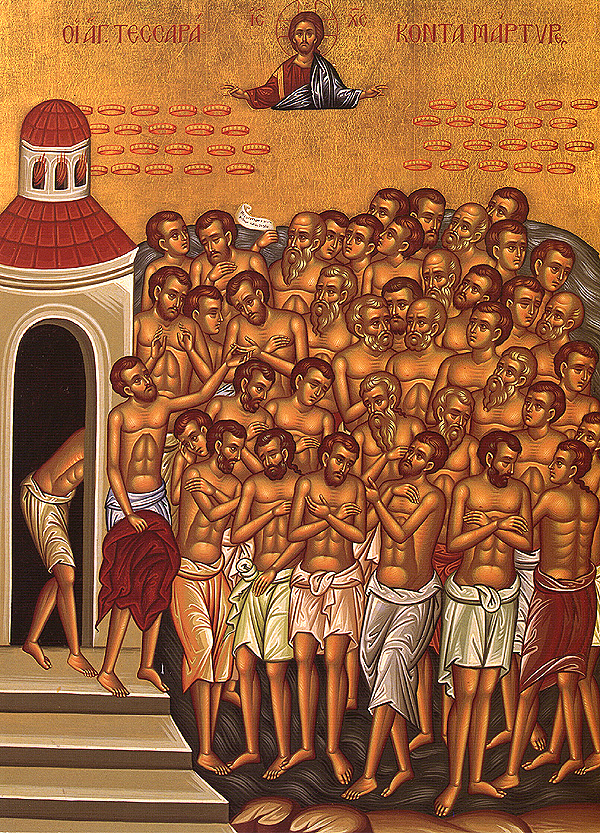
- Icon of The Forty Martyrs of Sebaste
- Died: c. 320 Anno Domini, Sebaste (modern-day Sivas, Turkey)
- Martyred by: Emperor Licinius
- Means of martyrdom: Exposure
- Venerated in: Catholic Church; Eastern Orthodoxy; Oriental Orthodoxy; Lutheran Church; Anglican Church
- Canonized: Pre-Congregation
- Feast: 9 March; 10 March (pre-1970 General Roman Calendar)
- Attributes: Crown of martyrdom Martyr's palm
- Patronage: Persecuted Christians

The Forty Martyrs of Sebaste or the Holy Forty (Katharevousa and Ancient Greek: Ἅγιοι Τεσσαράκοντα; Demotic: Άγιοι Σαράντα) were a group of Roman soldiers in the Legio XII Fulminata (Armed with Lightning) whose martyrdom in the year 320 AD for the Christian faith is recounted in traditional martyrologies.

They were killed near the city of Sebaste, in Lesser Armenia (present-day Sivas in Turkey), victims of the persecutions of Licinius who, after 316, persecuted the Christians of the East. The earliest account of their existence and martyrdom is given by Bishop Basil of Caesarea (370–379) in a homily he delivered on their feast day. The Feast of the Forty Martyrs is thus older than Basil himself, who eulogised them only fifty or sixty years after their deaths.

== Martyrdom ==
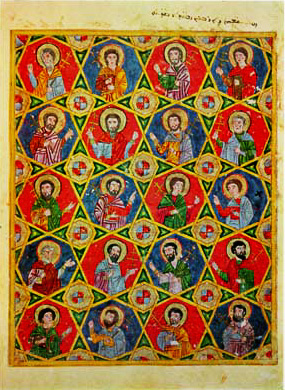
A miniature from the Syriac Gospel Lectionary, created c. 1220 near Mosul and exhibiting a strong Arab-Mongol influence.

According to Basil, forty soldiers who had openly confessed themselves as Christians were condemned by the prefect to be exposed naked upon a frozen pond near Sebaste on a bitterly cold night, that they might freeze to death. Among the confessors, one yielded and, leaving his companions, sought the warm baths near the lake which had been prepared for any who might prove inconstant. Upon immersion into the cauldron, the one who yielded went into shock and immediately died. One of the guards, Aglaius, was set to keep watch over the martyrs and beheld at this moment a supernatural brilliancy overshadowing them. He at once proclaimed himself a Christian, threw off his garments, and joined the remaining thirty-nine. Thus the number of forty remained complete. At daybreak, the stiffened bodies of the confessors, which still showed signs of life, were burned and the ashes cast into a river. Christians, however, collected the precious remains, and the relics were distributed throughout many cities. Veneration of the Forty Martyrs became widespread.

== Names ==
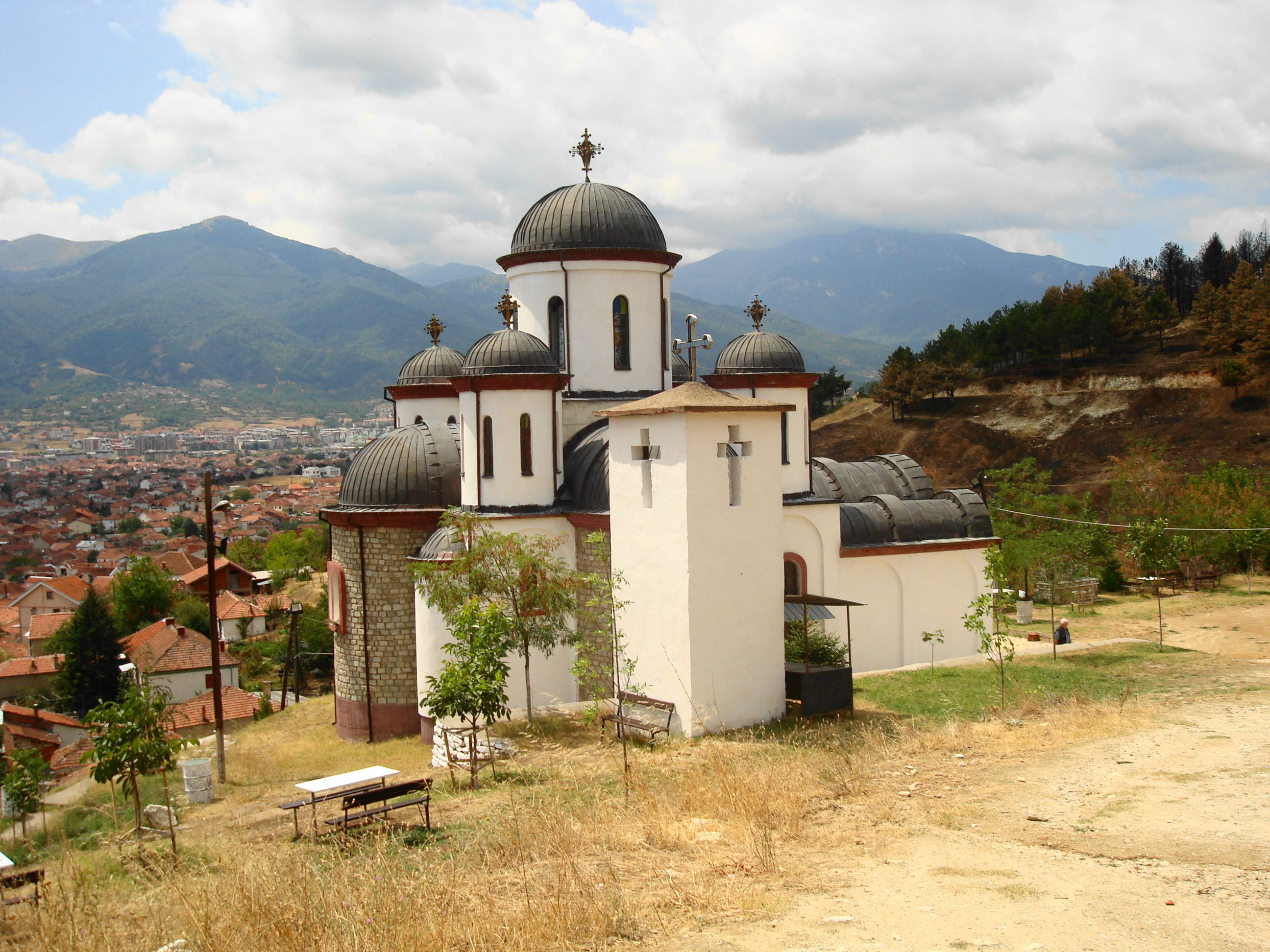
Orthodox church of Forty Martyrs of Sebaste in Bitola, North Macedonia.

The Menaion of the Eastern Orthodox Church lists the names of the Forty Martyrs as follows:

Acacius, Aetius, Aglaius, Alexander, Angius, Athanasius, Candidus, Chudion, Claudius, Cyril, Cyrion, Dometian, Domnus, Ecdicius, Elias, Eunoicus, Euthychius, Eutyches, Flavius, Gaius, Gorgonius, Helianus, Heraclius, Hesychius, John, Lysimachus, Meliton, Nicholas, Philoctemon, Priscus, Sacerdon, Severian, Sisinius, Smaragdus, Theodulus, Theophilus, Valens, Valerius, Vivianus, Xanthias

According to someone named "Antonio Borrelli", their names were:

Acacius, Aesychius, Aetius, Aggia, Alexander, Athanasius, Candidus, Cirillus, Claudius, Cudio, Cyrius, Domitian, Domninus, Ecdicius, Eunoicus, Eutychius, Eutychus (Aglaius), Flavius, Gaius, Gorgonius, Helianus, Heraclius, Ile, John, Leontius (Theoctistus), Lisimachus, Melito, Nicallus, Philotemon, Priscus, Sacerdos, Severianus, Sisinnius, Smaragdus, Theodulus, Theophilus, Valens, Valerius, Vicratius (Vibianus), Xantius

== Veneration ==
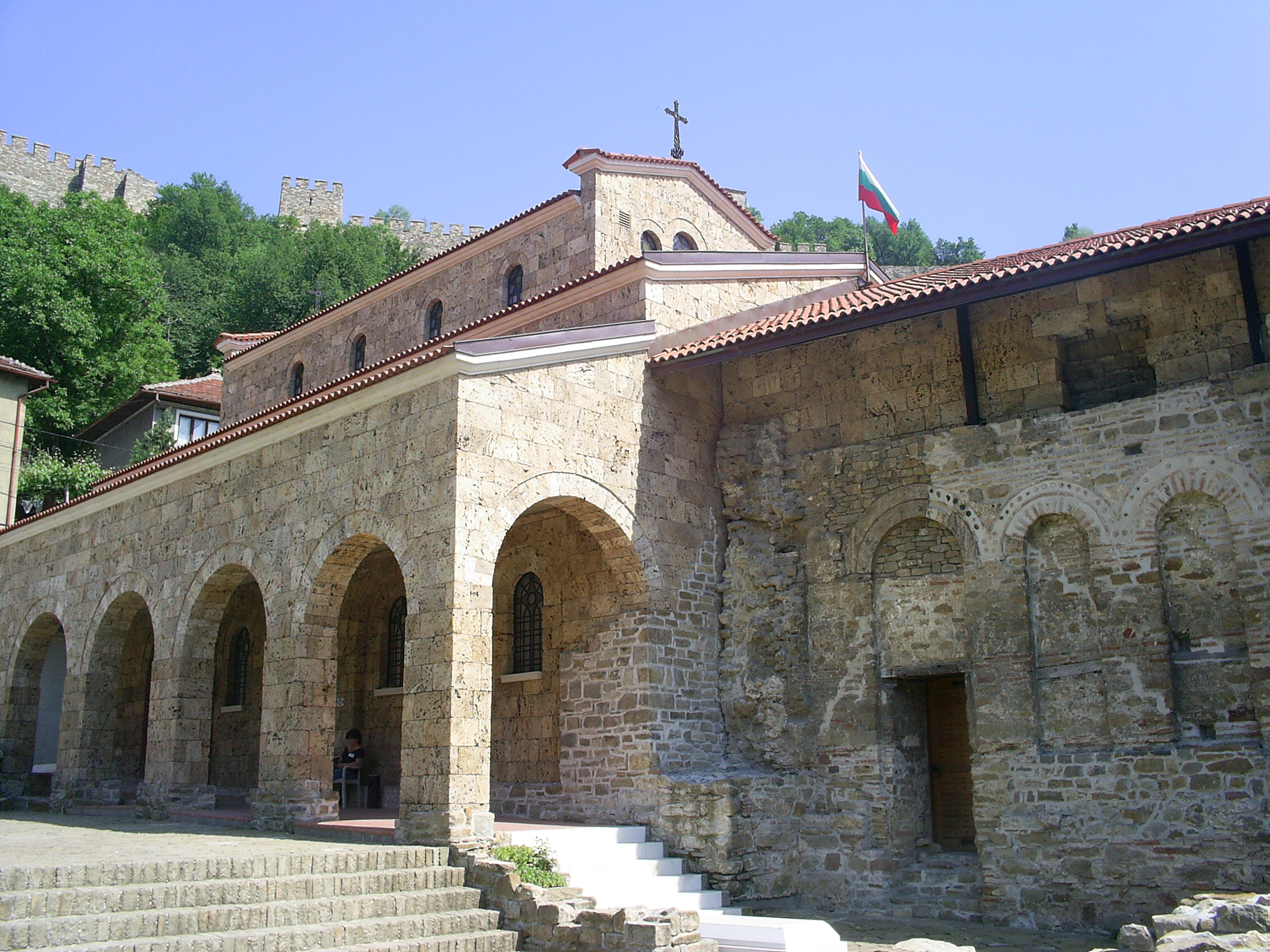
Holy Forty Martyrs Church, Veliko Tarnovo, 13th century

=== Early ===
A church was built at Caesarea, in Cappadocia, and it was in this church that Basil publicly delivered his homily. Gregory of Nyssa was especially devoted to the Forty Martyrs; two discourses in praise of them, preached by him in the church dedicated to them, are still preserved and upon the death of his parents, he laid them to rest beside the relics of the confessors. Ephrem the Syrian has also eulogized the Forty Martyrs. Sozomen, who was an eyewitness, has left an interesting account of the finding of the relics in Constantinople, in the shrine of Saint Thyrsus built by Caesarius, through the instrumentality of Empress Pulcheria.

=== In the East ===
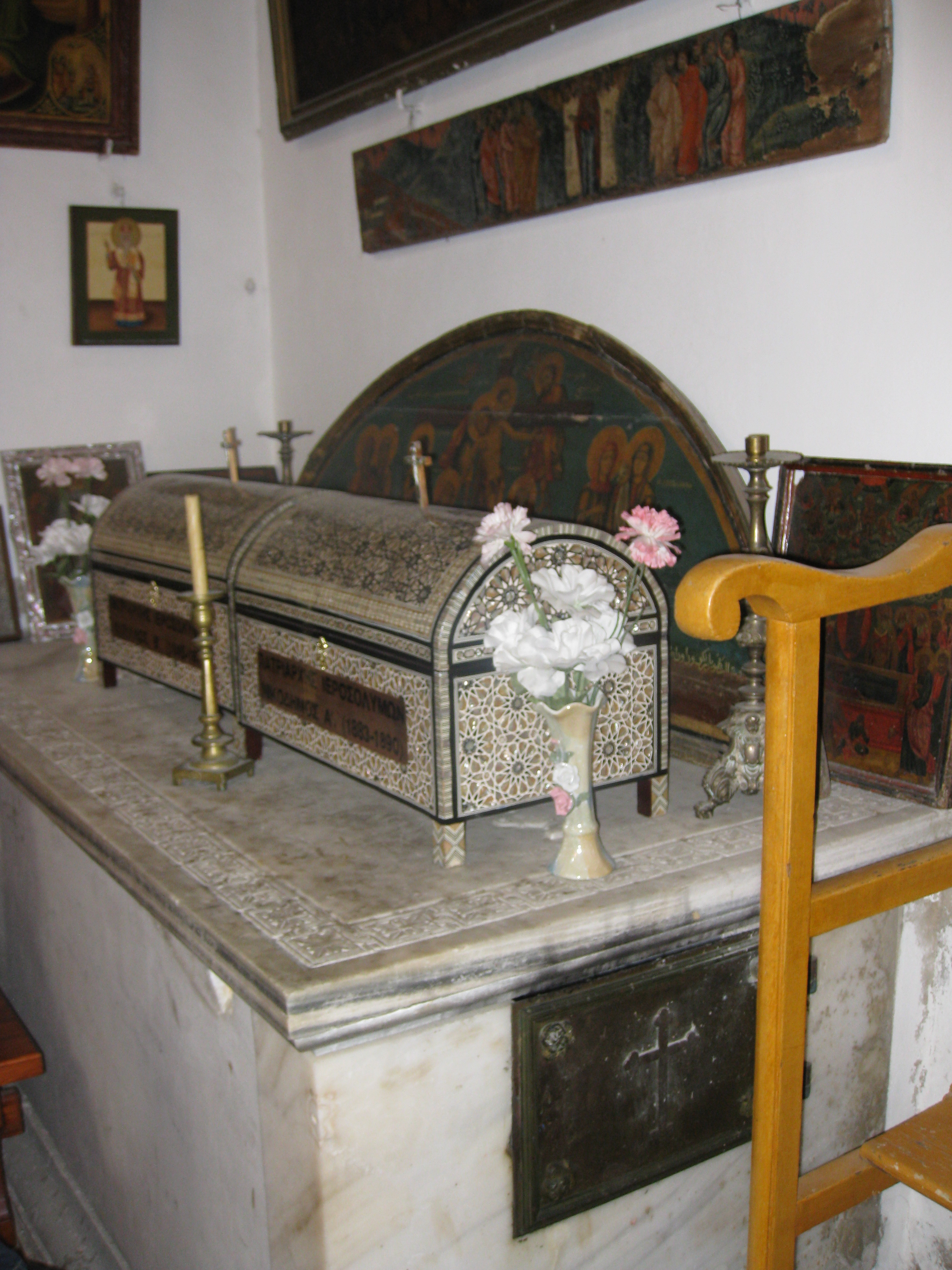
Chapel of the Forty Martyrs in the Church of the Holy Sepulchre, Jerusalem

The memory of the Forty Martyrs is widespread all over the East. The Forty Saints Monastery in Sarandë, modern day Albania, which gave its name in Greek to the city itself (Άγιοι Σαράντα, Hagioi Saranda), was built in the 6th century AD, and is thought to have been an important pilgrimage site. The Churches of St. Sophia in Ohrid (modern-day North Macedonia) and Kyiv (Ukraine) contain their depictions, datable to the 11th and 12th centuries, respectively. A number of auxiliary chapels were dedicated to the Forty, and there are several instances when an entire temple (church building) is dedicated to them: for example Xeropotamou Monastery on Mount Athos and the 13th-century Holy Forty Martyrs Church, in Veliko Tarnovo, Bulgaria. Anna Komnene speaks of a Church of the 40 saints located in Constantinople, in the Alexiad. In 2013 the Feast of the Holy Forty Martyrs in Štip was inscribed in UNESCO Intangible Cultural Heritage Lists of North Macedonia.

In Syria, the Armenian Cathedral of Aleppo and the Greek Orthodox Cathedral of Homs are dedicated to the Forty Martyrs.

The feast day of the Forty Martyrs falls on March 9. In Orthodox Churches that follow the Julian calendar, this day is intentionally placed so that it will fall during Great Lent. There is an intentional play on the number forty being both the number of martyrs and the days in the fast. Their feast also falls during Great Lent so that the endurance of the martyrs will serve as an example to the faithful to persevere to the end (i.e., throughout the forty days of the fast) in order to attain heavenly reward (participation in Pascha, the Resurrection of Jesus).

There is a pious custom of baking “skylarks” (pastries shaped like skylarks) on this day, because people believed that birds sing at this time to announce the arrival of spring.

A prayer mentioning the Forty Holy Martyrs of Sebaste is also placed in the Orthodox Wedding Service (referred to as a "crowning") to remind the bride and groom that spiritual crowns await them in Heaven also if they remain as faithful to Christ as these saints of long ago.

==== In Byzantine art ====
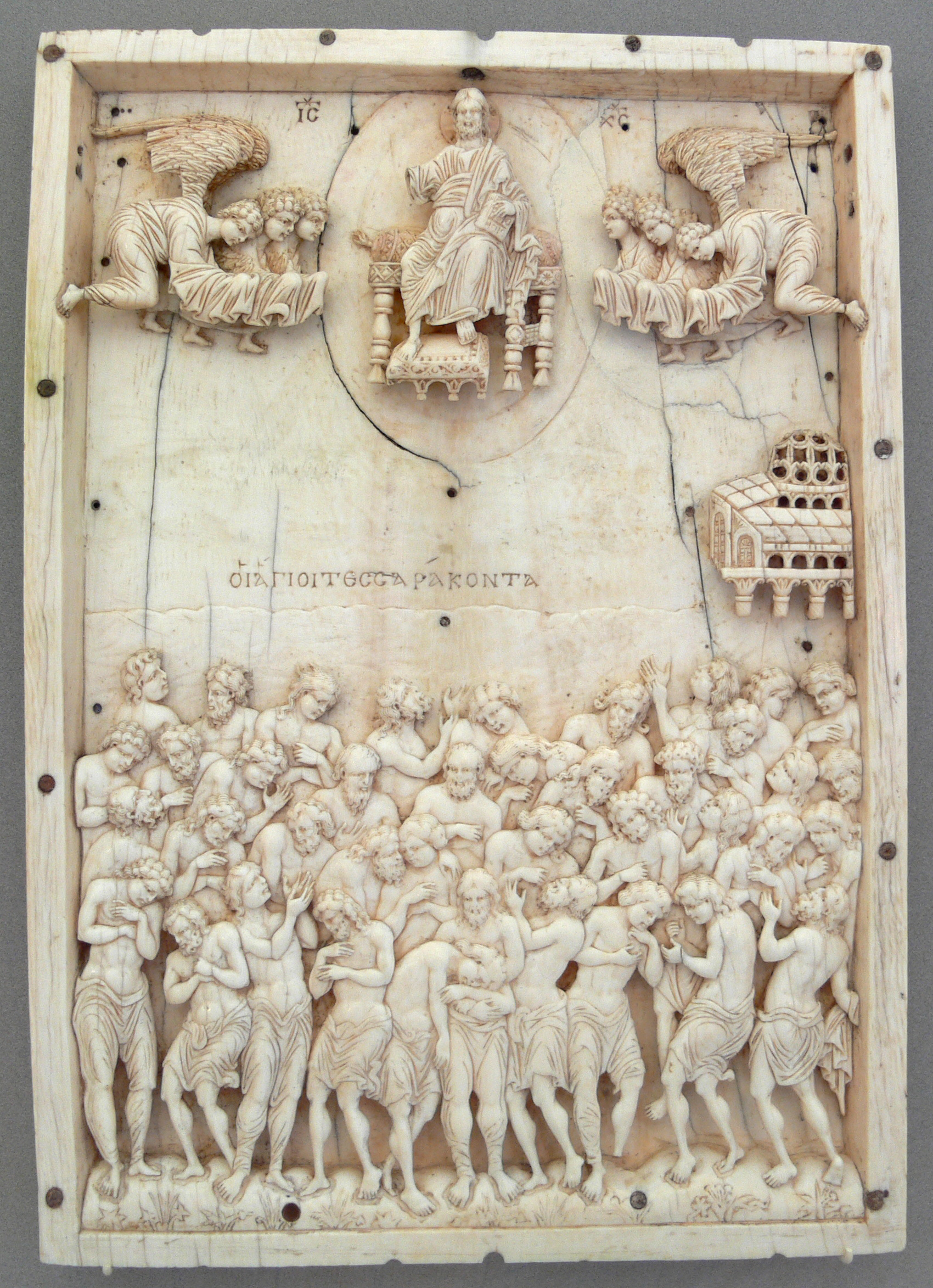
Ivory relief icon from Constantinople, 10th century (Bode Museum, Berlin)

Byzantine artists were fascinated with the subject that allowed them to graphically show human despair. The Martyrs were typically represented at the point when they were about to freeze to death, "shivering from the cold, hugging themselves for warmth, or clasping hands to their faces or wrists in pain and despair". This is particularly evident in the large 10th-century ivory plaque from the Bode Museum and the Palaiologan portable mosaic set in wax, from Dumbarton Oaks.

The subject remains popular among Eastern Orthodox iconographers.

==== In Syriac traditions ====
Within Syriac Christianity and especially the Syriac Orthodox Church, their memory is celebrated by Assyrians with a major feast called Rozune (Syriac: ܪܙܘܢܐ), where a coin is hidden inside a star-shaped bread that is eventually found by the lucky winner.

Jacob of Serugh and George, Bishop of the Arabs composed poems and biographies of their praise‌. One of the earliest churches named after them is a Syriac Orthodox church in Mardin; it remains in use to this day. The Monastery of St. Moses the Abyssinian, a Syriac Catholic church that used to be Syriac Orthodox in Syria, had an elaborate inscription of the Forty Martyrs above a bust of Christ.

=== In the West ===
Special devotion to the Forty Martyrs of Sebaste was introduced at an early date into the West. Bishop Gaudentius of Brescia (d. about 410 or 427) received particles of the ashes of martyrs during a voyage in the East, and placed them with other relics in the altar of the basilica which he had erected, at the consecration of which he delivered a discourse, still extant.

The Church of Santa Maria Antiqua in the Roman Forum, built in the fifth century, contains a chapel, built like the church itself on an ancient site, and consecrated to the Forty Martyrs. A sixth or seventh-century mural there depicts their martyrdom. The names of the confessors, as we find them also in later sources, were formerly inscribed on this fresco.

Oratory of the Forty Martyrs in Santa Maria Antiqua

Oratory of the Forty Martyrs fresco

Acts of these martyrs, written subsequently, in Greek, Syriac and Latin, are yet extant, also a "Testament" of the Forty Martyrs.

In the West, the feast of the Forty Martyrs of Sebaste was celebrated on 10 March and suppressed in 1969. In some countries, for example Poland and Slovenia, 10 March is named Martyrs' Day as a relict of the feast and celebrated as Men's Day by some people. The International Men's Day takes place on 19 November.

== See also ==
- 20,000 Martyrs of Nicomedia
- 42 Martyrs of Amorium
- Forty Martyrs of England and Wales
- Theban Legion
