= Acacius of Beroea =

5th-century Bishop of Beroea

Acacius or Aqaq was a Syrian, lived in a monastery near Antioch, and, for his active defense of the Church against Arianism, was made Bishop of Beroea in 378 AD, by Eusebius of Samosata.

While a priest, Acacius (with Paul, another priest) wrote to Epiphanius of Salamis a letter, in consequence of which the latter composed his Panarion (374–376). This letter is prefixed to the work. In 377–378, he was sent to Rome to confute Apollinaris of Laodicea before Pope Damasus I. He was present at the Ecumenical Council of Constantinople in 381, and on the death of Meletius of Antioch took part in Flavian's ordination to the See of Antioch, by whom he was afterwards sent to the Pope in order to heal the schism between the churches of the West and Antioch.

Afterwards, Acacius took part in the persecution against Chrysostom, and again compromised himself by ordaining as successor to Flavian, Porphyrius, a man considered unworthy of the episcopate and also a meletian. He defended Nestorius against Saint Cyril when the former was charged with heresy, though was not himself present at the Council of Ephesus. At a great age, he labored to reconcile Cyril of Alexandria and the Eastern Bishops at a Synod held at Beroea in 432 AD.

Acacius died 437, at the purported age of 116 years. Three of his letters remain in the original Greek, one to Cyril, and two to Alexander, Bishop of Hierapolis. (Ibid, pp. 819, 830, c.41.55. §129, 143.)
