= Diocese of Bela =

Roman Catholic diocese in Greece

The Diocese of Bela is a Roman Catholic titular diocese in Greece.

== History ==
Bela was a medieval fortress town and bishopric in Epirus, northwestern Greece.

Bela first appears in the mid-10th century, when the Byzantine Empire's Notitiae Episcopatuum mention the see of "Photice, that is Bela" (Φωτικῆς ἤτοι Βελᾶς), implying that the seat of the bishopric of Photice, a suffragan of the Metropolis of Naupaktos, had been moved to Bela. This move was temporary, since from the mid-11th century, Photice is again mentioned without further additions. Its only recorded bishop during that time, Constantine, is known from a 10th-century episcopal seal.

From the early 13th century, however, Bela is attested as a separate bishopric, held by Manuel Makres. It is possible that during the 13th century, Bela formed also a province (theme), but this is unclear. It appears that by 1367, Bela and nearby Dryinopolis were no longer suffragans of Naupaktos, but of the Metropolis of Ioannina, as indeed is confirmed from the late 15th century on.

== Restoration ==
The see, Eastern Orthodox throughout its existence, was nominally restored in 1933 as a Latin Catholic titular bishopric. It has had the following incumbents:

- José Alves Martins (1935.11.15 – death 1950.04.14) as emeritate
- Bernardo Arango Henao, Jesuits (S.J.) (1950.04.18 – 1962.10.27), while Apostolic Vicar of Barrancabermeja (Colombia)
- Gerard William Tickle (1963.10.12 – death 1994.09.14), while Military Vicar of Great Britain (UK) (1963.10.12 – 1978.04.24) and on emeritate
- Gerald Frederick Kicanas (1995.03.20 – 2001.10.30), while Auxiliary Bishop of Chicago (Illinois, USA)
- Santiago Silva Retamales (2002.02.16 – 2015.07.07), while Auxiliary Bishop of Valparaíso (Chile)
- Ricardo Orlando Seirutti (2015.11.07 – today), Auxiliary Bishop of Córdoba (Argentina)

== Sources ==
- Soustal, Peter; Koder, Johannes (1981). Tabula Imperii Byzantini, Band 3: Nikopolis und Kephallēnia (in German). Vienna: Verlag der Österreichischen Akademie der Wissenschaften. ISBN 978-3-7001-0399-8.
- GCatholic data for all sections
- Raymond Janin, lemma 'Belle' in Dictionnaire d'Histoire et de Géographie ecclésiastiques, vol. VII, 1934, col. 794
