= September 29 (Eastern Orthodox liturgics) =

Day in the Eastern Orthodox liturgical calendar

Eastern Orthodox liturgical calendar
September 28	September 29	September 30
September 29 O.S. ≍ October 12 N.S. September 29 N.S ≍ September 16 O.S.

An Eastern Orthodox cross

September 29 in Eastern Orthodox liturgical calendars is a feast day and a day of commemoration of saints and martyrs. Although some Orthodox churches use the Revised Julian Calendar and others use the traditional Julian calendar, the fixed commemorations for their respective September 29 are broadly the same, no matter which calendar is used. (Note: Despite the dates being the same, the days to which they refer typically differ by 13 days. The notation Old Style or O.S. is sometimes used to indicate a date in the traditional Julian Calendar (the "Old Calendar"). The notation New Style or N.S. indicates a date in the Revised Julian calendar (the "New Calendar").)

== Saints ==
- The Eighty (80) Holy Martyrs of Byzantium, burnt in a marine vessel during the reign of Emperor Valens (364-378)
- Martyrs Tryphon, Trophimus, and Dorymedon, and 150 Martyrs, in Palestine.
- Martyr Theodota of Philippi.
- Martyr Petronia, by the sword. (Note: Some Synaxaria also insert the memory of Venerable Anastasia the Ascetic here.)
- Martyr Gudelia (Govdelia) of Persia (4th century) (Note: "In Persia, under king Sapor, the holy martyr Gudelia. After having converted many to the faith, and refused to adore the sun and fire, she was subjected to numerous torments. Then having the skin torn off her head, and being fastened to a post, she deserved an eternal triumph.")
- Martyrs Dada, Gabdelas, and Casdoe (Kazdoa) of Persia (4th century) (Note: "In the same country, the holy martyrs Dadas, a blood relation of king Sapor, Casdoa, his wife, and Gabdelas, his son. After being deprived of their dignities, and subjected to various torments, they were for a long time imprisoned and finally put to the sword.")
- Saint Cyriacus the Anchorite, Hermit, of Palestine (556) (Note: "In Palestine, St. Quiriacus, anchoret.") (Note: Name days celebrated today include: Kyriakos, Kiriakos (Κυριακὸς; Κυριάκος))
- Saint Theophanes the Merciful of Gaza.

== Pre-Schism Western saints ==
- Saint Fraternus, Bishop of Auxerre in France and by tradition a martyr (450)
- Saint Ludwin (Leudwinus, Liutwin, Leodwin), Founder of Mettlach in Germany and then Bishop of Trier (c. 713) (Note: Born in Austrasia in the east of France, he married. Left a widower, he founded the monastery of Mettlach and became a monk. Later he became Bishop of Trier in Germany.)
- Saints Catholdus, Anno and Diethardus, three monks who preached the Gospel around Eichstätt in Germany (late 8th century)
- Saint Alaricus (Adalricus, Adalrai), a monk at Einsiedeln Abbey in Switzerland, later a hermit on the island of Uffnau in the lake of Zurich (975)

== Post-Schism Orthodox saints ==
- Saint Cyprian, Abbot, of Ustiug in Vologda (1276)
- New Hieromartyr Malachi of Rhodes, tortured and roasted on a spit over live coals (1500)
- Venerable monk-martyrs in the Strofades (1530 or 1537) (Note: None of the Synaxaria record their memory. We learn about them only from their Service, which was composed by the Greek Orthodox Scholar Pachomios Rousanos (1508-1553), published under the title: "Sufferings and Service of the Monks martyred by the Turks in Strofadia".)
- Saint Onuphrius the Wonderworker, of Gareji, Georgia (1733)
- Three New Martyrs of Vrachori, Agrinio (1786) (Note: None of the Synaxaria record their memory..)

=== New martyrs and confessors ===
- New Hieromartyr John (Pommer), Archbishop of Riga in Latvia (1934) (Note: "St John’s influence in Galicia was especially felt through his involvement in the movement toward Orthodoxy among the Galician intelligentsia. He has been formally placed in the list of All Saints of Galicia as a result.": See: (in Russian) Собор Галицких святых. Википедии. (Russian Wikipedia).)

== Other commemorations ==
- Translation of the relics of St. Donatus, Bishop of Euroea in Epirus (387), from the Church of Santa Maria e San Donato in Venice to Paramythia in Greece. (Note: His feast day is on April 30 both in the Synaxarion of Constantinople and in the Venetian calendars. However the Latin translation of his Life lists his feast day on August 7, which is the feast of "St. Donatus, second Bishop of Arezzo in Italy". In 1961 the Greek government established April 30 as a public holiday for the entire region of the "Metropolis of Paramythia, Filiates, Giromeri". Tradition regards St. Donatus as a distinguished prelate and wonderworker.)
- Repose of Blessed Anthony Alexeyevich, Fool-for-Christ, of Zadonsk (1851)
- Uncovering of the relics (1993) of St. John (Maximovitch), Archbishop of Shanghai and San Francisco (1966).
- Repose of Archimandrite Gerasim (Schmaltz) of Alaska (1969)

== Icon gallery ==
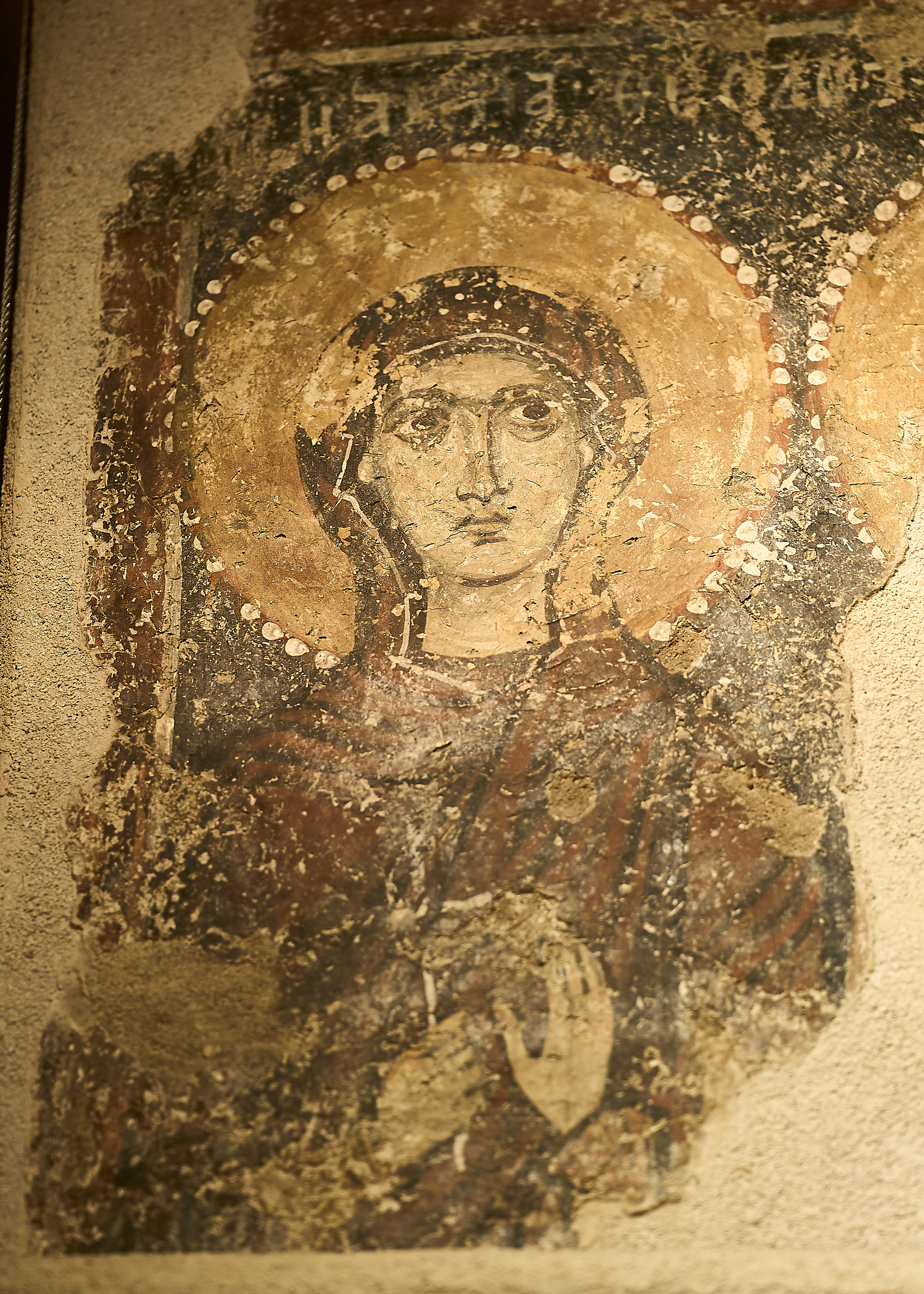
Martyr Theodota of Philippi.

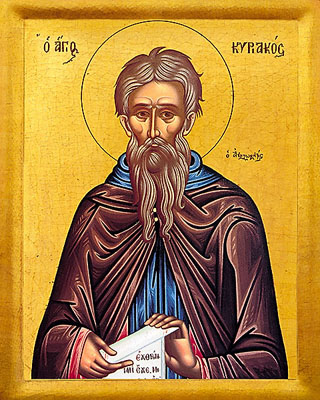
St. Cyriacus the Anchorite (Kyriakos).

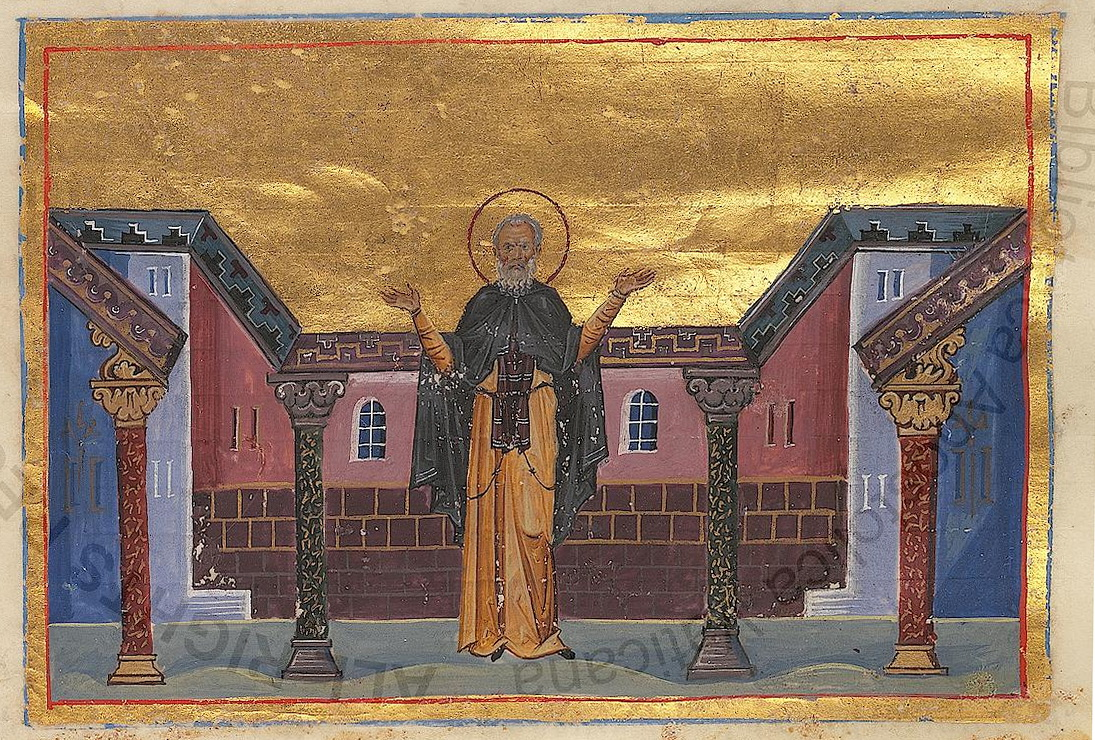
St. Cyriacus the Anchorite (Kyriakos).
(Menologion of Basil II, 10th century).

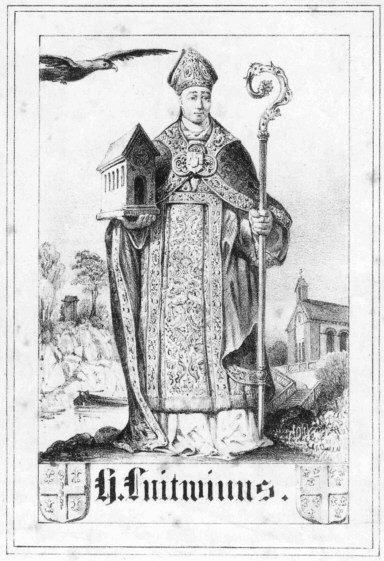
St Ludwin, Bishop of Trier.

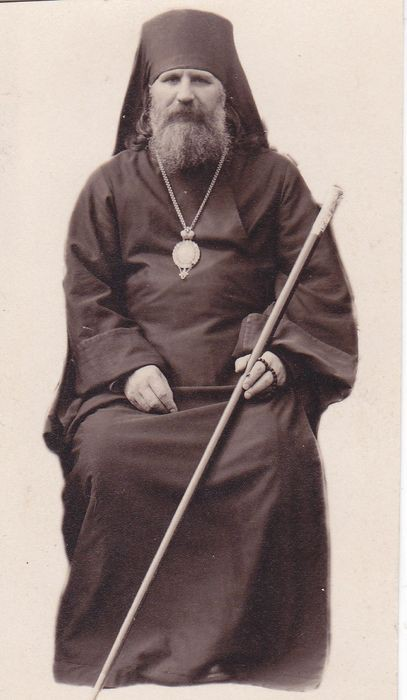
New Hieromartyr John (Pommer), Archbishop of Riga.

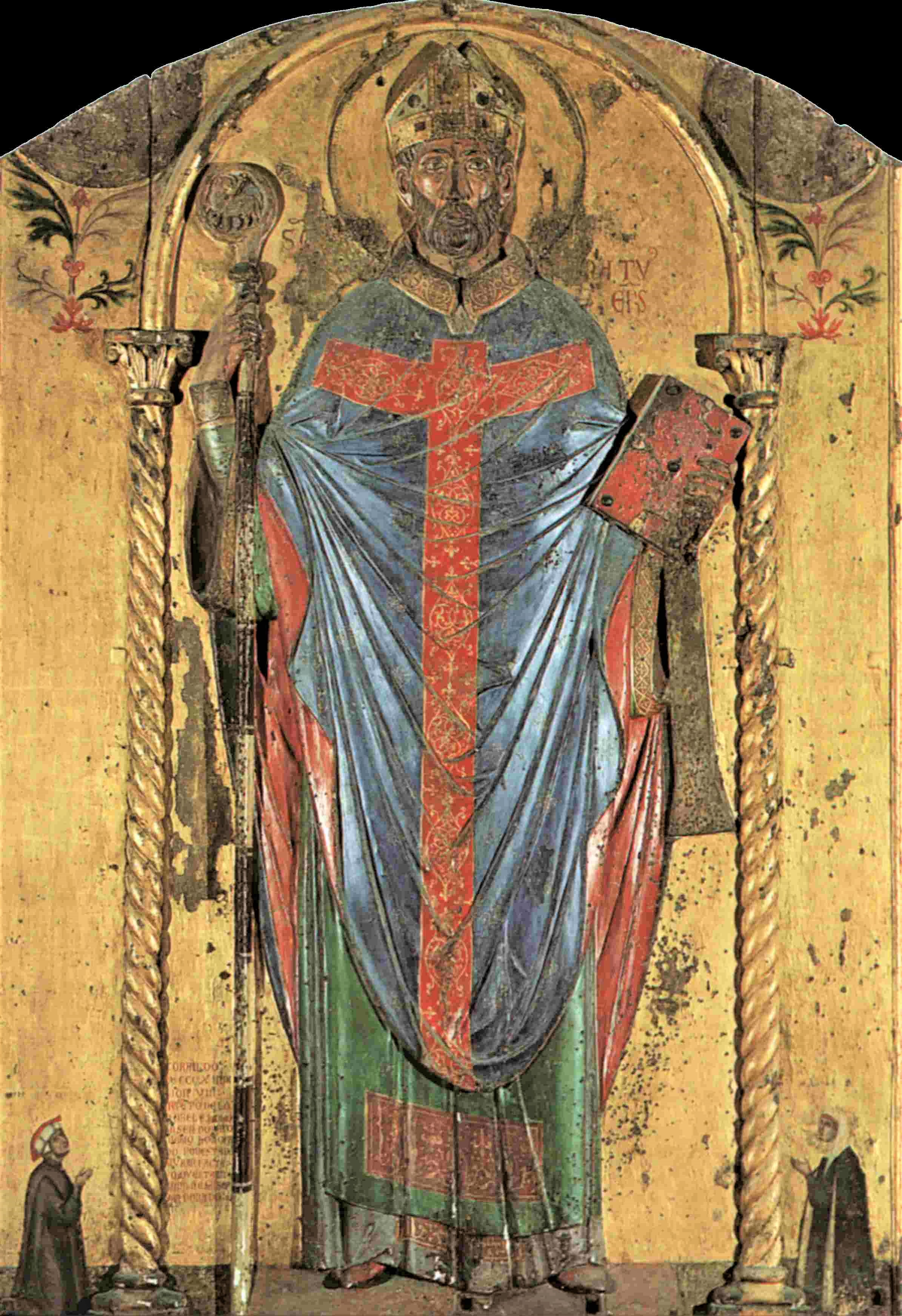
St. Donatus, Bishop of Euroea in Epirus.

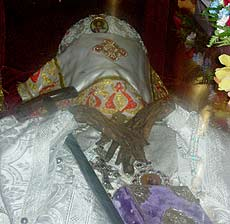
Relics (1993) of St. John (Maximovitch), Archbishop of Shanghai and San Francisco.

== Sources ==
- September 29/October 12. Orthodox Calendar (PRAVOSLAVIE.RU).
- October 12 / September 29. HOLY TRINITY RUSSIAN ORTHODOX CHURCH (A parish of the Patriarchate of Moscow).
- September 29. OCA - The Lives of the Saints.
- The Autonomous Orthodox Metropolia of Western Europe and the Americas (ROCOR). St. Hilarion Calendar of Saints for the year of our Lord 2004. St. Hilarion Press (Austin, TX). pp. 72–73.
- The Twenty-Ninth Day of the Month of September. Orthodoxy in China.
- September 29. Latin Saints of the Orthodox Patriarchate of Rome.
- The Roman Martyrology. Transl. by the Archbishop of Baltimore. Last Edition, According to the Copy Printed at Rome in 1914. Revised Edition, with the Imprimatur of His Eminence Cardinal Gibbons. Baltimore: John Murphy Company, 1916. pp. 300–301.
- Rev. Richard Stanton. A Menology of England and Wales, or, Brief Memorials of the Ancient British and English Saints Arranged According to the Calendar, Together with the Martyrs of the 16th and 17th Centuries. London: Burns & Oates, 1892. pp. 462–466.

Greek Sources

- Great Synaxaristes: (in Greek) 29 ΣΕΠΤΕΜΒΡΙΟΥ. ΜΕΓΑΣ ΣΥΝΑΞΑΡΙΣΤΗΣ.
- (in Greek) Συναξαριστής. 29 Σεπτεμβρίου. ECCLESIA.GR. (H ΕΚΚΛΗΣΙΑ ΤΗΣ ΕΛΛΑΔΟΣ).
- (in Greek) 29/09/2016. Ορθόδοξος Συναξαριστής.

Russian Sources

- (in Russian) 12 октября (29 сентября). Православная Энциклопедия под редакцией Патриарха Московского и всея Руси Кирилла (электронная версия). (Orthodox Encyclopedia - Pravenc.ru).
- (in Russian) 29 сентября по старому стилю / 12 октября по новому стилю. Русская Православная Церковь - Православный церковный календарь на 2016 год.
