= Bela (Epirus) =

Medieval fortress town and bishopric in Epirus, northwestern Greece

Coordinates: 39°51′54″N 20°37′01″E

Bela or Vela (Greek: Βελά) was a medieval fortress town and bishopric in Epirus, northwestern Greece.

== History ==
Bela is located near the site of the modern Vella Monastery, some 2 km south of Kalpaki. The name is of Slavic origin. The fortress survived until the mid-20th century, when it was documented by N. G. L. Hammond; however, the Second World War and its aftermath, as well as the operation of a quarry on the eastern side of the hill, have destroyed most of the remains described by Hammond.

Bela first appears in the mid-10th century, when the Byzantine Empire's Notitiae Episcopatuum mention the see of "Photice, that is Bela" (Φωτικῆς ἤτοι Βελᾶς), implying that the seat of the bishopric of Photice, a suffragan of the Metropolis of Naupaktos, had been moved to Bela. This move was temporary, since from the mid-11th century, Photice is again mentioned without further additions. Its only recorded bishop during that time, Constantine, is known from a 10th-century episcopal seal.

From the early 13th century, however, Bela is attested as a separate bishopric, held by Manuel Makres. It is possible that during the 13th century, Bela formed also a province (theme), but this is unclear. It appears that by 1367, Bela and nearby Dryinopolis were no longer suffragans of Naupaktos, but of the Metropolis of Ioannina, as indeed is confirmed from the late 15th century on.

In 1380, Bela was captured by the Ottoman Turks under Lala Şahin Pasha, but in 1382 it came under the control of John Spata's son-in-law Marchesano.

== Catholic titular see ==
Bela is the location of the Roman Catholic titular Diocese of Bela. The see, Eastern Orthodox throughout its existence, was nominally restored in 1933 as a Latin Catholic titular bishopric.

== Sources ==
- Soustal, Peter; Koder, Johannes (1981). Tabula Imperii Byzantini, Band 3: Nikopolis und Kephallēnia (in German). Vienna: Verlag der Österreichischen Akademie der Wissenschaften. ISBN 978-3-7001-0399-8.
