= Metropolis of Ioannina =

Greek Orthodox diocese

Metropolis of Ioannina Μητρόπολις Ιωαννίνων

Location
- Country: Greece (historically Ottoman Empire, Byzantine Empire)
- Ecclesiastical province: Ioannina

Information
- Rite: Byzantine Rite
- Established: 9th century (as bishopric), 1318 (as metropolis)
- Cathedral: Church of St. Athanasios, Ioannina

Current leadership
- Parent church: Patriarchate of Constantinople/Church of Greece
- Metropolitan: Maximos Papagiannis

Website
- http://www.imioanninon.gr/main/

The Metropolis of Ioannina (Greek: Ιερά Μητρόπολις Ιωαννίνων, romanized: Iera Mitropolis Ioanninon) is a Greek Orthodox diocese centred on the city of Ioannina, in the Epirus of Greece. As one of the "New Lands", it belongs formally to the Patriarchate of Constantinople, but is administered by the Church of Greece. As of June 2014, the Metropolitan of Ioannina is Maximos Papagiannis.

== History ==
The exact time of Ioannina's foundation is unknown. It is commonly identified with an unnamed new, "well-fortified" city, recorded by the historian Procopius (De Aedificiis, IV.1.39–42) as having been built by the Byzantine emperor Justinian I (r. 527–565) for the inhabitants of ancient Euroia, but archaeological evidence for this is lacking; indeed, early 21st-century excavations have brought to light fortifications dating to the Hellenistic period (4th–3rd centuries BC), the course of which was largely followed by the later Castle of Ioannina.

The name Ioannina appears for the first time in 879, in the acts of the Fourth Council of Constantinople, which refer to one Zacharias, Bishop of Ioannine, a suffragan of Naupaktos. After the Byzantine conquest of Bulgaria, in 1020 Emperor Basil II (r. 976–1025) subordinated the local bishopric to the Archbishopric of Ohrid. In the treaty of partition of the Byzantine lands after the Fourth Crusade, Ioannina was promised to the Venetians, but in the event, it became part of the new principality of Epirus, founded by Michael I Komnenos Doukas.

Following the assassination of the last native ruler, Thomas I Komnenos Doukas by his nephew, Nicholas Orsini, in 1318, the city refused to accept the latter and turned to the Byzantines for assistance. On this occasion, Emperor Andronikos II Palaiologos (r. 1282–1328) elevated the city to a metropolitan bishopric, and in 1319 Andronikos II issued a chrysobull conceding wide-ranging autonomy and various privileges and exemptions on its inhabitants. The new metropolis was placed in 53rd place among the metropolitan sees subject to the Patriarchate of Constantinople, but rose to 42nd place under Andronikos III Palaiologos (r. 1328–1341), and further to 33rd place in c. 1470. The suffragan sees of the new metropolis in the 14th century are not known, but are likely the same four sees as those attested for c. 1470: the bishoprics of Vela, Dryinoupolis, Bouthrotos/Glyky, and Himarra.

Under the regime of Thomas II Preljubović (1367–1384), the citizens and the local Church suffered greatly: Thomas confiscated property in favour of his Serb followers, and drove the Metropolitan Sebastianos to exile; nevertheless, he was able to repel successive attempts by the Albanian chieftains Peter Losha and John Bua Spata to capture the city, most notably the great surprise attack of 1379, whose failure the Ioannites attributed to intervention by their patron, Saint Michael. After Thomas' murder in December 1384, the citizens of Ioannina offered their city to Esau de' Buondelmonti. Esau took care to recall those exiled under Thomas, including the Metropolitan Gabriel, and restore the properties confiscated by him. Esau secured a period of peace for the city, which lasted until his death in 1411. The Ioannites then invited the Count palatine of Cephalonia and Zakynthos, Carlo I Tocco, as their new ruler. Following the death of Carlo I in 1429, in October 1430 Ioannina surrendered to an Ottoman army.

Led by the Metropolitan, the notables of the city secured a charter, the "Order of Sinan Pasha" (ὁρισμὸς τοῦ Σινᾶν πασᾶ), which outlined the privileges of the city: the church bells would continue to be tolled, no mosques were to be erected, and the authority of the Metropolitan and the possessions of the Church were to be respected. This privileged position lasted until 1611, when the city was engulfed by the peasant revolt led by Dionysius the Philosopher, the Metropolitan of Larissa. In its aftermath, Christians were evicted from the Ioannina Castle, and Muslim and Jewish families settled in their stead. The residence of the Metropolitan was moved from the Castle to the Church of St. Athanasios, where it remains to this day (the church was rebuilt in 1832 after it was gutted in a fire in 1820). The original cathedral of the city, which lay in the southeastern part of the Castle, survived at least until 1430, but is recorded as being ruined by 1596/97. Columns from it were reused in the Fethiye Mosque, built by Ali Pasha in 1795.

A separate bishopric for the region Zagori was established from the Metropolitan's jurisdiction in the late 16th century, but it was disestablished soon after. Its seat was probably the Rongovou Monastery. In 1659, Sultan Ahmed III established the Exarchate of Metsovo as a special privilege for the villages of the region of Metsovo. The exarchate was under the direct jurisdiction of the Patriarch of Constantinople, and lasted until 1795. Following the Asia Minor Disaster and the Greco-Turkish population exchange, in 1924 a separate Metropolis of Metsovo was established for the provisional settlement of bishops evicted from Asia Minor. Its first and only metropolitan was the former Metropolitan of Ganos and Chora, Timotheos (1924–1928).

== Bishops ==
Apart from Bishop Zacharias in 879, no incumbent of the see is known by name prior to its raising to metropolitan status. From the 14th century, the episcopal list is as follows:

Name	Name in Greek	Tenure	Notes
Sebastian	Σεβαστιανός	1365–1381	
Matthew	Ματθαῖος	1382–1385	
Gabriel	Γαβριήλ	1386–1408	
Joseph	Ἰωσήφ	1408	
Proclus	Πρόκλος		
Neophytos	Νεόφυτος	1480–1487	
Nephon	Νήφων	1500	
Nilus	Νεῖλος	1513	
Theoleptus	Θεόληπτος	1513	Subsequently Ecumenical Patriarch of Constantinople, 1513–1522
Gregory	Γρηγόριος	1513	
Sophronius	Σωφρόνιος	1520	
Nephon	Νήφων	1526–1545	
Macarius	Μακάριος	1545–1549	
Joasaph	Ἰωάσαφ	1549–1571	1st tenure
Daniel	Δανιήλ	1571–1580	
Joasaph	Ἰωάσαφ Β΄	1580–1585	2nd tenure
Matthew	Ματθαῖος	1585–1595	Subsequently Ecumenical Patriarch of Constantinople, 1596, 1598–1602, 1603
Neophytus	Νεόφυτος	1597	1st tenure
Manasses	Μανασσής	1605–1613	
Matthew	Ματθαῖος	1614	
Neophytus	Νεόφυτος το Β΄	1616–1620	2nd tenure
Theocletus	Θεόκλητος	1621–1632	
Joannicius, formerly of Xanthi	Ἰωαννίκιος ὁ ἀπό Ξάνθης	1632	
Parthenius	Παρθένιος	1632–1639	Subsequently Ecumenical Patriarch of Constantinople, 1639–1644
Callinicus	Καλλίνικος	1639–1640	1st tenure
Joasaph	Ἰωάσαφ	1640–1644	
Callinicus	Καλλίνικος	1644–1666	2nd tenure
Cyril	Κύριλλος	1666–1689	1st tenure
Callinicus	Καλλίνικος	1669–1670	3rd tenure
Cyril	Κύριλλος	1670–1676	2nd tenure
Jacob	Ἰάκωβος	1676–1680	
Clement of Chios	Κλήμης ὁ Χίος	1680–1715	
Hierotheus Raptis	Ἱερόθεος Ράπτης	1716–1735	
Gregory of Byzantium	Γρηγόριος ὁ Βυζάντιος	1736–1767	1st tenure
Gabriel of Smyrna	Γαβριήλ ἐκ Σμύρνης	1767–1771	Subsequently Ecumenical Patriarch of Constantinople, 1780–1785
Gregory of Byzantium	Γρηγόριος ὁ Βυζάντιος	1771–1776	2nd tenure
Hierotheus	Ἱερόθεος	1776	
Paisius	Παΐσιος	1776–1780	
Macarius	Μακάριος	1780–1799	
Hierotheus Tremoulas	Ἱερόθεος Τρεμούλας	1799–1810	
Gabriel Gagas	Γαβριήλ ὁ Γκάγκας	1810–1826	
Benedict of Byzantium	Βενέδικτος ὁ Βυζάντιος	1826–1830	
Joachim, formerly of Sofia	Ἰωακείμ ὁ ἀπό Σόφιας	1830–1835	
Joachim of Chios	Ἰωακείμ ὁ Χίος	1835–1838	1st tenure.
Joannicius of Crete	Ἰωαννίκιος ὁ Κρῆς	1838–1840	
Joachim of Chios	Ἰωακείμ ὁ Χίος	1840–1845	2nd tenure. Subsequently Ecumenical Patriarch of Constantinople, 1860–1863, 1873–1878
Joannicius	Ἰωαννίκιος	1845–1854	
Parthenius	Παρθένιος	1854–1869	
Sophronius Christidis	Σωφρόνιος Χρηστίδης	1869–1899	1st tenure
Gregory Kallidis	Γρηγόριος Καλλίδης	1889–1902	
Sophronius Christidis	Σωφρόνιος Χρηστίδης	1902–1906	2nd tenure
Gerasimos Tantalidis	Γεράσιμος Τανταλίδης	1906–1910	
Gervasios Orologas	Γερβάσιος Ὡρολογᾶς	1910–1916	
Spyridon Vlachos	Σπυρίδων Βλάχος	1916–1922	1st tenure
Germanos Karavangelis, formerly of Amaseia	Γερμανός Καραβαγγέλης, ὁ ἀπὸ Ἀμασείας	1923–1924	
Spyridon Vlachos	Σπυρίδων Βλάχος	1924–1949	Subsequently Archbishop of Athens and All Greece, 1949–1956
Demetrios Efthymiou	Δημήτριος Ἐυθυμίου	1956–1958	
Seraphim Tikas, formerly of Arta	Σεραφείμ Τίκας, ὁ ἀπὸ Ἄρτης	1958–1974	Subsequently Archbishop of Athens and All Greece, 1974–1998
Theocletus Setakis	Θεόκλητος Σετάκης	1975–2014	
Maximos Papagiannis	Μάξιμος Παπαγιάννης	2014–	

== Sources ==
- Gregory, T. E. (1991). "Ioannina". In Kazhdan, Alexander (ed.). The Oxford Dictionary of Byzantium. Oxford and New York: Oxford University Press. p. 1006. ISBN 0-19-504652-8.
- Nesbitt, John; Oikonomides, Nicolas, eds. (1994). Catalogue of Byzantine Seals at Dumbarton Oaks and in the Fogg Museum of Art, Volume 2: South of the Balkans, the Islands, South of Asia Minor. Washington, DC: Dumbarton Oaks Research Library and Collection. ISBN 0-88402-226-9.
- Nicol, Donald MacGillivray (2010). The Despotate of Epiros 1267–1479: A Contribution to the History of Greece in the Middle Ages. Cambridge: Cambridge University Press. ISBN 978-0-521-13089-9.
- Soustal, Peter; Koder, Johannes (1981). Tabula Imperii Byzantini, Band 3: Nikopolis und Kephallēnia (in German). Vienna: Verlag der Österreichischen Akademie der Wissenschaften. ISBN 978-3-7001-0399-8.
