= Terin =

Terin may refer to:

- Terin Humphrey (born 1986), American retired artistic gymnast
- Terín, nickname of Juan Pizarro (baseball) (1937–2021), Major League Baseball pitcher from Puerto Rico
- Therinus (died 3rd century), spelled Terin in Albanian, Christian saint
