= Nicopolis (theme) =

Province of the Byzantine Empire

Theme of Nicopolis Νικόπολις, θέμα Νικοπόλεως
- Theme of the Byzantine Empire
- after 886 – after 1204
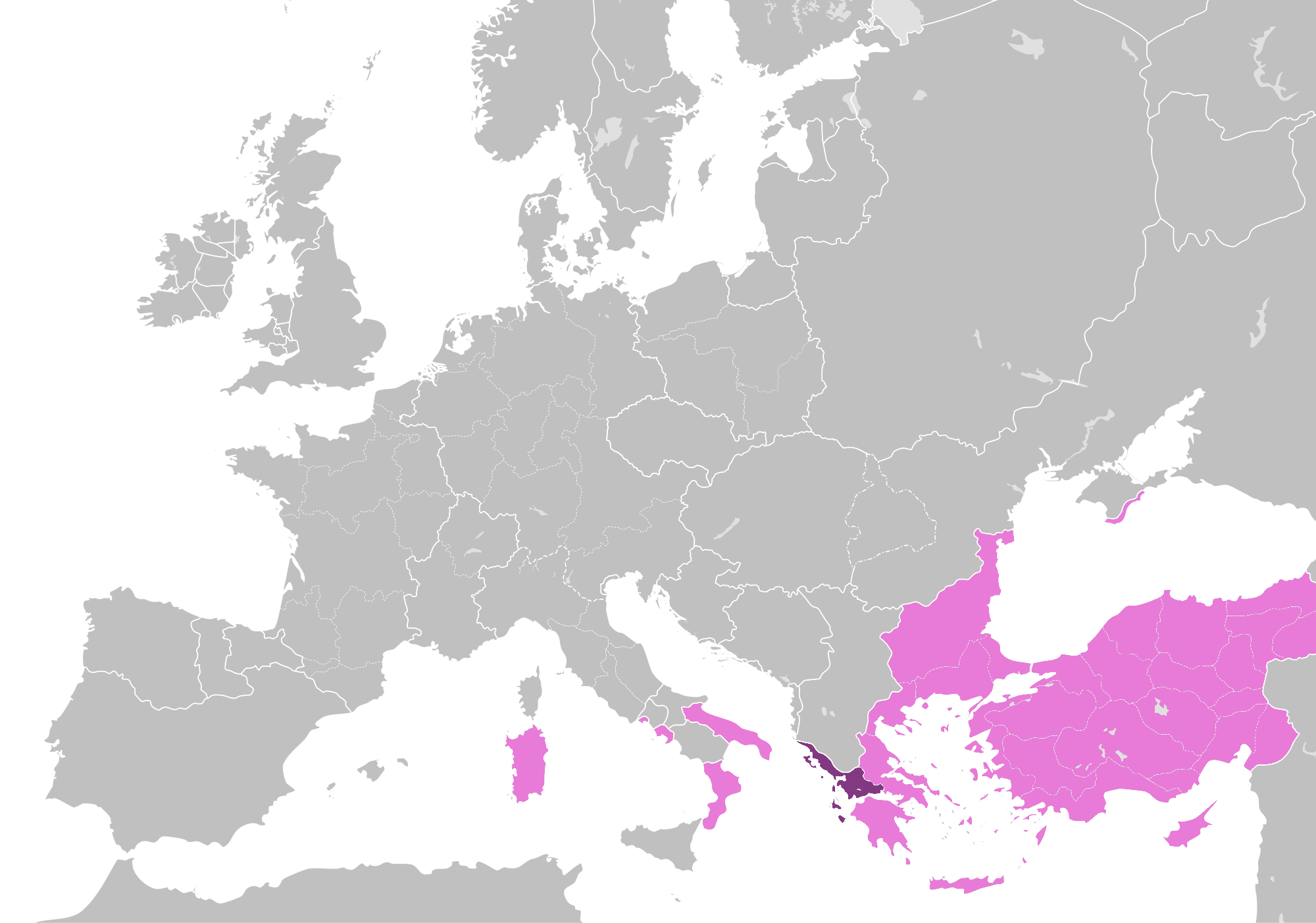
- Map of the Theme of Nicopolis within the Byzantine Empire in 1000 AD.
- Capital: Naupaktos, Arta
- Historical era: Middle Ages
  - Established: after 886
  - Fourth Crusade; transformation into Despotate of Epirus.: after 1204
Preceded by	Succeeded by
Epirus Vetus	Despotate of Epirus
- Today part of: Greece; Albania

The Theme of Nicopolis or Nikopolis (Greek: θέμα Νικοπόλεως, thema Nikopoleōs) was the name of a Byzantine theme (a military-civilian province) located in northwestern Greece, encompassing Aetolia-Acarnania and southern Epirus. It was established in the second half of the 9th century, probably after 886, and survived until the dissolution of the Byzantine Empire by the Fourth Crusade in 1204.

== History ==
Like most of the Balkans, the Epirus region had been overrun and settled by Slavic tribes in the 7th century. Very little is known about the region during the 7th–9th centuries, but from the prevalence of Slavic toponyms it is clear that they settled in large numbers throughout the region. On the other hand, the Byzantines retained their control of the Ionian Islands, which, organized in the theme of Cephallenia, were used as a base for the reassertion of imperial control, so that the region was relatively soon re-Hellenized.

It is in this context that the theme of Nicopolis was established, although the exact date is unclear. It was founded sometime in the latter half of the 9th century, between 843 and 899, when it is first attested in the Kletorologion of Philotheos. The most probable date is some time after 886, in the reign of Emperor Leo VI the Wise (r. 886–912). Sigillographic evidence suggests that the theme may have resulted from a previously-existing subordinate division (tourma) of the theme of the Peloponnese, although the historian Warren Treadgold has suggested that it formed part of the theme of Cephallenia. The exact boundaries of the Theme of Nicopolis are not known in detail, but probably matched the extent of the Metropolis of Naupaktos, established at about the same time, and which encompassed the suffragan sees of Vonditsa, Aetos, Acheloos, Rogoi, Ioannina, Hadrianopolis, Photike, and Buthrotum.

In circa 930, the province was raided and temporarily occupied by the Bulgarians. The Bulgarians returned under Tsar Samuel who moved the centre of Bulgarian power south and west to Ohrid, and in ca. 980 seized much of the region, down to the Ambracian Gulf. This is evidenced from the fact that the territories that were under Bulgarian rule formed part of the autocephalous Archbishopric of Ohrid after the Byzantine conquest of Bulgaria by Emperor Basil II in 1018: thus the sees of Chimaira, Hadrianopolis, Bela, Buthrotum, Ioannina, Kozyle, and Rogoi passed under the jurisdiction of Ohrid, while the Metropolitan of Naupaktos retained only the sees of Vonditsa, Aetos, and Acheloos. Basil II also founded a few smaller themes, comprising little more than a fortress and its immediate surroundings, those of Koloneia and Dryinoupolis, in what is today the Greco-Albanian border region. In 1040, following the murder of a corrupt and oppressive taxation official – according to John Skylitzes, the locals were notorious for being ready to revolt for fiscal reasons – most of the theme joined the uprising of Petar Delyan.

The region suffered in the Byzantine–Norman Wars of the late 11th century: Arta was unsuccessfully besieged and Ioannina was captured by Robert Guiscard. Nicopolis survived as a theme until the Fourth Crusade in 1204. A chrysobull of 1198 mentions it along with the themes of Dyrrhachium and Ioannina, and records that it was further subdivided into smaller fiscal districts (episkepseis) belonging to churches, monasteries and individuals. At the time, Arta seems to have been the provincial capital.

In the Partitio Romaniae of 1204, Nicopolis and most of Epirus were promised to Venice, but the Venetians were largely unable to effectively establish their authority except over Dyrrhachium. The Greek noble Michael Komnenos Doukas, who had married the daughter of the governor of Nicopolis, took advantage of this, and within a few years consolidated his control, first as a Venetian vassal and eventually as an independent ruler. By the time of his death in 1214/1215, Michael had established a strong state, the Despotate of Epirus, with the former theme of Nicopolis at its core.

== Geography and administration ==
The theme of Nicopolis, by the late 9th century, comprised the modern Greek prefecture of Aetolia-Acarnania and most of Epirus up to Buthrotum. In Late Antiquity, this corresponded to the province of Epirus vetus, but also included Aetolia, which was part of the province of Achaea. To the east, it bounded the theme of Hellas, probably along the river Mornos and the western slopes of the Pindus mountains, and to the north, with the theme of Dyrrhachium and the sclavinia of Vagenetia.

Despite its name, the capital of the theme was not Nicopolis, which at the time lay in ruins either due to the Slavic invasions or due to Arab raids, but Naupaktos. The theme was regularly divided into tourmai, each under its own tourmarches. In addition, as the theme was a major base for Byzantine operations across the Adriatic into southern Italy, and hosted a contingent of Mardaites marines, probably under their own katepano. Warren Treadgold conjecturally estimates its military strength at some 1,000 infantry and marines in the 9th–10th centuries.

== Sources ==
- Fine, John V. A. Jr. (1994) [1987]. The Late Medieval Balkans: A Critical Survey from the Late Twelfth Century to the Ottoman Conquest. Ann Arbor, Michigan: University of Michigan Press. ISBN 978-0-472-10079-8. OCLC 749133662.
- Kazhdan, Alexander, ed. (1991). The Oxford Dictionary of Byzantium. Oxford and New York: Oxford University Press. ISBN 0-19-504652-8.
- Nesbitt, John; Oikonomides, Nicolas, eds. (1994). Catalogue of Byzantine Seals at Dumbarton Oaks and in the Fogg Museum of Art, Volume 2: South of the Balkans, the Islands, South of Asia Minor. Washington, DC: Dumbarton Oaks Research Library and Collection. ISBN 0-88402-226-9.
- Pertusi, A. (1952). Constantino Porfirogenito: De Thematibus (in Italian). Rome: Biblioteca Apostolica Vaticana.
- Soustal, Peter; Koder, Johannes (1981). Tabula Imperii Byzantini, Band 3: Nikopolis und Kephallēnia (in German). Vienna: Verlag der Österreichischen Akademie der Wissenschaften. ISBN 978-3-7001-0399-8.
- Treadgold, Warren T. (1995). Byzantium and Its Army, 284–1081. Stanford, California: Stanford University Press. ISBN 0-8047-3163-2.
- Zakythinos, Dionysios (1941). "Μελέται περὶ τῆς διοικητικῆς διαιρέσεως καὶ τῆς ἐπαρχιακῆς διοικήσεως ἐν τῷ Βυζαντινῷ κράτει" [Studies on the administrative division and provincial administration in the Byzantine state]. Ἐπετηρίς Ἐταιρείας Βυζαντινῶν Σπουδῶν (in Greek). 17: 208–274 [239–243]. hdl:11615/19494.
