= Therinus =

Greek saint

Saint Therinus of Buthrotum
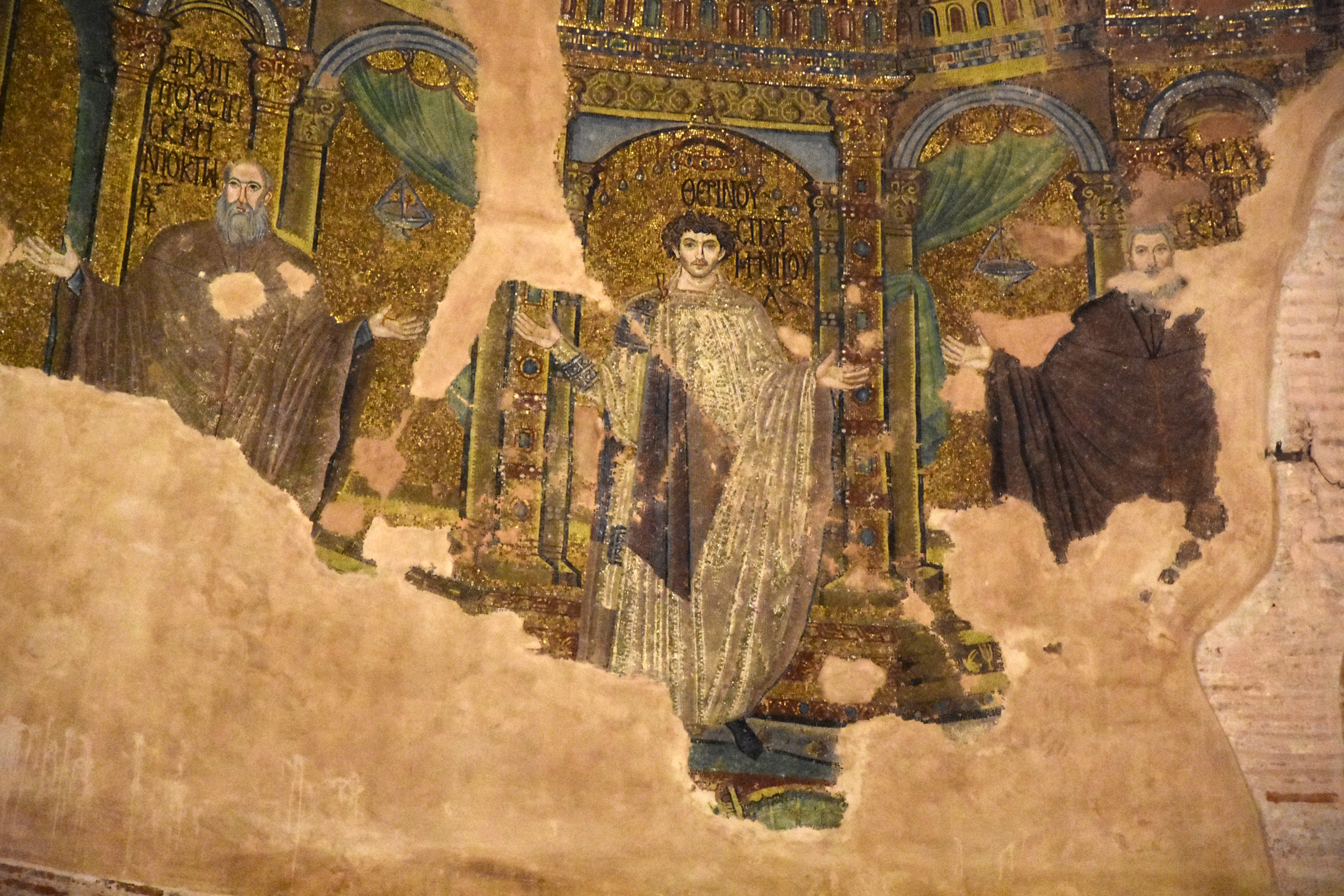
- Saint Therinus (middle), depicted in a mosaic inside the Rotunda of Thessaloniki.

Martyr
- Born: Buthrotum, Epirus Vetus, Roman Empire (modern Butrint, Albania)
- Venerated in: Eastern Orthodox Church; Catholic Church
- Feast: April 23

Therinus (Albanian: Terin, Greek: Θερινός), also known as Therinus of Buthrotum, was a Christian saint revered in Albania.

== Life and martyrdom ==
“The Martyrdom of Therinus” was a manuscript written in Epirus probably during the 5th-8th century AD. It explains during the reign of Roman Emperor Decius, the local governors of Roman provinces were replaced by more brutal ones with the intent of prosecuting more christians. In the Roman-controlled city of Buthrotum, a new governor, Phillipos, of the province of Thesprotia was confronted by Therinus who professes his faith to Christianity. Because of this, the governor decides to torture Therinus in multiple various ways and from there, the manuscript was broken off.

In the ending of the Latin version of the manuscript, from all the miraculous salvations of all the tortures that he inflicted upon Therinus, causes the governor to convert. He lives 3 and a half more years before he died and was massacred during a wave of anti-Christian persecution, most likely at the time of Emperor Decius (r. 249–251). His feast day is celebrated on April 23rd and he was buried in a city called ‘Bosrena’. The city Bosrena is believed to be a corruption of the Greek derived Botrotos (Bouthroton). Another theory proposed was the Arabic city of Bosra, which is highly unlikely.

== See also ==
- Buthrotum
- Donatus of Butrint
