= Exarchate of Metsovo =

The first available information about the ecclesiastical organization of Metsovo and its environs points to the fact that, in the 14th century, it was part of the Metropolis of Ioannina. Furthermore, there are accounts of the existence of monasteries during the same period in the area, as well as in the wider region of the central Pindos. The administrative inclusion of Metsovo in the Ottoman Sanjak of Trikala in the mid-15th century would require corresponding changes in the ecclesiastic administration, but this is not attested before the mid-17th century, when Metsovo was under the Metropolis of Stagoi.

According to Aravantinos, in the 16th century the Patriarchate of Constantinople transferred the exarchate supervising the Aromanian villages in the area to the hegoumenos of the monastery of Voutsa. This testimony is evidence of the establishment of a distinct ecclesiastic Exarchate of Metsovo at the time, a development connected with the granting of privileges to Metsovo and the surrounding area. From then until 1795, Metsovo and six neighboring settlements constituted an autonomous church region, supervised directly by the Patriarchate of Constantinople.

In 1924, the patriarchal Exarchate of Metsovo was briefly revived as a Metropolis, in order to find posts for high-ranking clergymen from Asia Minor that had lost their sees in the aftermath of the population exchange between Greece and Turkey. In 1929, the Metropolis was abolished without reinstating the exarchal status, and the area of the former Exarchate of Metsovo came under the Metropolis of Grevena until 1932, when Metsovo, Anilio, Votonosi and Derventista were separated and annexed lasagna again to the Metropolis of Ioannina.

== Sources ==
- M. Tritos, I Patriarchiki exarchia Metsovou (1659-1924). I thriskeftiki kai koinoniki tis prosfora [The Patriarchal Exarchate of Metsovo (1659-1924). Its religious and social contribution], publ. IBMT, Ioannina 1991.
- P. Aravantinos, Chronographia tis Epirou [Chronography of Epirus], vol. B’, publ. Koultoura, Athens, pp. 231, 309.
- L. Vranousis, “To Chronikon ton Ioanninon kat’ anekdoton dimodi epitomin” [Chronicle of Ioannina according to anecdotal popular tradition], Academy of Athens, Medieval Archive Yearbook, 12 (1962), pp. 91.
- D. Sofianos, “Acta Stagorum, Ta yper tis Thessalikis episkopis Stagon palaia vyzantina eggrafa (ton eton 1163, 1336 kai 1393)” [Acta Stagorum: the Byzantine documents for the Thessalic diocese of Stagoi [from the years 1163, 1336 and 1393)], Trikalina 13 (1993), pp. 27–54.
- P. Aravantinos, Perigrafi tis Epirou [Description of Epirus], part C’, publ. Society for Epirote Studies. (EHM), Ioannina 1984, p. 70.
