= Cephallenia (theme) =

Province of the Byzantine Empire

Theme of Cephallenia θέμα Κεφαλληνίας
- Theme of the Byzantine Empire
- mid/late 8th century–1185
- Map of Byzantine Greece ca. 900 AD, with the themes and major settlements.
- Capital: Cephallenia
- Historical era: Middle Ages
  - Establishment as a theme: mid/late 8th century
  - Sicilian conquest: 1185
- Today part of: Greece

The Theme of Cephallenia or Cephalonia (Greek: θέμα Κεφαλληνίας/Κεφαλονίας, thema Kephallēnias/Kephalonias) was a Byzantine theme (a military-civilian province) located in western Greece, comprising the Ionian Islands, and extant from the 8th century until partially conquered by the Kingdom of Sicily in 1185.

== History ==
During the Roman Empire, the Ionian Islands (Corfu, Cephalonia, Zakynthos, Ithaca, Leucas and Cythera) were variously part of the provinces of Achaea and Epirus vetus. Except for Cythera, these formed the separate theme of Cephallenia. The islands remained largely unaffected by the Slavic invasion and settlement of the 7th century, and formed a base for the re-establishment of imperial control and the re-Hellenization of the mainland coast.

It is unknown when exactly the theme of Cephallenia was established. Emperor Constantine VII Porphyrogennetos (r. 913–959) affirms in his work, De administrando imperio, that it was originally a tourma (a division) of the theme of Longobardia in Southern Italy, and that it was raised to a strategis (a "generalship"), but not a full theme, by Emperor Leo VI the Wise (r. 886–912). This is, however, clearly an error, for several instances of generals (strategoi) of Cephallenia are known through sources before that date. Thus, the Taktikon Uspensky of 842/843 clearly mentions a strategos of Cephallenia, and the Latin chronicle Annales regni Francorum mentions one already in 809. A number of seals further push the establishment of the circumscription of Cephallenia, at least as a strategis if not as a theme, back to the middle or late 8th century.

Constantine VII's confusion, however, reflects the close relation of Cephallenia with the imperial holdings in southern Italy: the Ionian Islands served as the main communication link with and staging base for operations in Italy, and defended the maritime approaches of the Ionian and Adriatic seas against Arab pirates. Contrary to Porphyrogennetos's account, Longobardia was probably initially constituted as a tourma of Cephallenia after the Byzantine recapture of Bari in 876. Nevertheless, in several cases, the commands of Cephallenia and Longobardia (or, alternatively, of Nicopolis on the Epirus mainland) were thereafter held by the same person.

The theme's strategos was probably based mostly at Cephallenia, but is also attested elsewhere, such as Corfu. In the De administrando imperio, the theme ranks seventh among the "Western", or European themes; as with all the European themes, its strategos did not receive his salary, 12 pounds of gold, from the imperial treasury, but was paid from his theme's tax revenue. Cephallenia was important chiefly in a maritime context, and had its own fleet, including a number of Mardaites as marines and rowers, under a tourmarches. Other tourmarchai and subordinate commanders headed the theme's army garrison. The historian Warren Treadgold conjecturally estimates the theme's military forces at some 2,000 men in the 9th century The theme was also frequently used as a place of exile for political prisoners.

The Theme of Cephallenia is frequently mentioned in military operations in the 9th–11th centuries. In 809, the strategos Paul defeated a Venetian fleet off Dalmatia. In 880, the admiral Nasar heavily defeated an Arab pirate fleet that was plundering the theme's islands, and troops from Cephallenia subsequently participated in the Byzantine offensive in Italy. Mardaites from Cephallenia are then recorded in the failed expedition of 949 against the Emirate of Crete. The last mention of a strategos of Cephallenia comes in 1011, when Kontoleon Tornikios was sent to Italy to quell a Lombard revolt. Following the collapse of Byzantine control in southern Italy in the mid-11th century, the theme's importance declined, and it was headed by civilian governors, styled krites ("judges").

From the late 11th century, the Ionian Islands became a battleground in the Byzantine–Norman Wars. The island of Corfu was held by the Normans in 1081–1085 and 1147–1149, while the Venetians unsuccessfully besieged it in 1122–1123. The island of Cephalonia was also unsuccessfully besieged in 1085, but was plundered in 1099 by the Pisans and in 1126 by the Venetians. Finally, Corfu and the rest of the theme except for Leucas were captured by the Normans under William II of Sicily in 1185. Although Corfu was recovered by the Byzantines by 1191, the other islands henceforth remained lost to Byzantium, and formed a County palatine of Cephalonia and Zakynthos under William's Greek admiral Margaritus of Brindisi.

== Sources ==
- Kazhdan, Alexander, ed. (1991). The Oxford Dictionary of Byzantium. Oxford and New York: Oxford University Press. ISBN 0-19-504652-8.
- Nesbitt, John; Oikonomides, Nicolas, eds. (1994). Catalogue of Byzantine Seals at Dumbarton Oaks and in the Fogg Museum of Art, Volume 2: South of the Balkans, the Islands, South of Asia Minor. Washington, DC: Dumbarton Oaks Research Library and Collection. ISBN 0-88402-226-9.
- Oikonomides, Nicolas (1972). Les listes de préséance byzantines des IXe et Xe siècles (in French). Paris: Editions du Centre National de la Recherche Scientifique.
- Pertusi, A. (1952). Constantino Porfirogenito: De Thematibus (in Italian). Rome, Italy: Biblioteca Apostolica Vaticana.
- Soustal, Peter; Koder, Johannes (1981). Tabula Imperii Byzantini, Band 3: Nikopolis und Kephallēnia (in German). Vienna: Verlag der Österreichischen Akademie der Wissenschaften. ISBN 978-3-7001-0399-8.
- Treadgold, Warren T. (1995). Byzantium and Its Army, 284–1081. Stanford, California: Stanford University Press. ISBN 0-8047-3163-2.
