= Cyriacus the Anchorite =

Byzantine saint from Corinth (448–557)

Saint Kyriakos the Anchorite
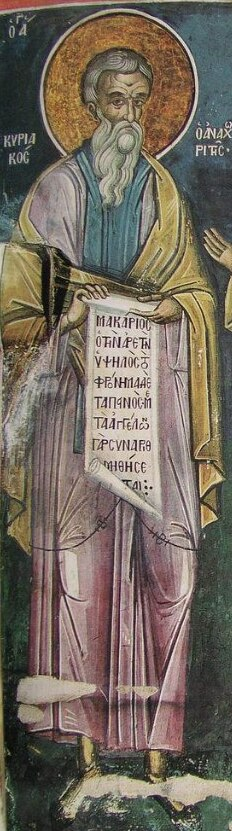
- Fresco from Dionysiou Monastery

Hermit
- Born: 448; Corinth, Greece
- Died: 557 (aged 108–109); Cave of St. Chariton, Palestine
- Venerated in: Eastern Orthodox Church; Eastern Catholic Churches; Oriental Orthodox Churches
- Canonized: Pre-Congregation
- Feast: 29 September (Eastern Orthodox and Eastern Catholic); 10 November (Coptic Orthodox); 21 January (Armenian Apostolic)

Kyriakos the Anchorite (also known as Cyriacus the Hermit; Ancient Greek: Ὅσιος Κυριακός ὁ Ἀναχωρητής, romanized: Hosios Kyriakos ho Anachōrētēs; 448–557) was a Greek Christian monk and saint.

== Early life ==
His father was a priest named John and his mother's name was Eudoxia. Kyriakos had Bishop Peter of Corinth for a relative, who made Kyriakos a reader in church.

Kyriakos's studies of the scriptures encouraged him to want what the culture deemed a pure and saintly life. Cyriacus, before turning 18, attended a church service on Matthew 16:24 ("Whosoever would to come after Me, let him deny himself and raise up his cross and follow Me") that so deeply moved him he immediately he went to the harbour, got onto a ship, and set off to Jerusalem instead of going home.

After visiting holy places of Christianity, Kyriakos dwelt for several months at a monastery not far from Sion. This placed him in obedience to Hegumenos Abba Eustorgius. With his support he made his way to the wilderness Lavra of Euthymius the Great (January 20). Euthymius was impressed by him and tonsured him into the monastic schema and placed him under the guidance of Gerasimus (March 4). He then pursued asceticism at the Jordan in the monastery of Theoctistus.

Gerasimus, seeing that Kyriakos was still quite young, ordered him to live in the community with the brethren. Gerasimus became something of a mentor to the young man and each Sunday imparted the Holy Mysteries of his faith to his disciple. The young monk took to monastic obediences: he prayed fervently, he slept little, he ate food only every other day, and nourished himself with bread and water.

After the death of Gerasimos, the twenty-seven-year-old Kyriakos intended to return to the Lavra of Euthymios, but he had since died. Therefore, Kyriakos asked for a solitary cell where he pursued asceticism in silence. During this period he communicated only with the monk Thomas. Later even that ended as Thomas was sent to Alexandria where he was consecrated bishop. This meant Kyriakos spent ten years in total silence. At 37 years of age he was ordained to the diaconate.

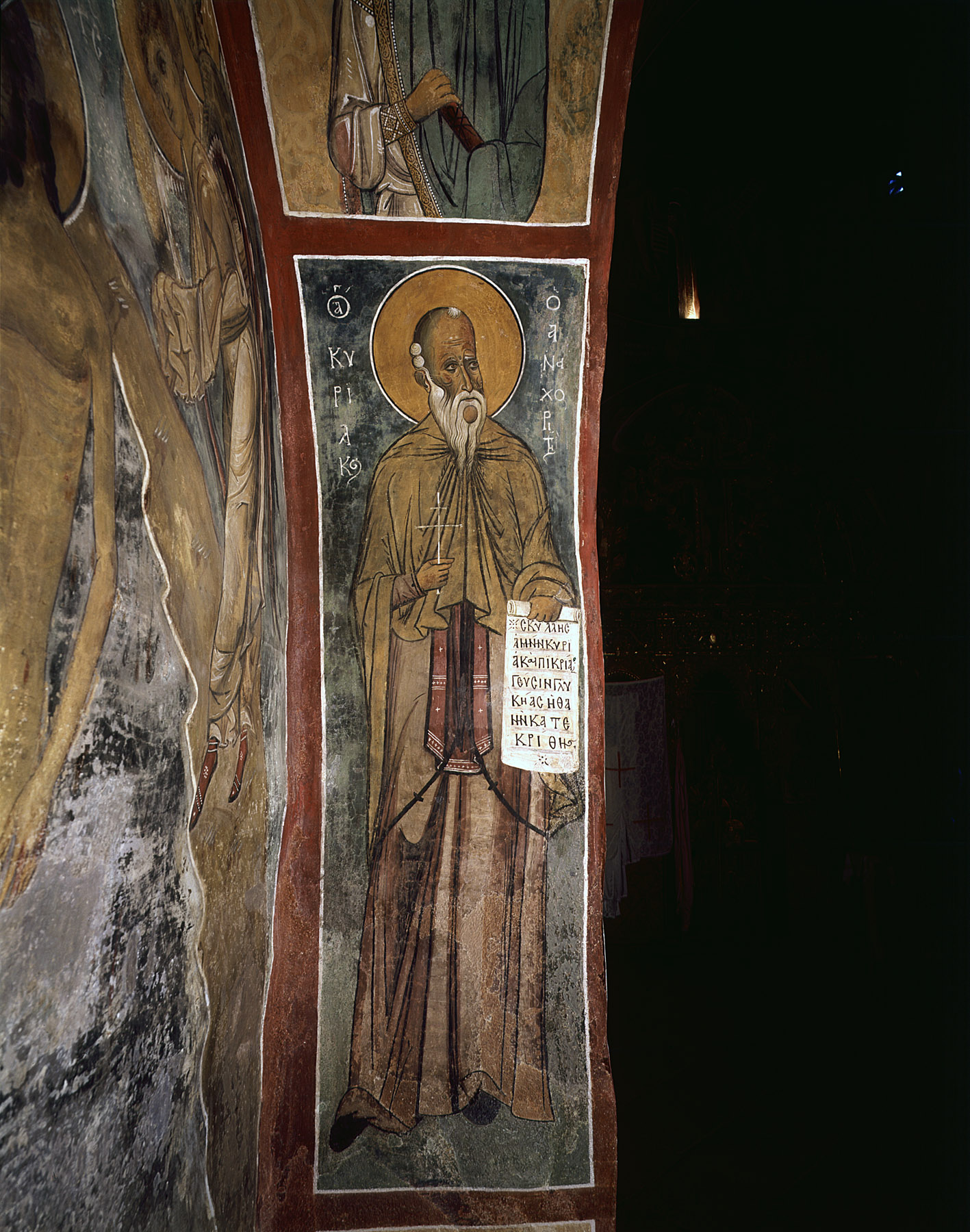
Fresco of Saint Cyriacus the Anchorite from the Panagia tou Araka church

When a split occurred between the monasteries of Euthymius and Theoctistus, Kyriakos withdrew to the Souka monastery of Chariton (September 28). At this monastery they received even tonsured monks as novices, and so was Kyriakos received. He toiled at the regular monastic obediences. After several years, Kyriakos was ordained priest and chosen canonarch and did this obedience for eighteen years. He would spend thirty years at the monastery of Chariton.

Strict fasting and devotion distinguished Kyriakos even among the ascetics of the Lavra. In his cell each night he read the Psalter, interrupting the reading only to go to church at midnight. The ascetic slept very little. When the monk reached seventy years of age, he went to the Natoufa wilderness taking with him his disciple John.

In the desert the hermits fed themselves only with bitter herbs, which hagiographical accounts say were rendered edible. After five years one of the inhabitants found out about the ascetics and brought to them his son and Kyriakos reportedly healed him. From that time many people began to approach the monk with their needs, but he sought complete solitude and fled to the Rouva wilderness, where he dwelt five years more. But the sick still came for him so he helped who he could. At his 80th year of life Kyriakos fled to the hidden Sousakim wilderness, where two dried up streams passed by. The brethren of the Souka monastery came to him seven years after his arrival, beseeching his spiritual help during the time of debilitating hunger and illness. After his intervention seemed to improve the situation they wished him to return to the monastery. Therefore, he settled in a cave which Chariton had once lived.

Kyriakos worked against the religious movement Origenism. By prayer and by word, he led many to abandon it for a strengthened Orthodox faith. According to Eastern Orthodox tradition the Theotokos appeared to him to strengthen him in his efforts against Origenism. After the deaths of Nonnus and Leontius, which it is said he predicted, the movement ceased to spread.

At the age of ninety-nine, Kyriakos again went off to Susakim and lived there with his disciple John. This period is full of several legends involving him saving people from lions or his prayers causing rain to fall.

For the two years before his death Kyriakos returned to the monastery and again settled into the cave of Chariton. Until the end of his life he was never idle in prayer or work. Before his death Kyriakos summoned the brethren and blessed them all. He died in 557.

== Veneration ==
In Serbia, the feast of Saint Cyriacus marks the end of the grape harvest and is celebrated with a Slava.

== Sources ==
- Kettern, Bernd. "Kyriakos". Biographisch-Bibliographisches Kirchenlexikon (BBKL). Vol. 4. pp. 871–873. Archived from the original on 2007-06-29.
