= Glyki =

Glyki Γλυκή
- Community
- Location within Greece
- Coordinates: 39°19′35″N 20°36′28″E
- Country: Greece
- Administrative region: Epirus
- Regional unit: Thesprotia
- Municipality: Souli

Population (2021)
  - Community: 622
- Time zone: UTC+2 (EET)
  - Summer (DST): UTC+3 (EEST)

Glyki (Greek: Γλυκή) or Glyky (Γλυκύ) is a village in Thesprotia, in northwestern Greece.

== History ==
The site of Glyki is identified with the ancient city of Euroea, which was abandoned in the early 7th century due to Slavic attacks.

The modern settlement is first mentioned as the chartoularaton of "Gliki" in 1205. The name "Glykys" apparently derives from the nearby Acheron River, whose estuary was known as Γλυκύς λιμὴν ("sweet port") already in Antiquity; by the 11th century, the name had been transferred to the river itself.

The settlement of Glyky became a bishopric, which by 1337 had been united with the neighbouring see of Bouthrotos (Βοθρωτοὺ καὶ Γλυκέως). The joint bishopric was subordinated in the second half of the 15th century to the Metropolis of Ioannina. The ruins of a three-aisled middle Byzantine cathedral, itself erected over an earlier church, survive next to the Church of St. Donatus. Possibly the site is the same as the cathedral dedicated to St. Donatus that was built under Theodosius I (r. 379–395).

During the early months of the Greek War of Independence, the Treaty of Glyki between the Souliotes and the Ottoman Albanian beys of the area was concluded here.

== Modern period ==
In the early 20th century, the village was one of the Orthodox Albanian-speaking villages of Thesprotia. During the Balkan Wars, Glyki was burned by pro-Ottoman Albanian irregulars.

In modern times, the village's population was employed in livestock raising and agriculture, especially rice. From 238 inhabitants in 1928, it grew to 481 in 1971, before declining to 438 in 2011. Since 2011, it is part of the Acherontas municipal unit (previously a municipality) of the Souli municipality.

== Sources ==
- Baltsiotis, Lambros (2009). The Muslim Chams from their entry into the Greek state until the start of the Greco-Italian war (1913-1940): the story of a community from millet to nation [Οι μουσουλμάνοι Τσάμηδες από την είσοδό τους στο ελληνικό κράτος μέχρι την έναρξη του ελληνοϊταλικού πολέμου (1913-1940): η ιστορία μιας κοινότητας από το millet στο έθνος] (Thesis). University of Panteion.
