= Euroea (Epirus) =

Coordinates: 39°20′09″N 20°36′26″E

Euroea or Euroia (Ancient Greek: Εὔροια; also transcribed as Eurœa) was a city in Epirus, in western Greece, during late antiquity. It was abandoned in the early 7th century due to Slavic invasions. During the 4th–8th centuries, it was a bishopric. Since the 18th century, it has also been a titular see of the Catholic Church. Its site is located near the modern village of Glyki in Greece.

== History ==
St. Donatus, bishop of Euroea, lived under Theodosius I (r. 379–395) and performed miracles, including providing a local settlement with abundant watersources (likely connected to the name "Euroea", "well-flowing"). A church dedicated to St. Donatus was erected, probably on the site of an ancient pagan temple (Omphalion). The town belonged to the Roman province of Epirus vetus.

Bishops of Euroea are attested at councils in the 5th and 6th centuries, and the city is mentioned by Hierocles. According to Procopius, Emperor Justinian I (r. 527–565) resettled the inhabitants of Euroea to an islet in a neighbouring lake and built there a strong city, commonly thought to be on the site of Ioannina.

As a result of the Slavic invasions, in 603 the Bishop of Euroea and the inhabitants, taking the relics of St. Donatus with them, fled to Kassiopi on Corfu. The original site of Euroea is unclear: Michel Le Quien identified it with modern Paramythia, others with the nearby ancient settlement of Photice. It is now tentatively located near the village of Glyki.

== Bishopric ==
The first (and only) mention of the bishopric in one of the Notitiae Episcopatuum is in the so-called "iconoclast notitia" (compiled some time after 787), where it is listed (as Εὐρόσου) as the second among the suffragans of the Metropolis of Nicopolis.

The known bishops are:

- St. Donatus, under Theodosius I (r. 379–395)
- Mark, participant in the Second Council of Ephesus in 449 and the Council of Chalcedon in 451
- Eugenius, signatory of a letter by the synod of Epirus vetus on the Council of Chalcedon and the murder of Proterius of Alexandria to Emperor Leo I the Thracian
- Theodotus, attended the 536 council under Patriarch Menas of Constantinople
- John I, mentioned by Procopius
- John II, mentioned in a letter by Pope Gregory the Great; he presided over the flight of the Euroeans to Corfu

== Catholic titular see ==
The Roman Catholic Church has established "Eurœa" (since 1933: "Eurœa in Epiro") as a titular see. Its incumbents are:

- Bishop Jean de Brunet de Pujols de Castelpers de Panat (1739.09.30 – ?)
- Bishop Joachin Salvetti (艾若亞敬), O.F.M. (1815.02.21 – 1843.09.21)
- Bishop Gabriel Grioglio, O.F.M. (1844.03.02 – 1891.01.09)
- Bishop Salvatore di Pietro, S.J. (1893.01.03 – 1898.08.23)
- Bishop Jean-Baptiste-Marie Budes de Guébriant (光若翰), M.E.P. (later Archbishop) (1910.08.12 – 1921.12.11)
- Bishop Giovanni Battista Peruzzo, C.P. (later Archbishop) (1924.01.18 – 1928.10.19)
- Bishop Pedro Dionisio Tibiletti (1929.01.25 – 1934.09.13)
- Blessed Bishop Florentino Asensio Barroso (1935.11.11 – 1936.08.09)
- Bishop Alfredo Del Tomba (1937.07.10 – 1944.08.10)
- Bishop Ezio Barbieri (1945.07.21 – 1949.08.02)
- Bishop Policarpo da Costa Vaz (高德華) (1950.04.17 – 1954.01.29)
- Bishop João Pereira Venâncio, O.R.C. (1954.09.30 – 1958.09.13)
- Bishop Alfonso Niehues (later Archbishop) (1959.01.08 – 1965.08.03)
