= Epirus (Roman province) =

Roman province (in Greece and Albania)

Provincia Epiri Ἐπαρχία Ἠπείρου
- Province of the Roman Empire
- 100s or 110s AD–7th century
- The province of Epirus within the Roman Empire, c. 125 AD
- Capital: Nicopolis
- Historical era: Antiquity
  - Established: 100s or 110s AD
  - Slavic Invasion: 7th century
  - Transformed into the Theme of Nicopolis: 7th century
Preceded by
Epirote League
Aetolian League
Succeeded by
Nicopolis (theme)
Dyrrhachium (theme)
Cephallenia (theme)
Early Slavs
- Today part of: Greece; Albania

The province of Epirus (Latin: Provincia Epiri, Koine and Medieval Greek: Ἐπαρχία Ἠπείρου, Eparchía Ēpeírou) was a province of the Roman Empire, covering the region of Ancient Epirus. Rome first annexed the region in 167 BC, in the aftermath of the Third Macedonian War, and initially put the region in the larger Roman province of Macedonia, which at the time covered the whole of the Hellenistic world in mainland Europe. In 27 BC, Epirus and Achaea were separated from Macedonia and grouped into the senatorial province of Achaea, with the exception of its northernmost part, which remained part of the province of Macedonia. Under Emperor Trajan, sometime between 103 and 114 AD, Epirus became a separate province, under a procurator Augusti. The new province extended from the Gulf of Aulon (Vlorë) and the Acroceraunian Mountains in the north to the lower course of the Acheloos River in the south, and included the northern Ionian Islands of Corfu, Lefkada, Ithaca, Cephallonia, and Zakynthos.

== History ==
Rome had maintained a military presence in Epirus since the First Macedonian War, when it used Epirus as an entry-point for Roman troops in Greece. Rome would continue to use Epirus as a gateway for its troops in the Second and Third Macedonian Wars. During the third war, the hitherto neutral Epirote League split, with the Molossians siding with the Macedonians and the Chaonians and Thesprotians supporting the Romans. The war ended disastrously for Epirus: 150,000 Molossians were enslaved and the region fell to Rome.

The status of the region between 167 and 146 BC is unclear, but in 146 BC, it was grouped in the larger Roman province of Macedonia. During Caesar's Civil War, Julius Caesar used Bouthroton as a naval base, and later drew up plans for a colonia there for his civil war veterans shortly before his death. Augustus later took up these plans and made the city a colony for his own veterans, after his victory over Mark Antony at the War of Actium. New residents expanded the city and the construction included an aqueduct, thermae, houses, a forum complex and a nymphaeum. During this period, the size of the town was doubled. A number of new structures were built next to the existing ones, especially around the theatre and the temple of Asklepios.

Augustus also separated Epirus and Achaea from Macedonia in 27 BC, but it remained part of the province of Achaia until sometime between 104 and 117 AD, when Trajan made it a province in its own right.

=== Epirus Vetus and Epirus Nova ===
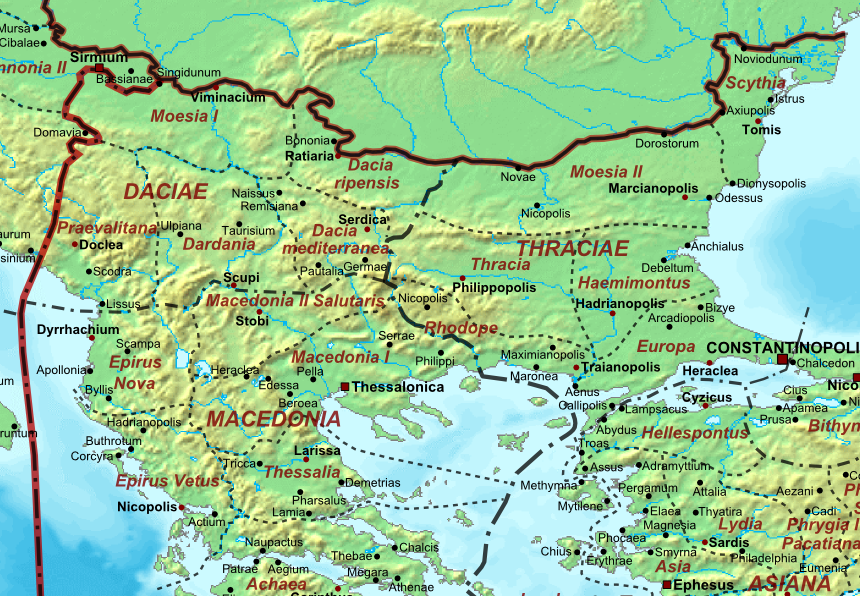
The Roman provinces in the Balkans including Epirus Vetus and Epirus Nova, ca. 400 AD.

Sometime during the provincial reorganization by Diocletian (r. 284–305), the western portion of the province of Macedonia along the Adriatic coast was split off into a new province, called "New Epirus" (Latin: Epirus Nova) which roughly corresponded to southern Illyria proper, historically inhabited by Illyrian tribes. Epirus proper thereafter became known as "Old Epirus" (Latin: Epirus Vetus, Ancient Greek: Παλαιὰ Ἤπειρος).

=== Late Antiquity ===
The two Epirote provinces became part of the Diocese of Moesia, until it was divided in ca. 369 into the dioceses of Macedonia and Dacia, when they became part of the former. In the 4th century, Epirus was still a stronghold of paganism, and was aided by Emperor Julian (r. 361–363 AD) and his praetorian prefect Claudius Mamertinus through reduction in taxes and the rebuilding of the provincial capital, Nicopolis. According to Jordanes, the Visigoths raided the area in 380. With the division of the Empire on the death of Theodosius I in 395, Epirus became part of the Eastern Roman or Byzantine Empire. In 395–397, the Visigoths under Alaric plundered Greece. They remained in Epirus for a few years, until 401, and again in 406–407, during Alaric's alliance with the Western Roman generalissimo Stilicho in order to wrest Eastern Illyricum from the Eastern Empire.

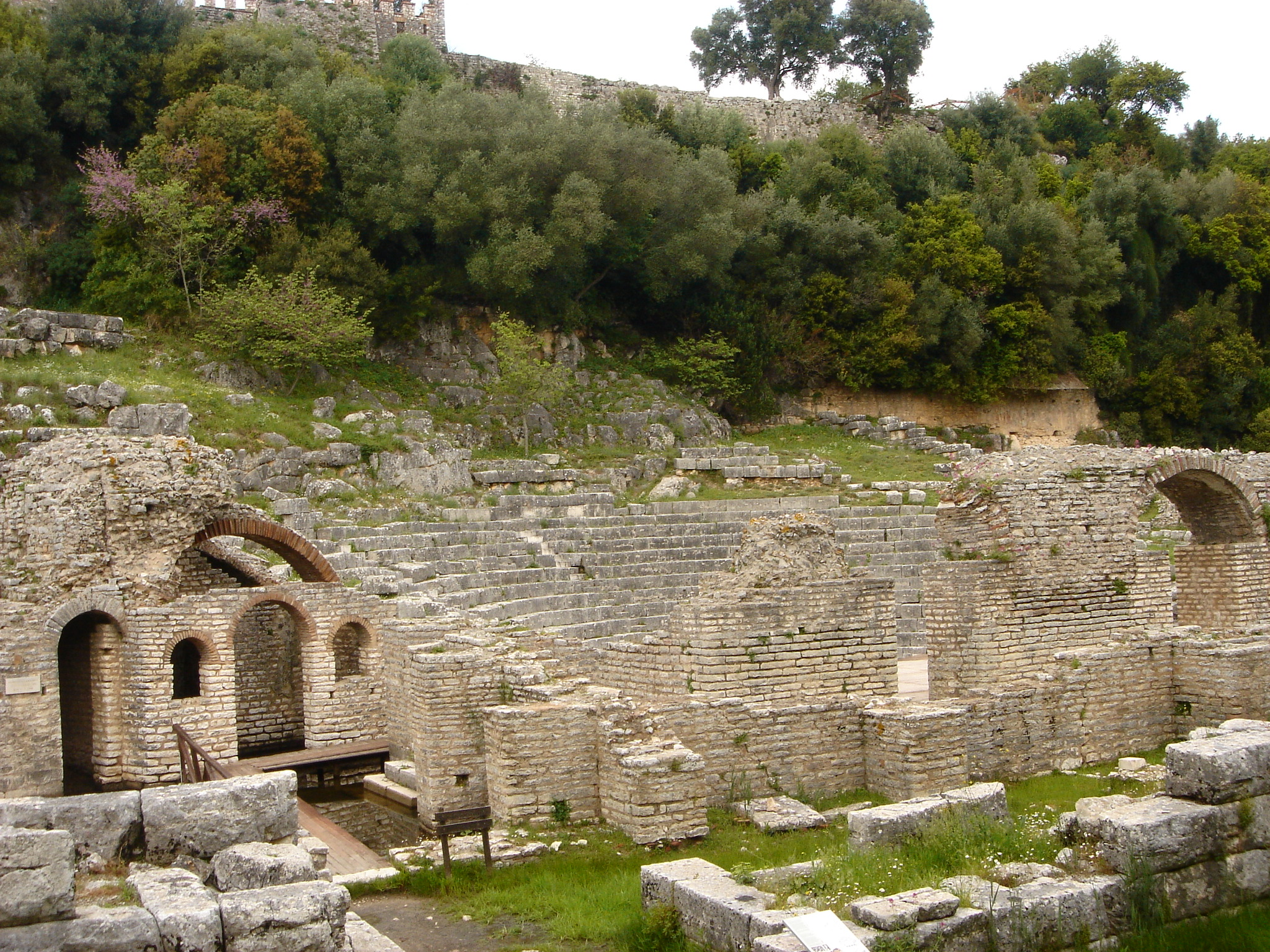
Ruins of Buthrotum

From 467 on, the Ionian Islands and the coasts of Epirus became subject to raids by the Vandals, who had taken over the North African provinces and established their own kingdom, the Kingdom of the Vandals, centred on Carthage. The Vandals seized Nicopolis in 474 as a bargaining chip in their negotiations with Emperor Zeno, and plundered Zakynthos, killing many of its inhabitants and capturing many others and taking them into slavery. Epirus Nova became a battleground during the power struggles of the Ostrogoths after 479, in which the Byzantines were involved. A Gothic attempt to take Durrës was repulsed by Roman forces during this period.

In 517, a raid of the Getae or Antae reached Greece, including Epirus Vetus. Procopius of Caesarea claims in his Secret History that under Justinian I (r. 527–565 AD), the entirety of the Balkan provinces was raided by barbarians every year. However, this is considered rhetorical hyperbole by modern scholars, as only a single Slavic raid to the environs of Dyrrhachium, in 548–9, has been documented. Procopius further reports that in 551, the Ostrogothic king Totila sent his fleet to raid the shores of Epirus, in an attempt to interdict the Byzantines' lines of communication with Italy during the Gothic War, in which the Byzantines were trying to annex his kingdom. In response to these raids, and to repair the damage done by two destructive earthquakes in 522, Justinian initiated a wide-ranging programme of reconstruction and re-fortification: Hadrianopolis was rebuilt, albeit in reduced extent, and renamed Justinianopolis, while Euroea was moved further inland - this has been traditionally identified with the founding of Ioannina. Procopius also claims that no less than 36 smaller fortresses in Epirus Vetus—most of them not identifiable today—were either rebuilt or built anew.

=== Loss and Byzantine reconquest ===
Map of Byzantine Greece ca. 900 AD, with the themes and major settlements

In the late 6th century, much of Greece, including Epirus, fell under the control of the Avars and their Slavic allies. This is placed by the Chronicle of Monemvasia in the year 587, and is further corroborated by evidence that several sees were abandoned by their bishops by 591. Thus, in c. 590 the bishop, clergy and people of Euroea fled their city, carrying with them the relics of their patron saint, St. Donatus, to Cassiope in Corfu.

The restoration of Byzantine rule seems to have proceeded from the islands, chiefly Cephallonia, which was certainly under firm Imperial control in c. 702, when Philippicus Bardanes was banished there. The gradual restoration of Imperial rule is evidenced further from the participation of local bishops in councils in Constantinople: whereas only the bishop of Dyrrhachium participated in the Ecumenical Councils of 680–1 and 692, a century later the bishops of Dyrrhachium, Nicopolis, Corfu, Cephallonia, and Zakynthos are attested in the Second Council of Nicaea in 787.

In about the middle of the 8th century, the Theme of Cephallenia was established; this, along with the Theme of Nicopolis, which was established in the 9th century, covered the former region of Epirus Vetus. The Theme of Dyrrhachium, established in the 9th century, covered what was once Epirus Nova, and Byzantine rule in Epirus in the early Middle Ages would continue through these new provinces.

== Economy ==
The province, especially the northern towns, benefitted greatly from the construction of the Via Egnatia to the north. Due to both its traditionally reputed livestock and its proximity to the Italian peninsula, Epirus became a major exporter of cattle and luxury goods like racehorses to Italy, where the latter were in great demand for the popular chariot races in Rome.

Epirus also had significant populations of Italian settlers with large estates, attracted by the potential for pastoral agriculture. It is possible that these settlers had significant impact on the demographics and commerce of the province.

== Cities and settlements ==
The Synecdemus of Hierocles, composed in ca. 527–8 AD but probably reflecting the situation in the first half of the 5th century, reports eleven cities for Old Epirus:

- Nicopolis, the capital
- Dodona
- Euroea
- Hadrianopolis
- Appon
- Phoenice
- Anchiasmos
- Buthrotum
- Photike
- Corfu Island
- Ithaca Island.

New Epirus, with its capital at Dyrrhachium, comprised nine cities.

== Gallery ==
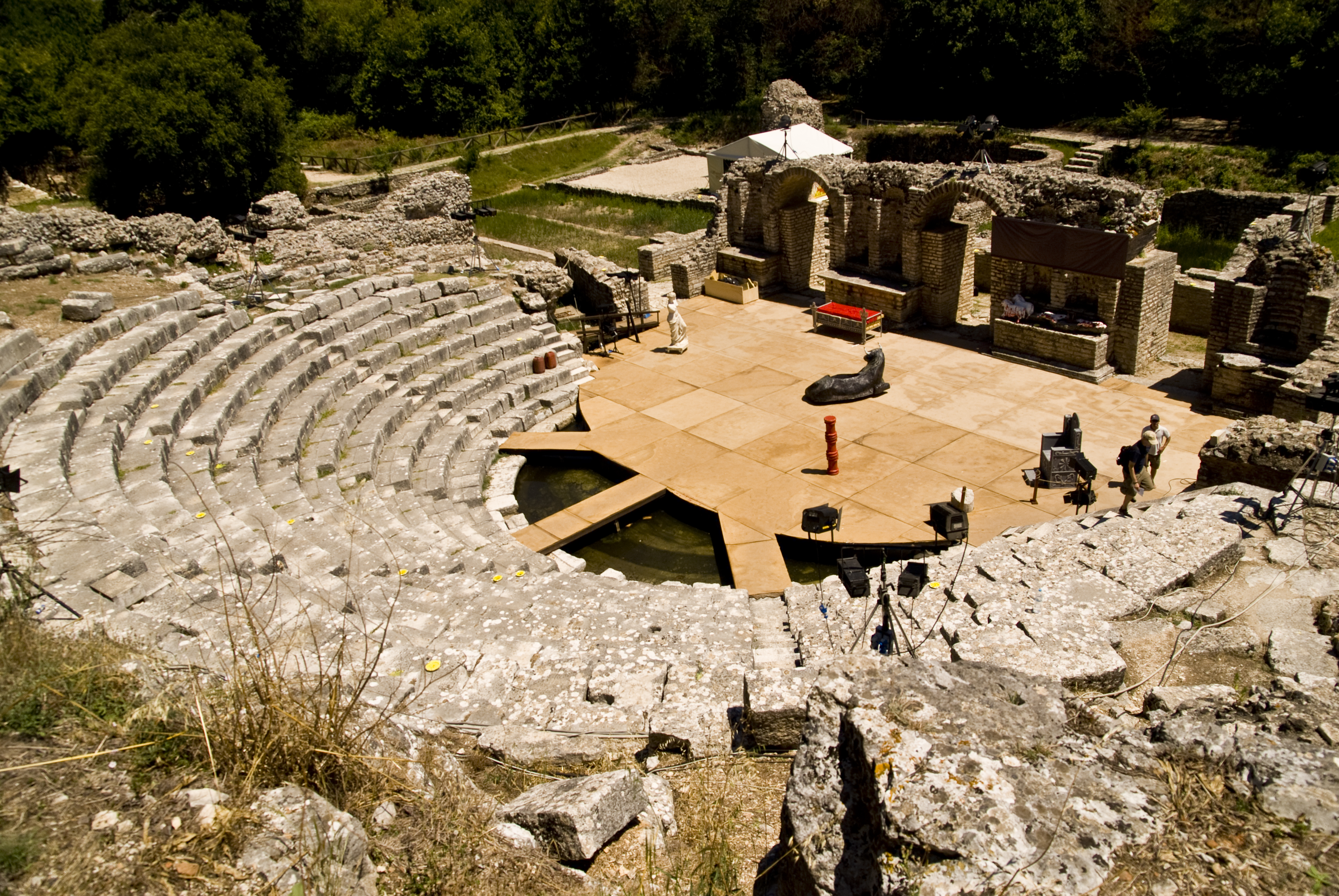
Roman theatre of Butrint

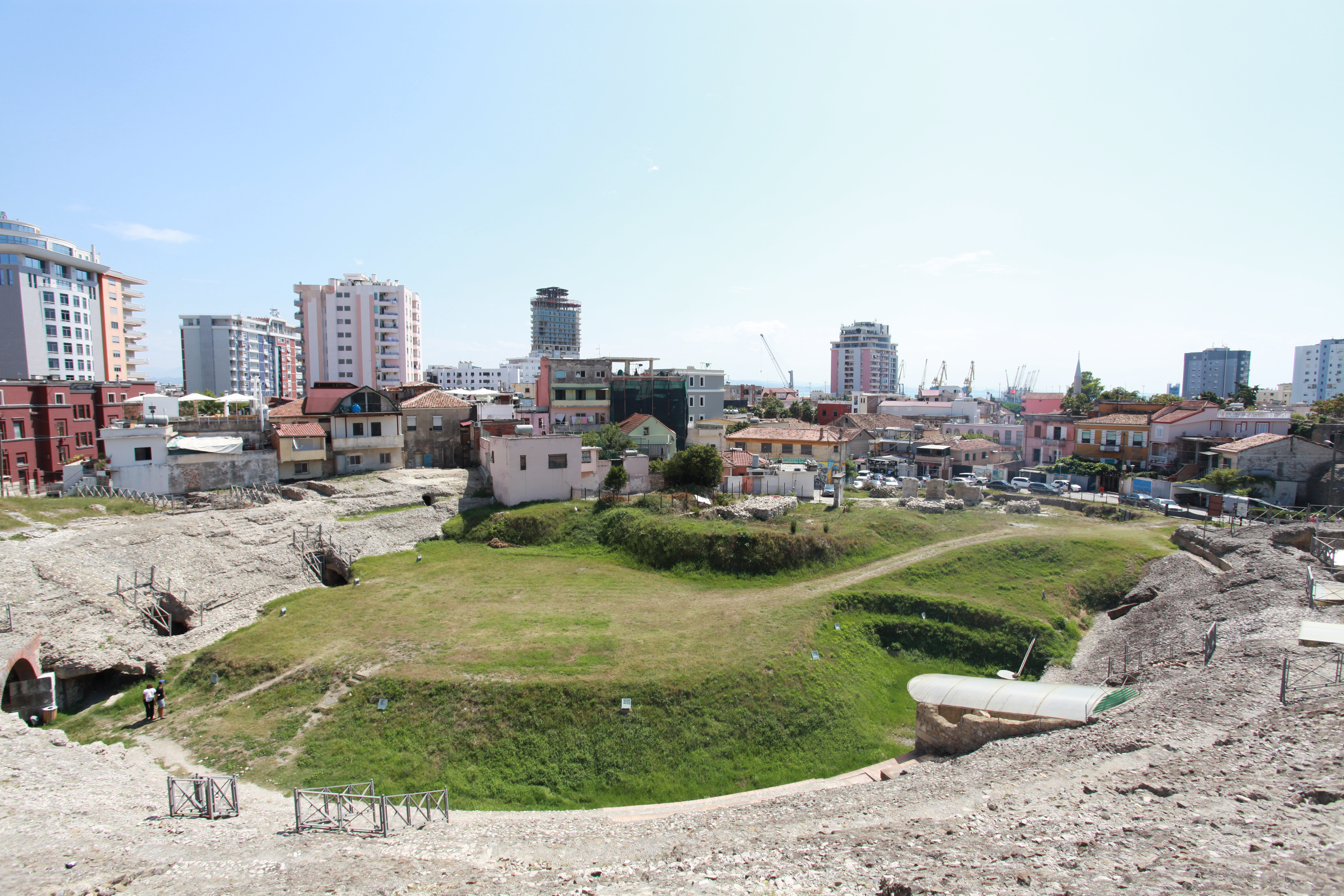
Roman amphitheatre of Dyrrachium

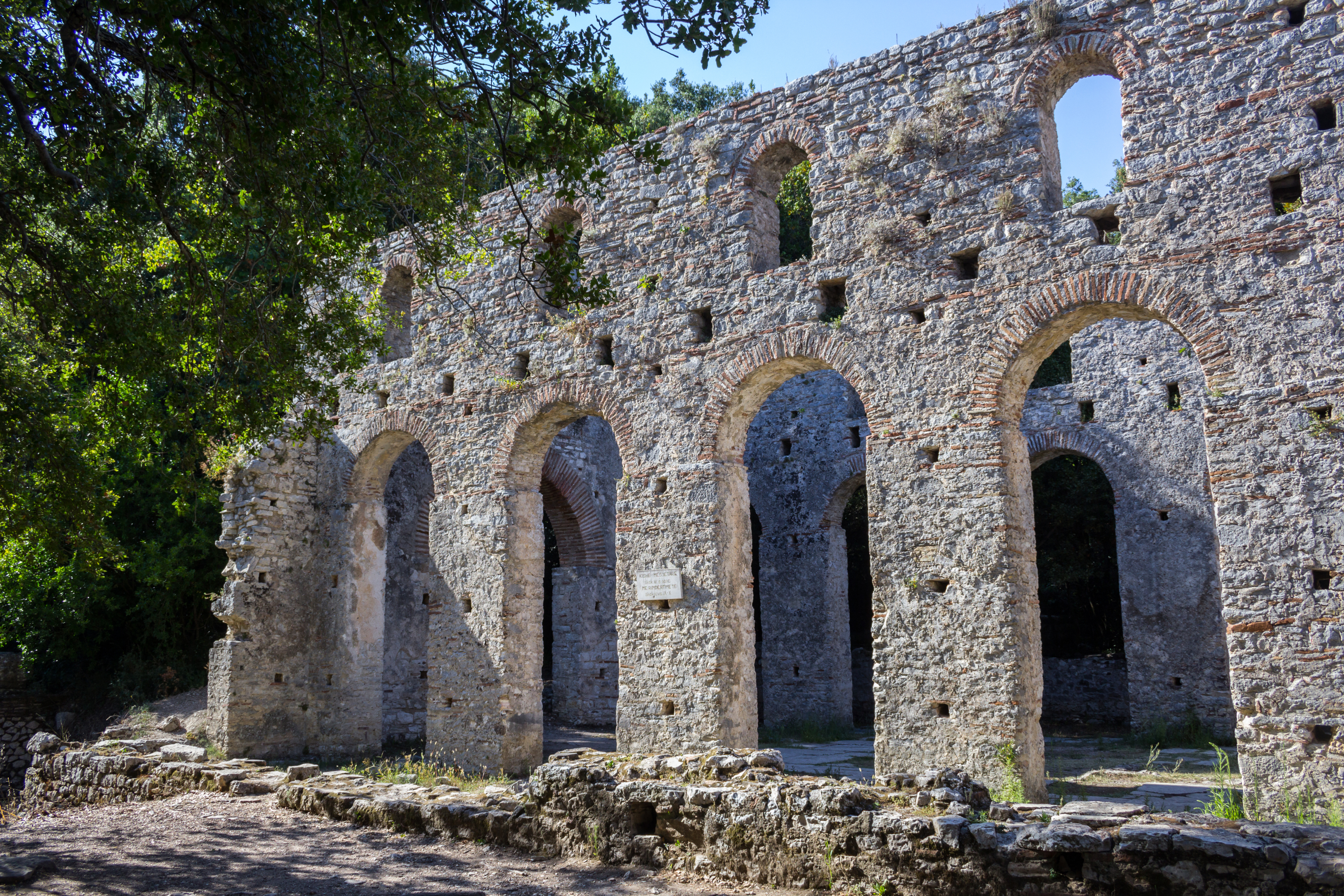
Early Christian basilica, Butrint

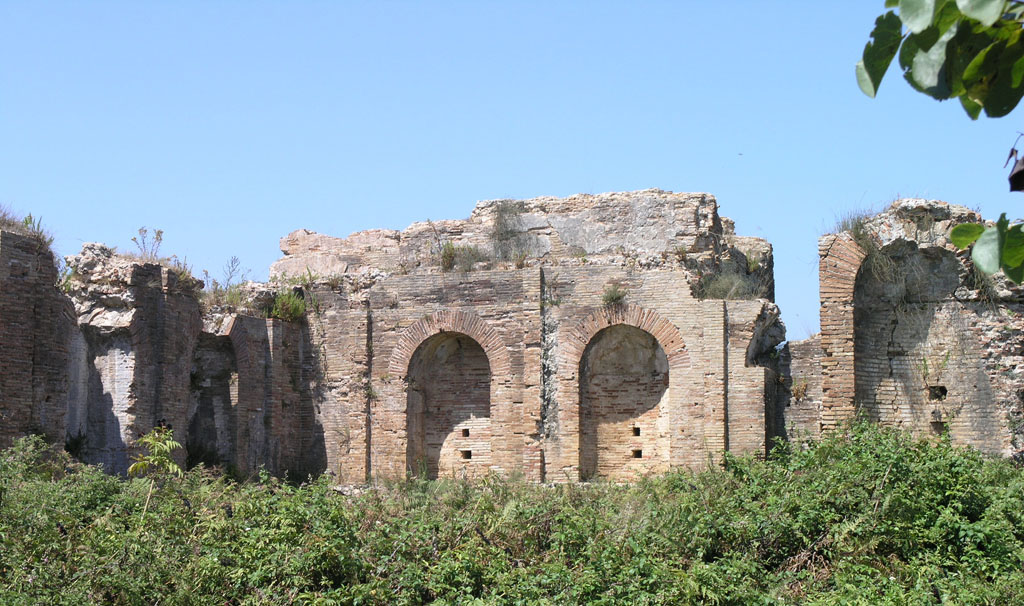
Roman nymphaeum, Nicopolis

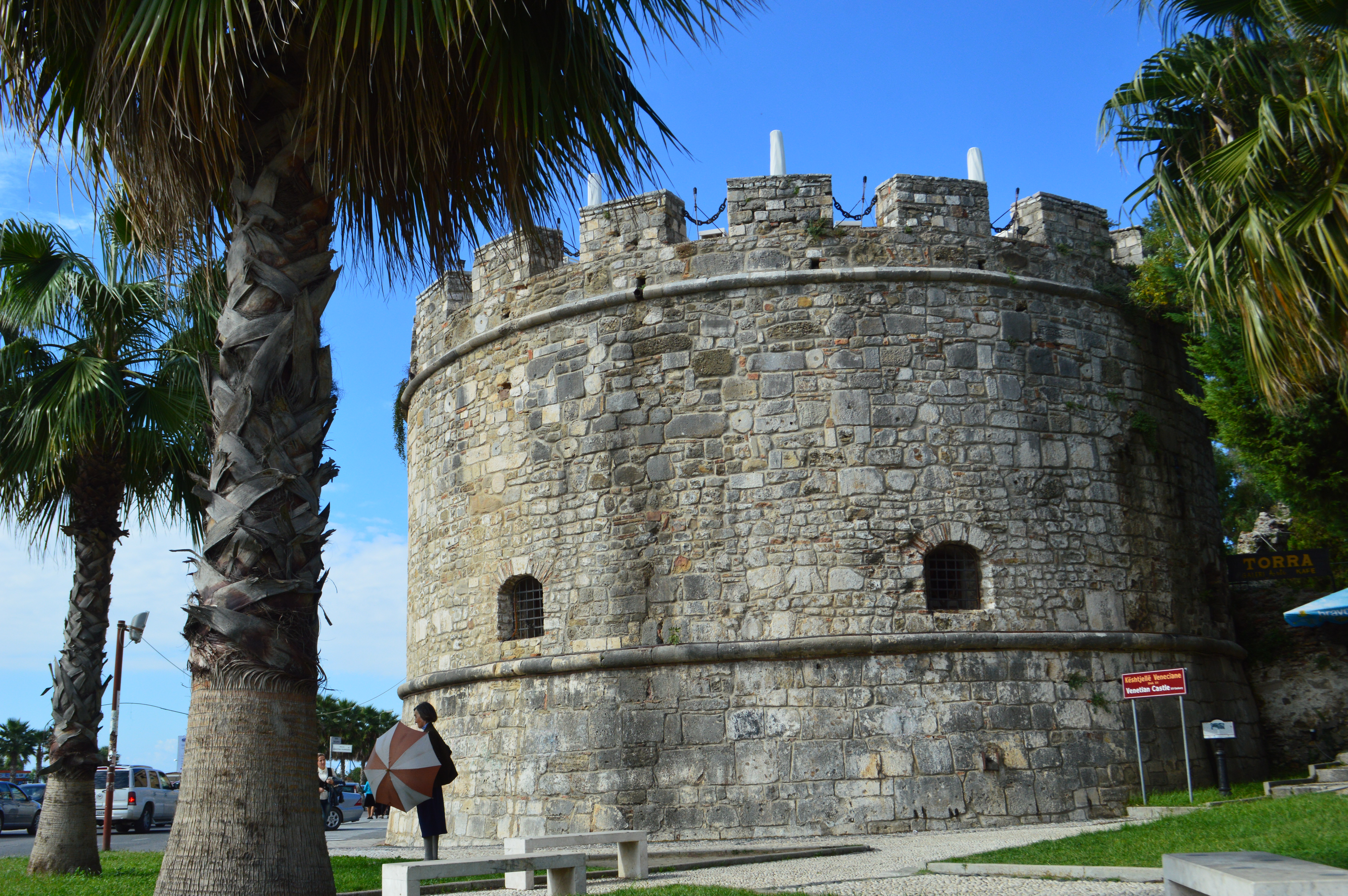
A bastion of Durrës Castle, built by Emperor Anastasius I Dicorus

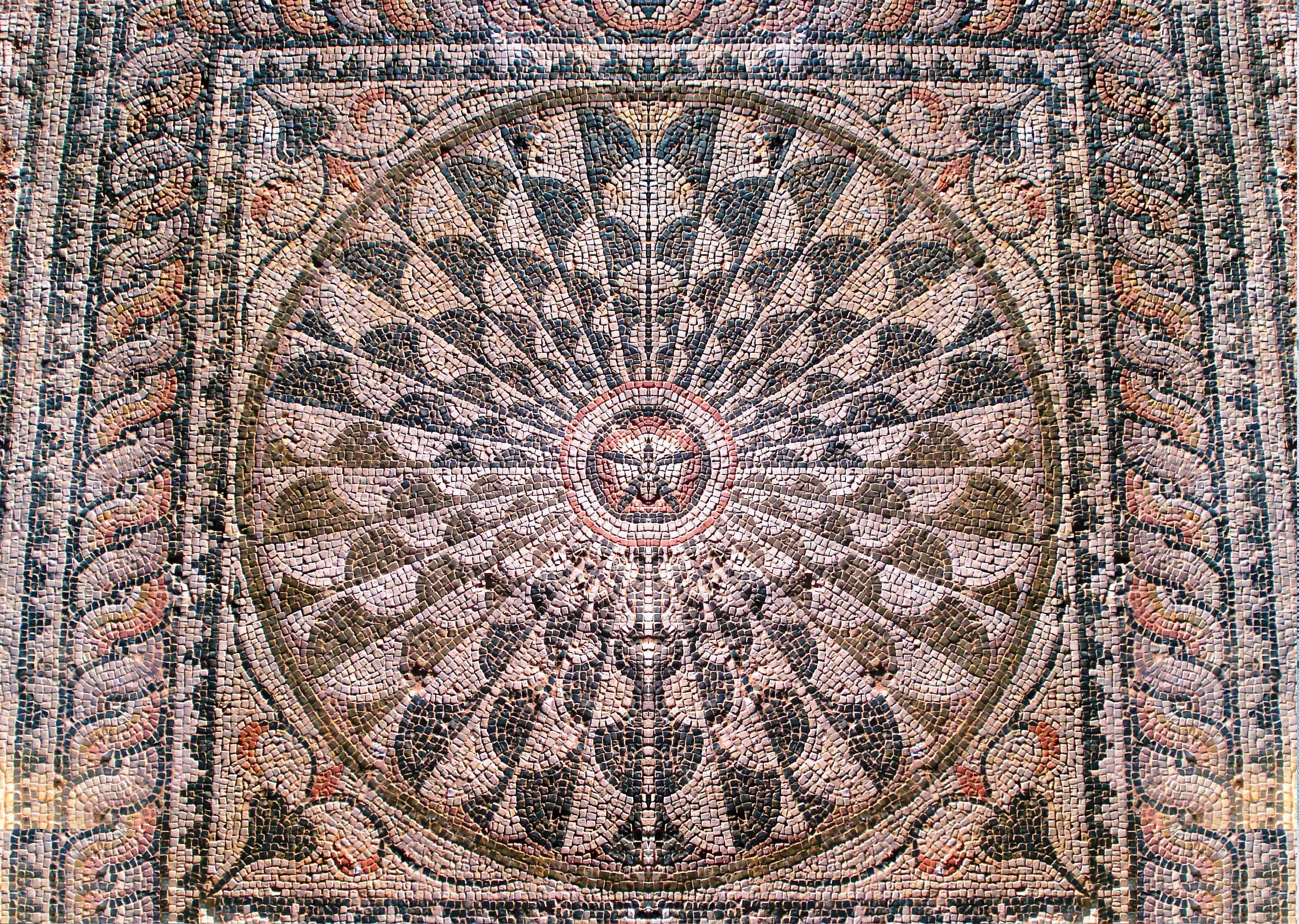
Mosaic from the Roman Villa of Manius Antoninus, Nicopolis

== Sources ==
- Soustal, Peter; Koder, Johannes (1981). Tabula Imperii Byzantini, Band 3: Nikopolis und Kephallēnia (in German). Vienna: Verlag der Österreichischen Akademie der Wissenschaften. ISBN 978-3-7001-0399-8.
- Eberle, Lisa Pilar; le Quéré, Enora (2017). "Landed Traders, Trading Agriculturalists? Land in the Economy of the Italian Diaspora in the Greek East". Journal of Roman Studies: 107, 27–59. JSTOR 26576044.
- Walker, Susan; Wilkes, John (2010). "Becoming Roman and staying Greek in the Southern Adriatic". Bulletin of the Institute of Classical Studies: 197–212. JSTOR 44214907.
- Kazhdan, Alexander, ed. (1991). The Oxford Dictionary of Byzantium. Oxford and New York: Oxford University Press. ISBN 0-19-504652-8.
- Nesbitt, John; Oikonomides, Nicolas, eds. (1991). Catalogue of Byzantine Seals at Dumbarton Oaks and in the Fogg Museum of Art, Volume 1: Italy, North of the Balkans, North of the Black Sea. Vol. 1. Washington, DC: Dumbarton Oaks Research Library and Collection. ISBN 0-88402-194-7.
- Pertusi, A. (1952). Constantino Porfirogenito: De Thematibus (in Italian). Rome: Biblioteca Apostolica Vaticana.
- Wolfram, Herwig (1988). History of the Goths. Berkeley and Los Angeles: University of California Press. ISBN 978-0-52006-983-1.
