= Donatus of Euroea =

4th-century Christian saint

Saint Donatus of Euroea
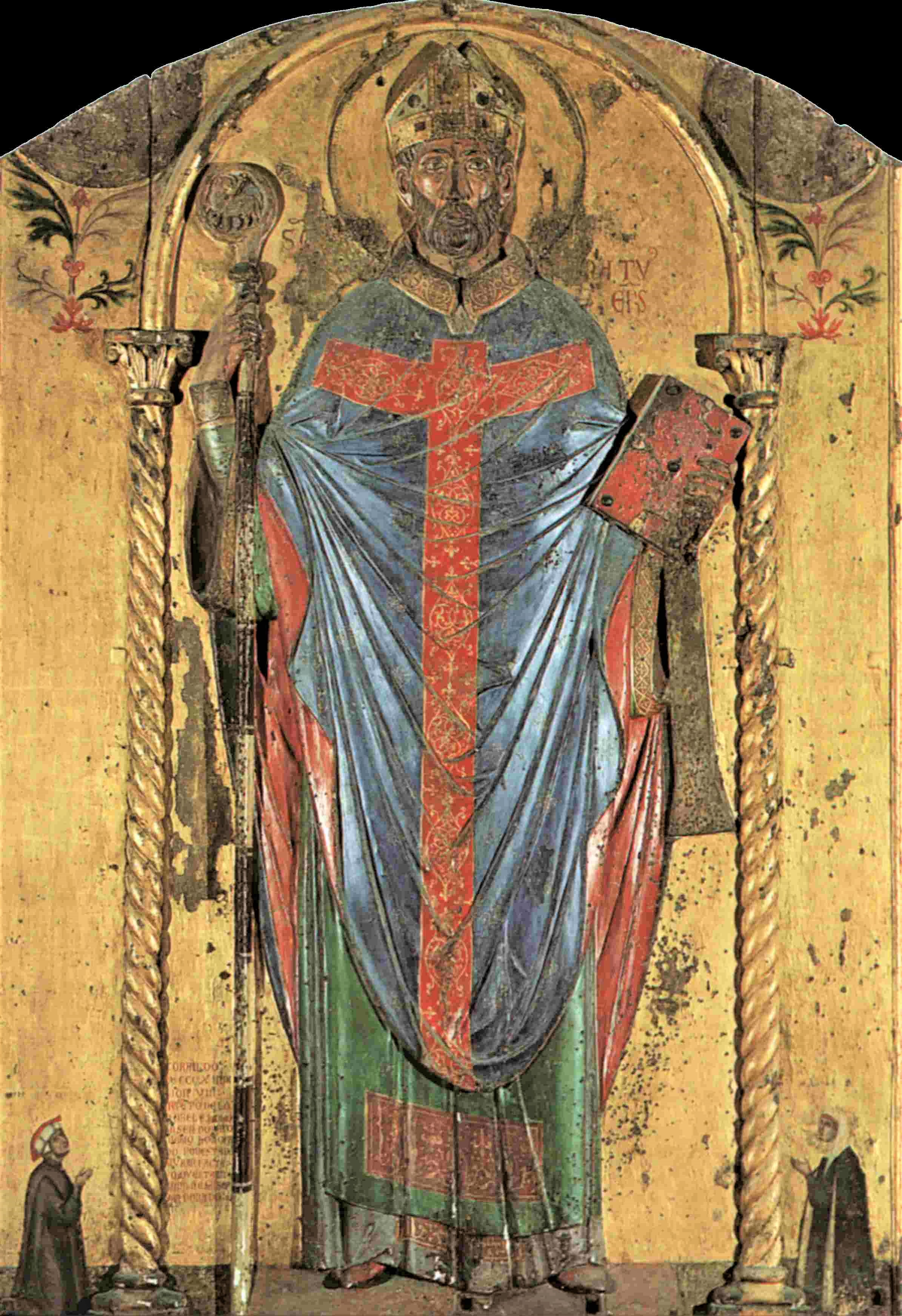
- Roman Catholic icon of Donatus

Bishop of Euroea
- Born: Euroea, Epirus Vetus, Roman Empire
- Died: 387 AD
- Venerated in: Eastern Orthodox Church; Roman Catholic Church
- Major shrine: Kassiopi in Corfu, modern Greece
- Feast: April 30

Saint Donatus of Euroea (Albanian: Shën Dhonati, Greek: Άγιος Δονάτος) was a Greek saint, who is revered in both by both Eastern Orthodox and Roman Catholics, mostly in Albania and Greece.

Donatus was born in Euroea, Epirus Vetus (northwestern Greece) and lived during the reign of the Emperor Theodosius I. According to the 5th-century historian Sozomen, Saint Donatus was Bishop of Euroea, identifiable with Glyki in Epirus, Greece. The saint is said to have accomplished several miracles, such as successfully fighting a dragon, purifying well waters, saving the emperors' daughter, and reviving the dead.

Donatus died in 387 and his remains were transferred to Kassiopi in Corfu in 602 in order to be saved from barbarian invasions. However this led to a problem of jurisdiction and custody for the holy relics, which was resolved by Pope Gregory I. Donatus's cult was widespread in the Middle Ages.

His feast day is April 30.

The relics of Saint Donatus were plundered by the Venetians under Doge Domenico Michele in 1125 or 1126 from the city of Cephalonia.

Umbriatico Cathedral in Calabria in the south of Italy is dedicated to him: the area was occupied by Epirote troops after the conquest of Nikephoros Phokas the Elder in the 9th century, who brought with them the cults of the saints familiar to them.

== See also ==
- Saint Therinus
