= Photice =

Coordinates: 39°28′44″N 20°29′56″E

Photice or Photike (Ancient Greek: Φωτική) was a city in Epirus in the Roman and Byzantine periods. In the late Middle Ages it was known as Hagios Donatos (Ἅγιος Δονᾶτος).

== History ==
The city was likely settled since Classical Antiquity, but is only known in later times. It appears in the 6th-century Synecdemus, and according to Procopius of Caesarea, it was restored by Justinian I (r. 527–565). Procopius says that it originally stood in a marshy situation, and that Justinian built a citadel upon a neighbouring height. That citadel was likely named after Saint Donatus; in the lists of Justinian's buildings provided by Procopius, there are two forts of that name in the province of Epirus Vetus.

The city is attested as a bishopric, a suffragan see of the Metropolis of Naupaktos, since the Council of Chalcedon in 451. Only a few of its bishops are known: John (at the Council of Chalcedon), Diadochus (signatory of a letter on the murder of Proterius of Alexandria to Emperor Leo I the Thracian), Hilarius (signatory of a letter to Pope Hormisdas), Manuel (at the time of Germanus II of Constantinople), Antony (in 1564), and Nicholas (c. 1720). From the 10th century, the see was moved to nearby Bela, probably for a short time at first; by the 13th century, the bishopric resided permanently at Bela. By that time, Photice itself was known as Hagios Donatos; the chastel de Saint Donnat was promised as his wife's dowry to Philip of Taranto by Nikephoros I Komnenos Doukas, Despot of Epirus.

In the revolt of Epirus in 1338/39 against the Byzantine emperor Andronikos III Palaiologos (r. 1328–1341), Hagios Donatos remained loyal to the emperor. In 1367 or 1368 the town, under its ruler Bardas, abandoned the allegiance to the Serbian ruler of Epirus, Thomas Preljubović, but in 1380 Thomas purchased its possession. In 1411 the town submitted to Carlo I Tocco, who later appointed his second son, Torno, as its governor. Paramythia, which eventually succeeded the settlement, is attested at about the same time. The Ottomans knew the town as "Aidonat Kalesi".

== Location and remains ==
Its site is located near the modern area of Limponi, some 2 km northwest of Paramythia. Remains of the fortifications on a rocky plateau, stretching in an east–west direction with sheer cliffs to the west, include walls up to 5 m high, remains of a gate with tower, and of a square keep. The wider area features a number of Byzantine monuments:

At the site of Balsamari, remains of a three-aisled Byzantine basilica, probably dating to the 11th century, dedicated to Saint Photeine. Its dimensions are 13.7 m × 12.3 m, and its walls survived in places up to 2.5 m in height. West of Balsamari, at Palioklisi, remains of an early Christian basilica on a hilltop. Probably three-aisled, some 20 m × 14 m large, with walls up to 2 m high, in the apse up to 4.5 m. West of Plioklisi is the Panagia Lampobithra (or Lampovitsa), a ruined small, one-aisled church, some 7 m × 5 m large.

In Paramythia itself lies the Church of the Dormition or Great Church (Μεγάλη Εκκλησία), a late Byzantine three-aisled basilica. Some 100 m to the north are remains of a Byzantine bath-house. Some 3 km south of Paramythia, near the village of Chrysavgi, remains of a three-aisled basilica (6th/7th century).

== Catholic titular see ==
A titular see of Photice (Italian: Fotice) was established by the Roman Catholic Church in 1933. It has had two incumbents, and has been vacant since 1978:

- Joaquim de Lange, C.S.Sp. (1952.04.18 – 1978.05.26)
- Joseph-Wilfrid Guy, O.M.I. (1929.12.19 – 1937.06.02, 1942.11.07 – 1951.12.08)
