= Metropolis of Nafpaktos and Agios Vlasios =

Metropolis of Nafpaktos and Agios Vlasios Ιερά Μητρόπολις Ναυπάκτου και Αγίου Βλασίου

Location
- Country: Greece
- Ecclesiastical province: Nafpaktia
- Archdeaconries: 3: Nafpaktos; Agios Vlasios; Platanos
- Headquarters: Nafpaktos

Information
- Formation: 4th century
- Cathedral: Saint Demetrius Metropolitan Cathedral, Nafpaktos

Current leadership
- Bishop: Hierotheos Vlachos

Website
- https://www.parembasis.gr/

The Metropolis of Nafpaktos and Agios Vlasios (Greek: Ιερά Μητρόπολις Ναυπάκτου και Αγίου Βλασίου) is a metropolitan see of the Church of Greece. Its seat is the town of Nafpaktos (Naupaktos or Naupactus, in the late Middle Ages known as Lepanto) in southeastern Aetolia-Acarnania, and occupies the municipality of Nafpaktia and the municipal unit of Parakampylia of the Agrinio municipality. The current metropolitan (since 1995) is Hierotheos (Vlachos).

== History ==
The see of Nafpaktos is attested since the 4th century, and was initially a suffragan of Corinth and later of Athens.

Like the rest of Illyricum, Nafpaktos depended on the pope of Rome until 733, when Leo III the Isaurian annexed it to the Patriarchate of Constantinople. Its bishop, Anthony, is attested among the participants of the councils held at Constantinople in 869–70 and 879–80.

When Nafpaktos became the seat of the new Byzantine thema of Nicopolis in the second half of the 9th century, the bishopric was elevated to a metropolitan see in the late 9th century, assuming the role which Nicopolis had formerly held.

It is thus that the see appears in the sources from the 9th century on as "Nafpaktos of Nicopolis" (μητρόπολις Ναυπάκτου Νικοπόλεως), counting initially eight suffragans covering all of Epirus: Vonditsa, Aetos, Acheloos, Rogoi, Ioannina, Photike, Hadrianopolis, Buthrotum. In the Escorial Taktikon of the early 970s, the bishopric of Chimara has been added, and during the 11th century, two further sees, Kozyli and Arta were established under Nafpaktos. Following the Byzantine conquest of Bulgaria ca. 1020, the northern suffragan dioceses came under the jurisdiction of the Archbishopric of Ohrid.

In 1025, the metropolitan was at the head of a rebellion of the local populace, which led to the death of the local strategos George. Emperor Constantine VIII (r. 1025–28) brutally suppressed the uprising, and blinded the metropolitan.

After the Fourth Crusade, Nafpaktos became part of the Despotate of Epirus. Under its metropolitan, John Apokaukos, the see of Nafpaktos gained in importance and headed the local synod for the southern half of the Epirote domains, but was soon overshadowed by the Archbishopric of Ohrid under the energetic Demetrios Chomatenos.

The town came under Frankish rule from 1294, and became a Roman Catholic see, of which there were about 20 archbishops in the 14th–15th centuries. The city remained a titular see of the Roman Catholic Church until 1977.

== Sources ==
- Fine, John V. A. Jr. (1994) [1987]. The Late Medieval Balkans: A Critical Survey from the Late Twelfth Century to the Ottoman Conquest. Ann Arbor, Michigan: University of Michigan Press. ISBN 0-472-08260-4.
- Gregory, T. E. (1991). "Naupaktos". In Kazhdan, Alexander (ed.). The Oxford Dictionary of Byzantium. Oxford and New York: Oxford University Press. pp. 1442–1443. ISBN 0-19-504652-8.
- Nesbitt, John; Oikonomides, Nicolas, eds. (1994). Catalogue of Byzantine Seals at Dumbarton Oaks and in the Fogg Museum of Art, Volume 2: South of the Balkans, the Islands, South of Asia Minor. Washington, DC: Dumbarton Oaks Research Library and Collection. ISBN 0-88402-226-9.
- Veikou, Myrto (2012). Byzantine Epirus: A Topography of Transformation. Settlements of the Seventh-Twelfth Centuries in Southern Epirus and Aetoloacarnania, Greece. BRILL. ISBN 978-9004221512.
