= Alexandroupolis =

City in northeastern Greece

Alexandroupolis Ἀλεξανδρούπολις Αλεξανδρούπολη
- Municipality
- The lighthouse at the promenade, a symbol of Alexandroupolis

- Location within Greece
- Coordinates: 40°51′N 25°52′E
- Country: Greece
- Geographic region: Thrace
- Administrative region: Eastern Macedonia and Thrace
- Regional unit: Evros

Government
  - Mayor: Ioannis Zampoukis (since 2019)

Area
  - Municipality: 1,217.0 km^{2} (469.9 sq mi)
  - Municipal unit: 642.2 km^{2} (248.0 sq mi)
- Highest elevation: 11 m (36 ft)
- Lowest elevation: 0 m (0 ft)

Population (2021)
  - Municipality: 71,751
  - Density: 58.957/km^{2} (152.70/sq mi)
  - Municipal unit: 62,936
  - Municipal unit density: 98.00/km^{2} (253.8/sq mi)
  - Community: 59,723
- Time zone: UTC+2 (EET)
  - Summer (DST): UTC+3 (EEST)
- Postal code: 681 00
- Area code: 25510
- Vehicle registration: ΕΒ
- Website: www.alexpolis.gr

Alexandroupolis (Ἀλεξανδρούπολις, IPA: [aleks̠anˈðɾupolis̠]) or Alexandroupoli (Αλεξανδρούπολη, IPA: [aleks̠anˈðɾupoli]), is a port city in Greece and the capital of the Evros regional unit, in Greek Thrace. It is the largest city in Eastern Macedonia and Thrace, with a population of 71,751 and is an important port and commercial center for Northern Greece.

The city was first settled by the Ottoman Empire in the 19th century and grew into the fishing village Dedeağaç. In 1873, it became a kaza and one year later was promoted to a sanjak. The city developed into a regional trading center. Later, it became a part of Adrianople Vilayet. During the Russo-Turkish War (1877–1878), the area was briefly captured by the Russians. Ottoman rule ended with the First Balkan War, when the city was captured by Bulgaria in 1912. In the Second Balkan War, Greece took control of the city. With the Treaty of Bucharest (10 August 1913), the city returned to Bulgaria.

With the defeat of Bulgaria in World War I, the city came under Greek control for the second time. In 1920, the city was renamed to honour the King of Greece, Alexander. With the Treaty of Lausanne in 1923, Alexandroupolis became an official part of Greece.

Alexandroupolis benefits from its position at the centre of land and sea routes connecting Greece with Turkey. Landmarks in Alexandroupolis include the lighthouse in the port, the archaeological sites of the Mesimvria Zone, the city's waterfront (the centre of commercial activity), the Ethnological Museum of Thrace, the thermal springs (Hana) of Traianoupoli, the cave of the Cyclops Polyphemus and the nearby Evros delta.

Alexandroupolis has developed into a strategic port for both Greece and NATO in 2022, complementing the port of Souda in southern Greece.

== Name ==
The modern city of Alexandroupolis was founded as a small fishing village in the early 19th century under the Ottoman Empire, by fishermen from Ainos and the villages of Makri and Maroneia. It became known as Dedeagach (Greek: Δεδεαγάτς; Turkish: Dedeağaç [deˈdeaatʃ]; Bulgarian: Дедеагач [dɛdɛaɡat͡ʃ]). The name supposedly comes from an old Turkish wise man (Turkish dede) who spent much of his time under the shade of a tree (ağaç) and was eventually buried beside it. From the first days of the city's capture (14 May 1920), the local authorities as well as the Metropolitan, decided to rename the city from Dedeağaç to Neapoli ("new city"), as it was the newest Greek city. In 1920, King Alexander I of Greece visited the city, and the local authorities renamed the city Alexandroupolis ("city of Alexander") in his honor, with the approval of the central government.

== History ==
=== From Neolithic Period to the 19th century ===
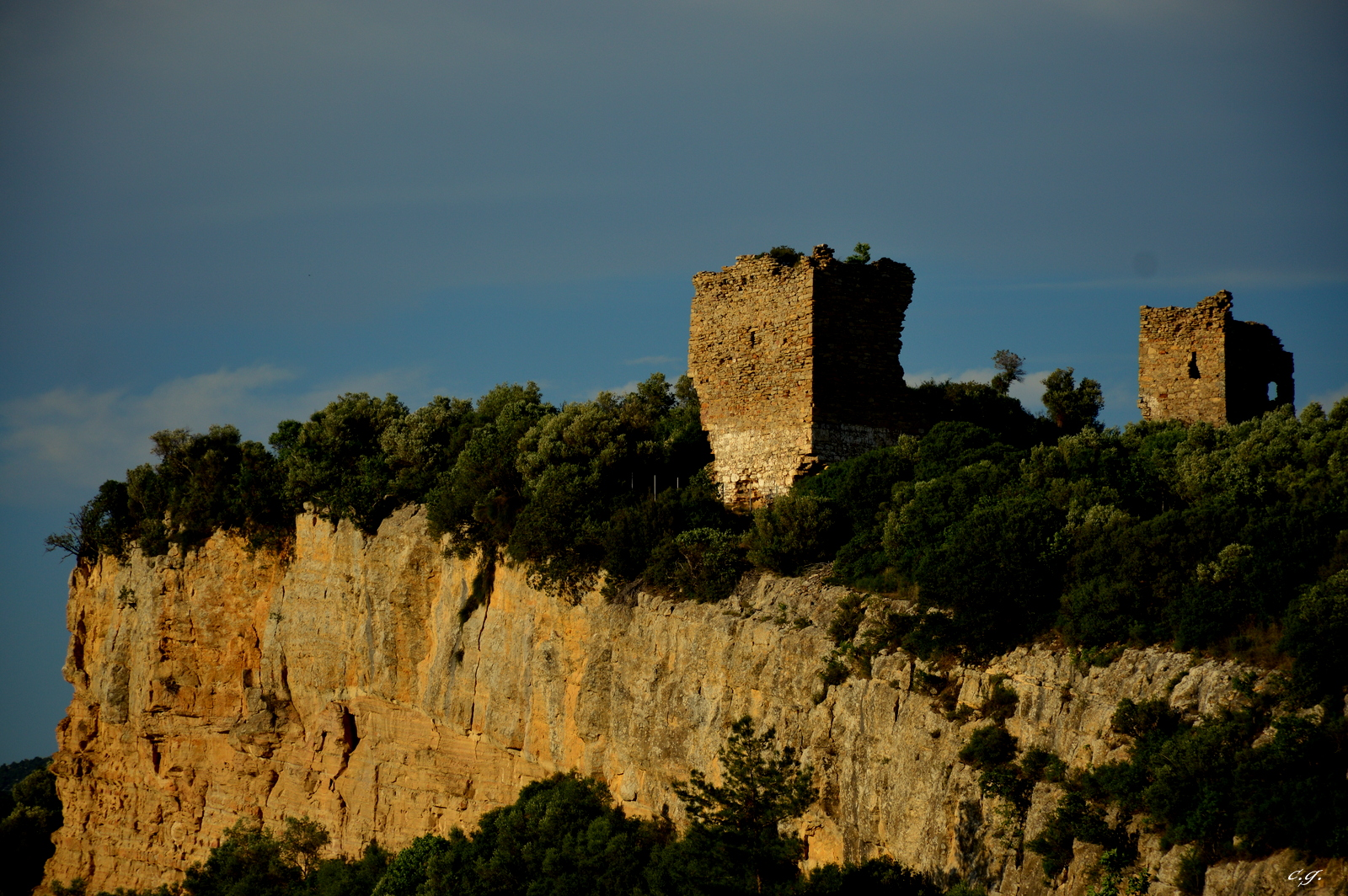
Ruins of the Byzantine Avandas castle (Avas) outside the city.

Human settlements appear since the Neolithic Period (4500-3000 BC) at the southeast end of Western Thrace. In the Bronze Age (3000-1050 BC) there is no strong evidence of active city participation. During the Early Iron Age (1050-650 BC) the various Thracian tribes appeared and settled in mountainous and, more rarely, in lowland areas.

The modern city is near the site of ancient Sale, a colony of Samothrace. Sale, was a member of the Delian League led by Athens. Alexandroupolis, as well as the whole area from the Evros Delta to Lake Vistonida and the foothills of Rhodope Mountains, was inhabited by Cicones, a Thracian people with whom, according to mythology, Odysseus and his comrades clashed on their return from Troy. The area became part of Macedon under Philip and his son Alexander the Great, passing to his successor in Thrace after his death, Lysimachus. During the Hellenistic age the area became part of the Seleucid, Ptolemaic, Antigonid empires, kingdom of Pergamum and finally the Roman Empire as part of the Roman province of Thrace and later Diocese of Thrace.

In the Byzantine Period, the region which covers the modern city of Alexandroupolis was part of the theme of Macedonia and played an important role, due to its proximity to Constantinople. For this reason the settlement was guarded by powerful military installations. Basil I "the Macedonian" (r. 867–886) hailed from the theme of Macedonia in Thrace, and the Macedonian dynasty he founded was named after the theme of Macedonia.

In the following years, up to the 19th century, the city seems to have been deserted and covered by forests and wild trees.

=== Ottoman era ===
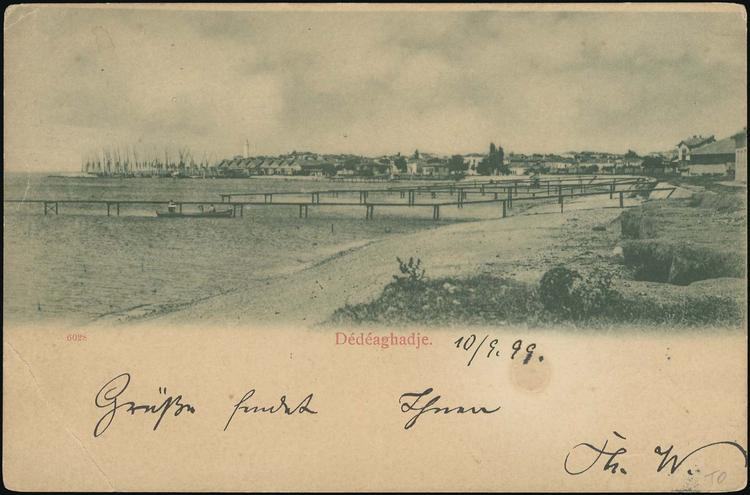
A French postcard of Dédéaghadje, 1899

The modern city was first settled in the 19th century, under the Ottoman Empire. Long used as a landing ground for fishermen from the opposite coast of Samothrace, a hamlet developed in the area during the construction of a railway line connecting Constantinople to the major cities of Macedonia from Pythio. The work was part of an effort to modernise the Empire, and was assigned to engineers from Austria-Hungary. The settlement grew into a fishing village, Dedeağaç.

In 1873 it was made the chief town of a kaza, to which it gave its name, and a kaymakam was appointed to it. In 1884 it was promoted to a sanjak, and the governor became a mutasarrıf. In 1889 the Greek archbishopric of Aenus was transferred to Dedeağaç. In the late 19th and early 20th century, Dedeağaç was part of the Adrianople Vilayet.

=== Russo-Turkish War ===
Dedeağaç was captured by the Russians during the Russo-Turkish War (1877–1878). Russian forces settled in the village. The officers in charge saw that reconstruction incorporated wide streets running parallel to each other, allowing the quick advance of troops, and avoided cul-de-sacs. This was very unlike the narrow alleys, cobbled streets, and dead-ends that were characteristic of Ottoman cities at the time. The city returned to Ottoman control by the end of the war. The brief Russian presence had a lasting effect on the design of Alexandroupolis' streets.

=== Balkan Wars ===
The building of a railway station in Dedeağaç led to the development of the village into a town, and a minor trade centre by the end of the century. The town became the seat of a pasha as the capital of a sanjak. Ottoman control of the town lasted until the Balkan Wars. On 8 November 1912, Dedeağaç and its station was captured by Bulgarian forces with the assistance of the Hellenic Navy. Bulgaria and Greece were allies during the First Balkan War, but opponents in the Second Balkan War. Dedeağaç was captured by Greek forces on 11 July 1913. The Treaty of Bucharest (10 August 1913) determined that Dedeağaç would be returned to Bulgaria along with the rest of Western Thrace.

In September 1913, after the end of the Second Balkan War, about 12,000 Bulgarian refugees took refuge in the outskirts of the city. They were from 17 different villages all over the Western Thrace fleeing ethnic cleansing.

=== World War I ===
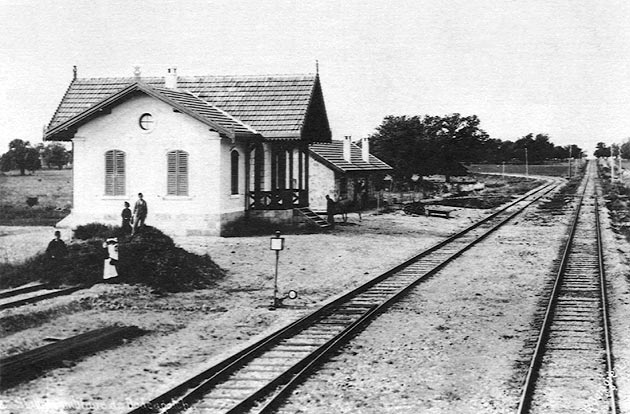
The old military railway station (Gare Militaire) of Alexandroupoli, 1893

The defeat of Bulgaria by the Allies in World War I (1914–1918) ensured another change of hands for the town. Western Thrace was withdrawn from Bulgaria under the terms of the 1919 Treaty of Neuilly. Alexandroupolis was under temporary management of the Entente led by French General Charpy. In the second half of April 1920 prime ministers of the main allies of the Entente powers (except United States), gave Western Thrace to Greece at the San Remo conference. Bulgaria retained the right of transit to use the port of Dedeagach to transport goods through the Aegean Sea.

The change of guard between French and Greek officials occurred on 14 May 1920, in the city's post office. In the interior of the post office, there is a memorial plaque concerning this event. The city was soon visited by Alexander of Greece. He was the first King of Greece to visit the town which was renamed in his honour.

=== Greco-Turkish War ===
Following the defeat of Greece in the Greco-Turkish War (1919–1922), the Greek Army under General Theodoros Pangalos retreated from Eastern Thrace to the area of Alexandroupolis. Bulgaria used the opportunity of the Greek defeat to demand that Alexandroupolis either be returned to Bulgarian control or declared a neutral zone under international control. Both demands were rejected by the Greek leadership and found no support in the League of Nations. The Treaty of Lausanne (24 July 1923) affirmed the Greek sovereignty of Western Thrace.

=== World War II ===
During World War II the Nazis gave Alexandroupolis to their Bulgarian partners. Alexandroupolis was under Bulgarian administration between May 1941 and 1944. Before the war the city had a Jewish community of 150 members. In March 1943 the Jews were deported to the Nazi death camps, where they were exterminated. Only 4 Jews survived. The city suffered some damage to buildings and a loss of population during the war.

Alexandroupolis was largely spared the effects of the Greek Civil War (1946–1949). Forces of the communist Democratic Army of Greece in and around the town area were small and loosely organized, resulting in the absence of major battles in the area. The return of peace allowed for Alexandroupolis to grow from a town of 16,332 residents in 1951 to a city of 57,812 residents by 2011.

=== Changes in local governance ===
Since 1930, Alexandroupolis has been in the Evros regional unit in the administrative region of Eastern Macedonia and Thrace, in the historical region of Western Thrace. In 2006, the province of Alexandroupolis was abolished. In 2011, the municipality of Alexandroupolis was created by the merger of three former municipalities of Alexandroupolis, Feres and Traianoupoli. The municipality currently has an area of 1,216.954 km^{2}, and is divided into the communities of Aisymi, Avas, Kirki, Makri and Sykorrachi. As of May 2019, the mayor of Alexandroupolis is Ioannis Zampoukis.

== Geography ==
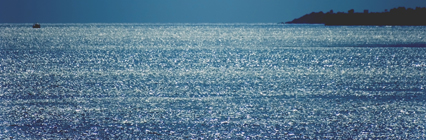
The Thracian Sea.

Alexandroupolis is about 14.5 km (9.0 mi) west of the delta of the Evros, 40 km from the border with Turkey, 346 km (215 mi) from Thessaloniki on the newly constructed A2 Egnatia Odos motorway, and 750 km (470 mi) from Athens. Around the city are small fishing villages like Makri and Dikella to the west, and suburban Maistros, Apalos, Antheia, Aristino, Nipsa, Loutra to the east, while north of the city are the Palagia, Avantas, Aissymi, and Kirki. At the 2001 census, the main city had a population of 48,885 and the municipal unit had a population of 52,720. The current metropolitan population is estimated at 70,000 inhabitants, and its area covers the southern portion of the regional unit, running from the Rhodope regional unit to the Evros Delta. Besides Alexandroupolis, its other largest settlements are the villages of Mákri (pop. 820), Ávas (497), Sykorráchi (309), Aisými (289), and Díkella (288).

=== Climate ===
Alexandroupolis has a hot-summer Mediterranean climate (Csa) with hot, dry summers and cool, wet winters. The lowest temperature ever recorded is −14.0 °C (6.8 °F) on 15 February 1985 while the highest temperature ever recorded is 41.4 °C (106.5 °F) on 18 July 2024.

Climate data for Alexandroupolis (1951-2010, extremes 1961-present)
Month	Jan	Feb	Mar	Apr	May	Jun	Jul	Aug	Sep	Oct	Nov	Dec	Year
Record high °C (°F)	17.8 (64.0)	21.4 (70.5)	23.4 (74.1)	30.6 (87.1)	33.4 (92.1)	38.0 (100.4)	41.4 (106.5)	39.8 (103.6)	36.8 (98.2)	32.6 (90.7)	26.4 (79.5)	23.2 (73.8)	41.4 (106.5)
Mean daily maximum °C (°F)	8.6 (47.5)	9.8 (49.6)	12.3 (54.1)	17.3 (63.1)	22.6 (72.7)	27.4 (81.3)	30.5 (86.9)	30.7 (87.3)	26.2 (79.2)	20.4 (68.7)	14.9 (58.8)	10.6 (51.1)	19.3 (66.7)
Daily mean °C (°F)	5.1 (41.2)	6.0 (42.8)	8.5 (47.3)	13.3 (55.9)	18.6 (65.5)	23.4 (74.1)	26.2 (79.2)	25.8 (78.4)	21.2 (70.2)	15.8 (60.4)	10.9 (51.6)	7.1 (44.8)	15.2 (59.3)
Mean daily minimum °C (°F)	1.4 (34.5)	1.8 (35.2)	3.7 (38.7)	7.2 (45.0)	11.5 (52.7)	15.5 (59.9)	18.0 (64.4)	18.0 (64.4)	14.4 (57.9)	10.5 (50.9)	6.7 (44.1)	3.3 (37.9)	10.1 (50.2)
Record low °C (°F)	−13.2 (8.2)	−14 (7)	−13.6 (7.5)	−2.4 (27.7)	1.0 (33.8)	7.0 (44.6)	9.0 (48.2)	8.4 (47.1)	0.0 (32.0)	−2 (28)	−6.2 (20.8)	−10.2 (13.6)	−14 (7)
Average precipitation mm (inches)	63.3 (2.49)	56.3 (2.22)	48.6 (1.91)	35.1 (1.38)	36.2 (1.43)	28.3 (1.11)	19.8 (0.78)	13.1 (0.52)	27.9 (1.10)	51.5 (2.03)	82.7 (3.26)	82.7 (3.26)	545.5 (21.49)
Average precipitation days	12.4	10.6	10.6	10.1	9.7	7.2	4.4	3.3	4.4	7.7	10.2	13.1	103.7
Average relative humidity (%)	76.6	74.5	72.8	70.3	67.5	59.9	53.4	53.7	60.2	68.7	76.1	77.6	67.6
Mean monthly sunshine hours	105.3	120.1	171.9	213.3	276.5	309.6	355.5	339.7	254.9	191.7	126.4	96.5	2,561.4
Source 1: NOAA extremes (1961-1990)
Source 2: HNMS averages, Info Climat (sun 1991-2020, extremes 1991-present)

== Transport ==
Alexandroupolis is accessible by air, rail, road and ferry. It has an international port, the A2 Egnatia Odos motorway, the airport "Dimokritos" and a railway connection with other cities. There are cycle lanes in the city centre.

=== Airport ===
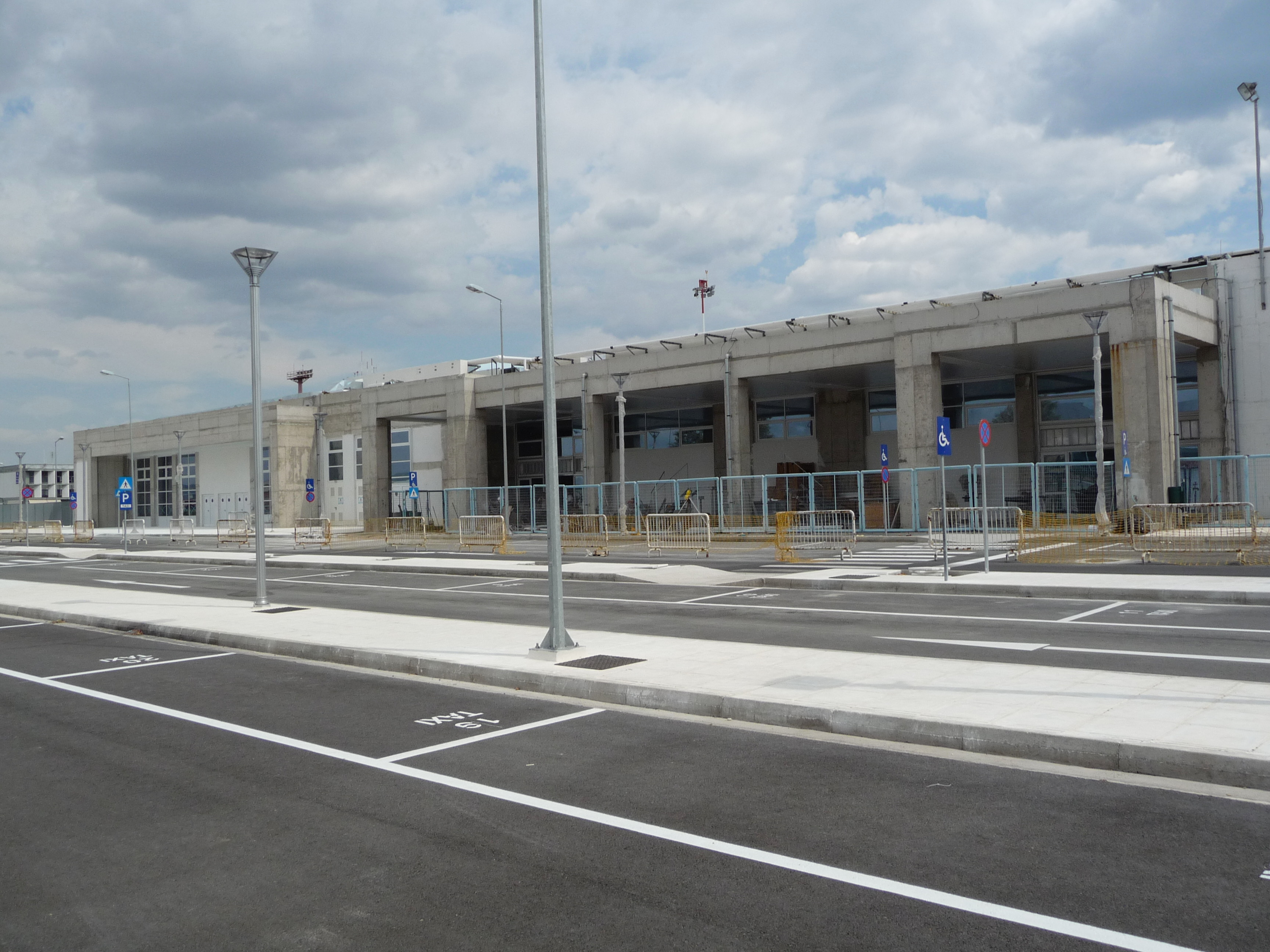
Dimokritos Airport

Alexandroupolis is served by Dimokritos International Airport (IATA:AXD) in the suburbs of Apalos, about 6 km from Alexandroupolis city center. There are daily flights to Athens, and several days per week flights to Crete (Heraklion and Sitia). The airport is connected to the city by highway, taxi services, and scheduled bus services.

=== Seaport ===
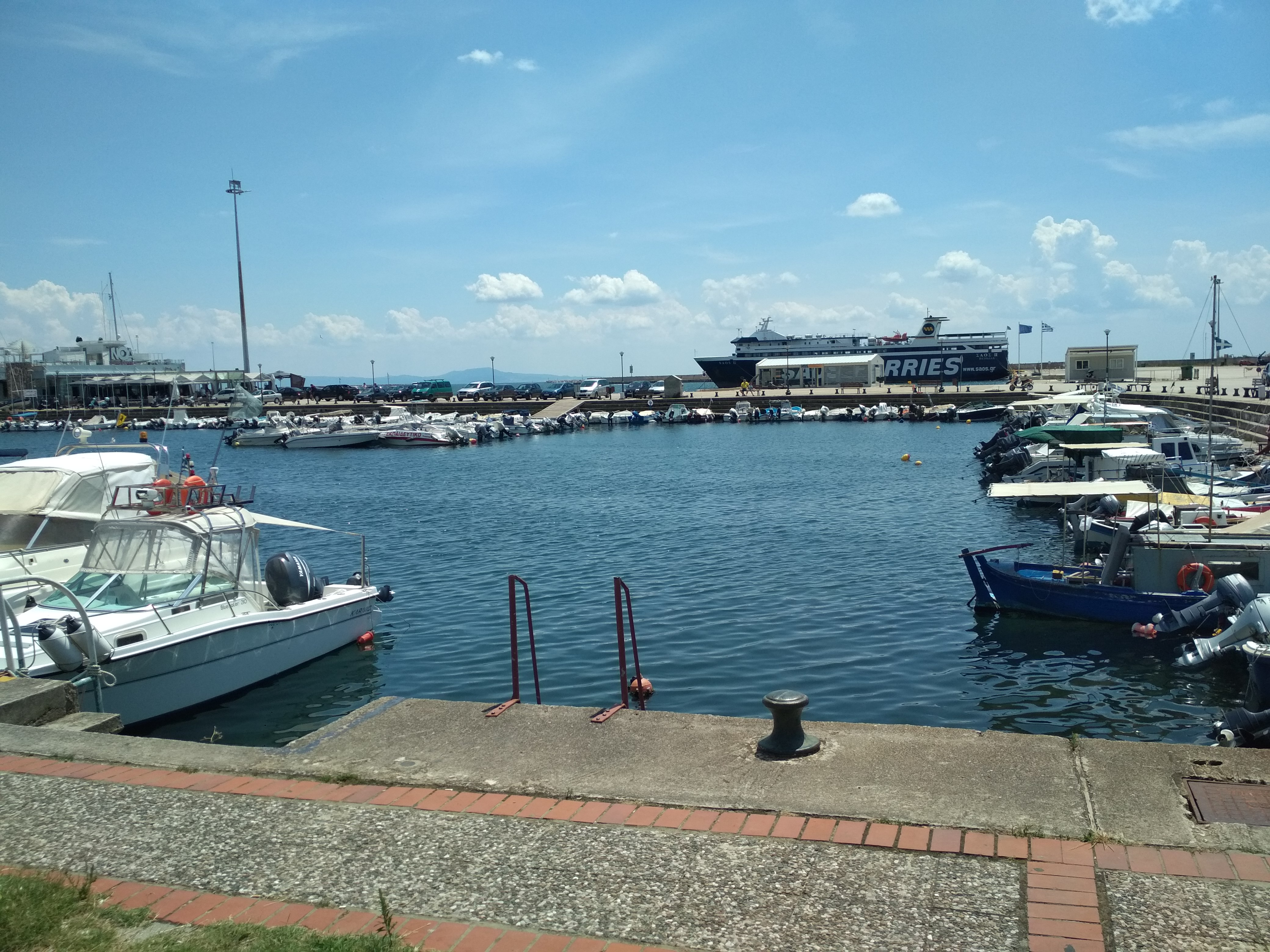
The port of Alexandroupolis

The port of Alexandroupolis has been used principally by travelers. There are daily services to the islands of Samothrace and Lemnos. Due to its strategic location on NATO's eastern flank, it has important military logistical significance.

=== Railway ===
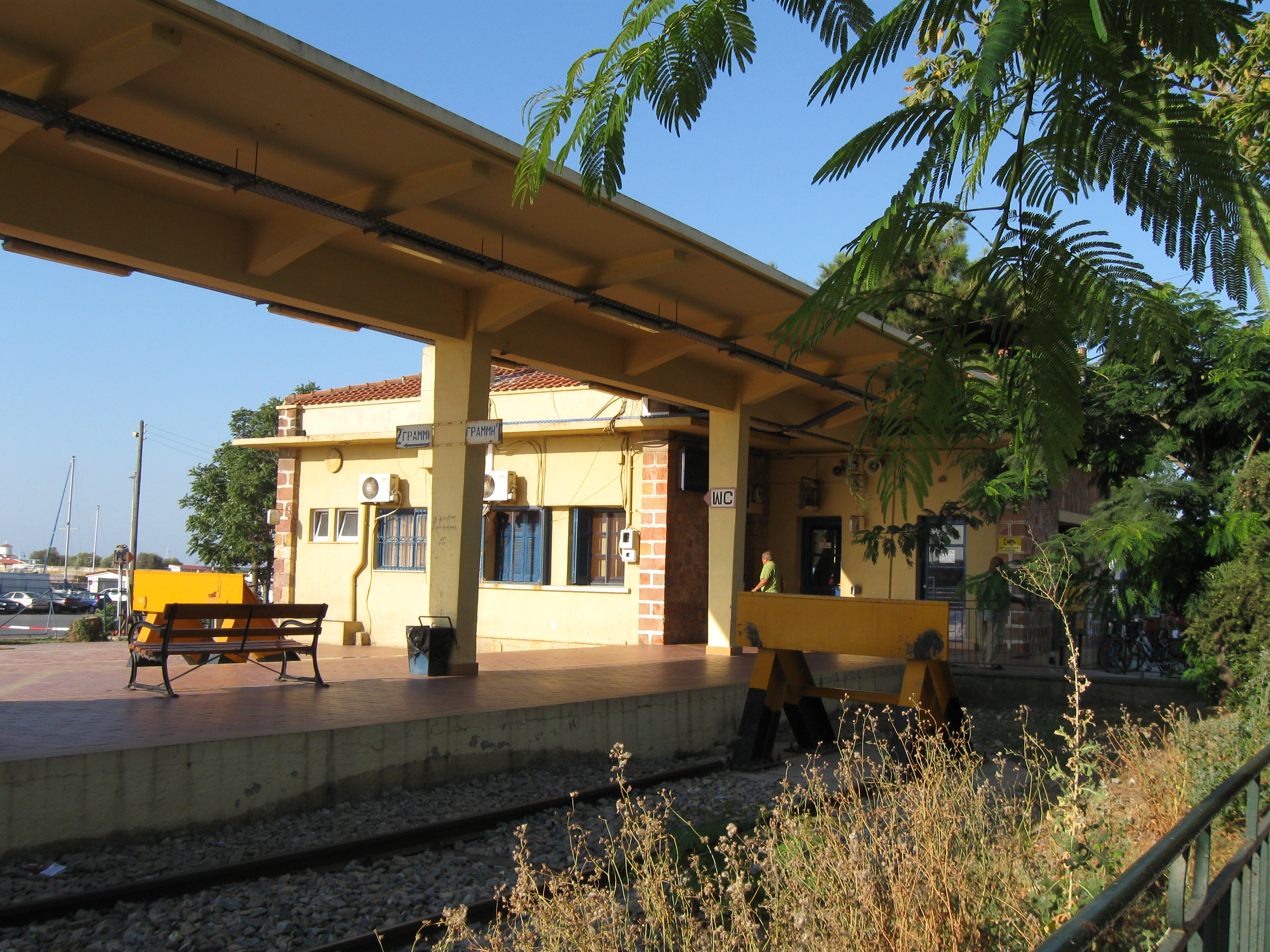
Alexandroupolis railway station

Alexandroupolis has two railway stations: Alexandroupolis dialogi (trading station) and Alexandroupoli or Alexandroupoli Port (for passengers). It is served by trains to Thessaloniki and to Ormenio. There is an extensive network of train and bus replacements services throughout the region of Evros. There were railway connections to Burgas in Bulgaria and to Edirne and Istanbul in Turkey, but those were suspended.

=== Road transport ===
The A2 Egnatia Odos motorway is the largest main road that passes through Alexandroupolis. It connects the city with Igoumenitsa, Ioannina, Kozani, Grevena, Veria, Thessaloniki, Kavala, Xanthi and Komotini to the west and Kipoi of Evros to the east. There are bus routes of the Evros Bus Service connecting Alexandroupolis with the cities of Komotini, Xanthi, Kavala and Thessaloniki. There are bus routes that connect Alexandroupolis directly with Athens. There is a frequent daily connection with the other regions of Evros (Feres, Soufli, Didymoteicho, Orestiada, etc.).

Alexandroupolis is the Southern terminus of the E85 north-south reference European Road, which crosses Bulgaria, Romania, Ukraine, Belarus and Lithuania, ending at the Baltic Sea port of Klaipėda.

=== Urban Transport ===
The Urban Bus Service of Alexandroupolis operates 15 routes. They connect the centre to the University, the hospital, the Airport and surrounding areas such as: Maistros, Makri (and Agia Paraskevi Beach), Palagia, Loutra, Nipsa, Mesembria, Avas, Amfitriti, Aisymi, Dikella and Apalos. Additional routes connect the centre with five districts: Poimenidi, Altinalmazi Park, Agios Vasileios, Exopolis and End of Avantos Street.

== Health ==
=== Alexandroupolis University General Hospital (PGNA) ===
The Hospital of Alexandroupolis was founded in 1939 under the name "Alexandroupolis State Hospital". The hospital was divided into two services, Medicine and Administration. The staff of the hospital at that time was 26 people, i.e. 13 administrative staff, 5 scientific and 8 nursing staff. In 1987 it was co-located with the Department of Medicine of the Democritus University of Thrace. In 2002, the merger of the University General Hospital of Alexandroupolis and the General Hospital of Alexandroupolis was completed in one unit under the name "University General Hospital of Alexandroupolis".

The following subsidiary organizations and services are under its jurisdiction: Medical Center of Soufli, Medical Center of Samothrace (including the Regional Clinics), Technological Education of First Cycle of Nursing (Nursing School). It operates in a building complex with a total area of 93,544 sq.m., within a plot of 200,000 sq.m., the largest hospital ever built in Greece, and covers the needs of the wider region of Eastern Macedonia and Thrace. The total capacity of the hospital is 673 beds.

=== Alexandroupolis Military Hospital (216 KICHNE) ===
In 1953, the operation of the 216th Mobile Campaign Surgical Hospital (KICHNE) began under the administration of Dr. Kampakis Vassilios at the Alexander the Great Camp. The mission of the hospital was to provide treatment to officers and hoplites of local units. In 1960 it stopped receiving patients, and became a recruited unit. In April 1962 it was transferred to the current Patsouka Camp, while it was receiving and treating pathology and surgical patients.

Since 1974 the hospital has been treating and examining patients of the 12th Mechanized Infantry Division "Evros". In 1996 it was renamed to the 492 General Military Hospital and has operated under this name until 2011. Since 2011 it has operated as 216 KICHNE.

== Media ==
=== Television ===
There are 3 regional television stations operating in Alexandroupolis: Delta TV, Thraki NET (Thrace Television Network), ALFA TV.

=== Press ===
Daily active newspapers

- Eleftheri Thraki (Free Thrace)
- I Gnomi tis Thrakis (The opinion of Thrace)

Weekly active newspapers

- Mahitis tou Evrou (Fighter of Evros)
- Politis tis Thrakis (Citizen of Thrace)
- Thraki Press (Thrace Press)

=== Radio ===
The main Radio Stations broadcasting from Alexandroupolis are:

- NRG
- Polis
- Status Radio
- Thraki Fm
- Heat Radio
- Delta Fm
- Kanali 5 (Channel 5)
- Radio Dee Jay
- Maximum
- Yparho
- Radio Elpida
- Radio Alfa

=== Sites ===
Local information in electronic form is done through the pages "e-evros", "Alexpolisonline", "evros24" and "evrosnews".

== Culture ==
Each year, in the summer on the coast avenue of King Alexander, a book exhibition is held. Every two years near the harbor the international trade fair "Alexpo" is organized.

On 14 May each year, the annexation of the city and Thrace to Greece is celebrated by a parade. The city's patron saint is Saint Nikolaos, whose feast is celebrated on 6 December each year.

=== Wine Festival ===
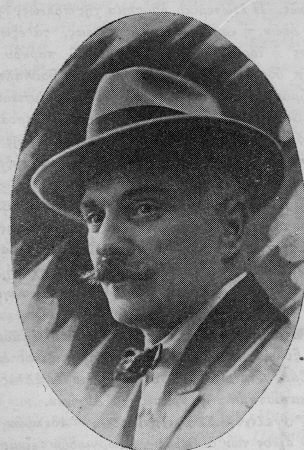
Konstantinos Altinalmazis, mayor (1925–1941)

Until the 1980s in the city, the Wine Festival was held under the auspices of the Greek National Tourism Organization (EOT). This celebration revived after 25 years, in the summer of 2013 at the initiative of the Municipality of Alexandroupolis and is the city's greatest cultural event. The city's and Evros's regional unit cultural associations offer red and white local wine along with various meats.

=== Nautical Week ===
In the summer of 2022, the Municipality of Alexandroupolis revived the "Nautical Week" after many years. This fest takes place in July and includes a number of events and activities, which aim to highlight the seamanship and the special relationship of Alexandroupolis and its people with the sea.

=== Ecopark "Altinalmazis" ===
Since May 2017, Alexandroupolis has a new 1400-seat garden theatre in "Ecopark Altinalmazis ", where various cultural events such as theatrical performances and concerts are held. It has an area of 135,597 sq.m. (80 acres) and has a refreshment, walkways, green spaces and kiosks. This park is named after Konstantinos Altinalmazis, Alexandroupolis's longest-serving mayor (1925–29, 1929–33, 1933–37,1937-41).

== Sights ==
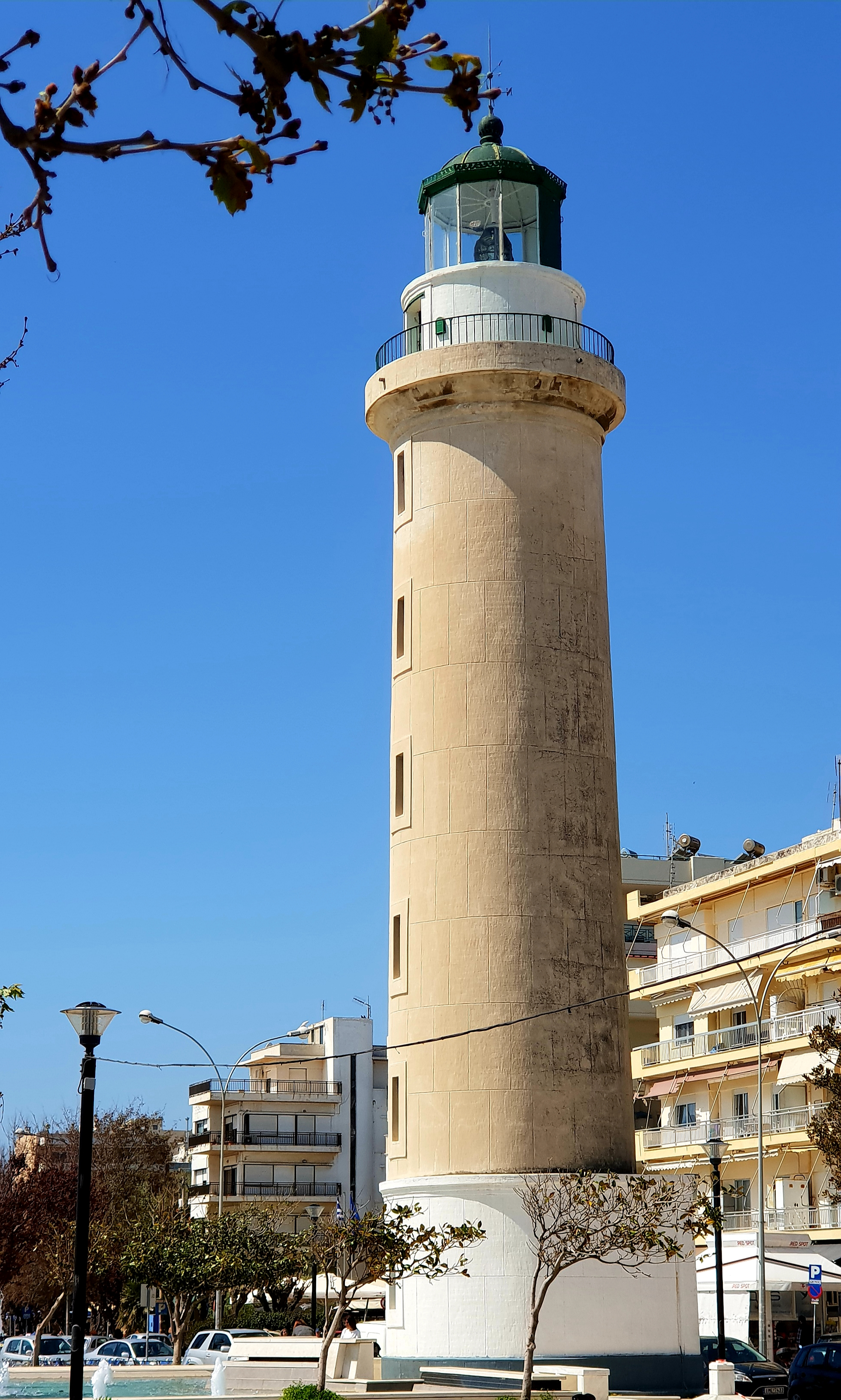
Alexandroupoli's lighthouse, symbol of the city

=== The Lighthouse of Alexandroupolis ===
A central attraction and symbol of the city is the Lighthouse (recognized as a cultural heritage monument in 2013) located on the city's promenade (Megalou Alexandrou Street). It was built in 1850 and started operating in 1880, built on the western side of the city's harbor to facilitate the coasting of local sailors who traveled to the area of Hellespont. It is on a cylindrical pedestal and is 27 meters from the average sea level and 18 meters from the ground, making it one of the tallest lighthouses in Greece. It operates with electricity and its distinctive feature is its light beam reaching 24 nautical miles (approximately 44 km) and three white blinks every 15 seconds.

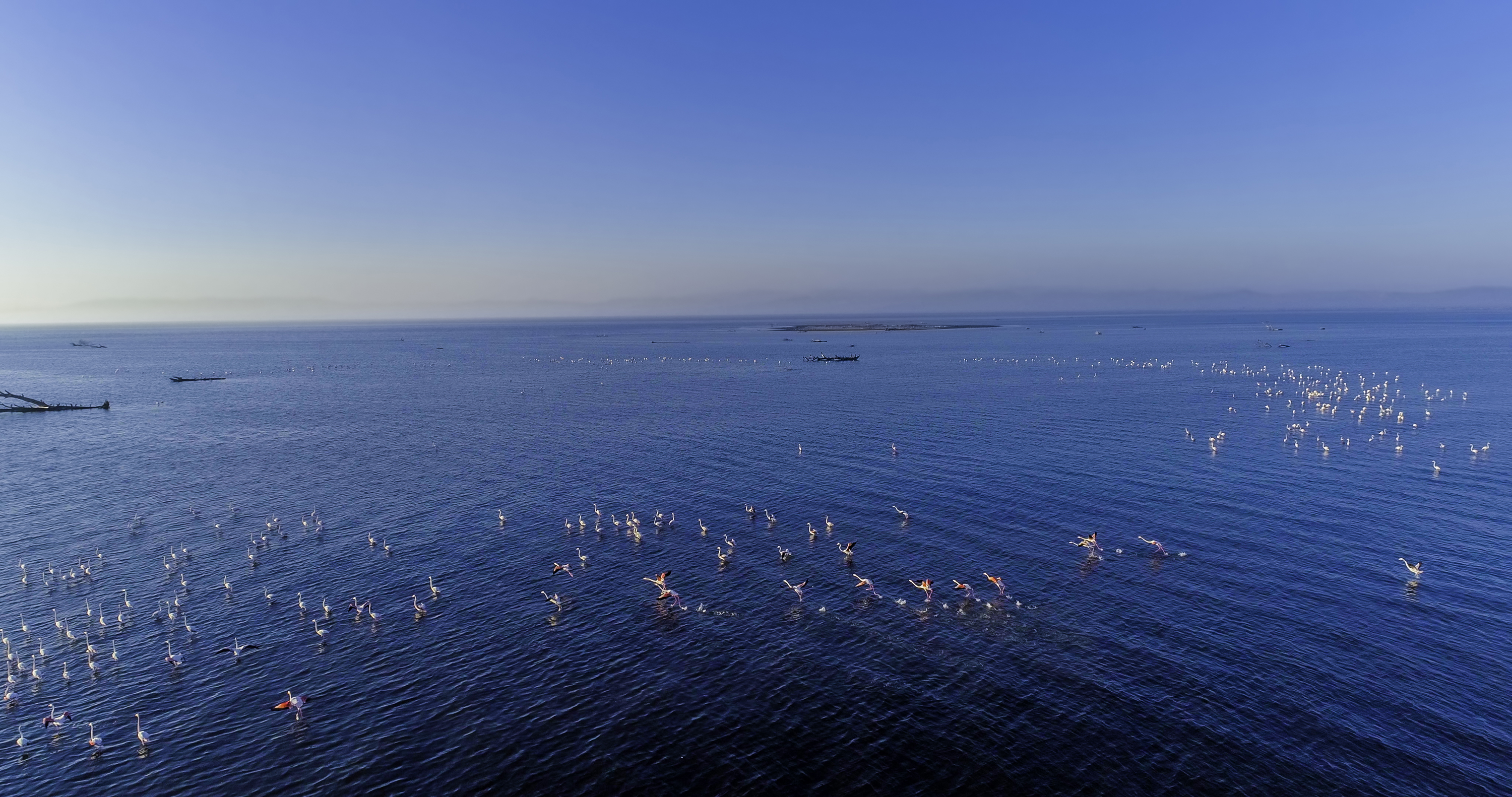
Delta of Evros

=== Evros Delta National Park ===
Just 20 miles from the city, the Evros Delta is one of Europe's most important habitats with 200,000-acre area, which is on the list of protected areas of the International Ramsar Convention (1971) due to the significant and rare species of plants (more than 300 species), fauna (40 species of mammals, 28 species of reptiles and 46 species of fish) and birds (320 species). Part of the Delta has been designated as a Special Protection Area and is proposed as a Site of Community Interest in the Natura 2000 Network.

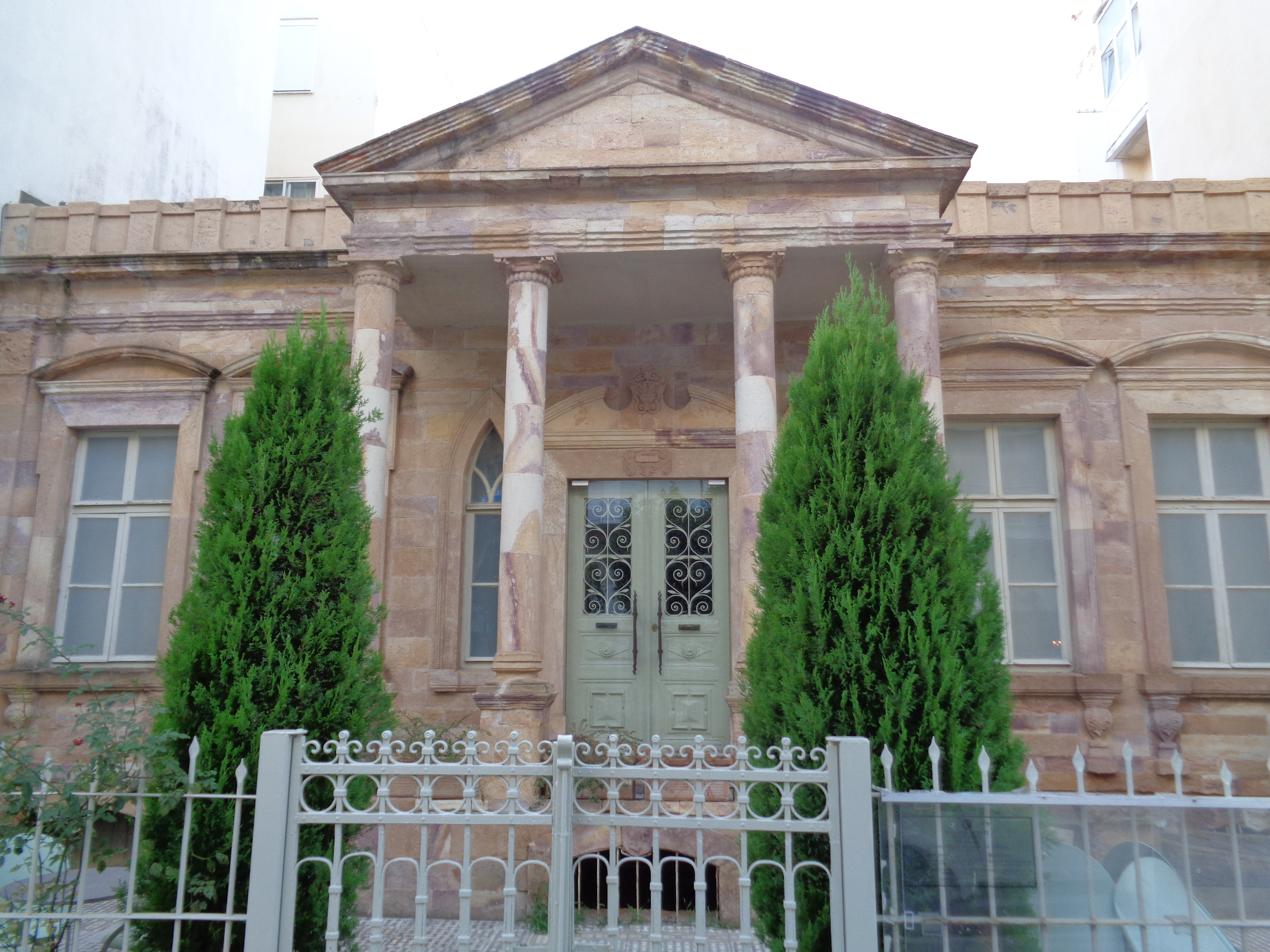
The building of the Ethnological Museum of Thrace in Alexandroupolis

=== Ethnological Museum of Thrace ===
It is housed in a 1899 built neoclassical stone building on 14 May, 63 street, and has been operating since October 2002 to preserve historical memory in the wider geographical area of Thrace. It includes exhibits on the tradition of Thrace and covers the following themes: clothing, music and worship, confectionery, bronze and earthenware, textiles, land cultivation.

=== Cave of Cyclops ===
It is located in Makri and is a famous cave of the Cyclops Polyphemus according to local folk tradition. It has traces of use since the Neolithic period (about 4,500 BC) and today the Neolithic settlement, one of the most important in the Balkans, has been discovered.

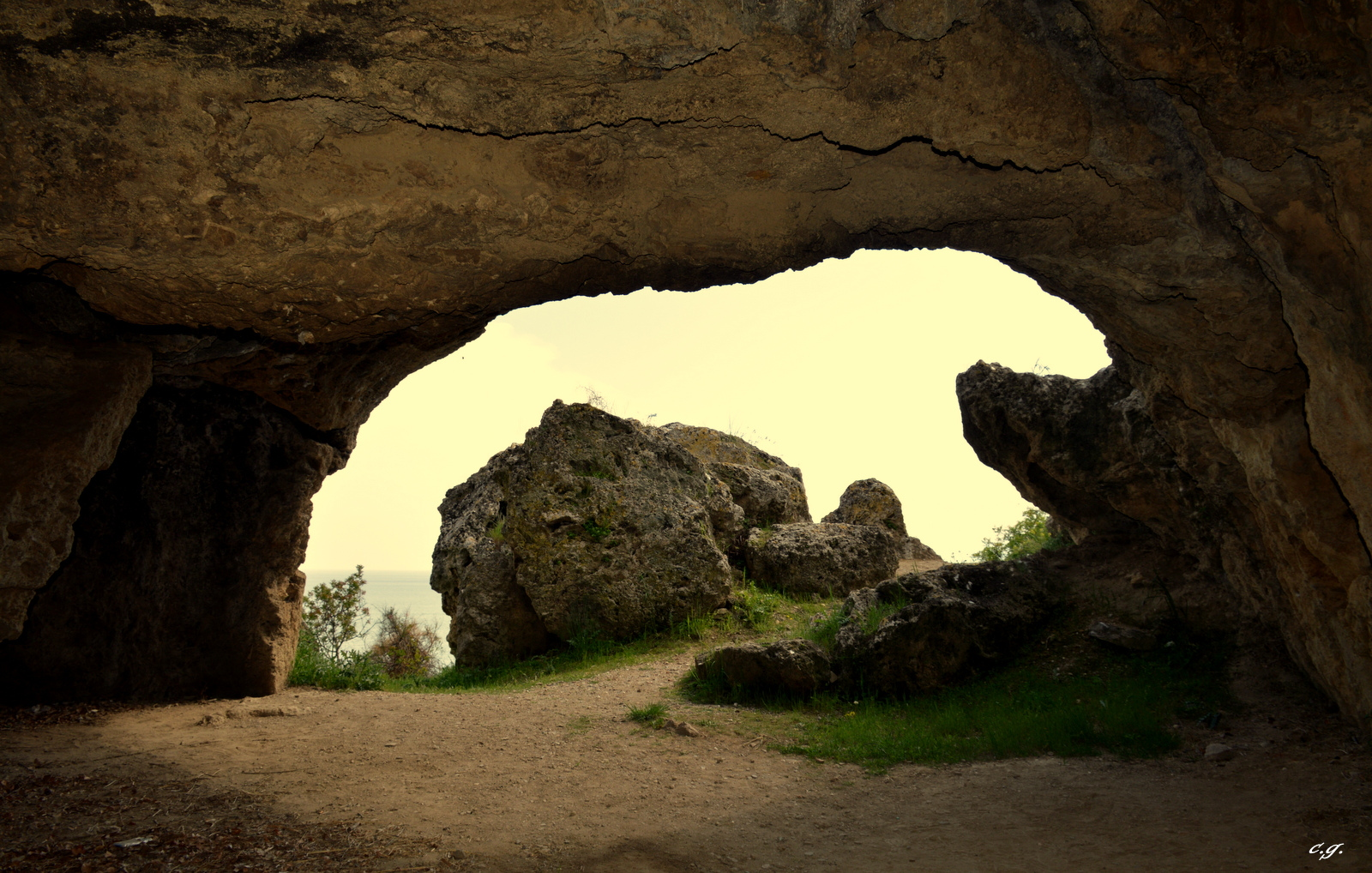
The "Cave of Cyclops"

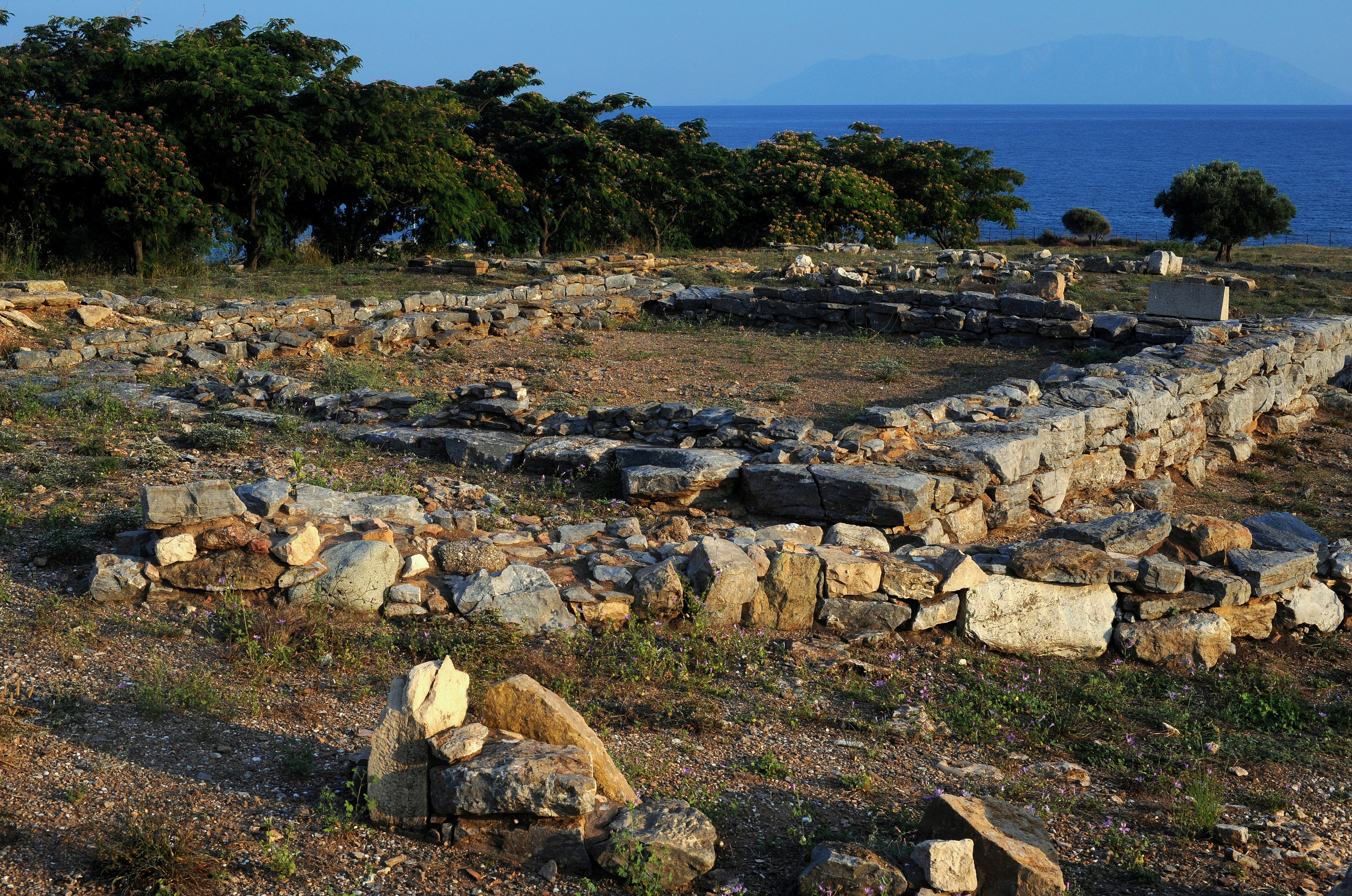
The archaeological site of Mesembria-Zone

=== Mesimbria-Zone ===
Mesimbria-Zone is an archaeological site 20 km from Alexandroupolis. A number of coins and ruins from an ancient city, probably Zone, have been found here. It was one of the colony-fortresses of Samothrace and flourished in the 5th and 4th centuries BC. The main buildings are: the sanctuary of Demeter, the temple of Apollo, the fortification wall, the walled settlement of the Hellenistic years, the cemetery and the Residences. It is noteworthy that a number of amphorae can be seen that were probably used as a waterproofing system.

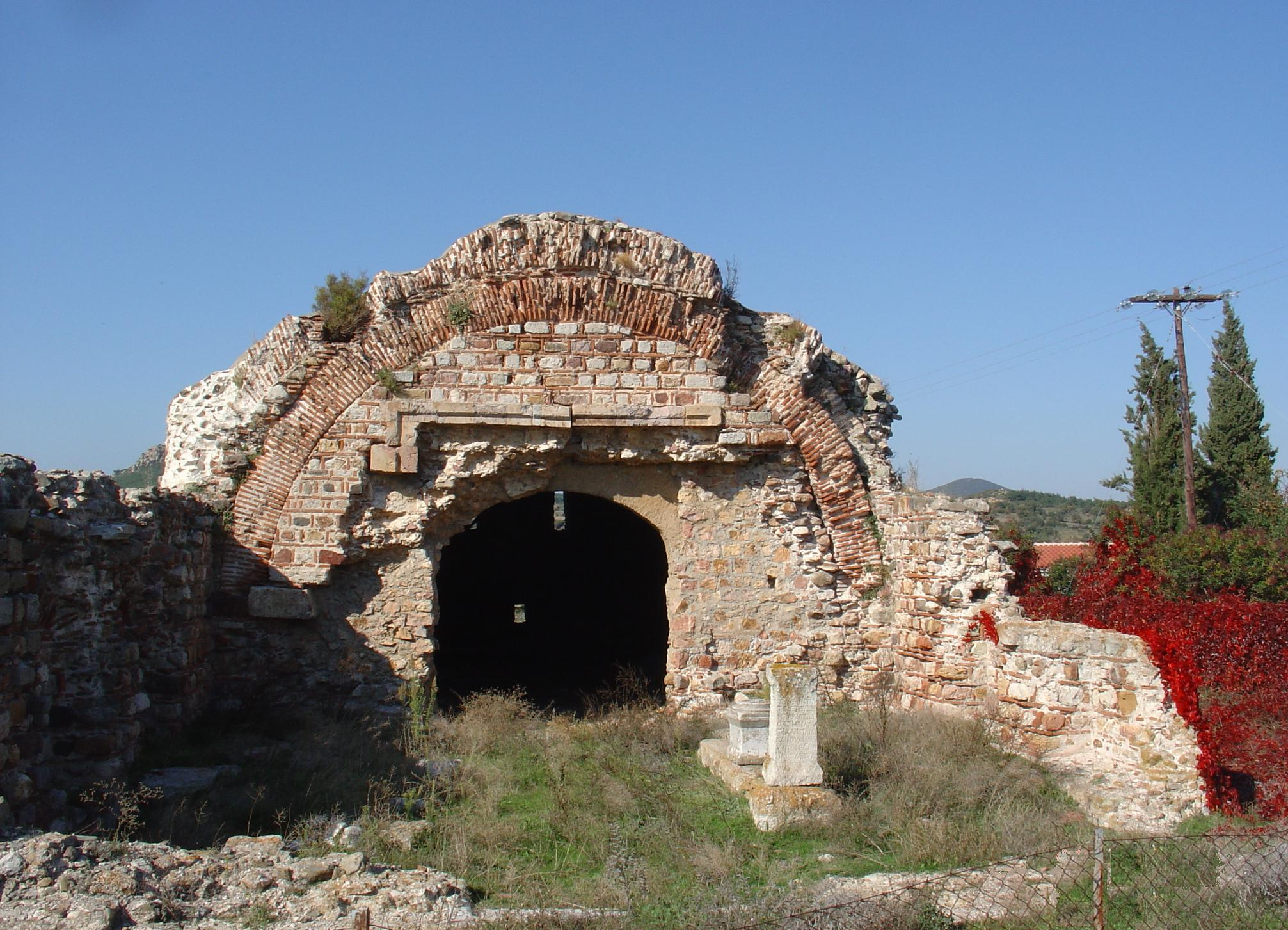
Thermal springs of Traianoupoli (Evrenos Bey Han).

=== Thermal springs of Traianoupoli ===
The thermal springs of Traianoupoli are 14 km away from the city of Alexandroupolis and are of the most famous hot springs in the region, since ancient times. Hana was an Ottoman inn and behind it during the Ottoman Empire there were baths (hamams), today ruins from the 16th century. In 1964, modern facilities for bath therapy and positherapy were rebuilt at the archeological site, which are officially recognized by the Greek state for their healing properties and are considered one of the most important in Greece.

=== Museums ===
- Historical Museum of Alexandroupolis (335, Democracy Avenue)
- Ethnological Museum of Thrace (63, 14 May street)
- Archaeological Museum of Alexandroupolis (44, Makris Avenue)
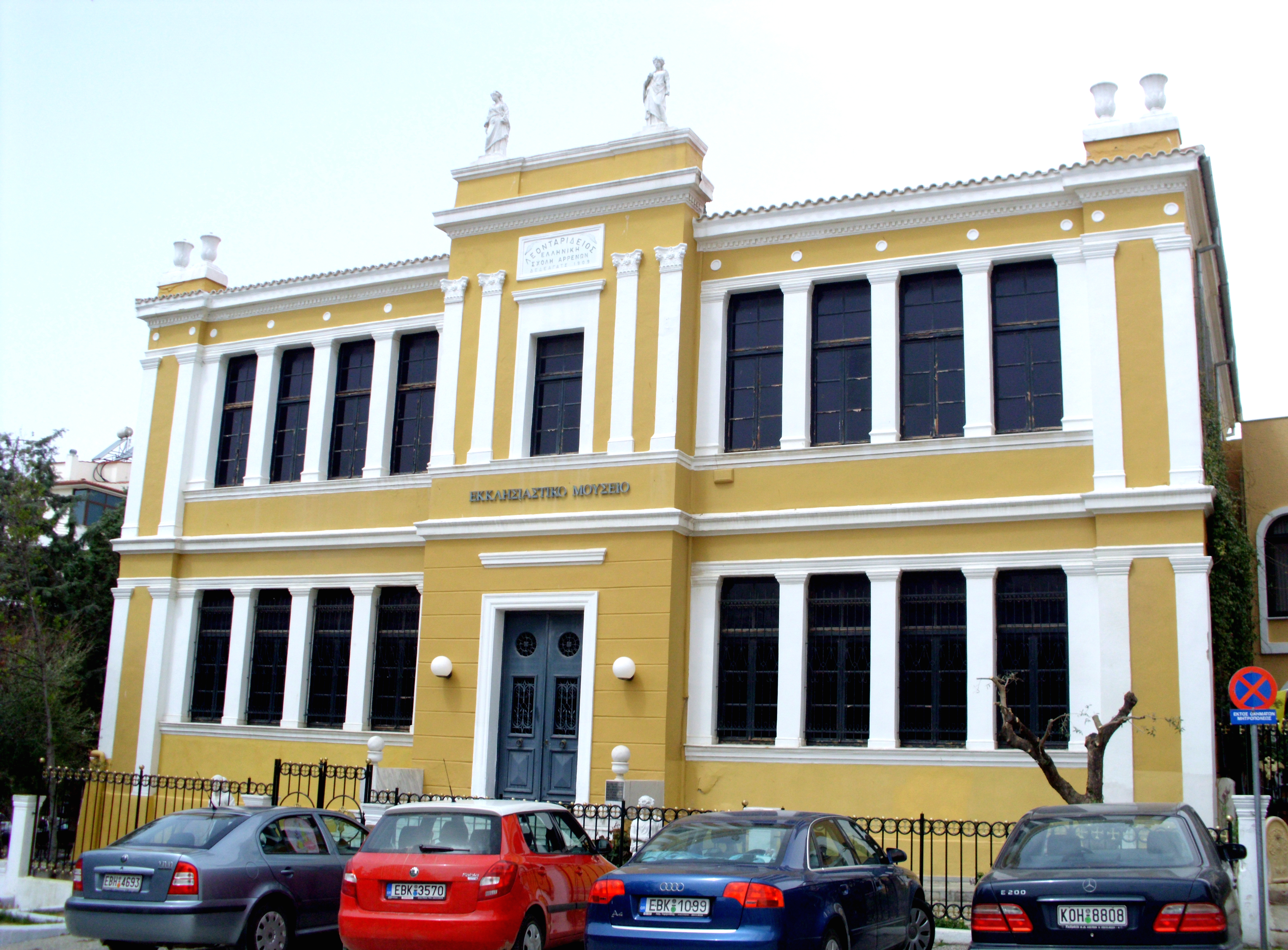
- Ecclesiastical Museum of Alexandroupolis
  Ecclesiastical Museum of the Holy Metropolis of Alexandroupolis (Mitropoleos Square)
- Folklore Museum of Cappadocian Association of Alexandroupolis (1, Mitropoulou street)
- Museum of Folklore and Natural History (8, Thermopylae street, Nea Chili)
- Museum of Natural History (Platanopathos of Maistros)
- Museum of Flora and Fauna (Art & Culture Center of the Municipality of Alexandroupolis "Georgios Vizyinos")
- Museum of Sarakatsani Tradition (Aisymi)

=== Historic Preserved Buildings of architectural interest ===
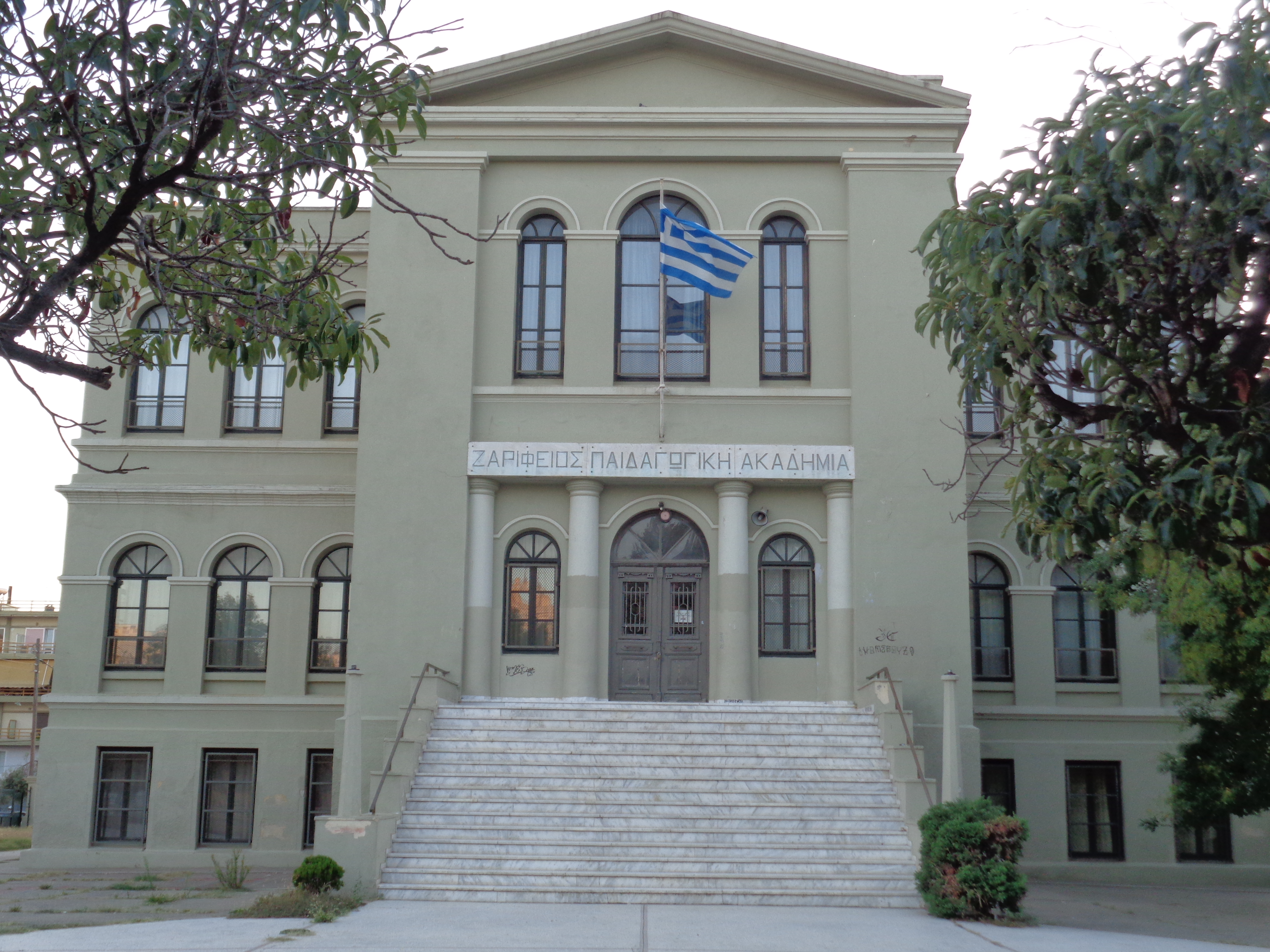
Zariphios Educational Academy founded by Georgios Zariphis

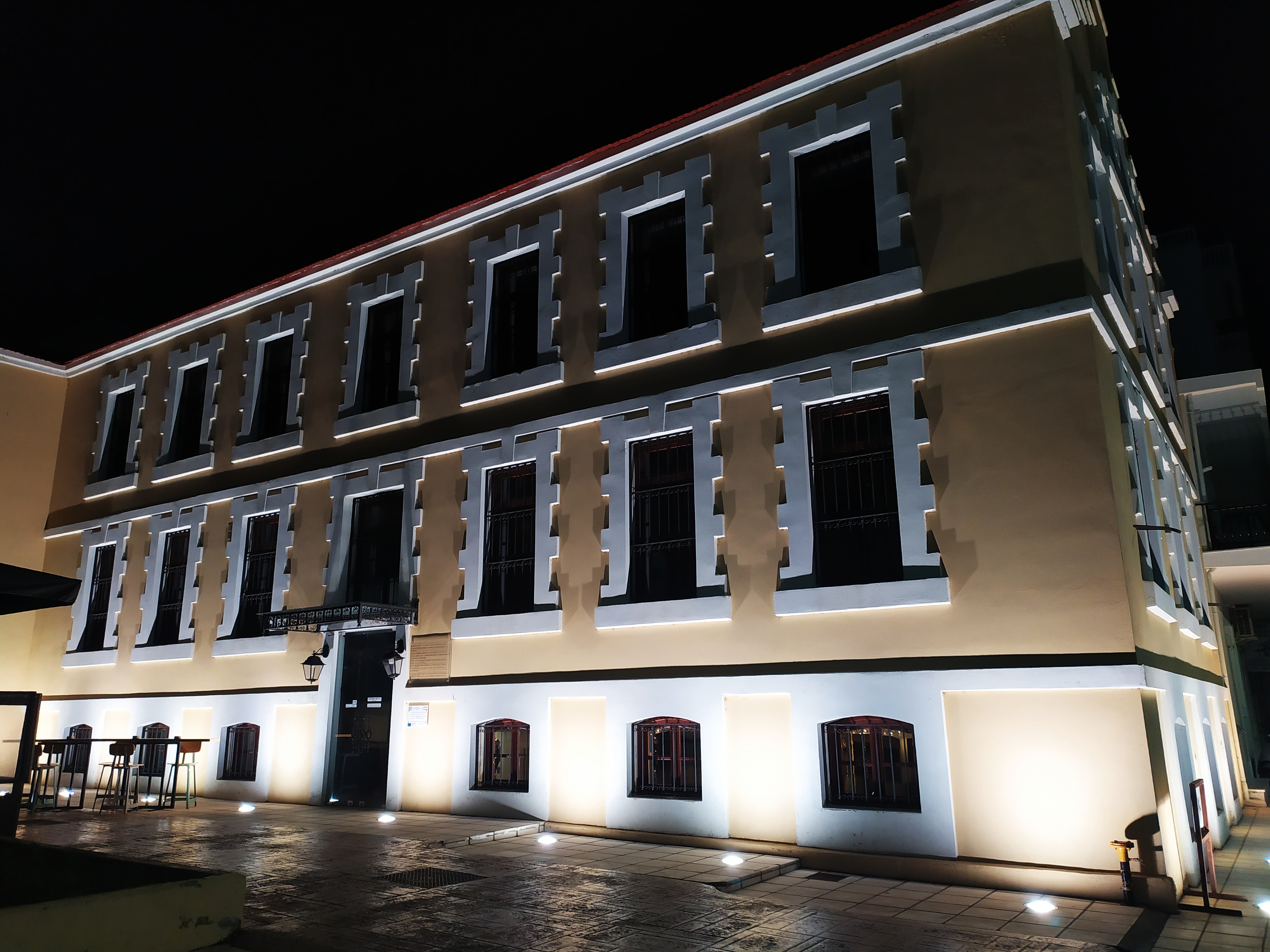
Old "Kapnomagazo" (tobacco store), the new municipal library of Alexandroupolis

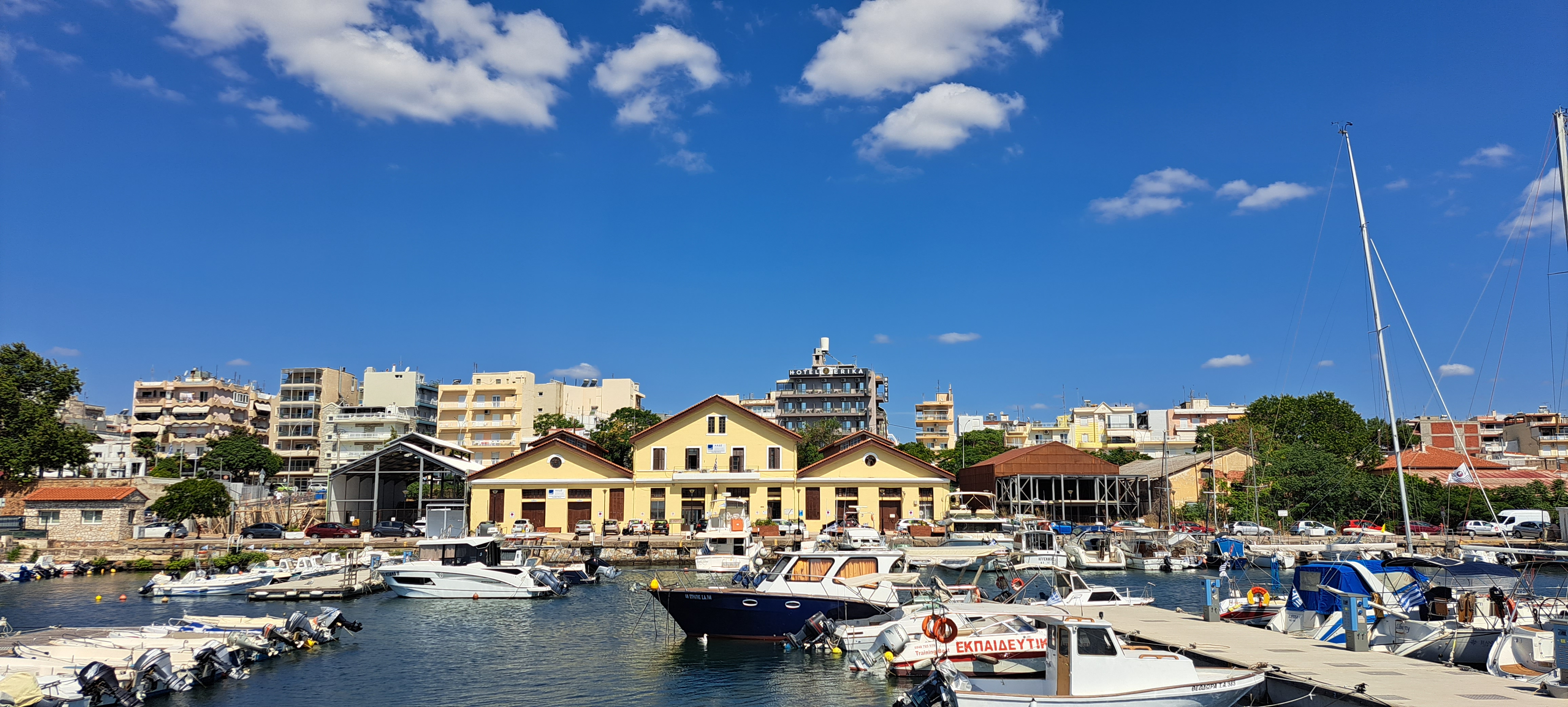
Alexandroupoli's port customs buildings

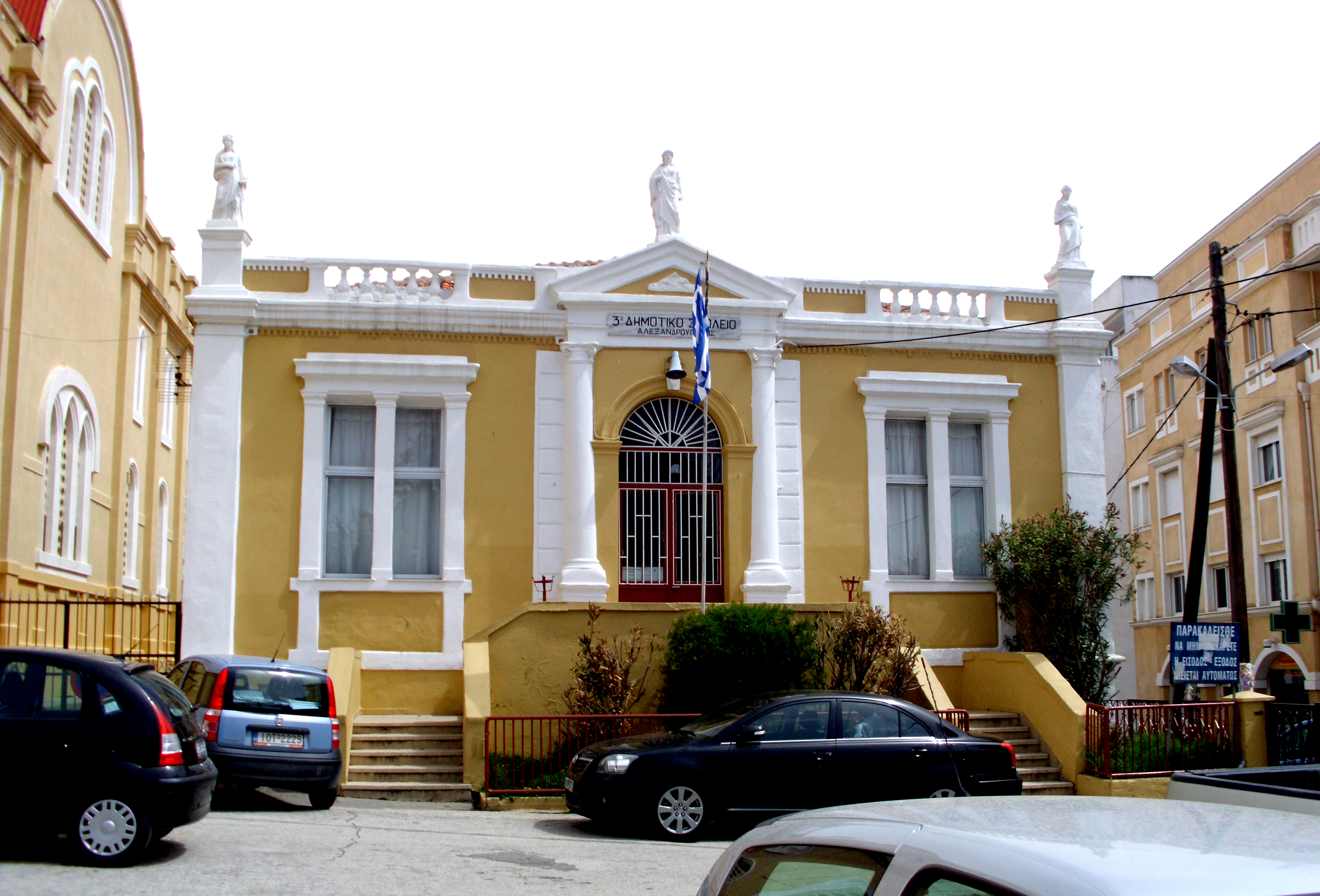
The 3rd Primary school of Alexandroupolis which is housed in the courtyard of the Metropolis
- Zariphios Pedagogical Academy
- Kapnomagazo (Tobacco store), now municipal library
- Old Hospital
- Democritus University of Thrace Building (Reading room)
- Port Customs Buildings
- 1st Primary School
- 3rd Primary School
- Building of Missionary Action

== Education ==
Alexandroupolis houses five Departments of the Democritus University of Thrace. These Departments are the following:

- Department of Medicine
- Department of Molecular Biology and Genetics
- Department of Nursing
- Department of Primary Level Education
- Department of Education Sciences in Early Childhood

Some highly specialised medical operations are performed in the new Regional General University Hospital – Research center, currently the largest one in Greece. The Department of Molecular Biology and Genetics is the only one in Greece in this scientific field.

The city has a network of public schools, from nurseries to high schools, under the responsibility of the city council.

== Sport ==
=== Volleyball ===
The Volleyball team of Ethnikos Alexandroupolis has a long-standing presence in the Greek Volleyleague with a long history in the sport, being the first provincial team to participate in the A1 Volleyball championship (42 years). He has made significant progress in all three home titles (Championship, Cup, League Cup), reaching the final (2014) and 8 times the first 4 teams in ranking, but also in European competitions, reaching two times the quarterfinals of the CEV Challenge Cup in 2015 and 2016. He has also featured great athletes of the Greek and global volleyball such as Marios Giourdas, Theodoros Baev and Andreas Andreadis, while Thanassis Moustakidis, Andrej Kravárik and Nikos Samaras also wore his shirt. He has also won many national championships in the infrastructure departments. In total, she has won 6 Greek U21 championships (1976, 1987, 2011, 2012, 2013, 2023), 2 Greek U18 championships (2008, 2011), 3 Greek U16 championships (2007, 2008, 2009). The headquarters of the team is the closed gym of "Michalis Paraskevopoulos", 1000 seats, located next to the "Fotis Kosmas" athletic stadium.

Other city's Volleyball Teams are:

- G.S.G. Nike Alexandroupolis: Women's team with 9 participations in Women's Greek Volleyball Championship and best place the 4th (1997–98), that allowed the team to participate in Challenge Cup. Nike has won 2 National Junior championships (1990, 1992) and 1 National Girls Championship (1989).
- G.E. Alexandroupolis, which has competed in the A2 Men's Volleyball category.
- Finikas Alexandroupolis, women's volleyball team, which competes in the A2 Women's Volleyball category

=== Football ===
The main sporting facilities are situated around the football and athletics stadium Fotis Kosmas. The stadium hosts various football teams, such as:

Notable football clubs based in Alexandroupolis
Club	Sports	Founded	Achievements
MGS Ethnikos Alexandroupolis	Football	1927	Earlier presence in 2nd Greek Division
Enosi Alexandroupoli F.C.	Football	1995	Earlier presence in 3rd Greek Division
Alexandroupoli F.C.	Football	2019	Earlier presence in 3rd Greek Division (2019-20, 2020-21, 2021-22, 2022-23, 2024-25)

=== Basketball ===
There are two basketball teams in the city: Ethnikos Alexandroupolis and Olympiada Alexandroupolis. Each game between them is a local derby. These two teams compete in the regional basketball championship of East Macedonia and Thrace. Ethnikos Alexandroupolis has celebrated two rises and participations in the Greek C Basket League (1995, 2014), counting equal relegations. The biggest success of the team's academy is the 3rd place in the National Children Basketball Championship in 1983/84.

The U14 Girls' team of Olympiada Alexandroupolis has won three consecutive times the U14 championship of Eastern Macedonia and Thrace, in 2020–2021, 2021-2022 and 2022–2023. Also, in 2021-2022 and in 2022-23 qualified to the Greek U14 Girls' Basketball Championship, placing 8th and 7th respectively in Greece in this age category.

=== Handball-Beach Handball ===
In beach handball the team of Kyklopes Alexandroupolis has won 6 Greek Men's Beach Handball Championships, 4 of them consecutive (2016, 2017, 2018, 2019), 1 Greek Men's Beach Handball Cup (2022) and 2 Greek Women's Beach Handball Cup (2022, 2024). The women's handball team has 7 participations in the Women's A1 Handball Championship having achieved as best place the third in 1994-95 that allowed the team to participate in Challenge Cup next year. Also the men's handball team of Kyklopes has participated in the A2 Ethniki Handball.

=== Swimming ===
In June 2013 was inaugurated the new Municipal Swimming Pool of Alexandroupolis "Dimosthenis Michalentzakis", which is the most modern swimming pool in Greece in terms of technical equipment and one of the most modern in Europe.

In this swimming pool major international events have been hosted, such as the Division 1 of 2026 FINA Men's Water Polo World Cup in April 2026, the Division 1 of 2025 FINA Women's Water Polo World Cup in January 2025 and the international synchronized swimming meeting Fina Artistic Swimming World Series - Hellas Beetles, in April 2019.

It is the headquarters of the swimming clubs: OFTHA and NOA, but also of Ethnikos Alexandroupolis, water polo team. NOA's water polo team is participating in the A2 Ethniki Water Polo. OFTHA has held the first place in Thrace for several years and is one of the top clubs in Greece, while many of the club's athletes have achieved distinctions in national championships.

Also, 3 disabled swimmers from Alexandroupolis are members of the National Team and represent Greece at the World Para Swimming Championships and Paralympic Games: Dimosthenis Michalentzakis (Gold Paralympic Medal in 2016 at 100 m. butterfly S9), Dimitrios Karypidis (4th Paralympian in 2021 at 100 m. backstroke S1) and Alexandros Lergios (first participation at the Paralympic Games of Tokyo, 2021).

=== Track ===
The track team of Ethnikos Alexandroupolis also had a tradition as being in the first 10 teams of the Greek track championship ranking 4 times in men (1953, 1955, 1956, 1958), best place the 4th (1956), and in women (1959, 1989, 1990, 1991), best place also the 4th (1959). It has featured great athletes such as: Hrysopigi Devetzi, Dimosthenis Magginas and Fotis Kosmas. Many athletes of the team have won Panhellenic and Balkan medals in development categories.

=== Table Tennis ===
The last 10 years, Ethnikos Alexandroupolis has been consistently among the top 10 teams in Greece according to the Hellenic Table Tennis Federation rating tables. The women's team participates in the Greek Women's First Division (A1), while the men's team participates in the Greek Men's Second Division (A2).

As far as infrastructure teams are concerned, the club was 4 times in the finals of the Panhellenic Junior Children Championship (2016, 2017, 2018, 2019). In 2017 he won the 1st place and was the Greek Champion in this category, while in 2016, 2017, 2019 he won the 2nd place in Greece. In the category of Children, in 2017, 2018 and 2022 the team of Ethnikos Alexandroupolis took the 3rd place in the Panhellenic Table Tennis Championship, while in 2019 was the champion in this category and climbed to the top of Greece. In 2019, Ethnikos Alexandroupolis took the 2nd place in the Panhellenic Table Tennis Championship in the category of Young Women.

Athletes of the club are at the top of the federation's ranking list by winning cups and medals at the Panhellenic Open Championships.

=== Badminton ===
Since 2018, the Badminton department of Ethnikos Alexandroupolis has been competing in the A1 Greek Badminton Division, while club's athletes have won medals at the Panhellenic Development Championships.

=== Rugby ===
In 2009, the stadium hosted an international rugby match between Greece and Bulgaria; the match was the first time that Greece had played a home match outside of Attica.

=== Run Greece Alexandroupolis ===
Since 2014, with the help of the track team of Ethnikos Alexandroupolis, Run Greece Alexandroupolis is held, which continues until today, on the last Sunday of September, co-organized by SEGAS, Municipality of Alexandroupolis and Region of Eastern Macedonia and Thrace. Run Greece includes 800m race for children and races 5 km, 10 km.

=== Via Egnatia Run ===
The international race 'Via Egnatia Run' is an action of Evros Regional Unit which started in 2016 and is being held every May. It is a 21.1 km half-marathon on the route of the Ancient Via Egnatia, which once connected Constantinople to Rome, culturally, economically and commercially, passing through the ancient city of Sale (today's Alexandroupolis) and Traianoupoli. There is also a race of 5 km, and two races of 800 meters for disabled people and children. It takes place on the Alexandroupolis-Kipoi National Road and the routes have been certified by the Association of International Marathons and Distance Races (AIMS). The goal is through the sport to get to know the culture and history of this important route.

=== Thrace Night Run ===
Every June Thrace Night Run, which has become an institution the recent years and includes 5 and 10 km runs, is held on the coastal avenue of Alexandroupoli since 2021. The organization is undertaken by the sports club "Dromeas of Thrace" with the support of the Alexandroupoli's Municipality and EAS SEGAS of Eastern Macedonia and Thrace.

== International relations ==
=== Twin towns – sister cities ===
- Burgas, Bulgaria (1997)
- Lakatamia, Cyprus (1993)
- Simferopol, Ukraine (2016)
- Sosnovy Bor, Russia (2011)
- Vyborgsky District, Saint Petersburg, Russia (2015)
- Agia Napa, Cyprus (2025)

=== Consulate ===
The city hosts honorary consulate from the following country:

- Russia

== Notable people ==
- Hrysopiyi Devetzi (1976), Greek athlete, silver Olympic medalist in triple jump (Athens 2004)
- Fotis Kosmas (1926–1995), Mediterranean and 7th Olympic winner in decathlon
- Aggeliki Tsiolakoudi (1976), second best Greek Javelin thrower
- Dimosthenis Magginas (1982), middle-distance and long-distance runner
- Dimosthenis Michalentzakis (1998), Greek Gold Paralympic champion swimmer in 100 m. butterfly S9 (Rio, 2016) and Bronze Paralympic Medalist in 100 m. freestyle S8 (Tokyo, 2021)
- Demis Nikolaidis (1973), Greek former international footballer, Euro 2004 champion
- Marinos Ouzounidis (1968), Greek former international footballer, football coach
- Sotiris Mavromatis (1966), Greek former international footballer. Champion with PAOK in 1984-85 and finalist with Greek U-21 national team in UEFA Euro U-21 1988.
- Manolis Siopis (1994), Greek international footballer
- Savvas Gentsoglou (1990), Greek footballer
- Stavros Stathakis (1987), Greek footballer
- Dimitris Komesidis (1988), Greek footballer
- Athanasios Tsigas (1982), Greek former footballer
- Marios Giourdas (1973), Greek former international volleyball player
- Andreas Andreadis (1982), Greek international volleyball player
- Rafail Koumentakis (1993), Greek international volleyball player
- Anestis Dalakouras (1993), Greek international volleyball player
- Paraskevas Tselios (1997), Greek international volleyball player
- Giorgos Valavanidis (1974-2024), Greek former basketball player, silver medalist with Greece men's national under-16 basketball team in Eurobasket U16 1991, Saporta winner in 1991, Greek champion in 1992 and Korac winner in 1994 with PAOK
- Nikos Hadjinikolaou (1962), Greek journalist
- Lefteris Hapsiadis (1953–2023), Greek Lyrics creator and writer
- Stavento (Michalis Kouinelis) (1979), Greek hip-hop singer
- Arete Kosmidou (1997), Greek singer
- Gregoris Mentzas (1960), Greek management scientist and professor at the National Technical University of Athens
- Georgios Kandilaptis (1881–1971), Greek scholar, journalist and teacher

== Historical population ==
Alexandroupolis is the 10th largest city in Greece.

Year	Town	Municipal unit	Municipality
1940	19,384	_	_
1951	18,916	_	_
1961	21,209	_	_
1971	25,529	_	_
1981	35,799	35,799	–
1991	39,261	38,939	–
2001	50,017	52,720	–
2011	57,812	58,125	72,959
2021	59,723	62,936	71,751

== Gallery ==
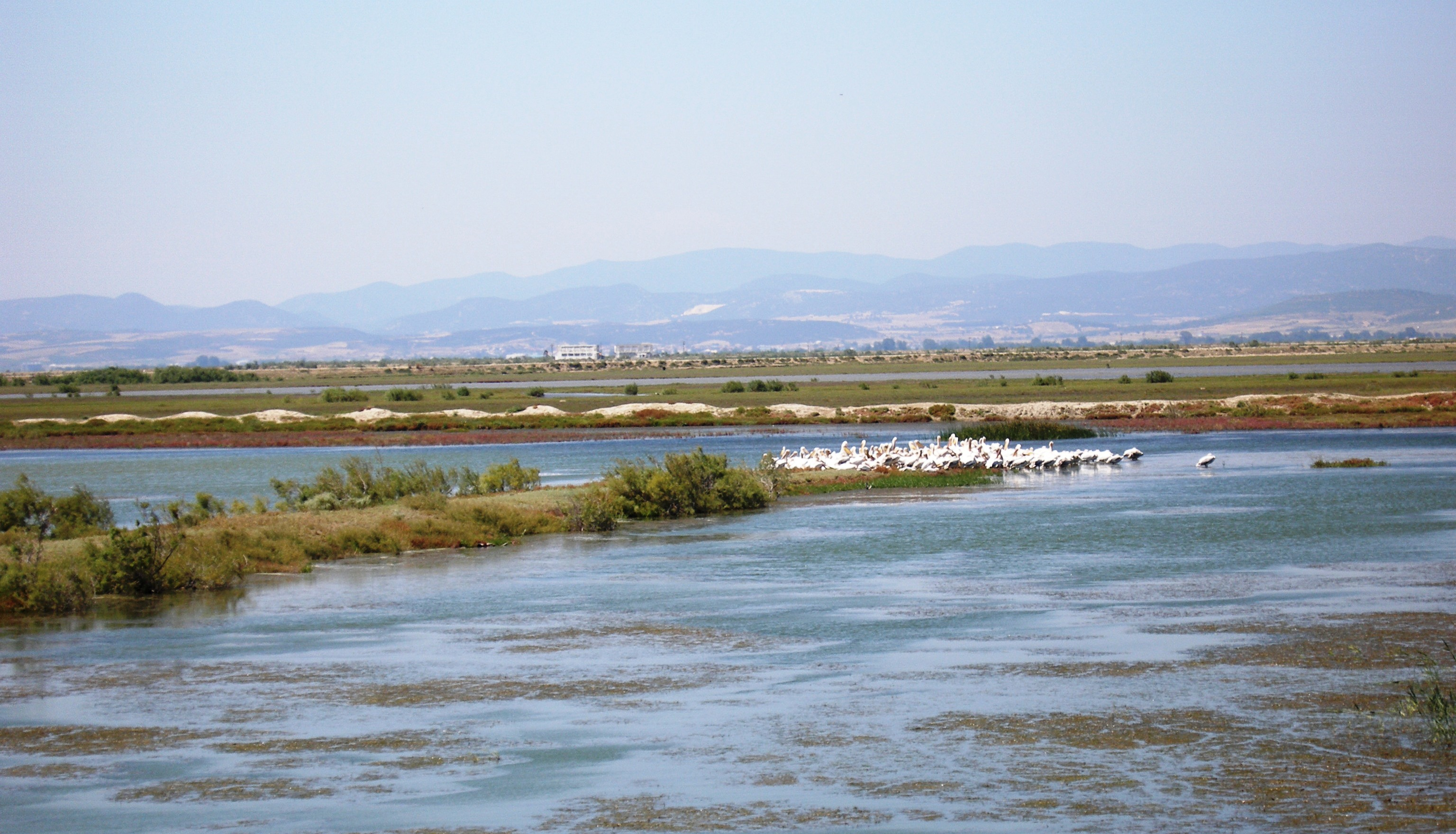
Evros Delta

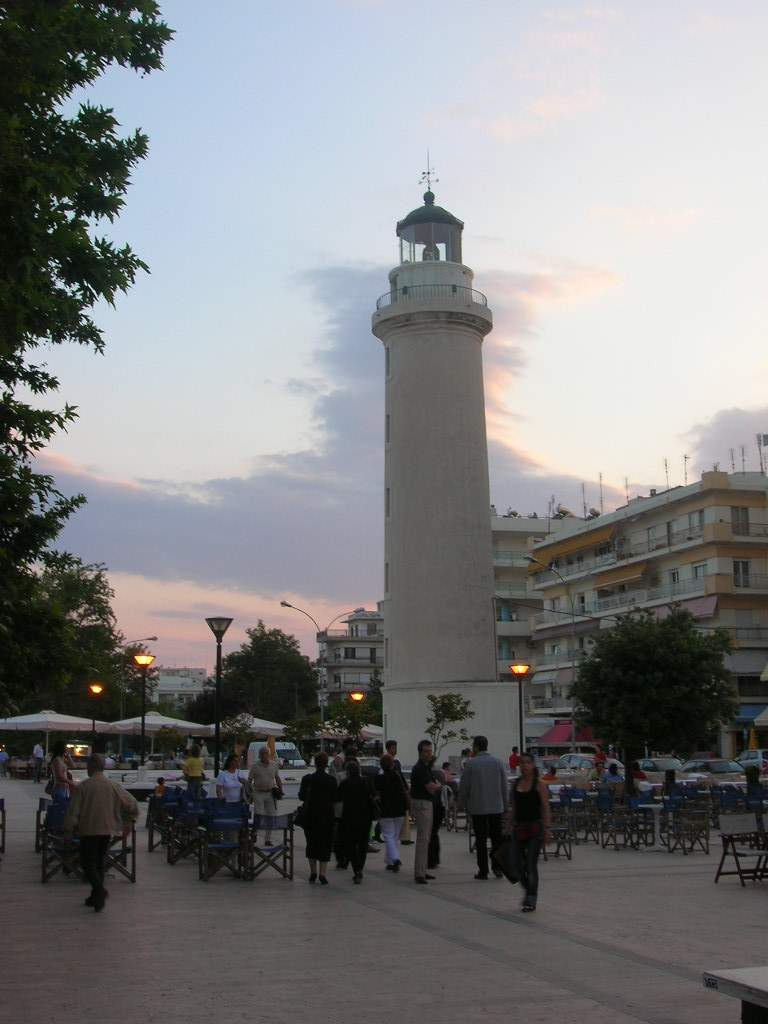
The lighthouse of Alexandroupolis

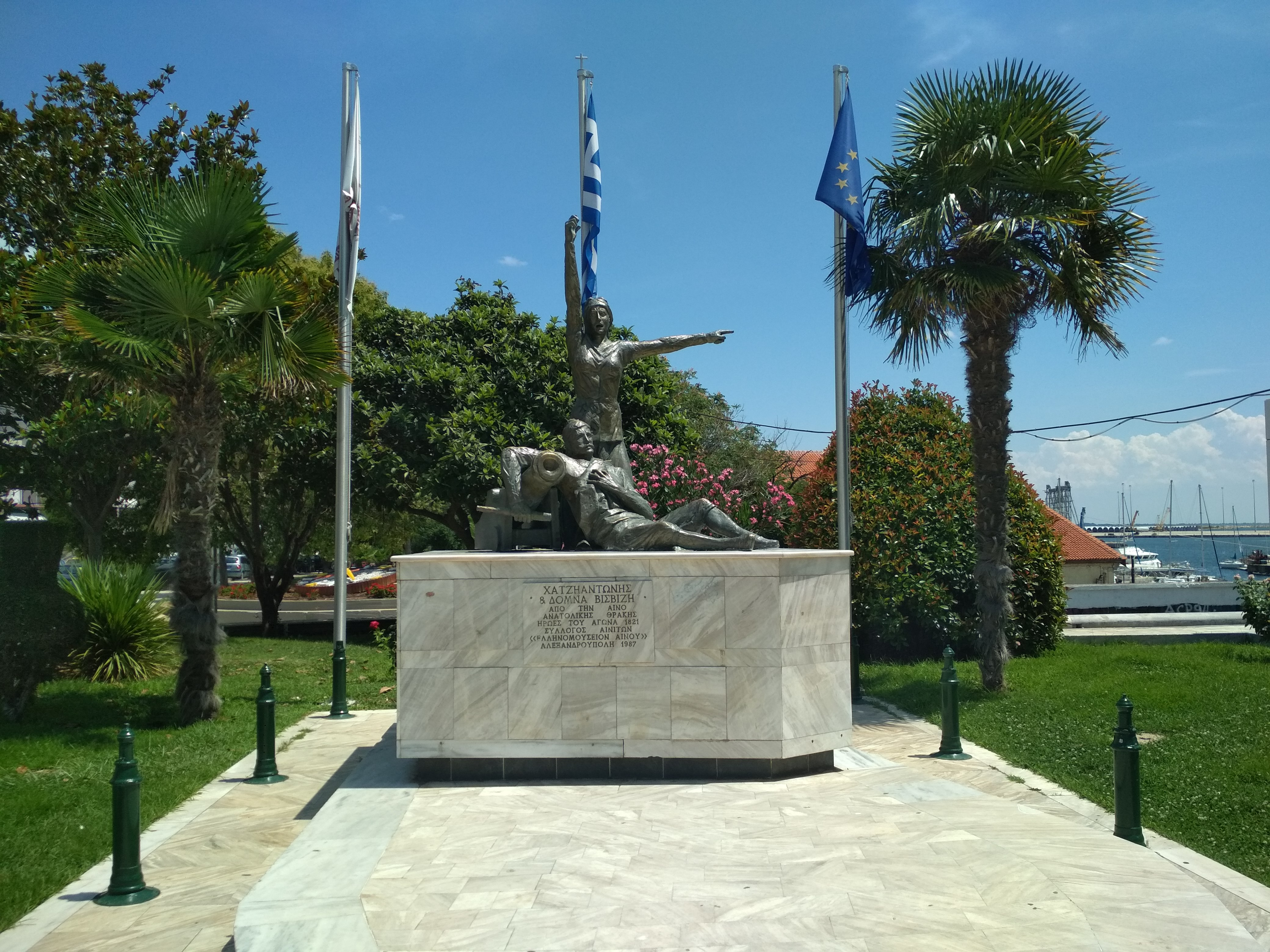
Statue of Domna and Antonis Visvizis, heroes of the Greek War of Independence from Thrace

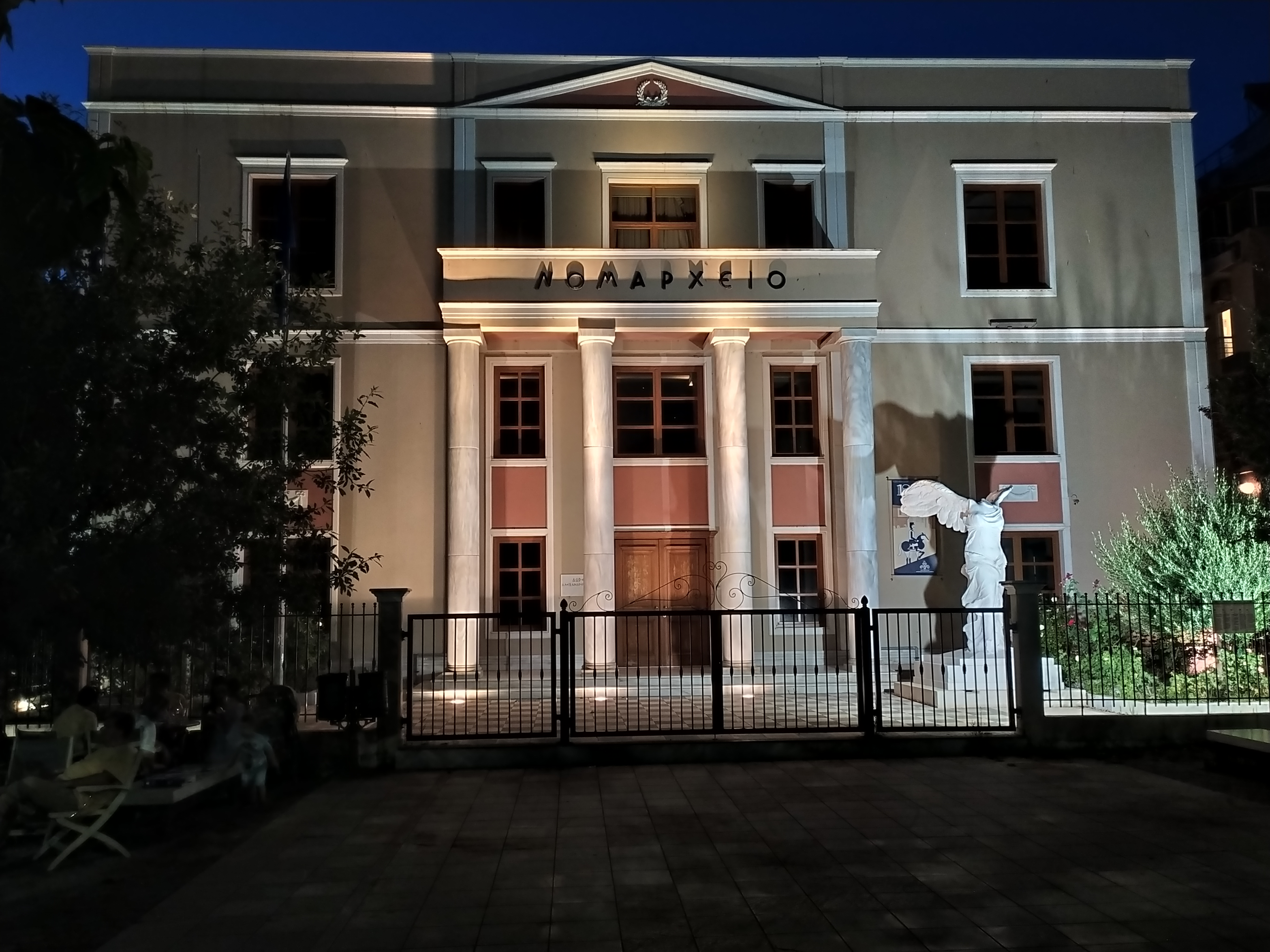
The building of the regional unit of Evros and with an exact copy of the Winged Victory of Samothace in the courtyard

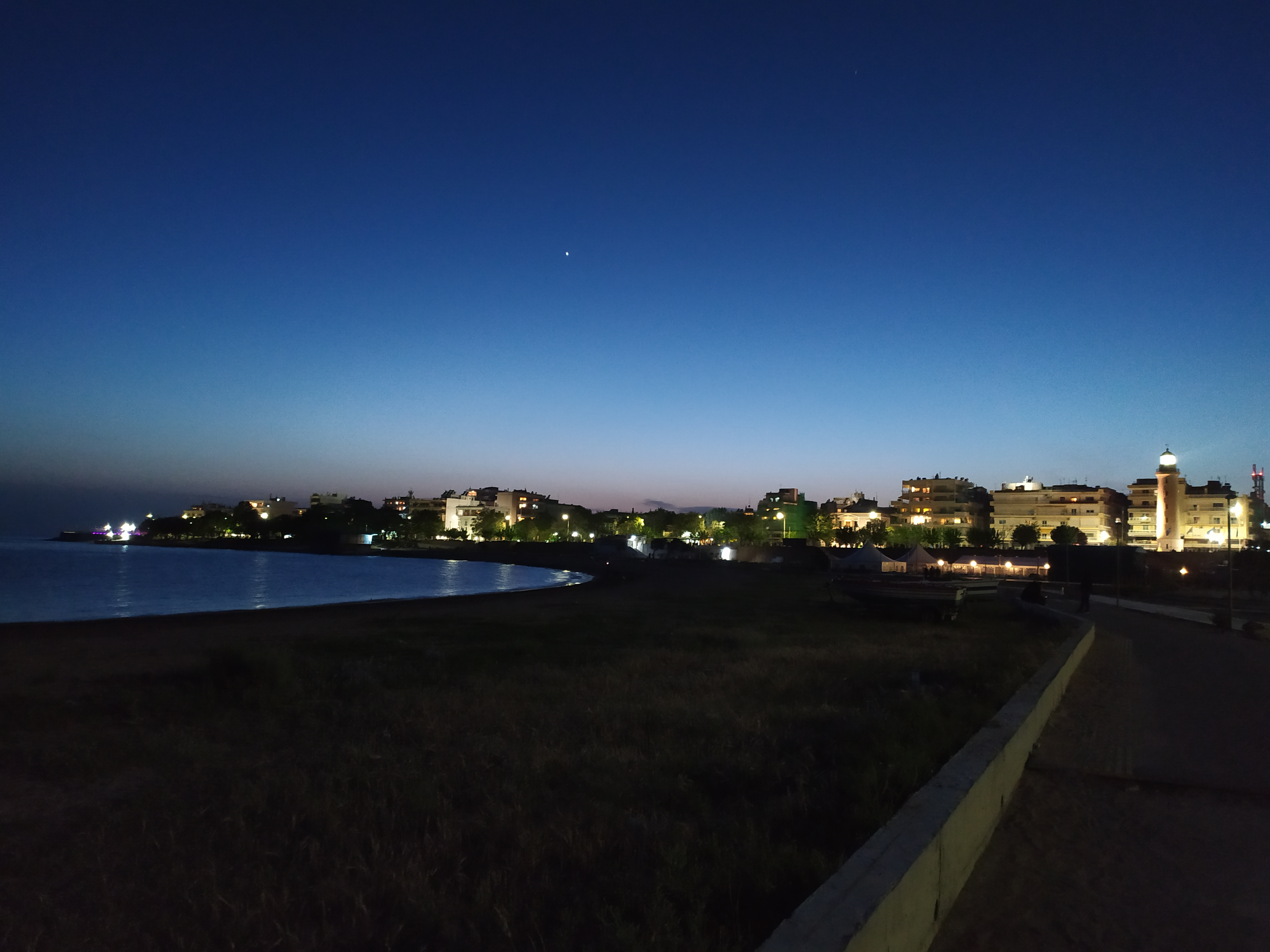
View of Alexandroupolis' coastal area

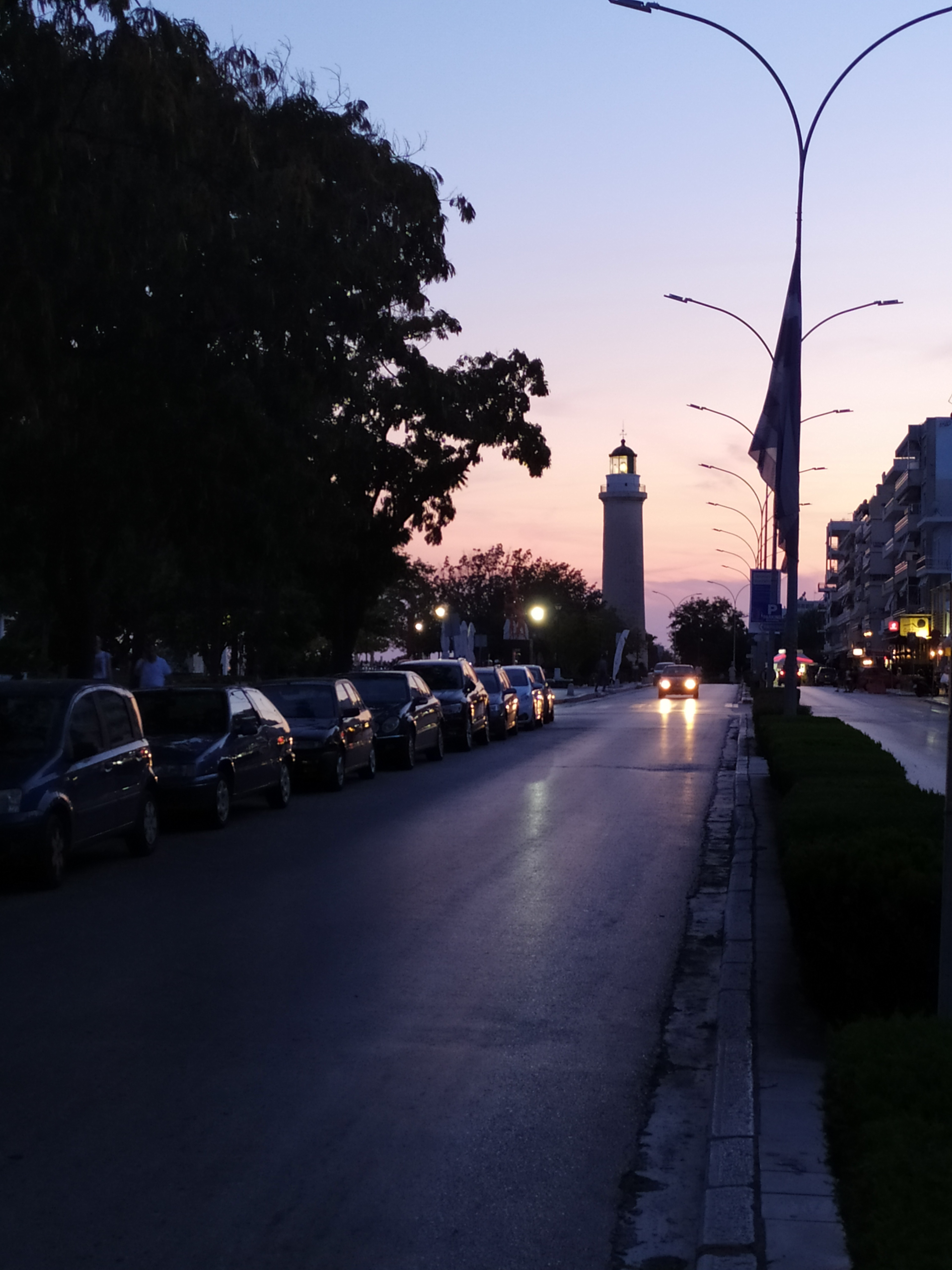
The lighthouse of Alexandroupolis and the coastal road

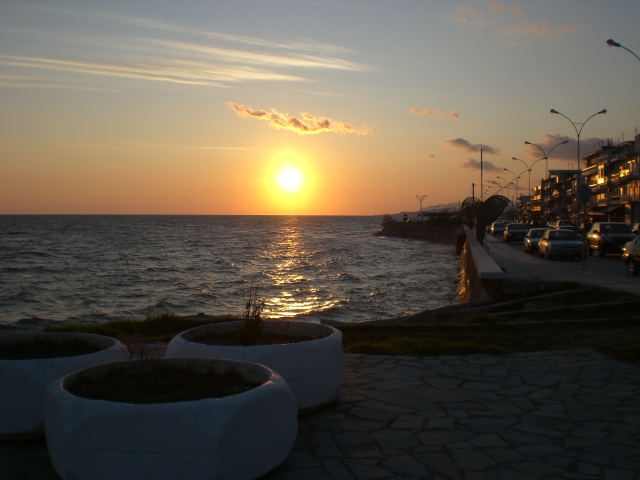
Sunset in Alexandroupolis

St Joseph's Catholic church

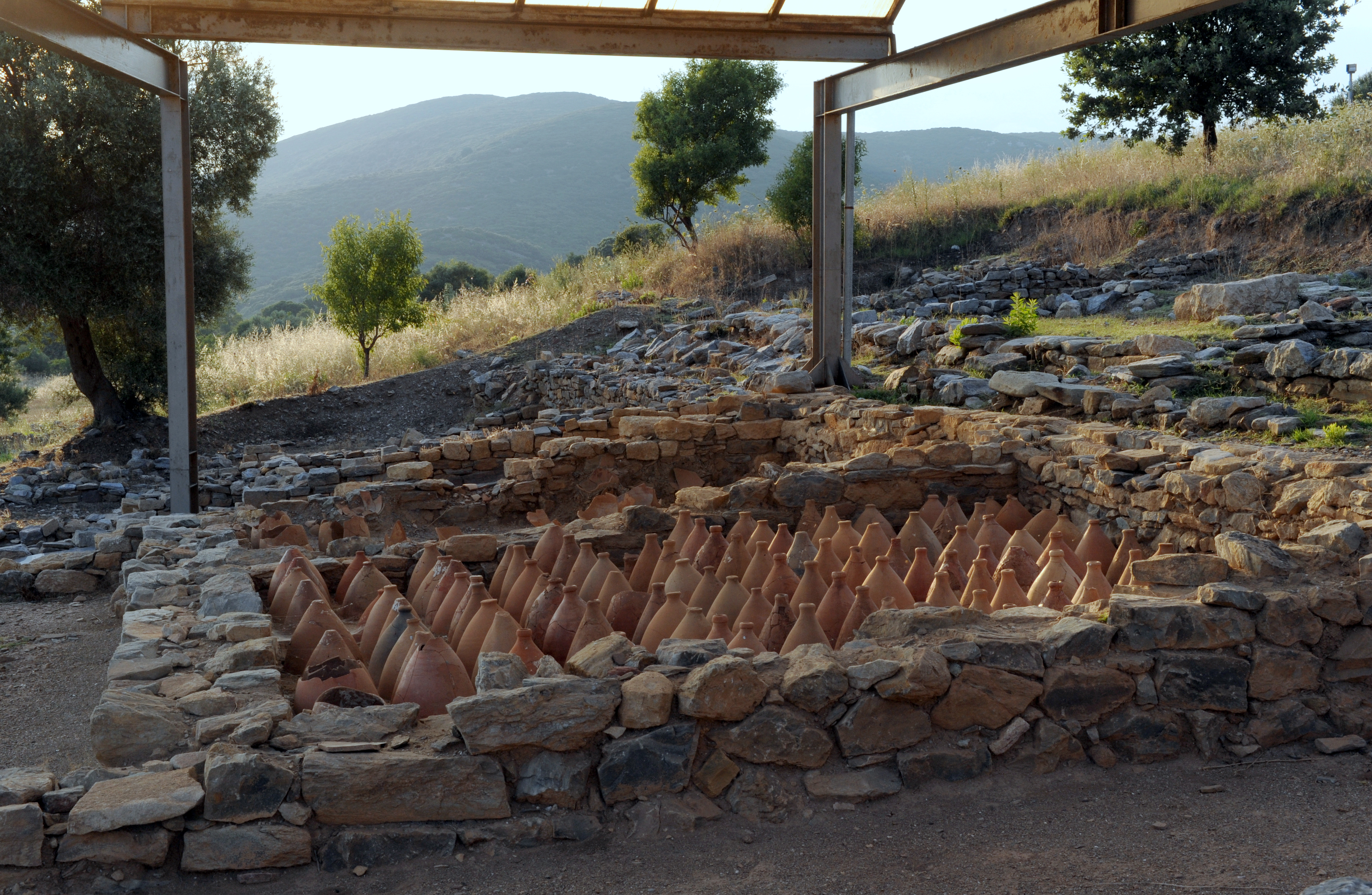
Waterproofing system with amphorae at the archaeological site of Mesembria-Zone

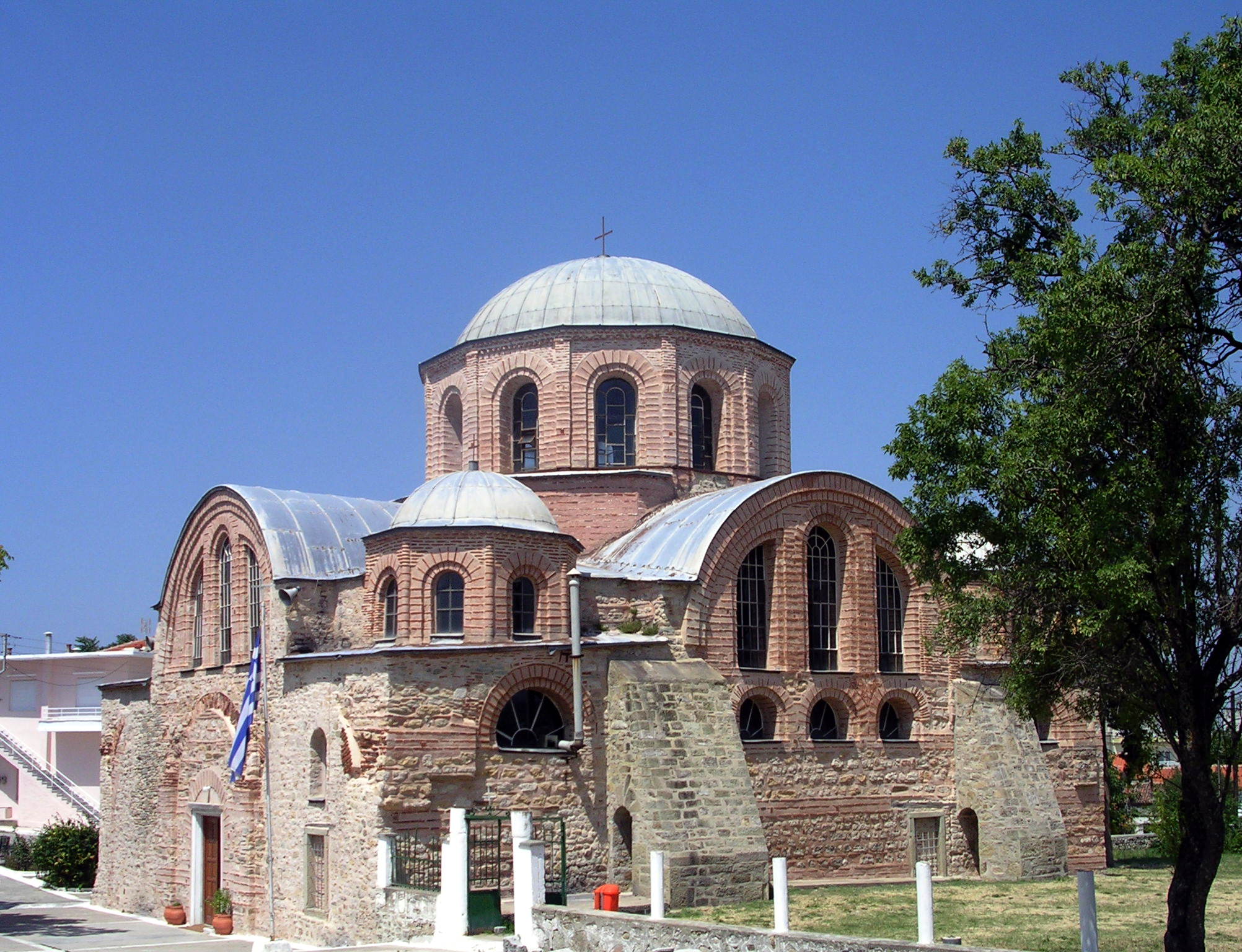
The church of Theotokos Kosmosoteira in Feres

Ottoman baths in nearby Traianoupoli

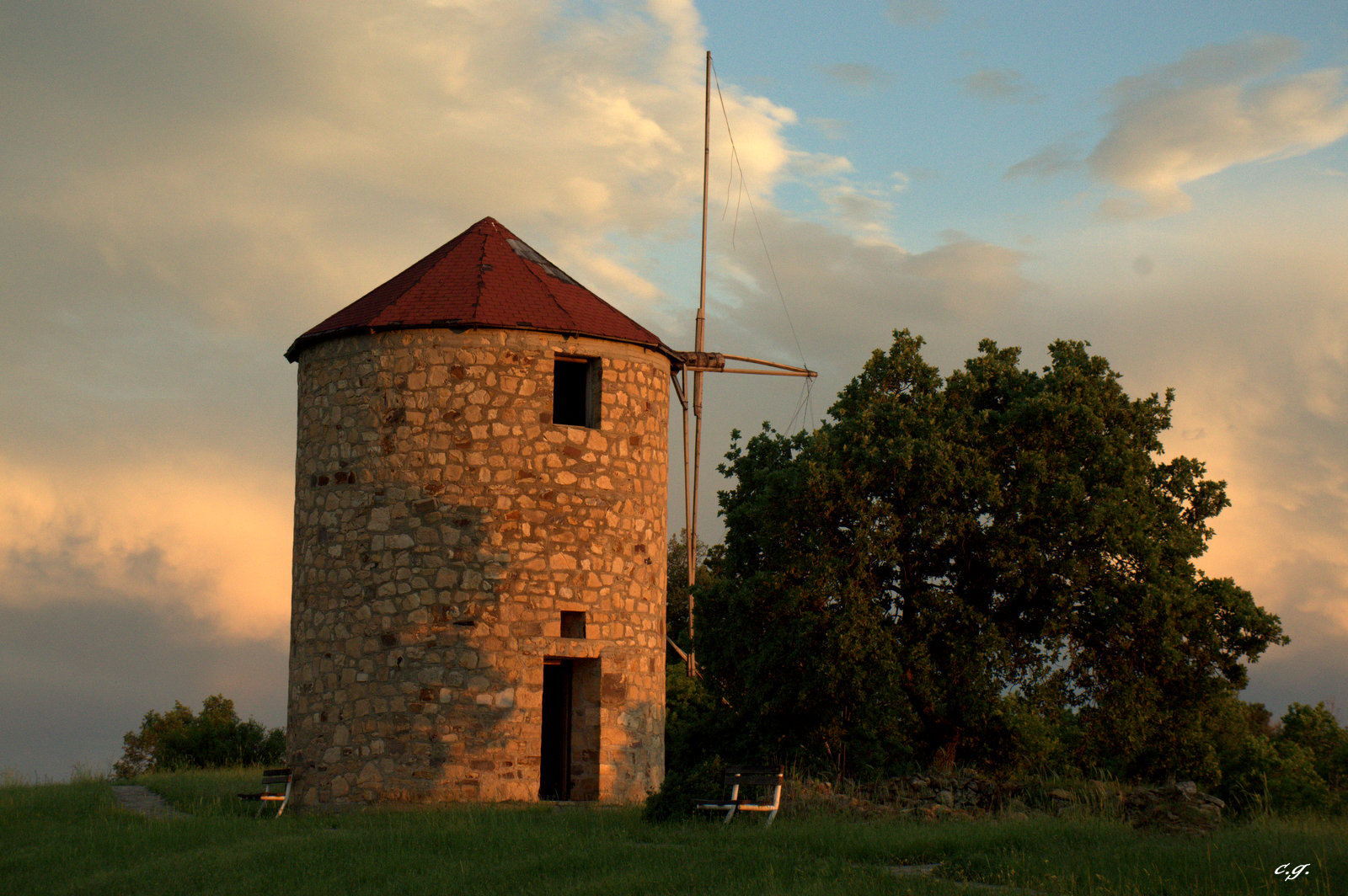
One of 6 windmills in Melia

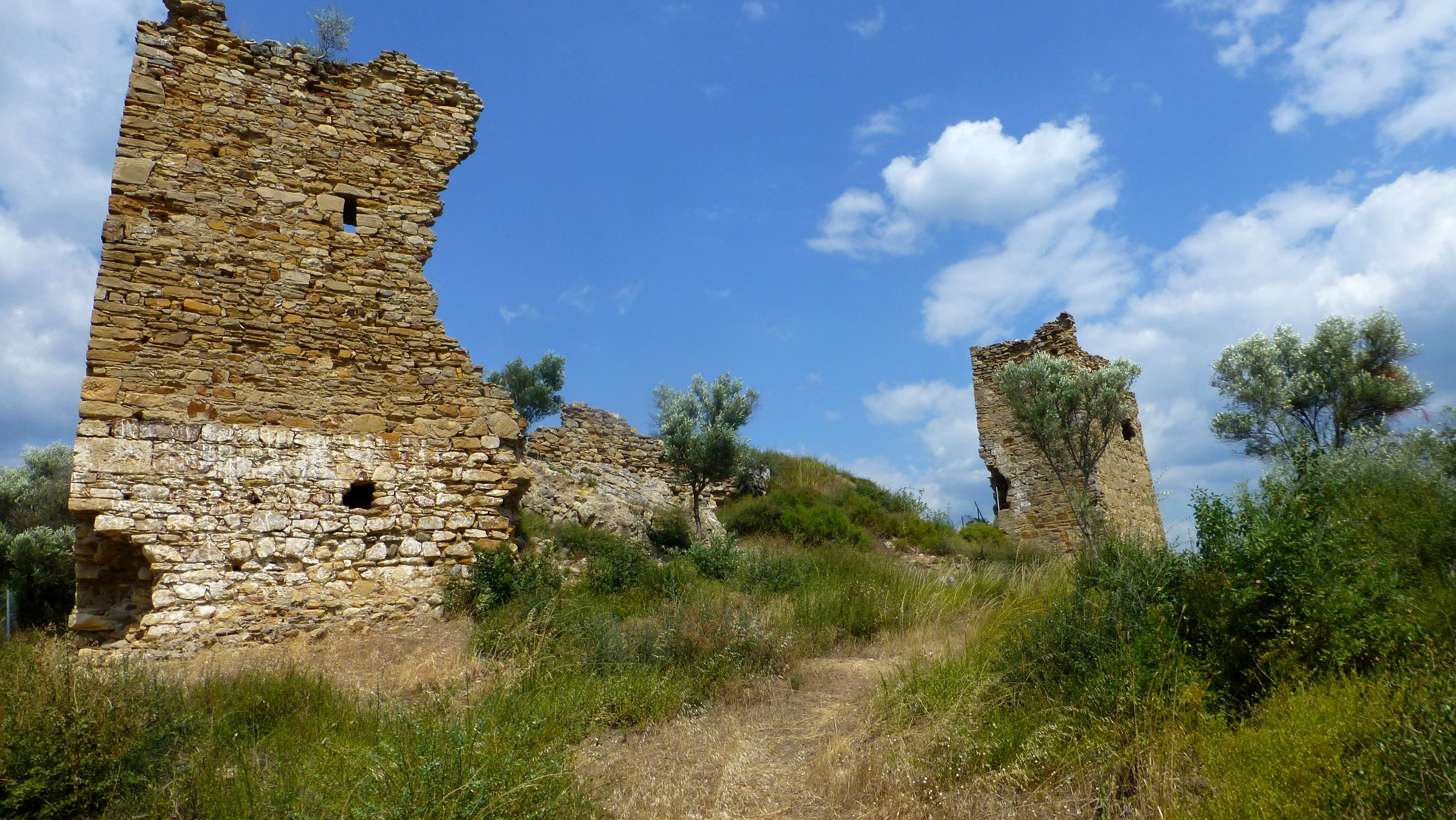
The castle of Avas

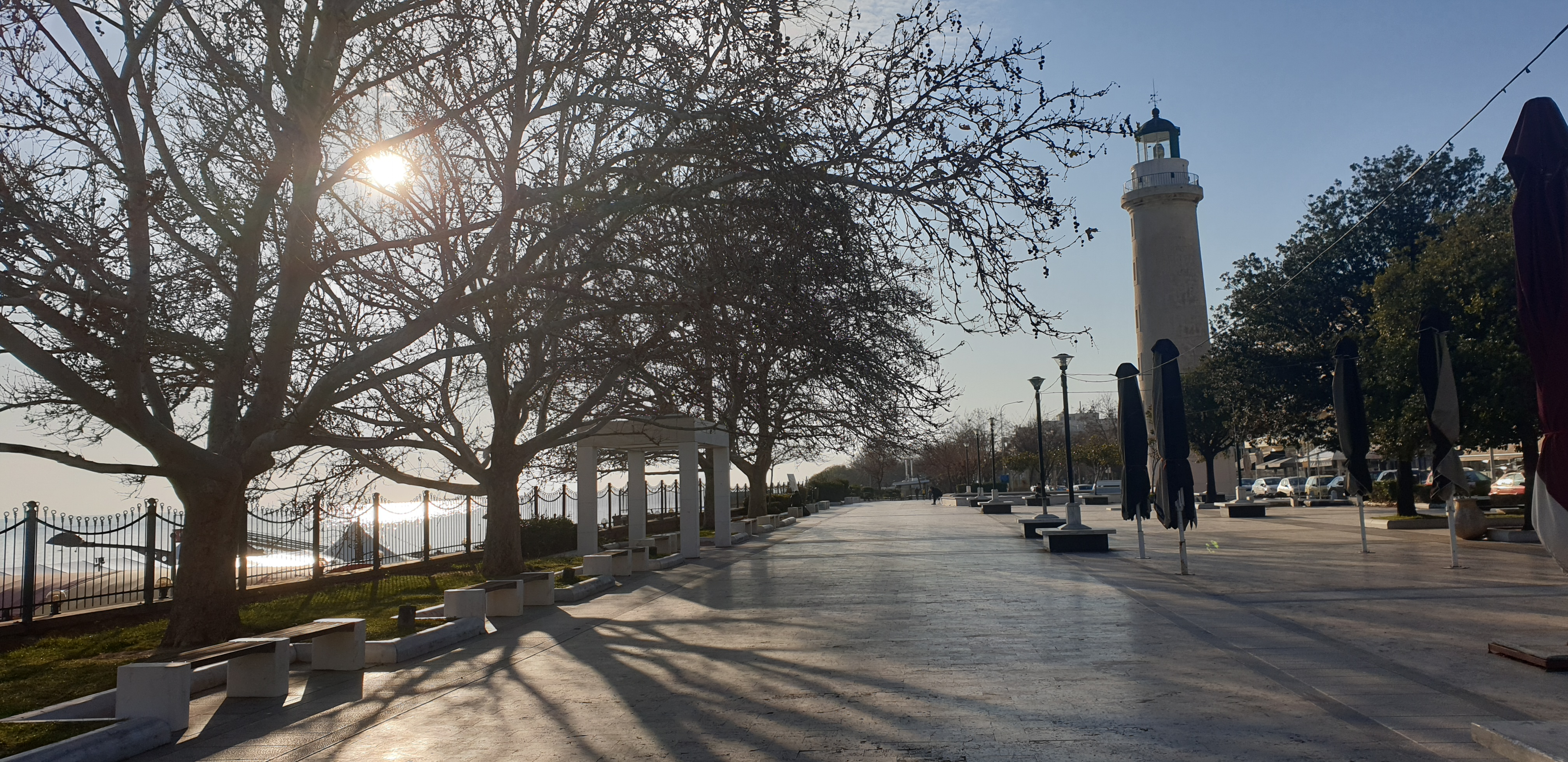
The square of Alexandroupolis' lighthouse

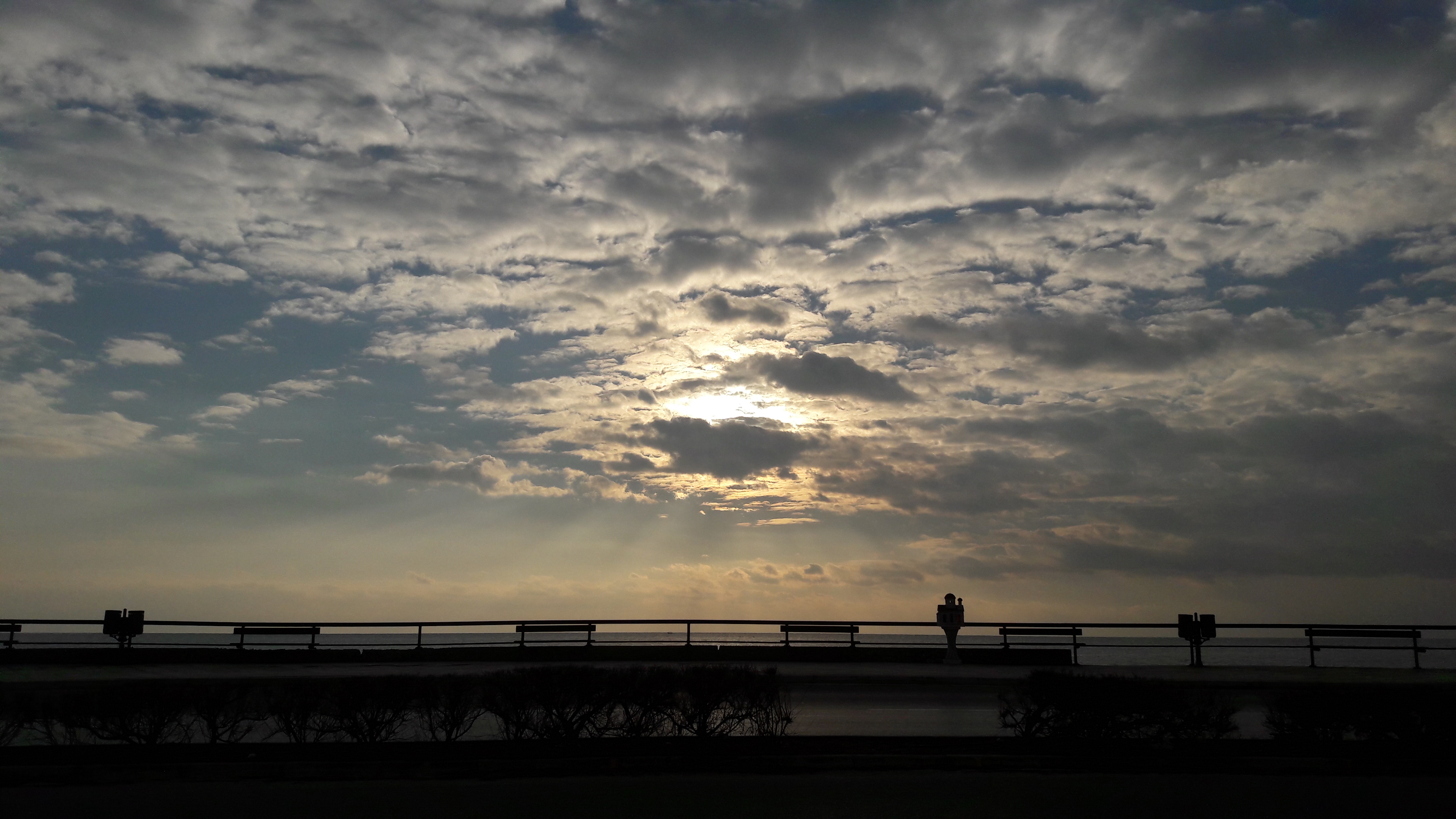
Sunset on the coastal street of Alexandroupolis

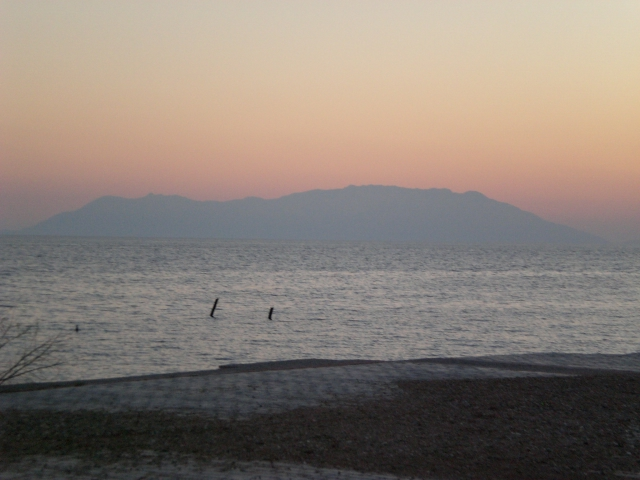
View of Samothrace from the city

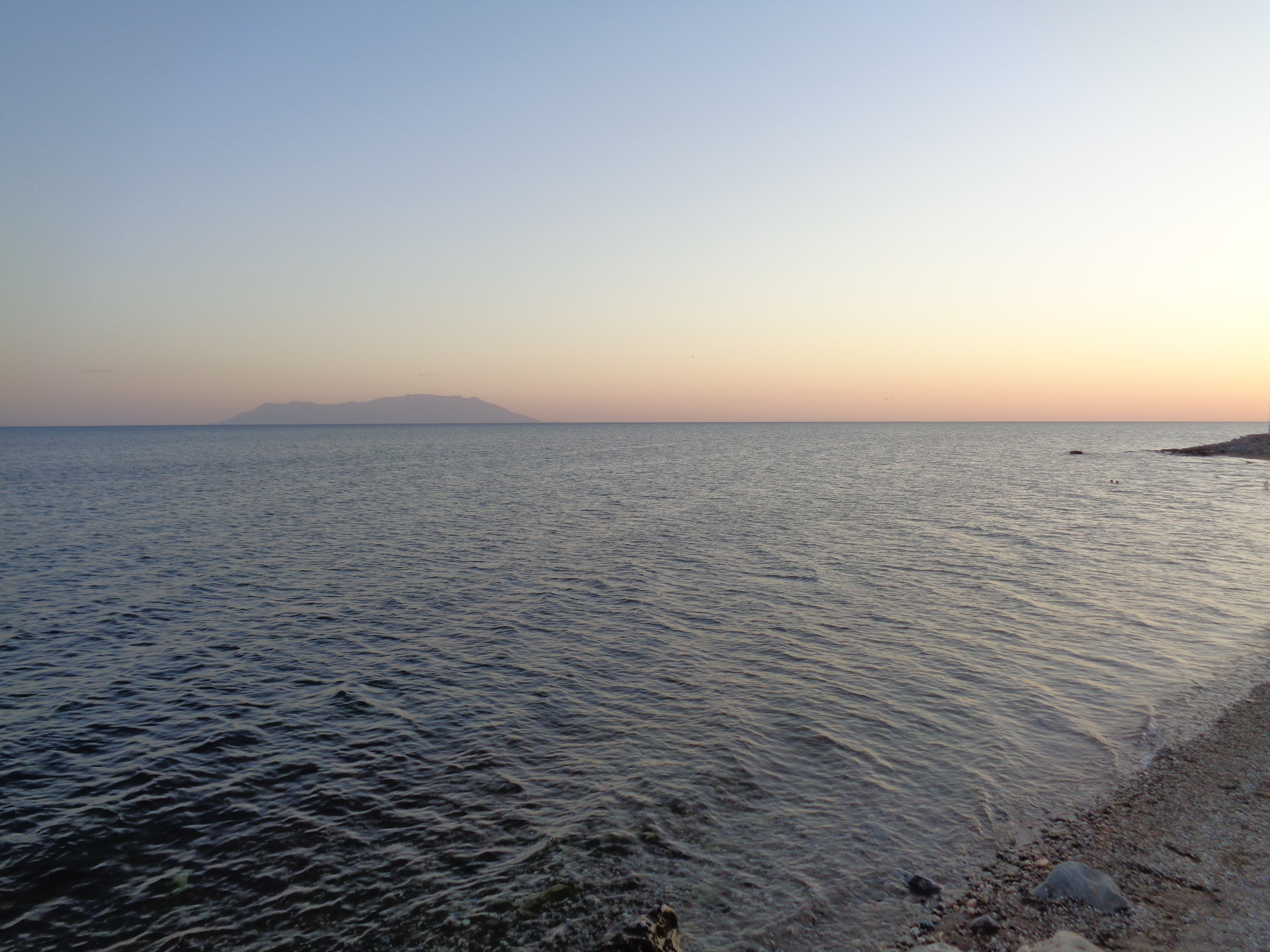
Sunset with Samothrace view

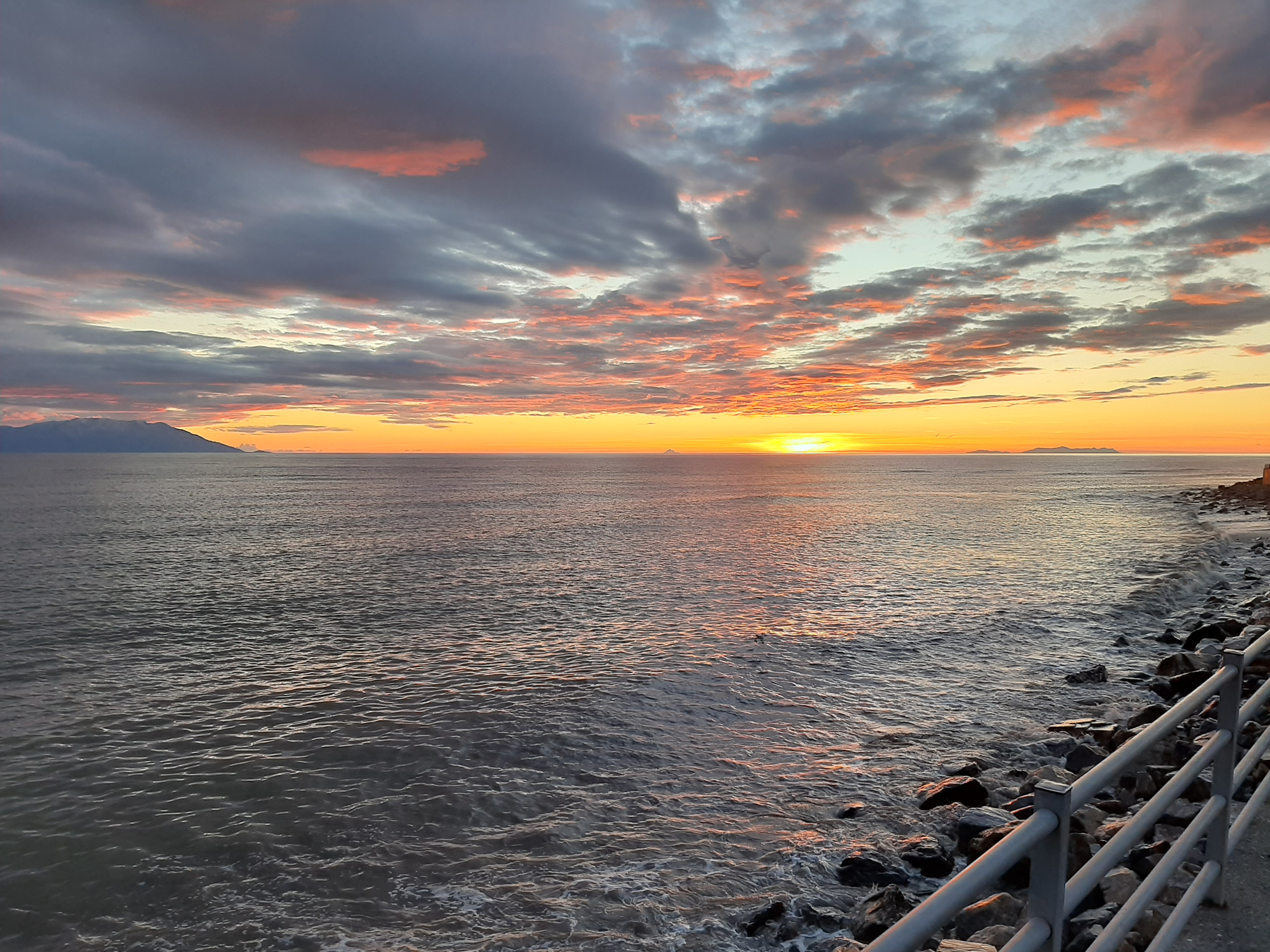
Sunset in Alexandroupolis

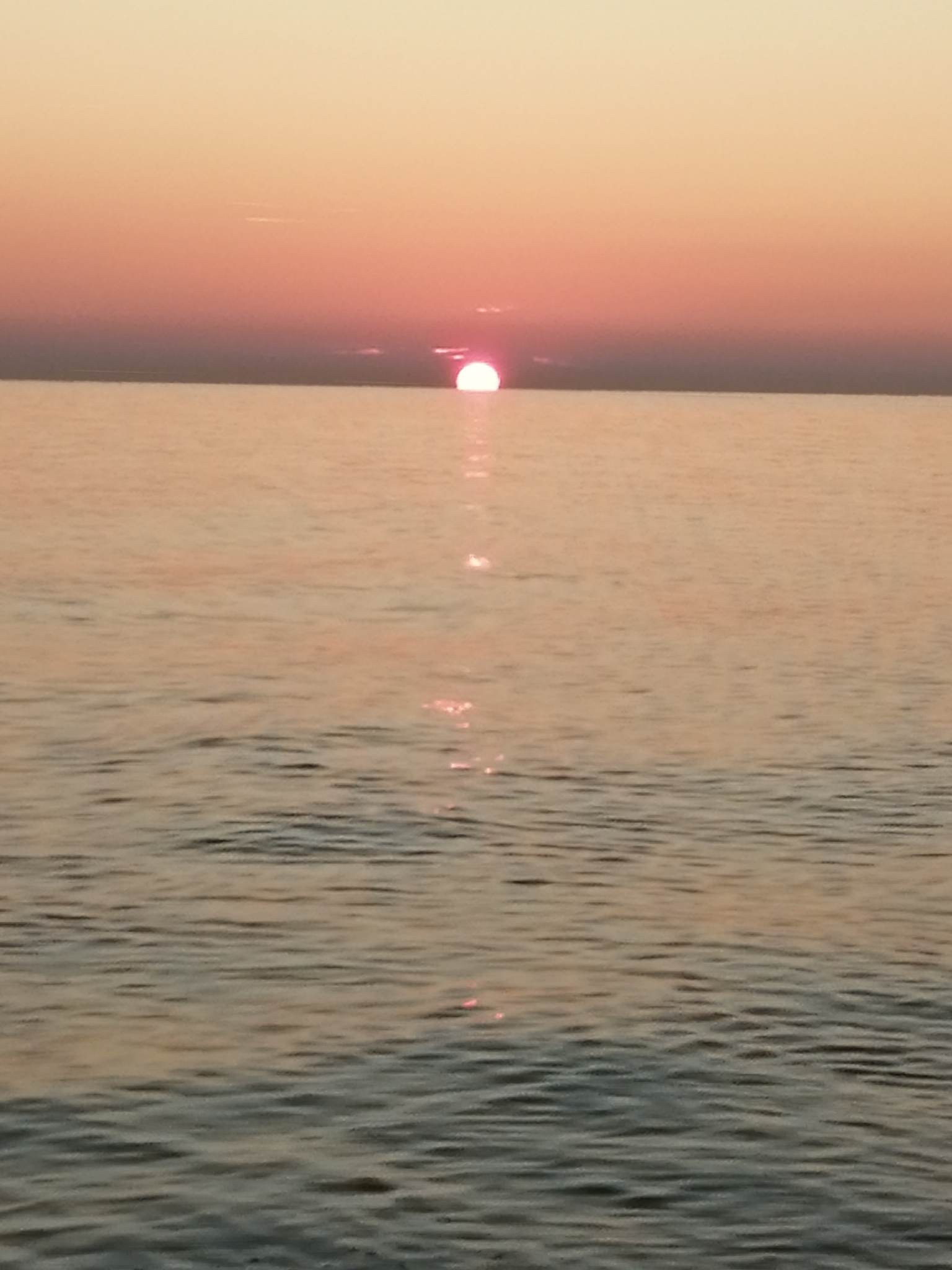
Sunset in Alexandroupolis

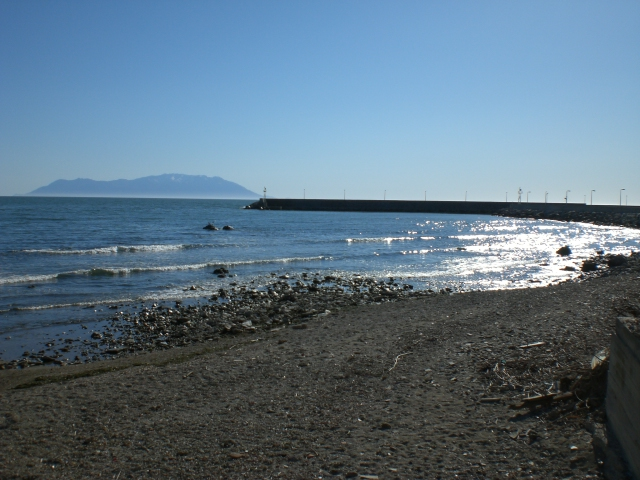
View of Samothrace from a coastline in Makri

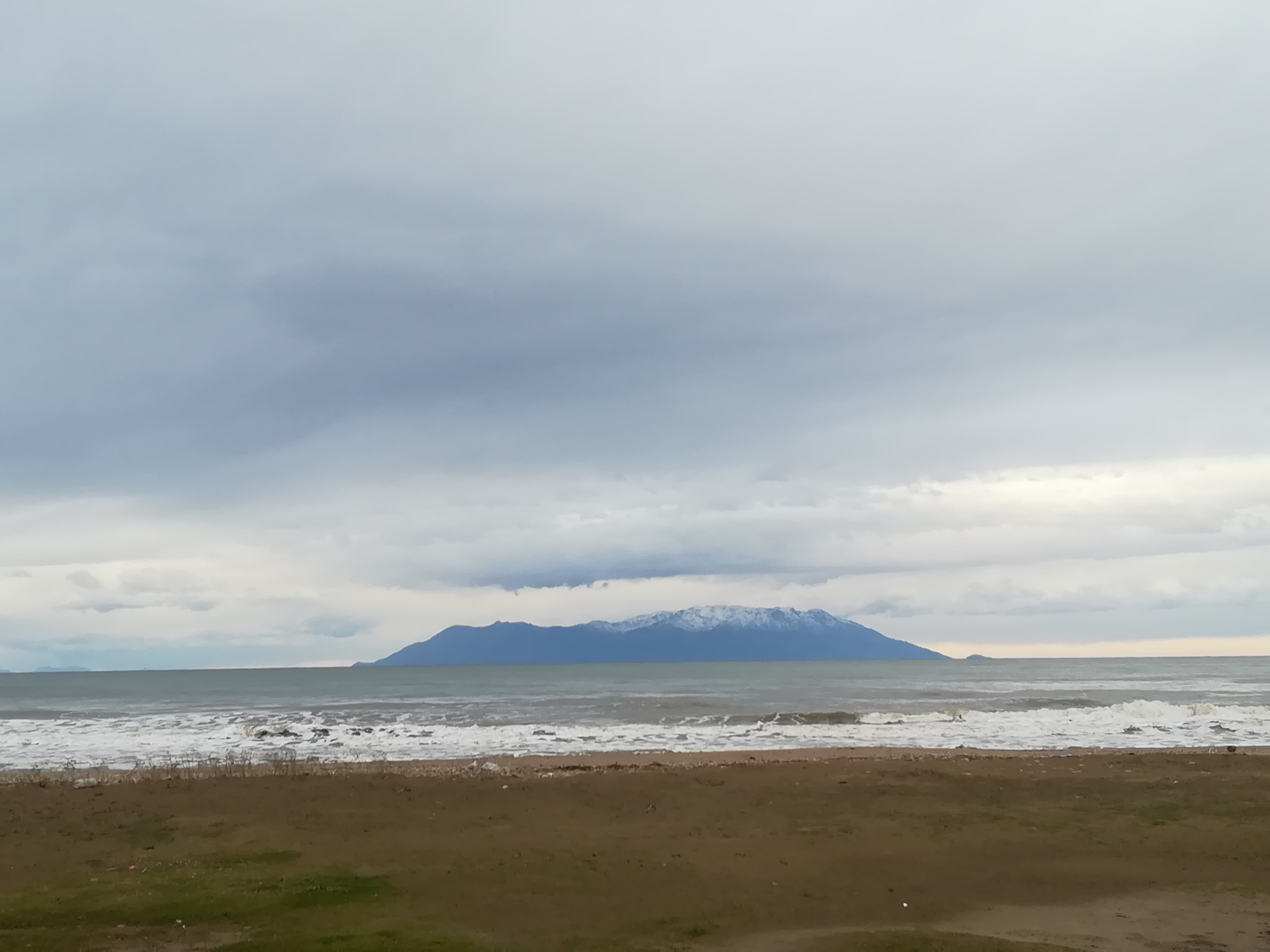
View of snowy Samothrace from a beach in Alexandroupolis

Coast along Alexandroupolis

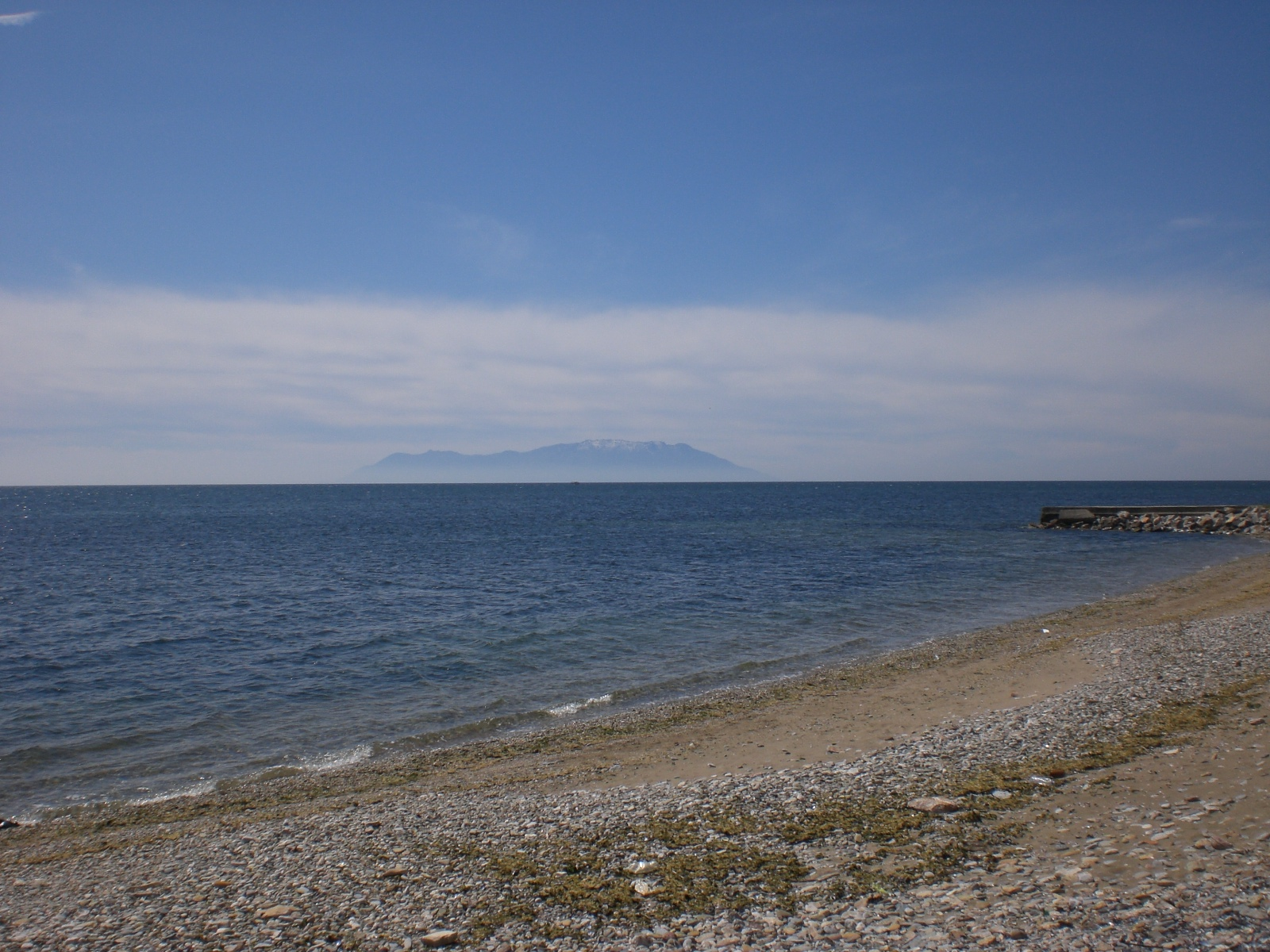
Beach with view to Samothrace

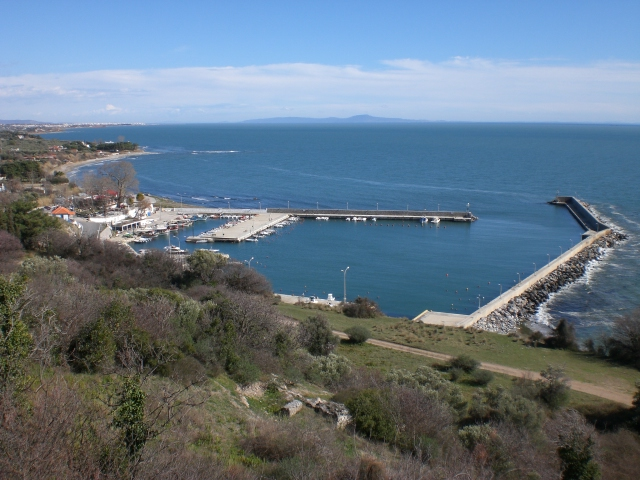
The small harbour of Makri

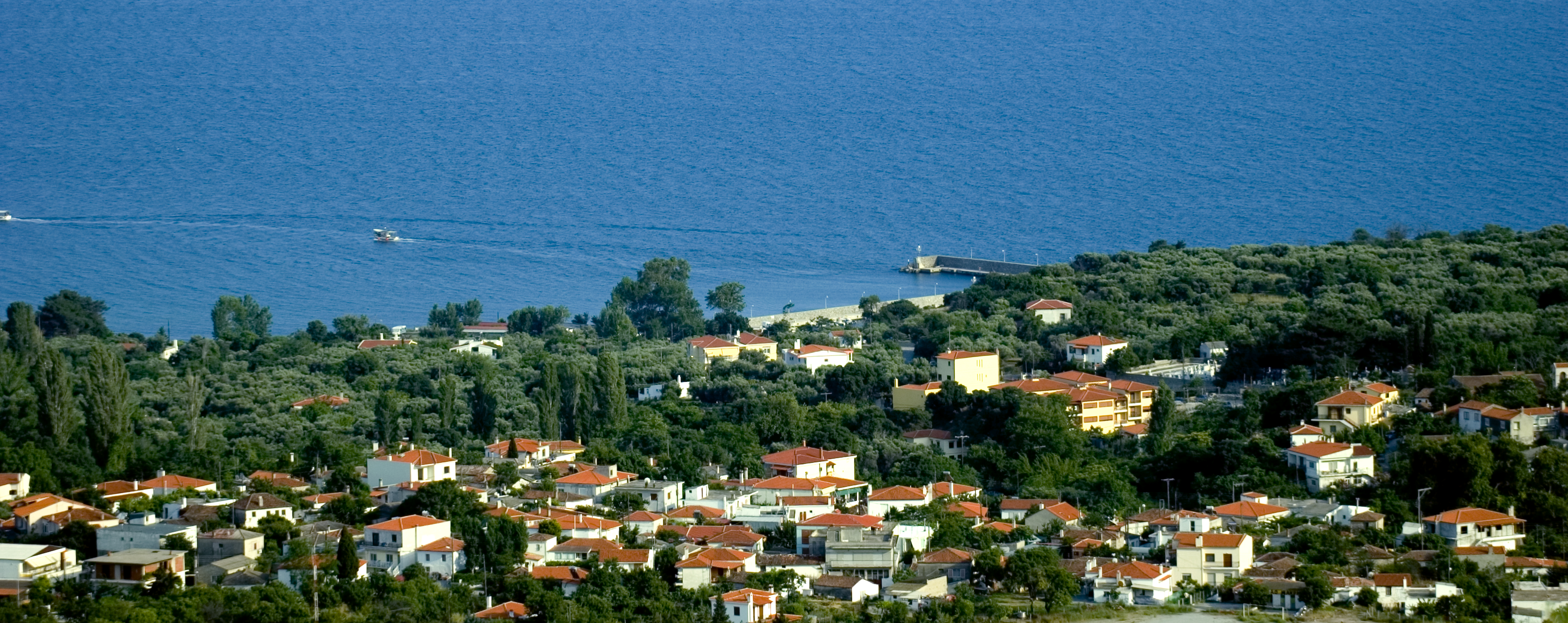
The village of Makri

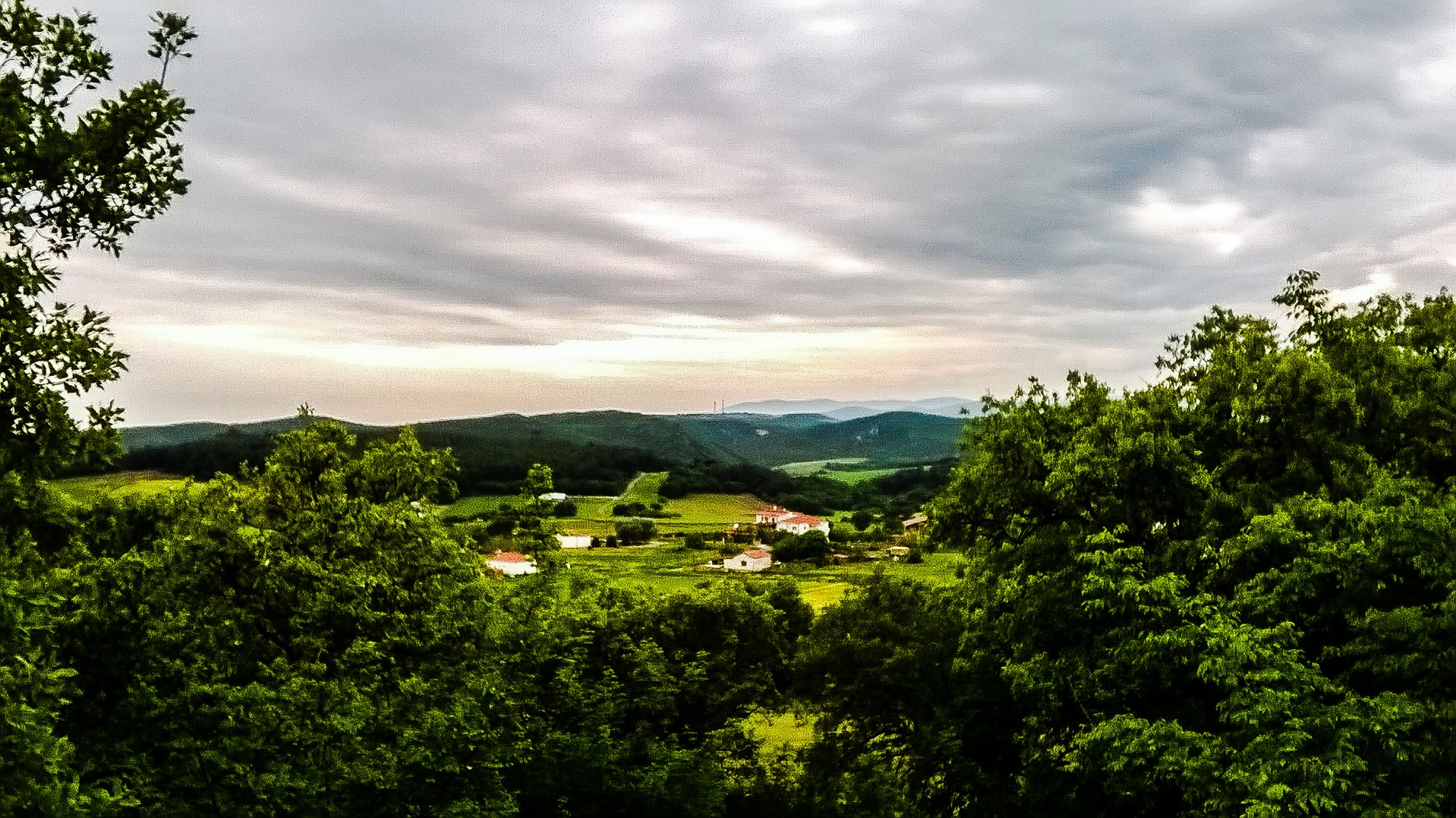
Mountainous landscape in Aetochori

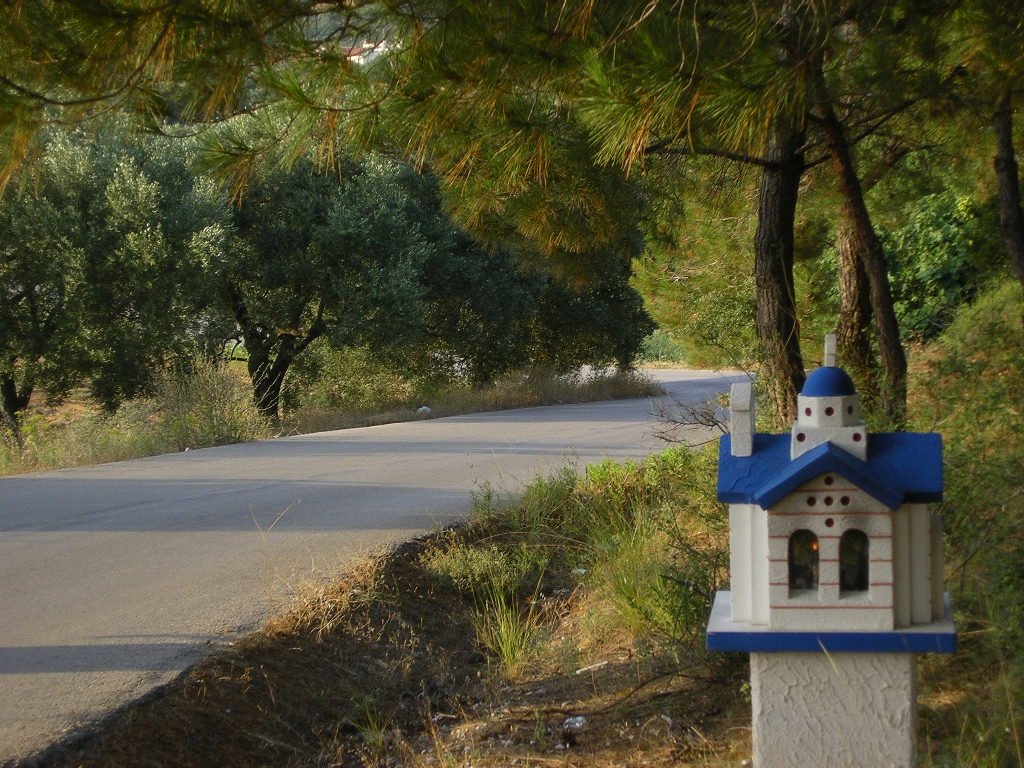
Road with small church near Dikella

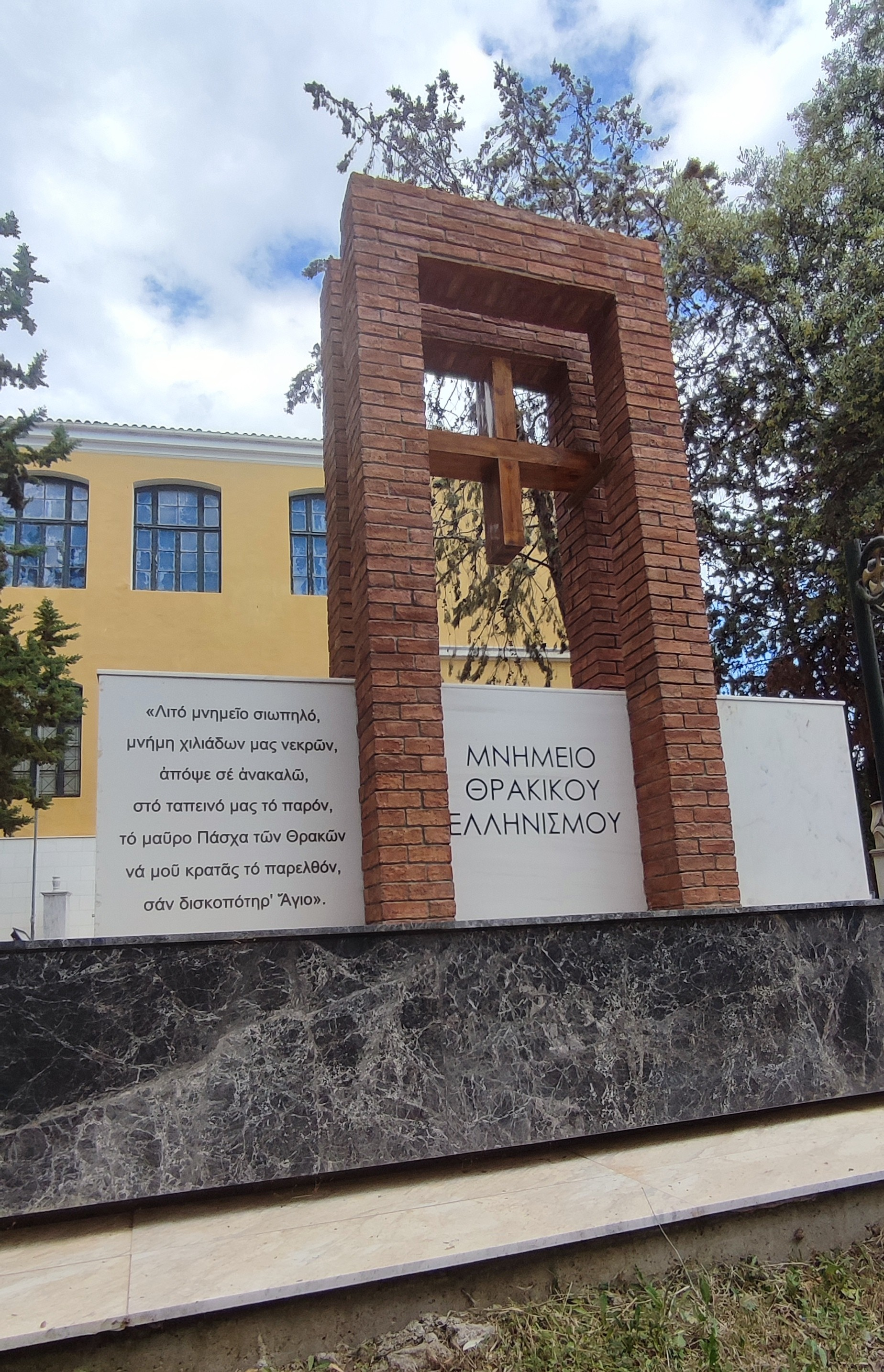
Monument for Thracian Hellenism in the yard of the metropolitan church

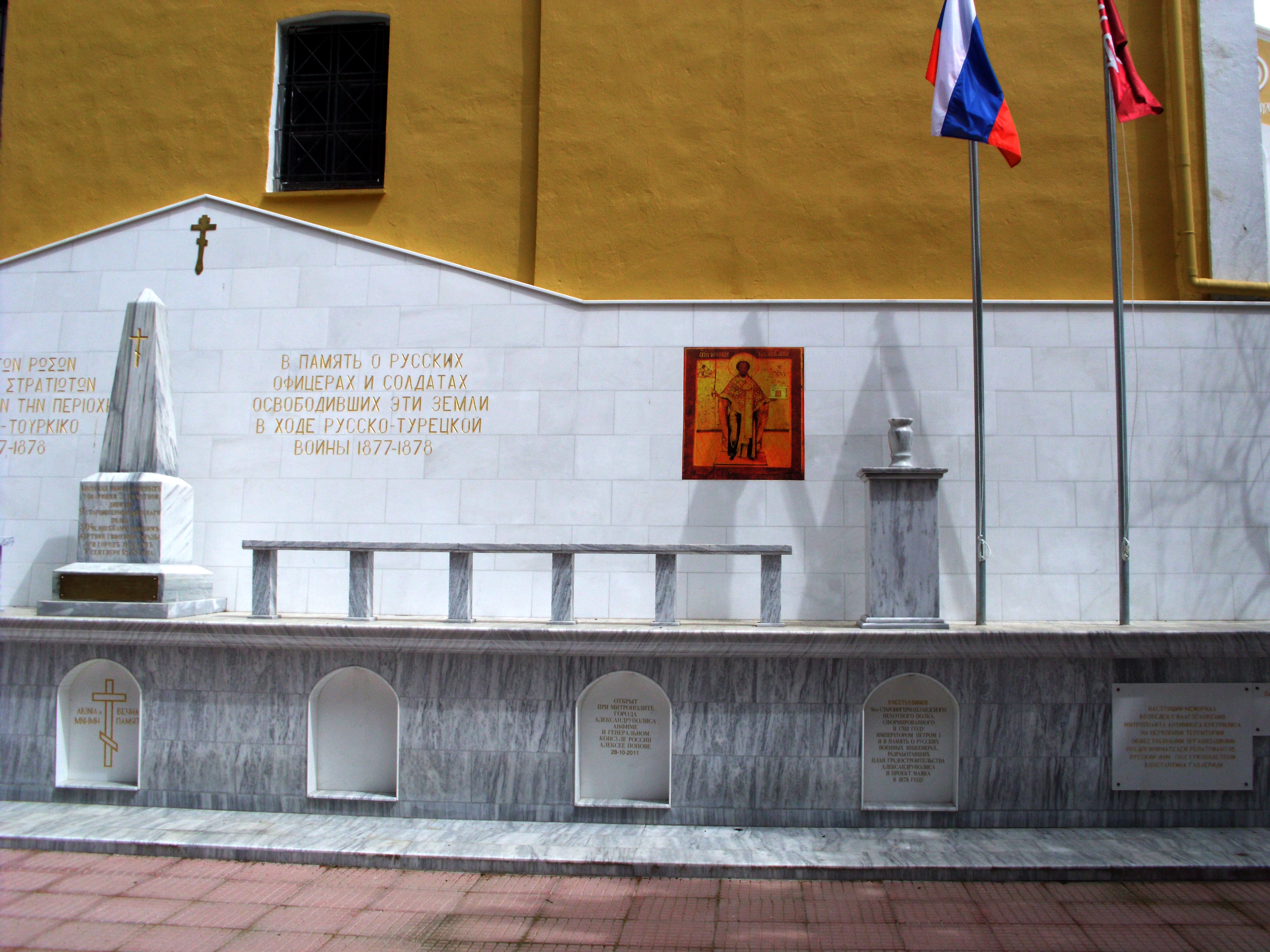
Russian monument in the yard of the metropolitan church for the Russo-Turkish War (1877–1878)

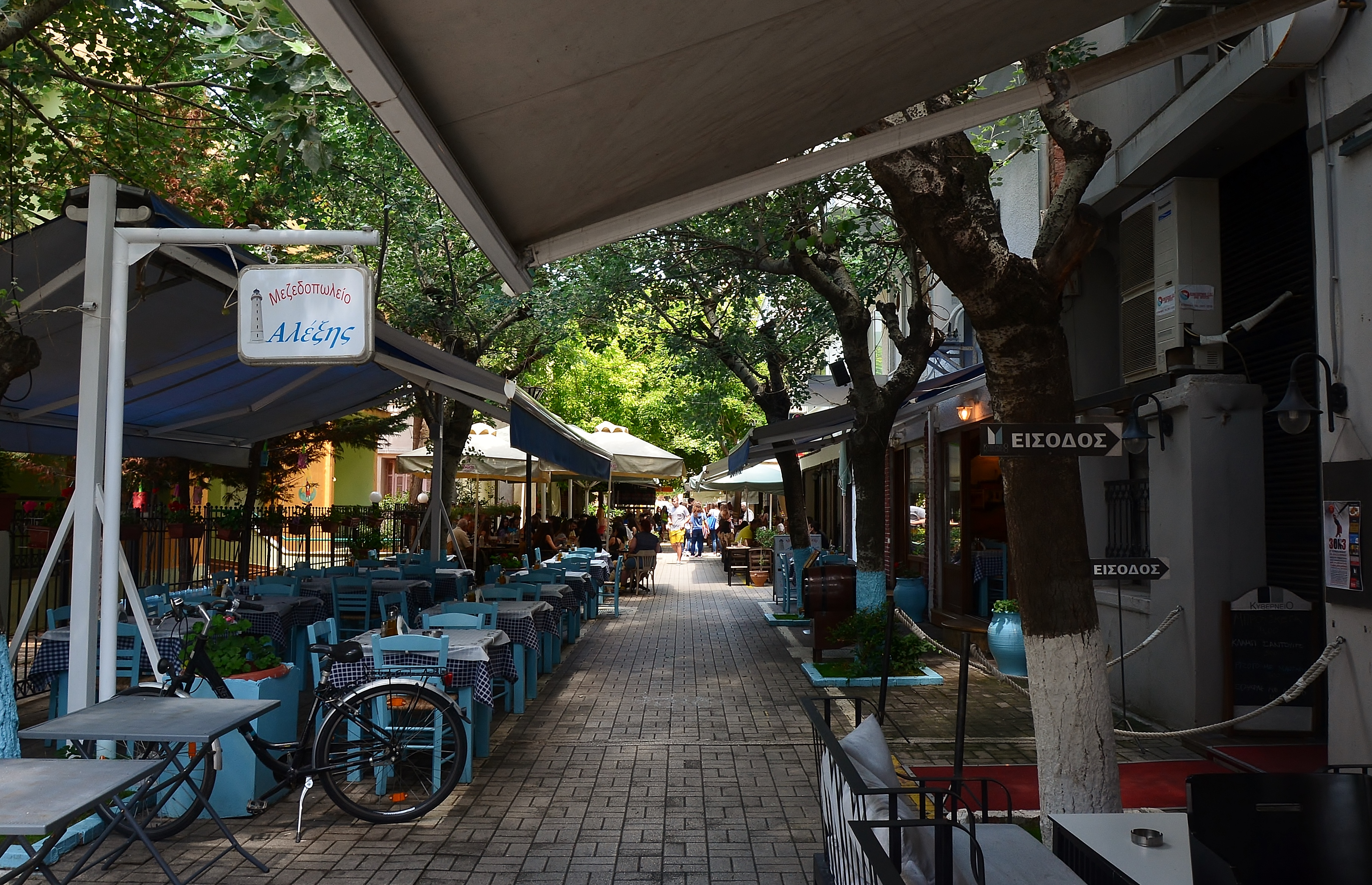
Pedestrian area in Alexandroupolis

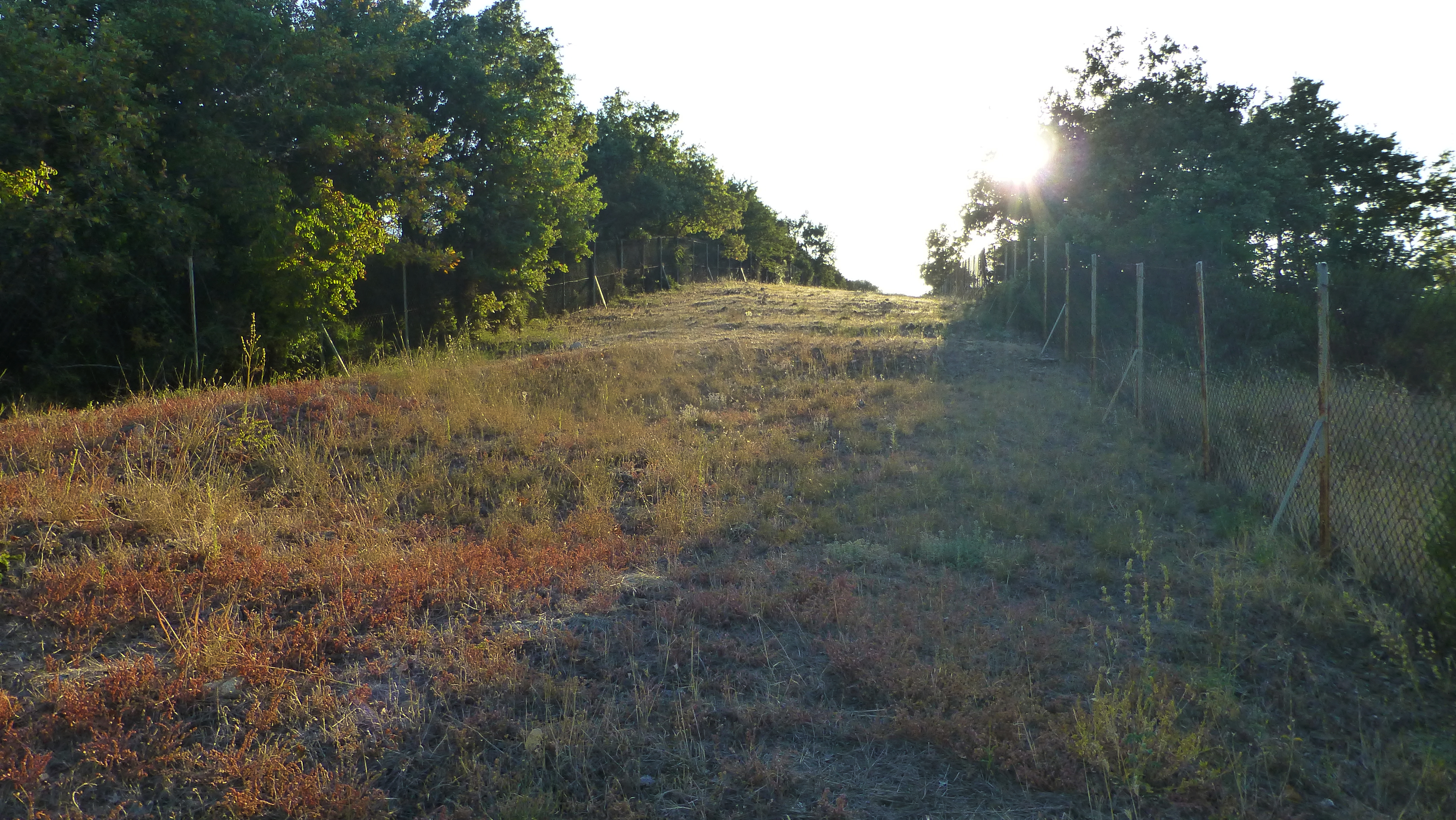
Via Egnatia in Traianoupoli, near Alexandroupolis

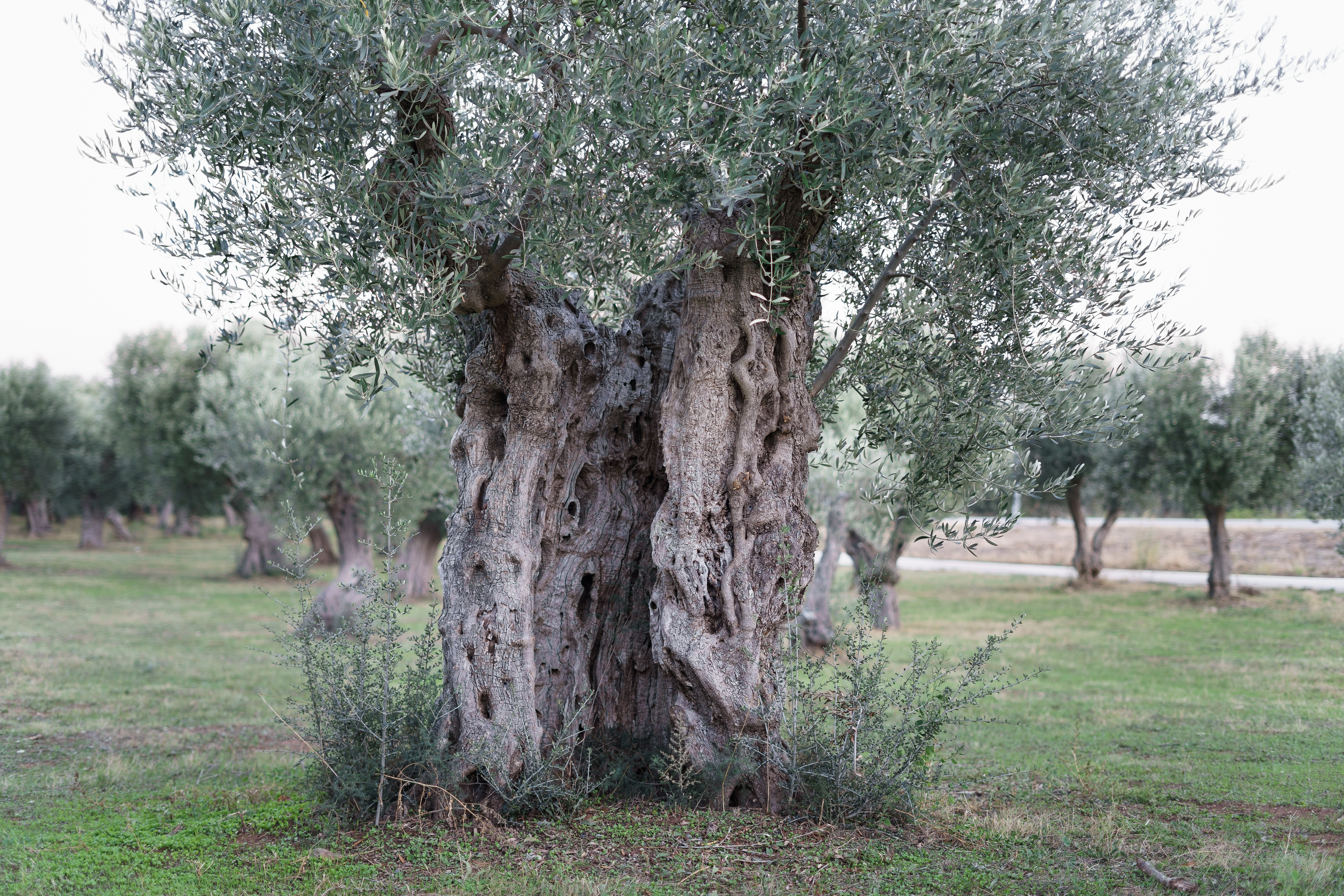
Centuries-old olive grove in Alexandroupolis

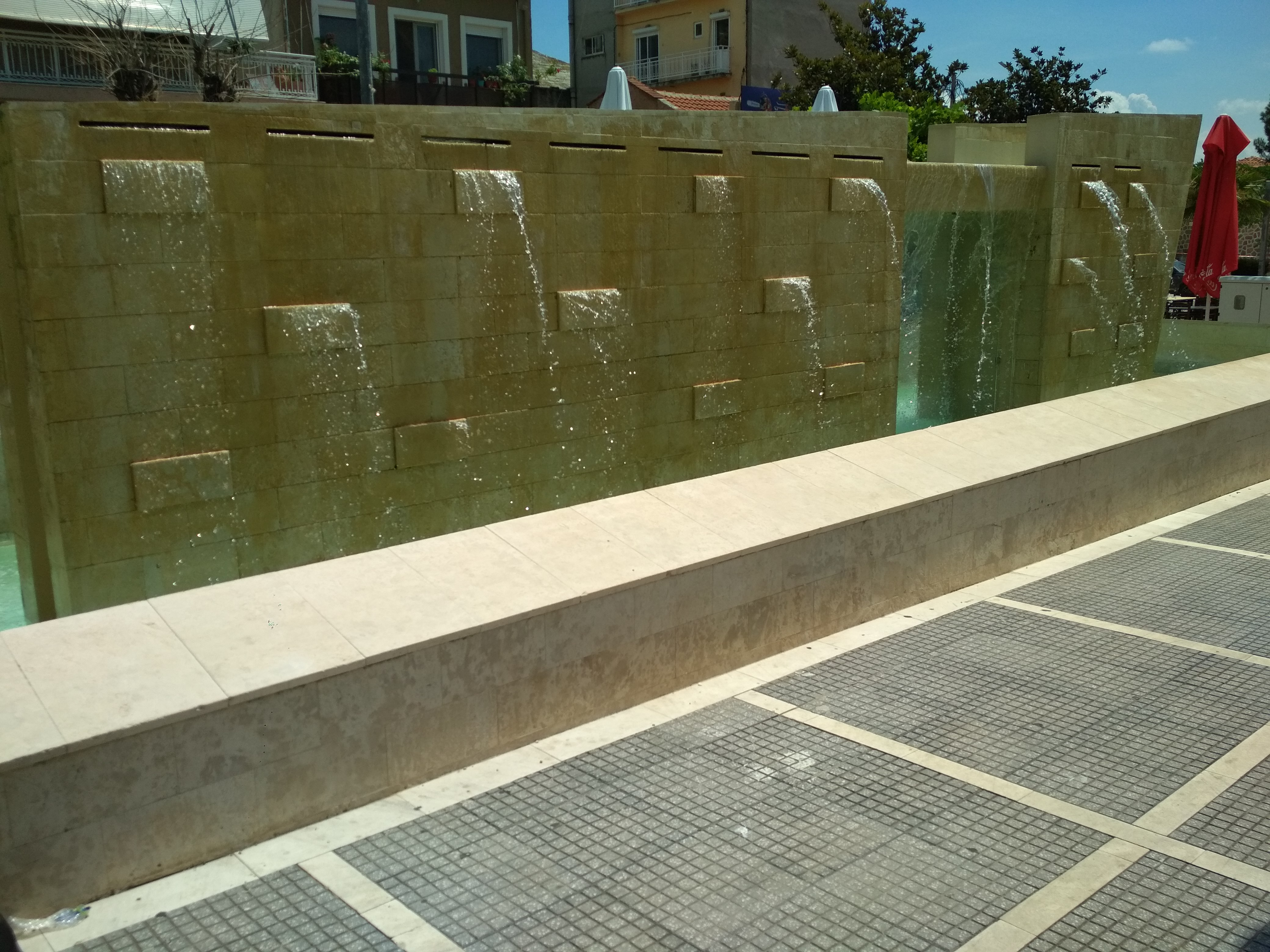
Eleftherias Square

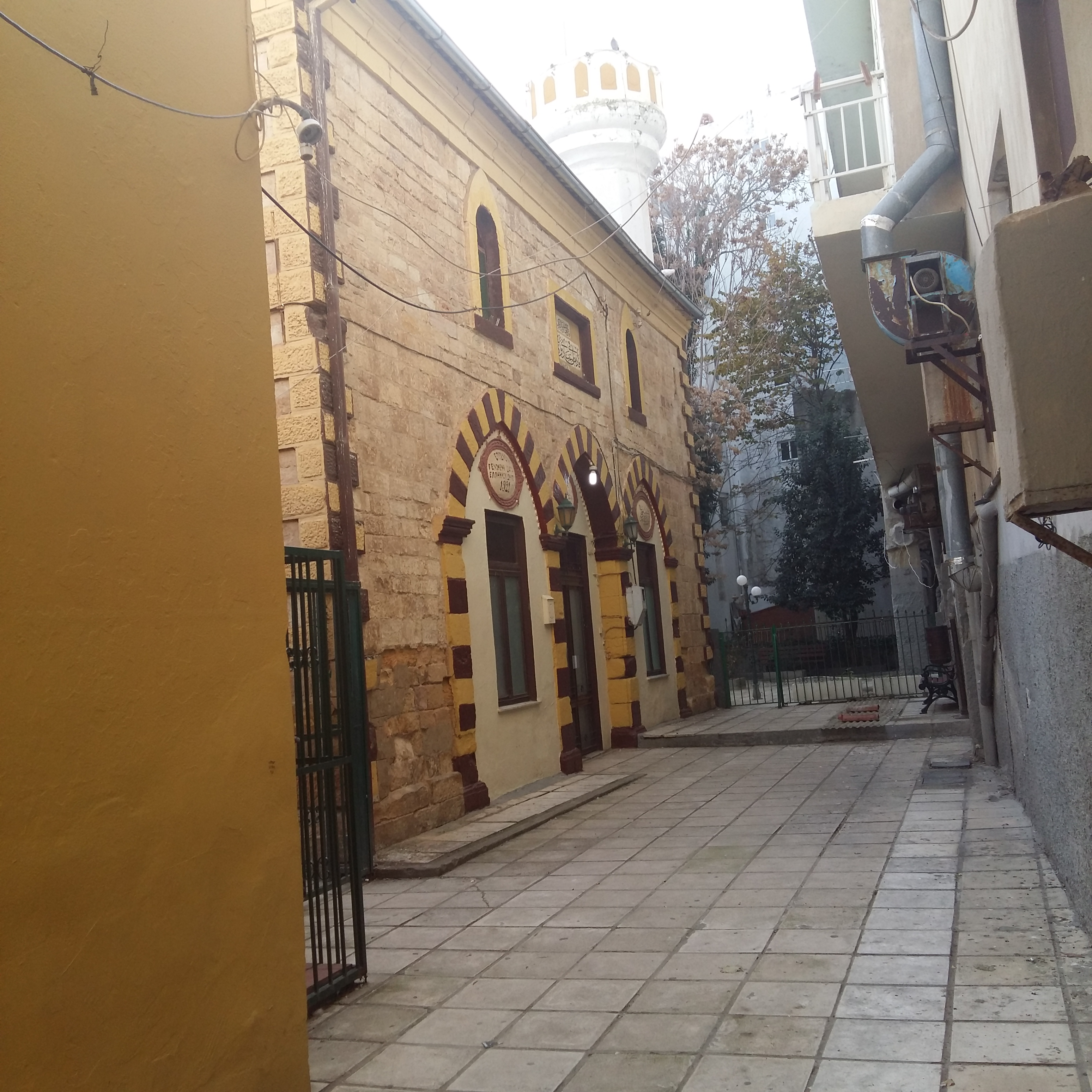
Alexandroupolis Mosque

== See also ==
- Burgas-Alexandroupoli pipeline
- List of settlements in the Evros regional unit
- Ethnikos Alexandroupolis
- Alexandroupolis Airport
- Eastern Thrace
- Northern Thrace
- Evros
