= List of settlements in the Arta regional unit =

This is a list of settlements in the Arta regional unit, Greece.

- Agia Paraskevi
- Agios Spyridonas
- Agnanta
- Akropotamia
- Ammotopos
- Anemorrachi
- Aneza
- Ano Kalentini
- Arta
- Astrochori
- Athamanio
- Chalkiades
- Dafnoti
- Diasello
- Dichomoiri
- Dimari
- Distrato
- Elati
- Faneromeni
- Foteino
- Gavria
- Graikiko
- Grammenitsa
- Grimpovo
- Kalamia
- Kalogeriko
- Kalovatos
- Kampi
- Kapsala
- Kastania
- Katarraktis
- Kato Athamanio
- Kato Kalentini
- Kentriko
- Keramates
- Kirkizates
- Kleidi
- Kommeno
- Kompoti
- Korfovouni
- Koronisia
- Kostakioi
- Koukkoulia
- Ktistades
- Kypseli
- Lepiana
- Limini
- Loutrotopos
- Markiniada
- Megalochari
- Megarchi
- Melissourgoi
- Mesopyrgos
- Mesounta
- Mikrospilia
- Miliana
- Neochori
- Pachykalamos
- Palaiokatouna
- Pantanassa
- Peranthi
- Peta
- Petra
- Piges
- Pistiana
- Polydroso
- Psathotopi
- Rachi
- Ramia
- Retsiana
- Rodavgi
- Rokka
- Sellades
- Skoulikaria
- Skoupa
- Strongyli
- Sykies
- Tetrakomo
- Theodoriana
- Velentziko
- Vigla
- Vlacherna
- Vourgareli

== See also ==
- List of towns and villages of Greece
