= Foteino, Arta =

Foteino Φωτεινό
- Community
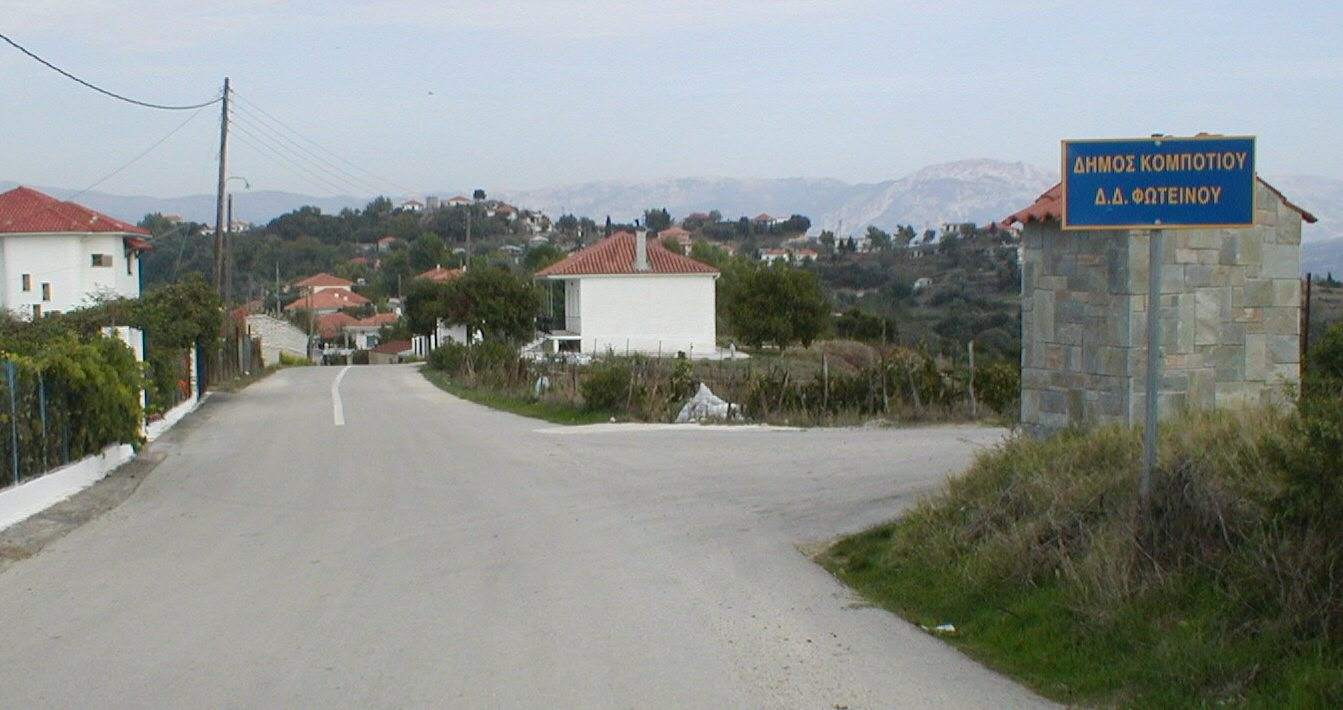

- Location within Greece
- Coordinates: 39°8′4″N 21°6′27″E
- Country: Greece
- Administrative region: Epirus
- Regional unit: Arta
- Municipality: Nikolaos Skoufas
- Municipal unit: Kompoti

Area
  - Community: 8.953 km^{2} (3.457 sq mi)
- Elevation: 500 m (1,600 ft)

Population (2021)
  - Community: 165
  - Density: 18.4/km^{2} (47.7/sq mi)
- Time zone: UTC+2 (EET)
  - Summer (DST): UTC+3 (EEST)
- Postal code: 471 00
- Area code: 26810

Foteino (Greek: Φωτεινό []) is a village (community) in the municipal unit of Kompoti in the regional unit of Arta, Greece. In 2021 its population was 165.

== History ==
The old name of the village, Hósiana (Greek: Χώσιανα), appears for the first time in 1696, in a historic document in which the villages of Arta asked the Venetian Republic for protection from pirates.

In 1899, a new church was built by destroying a small old one, dating to the early 12th century

The village was constituted as a separate commune with the 186/10.08.1947 government gazette (ΦΕΚ). Until then it was part of the commune of Ano-Petra. With ΦΕΚ 195/23.07.1953, its name changed from Hosiana to Fotino, and with law 2539/1997, as part of the Kapodistrias reforms, the commune became a municipal district of the municipality of Kompoti.

== Gallery ==
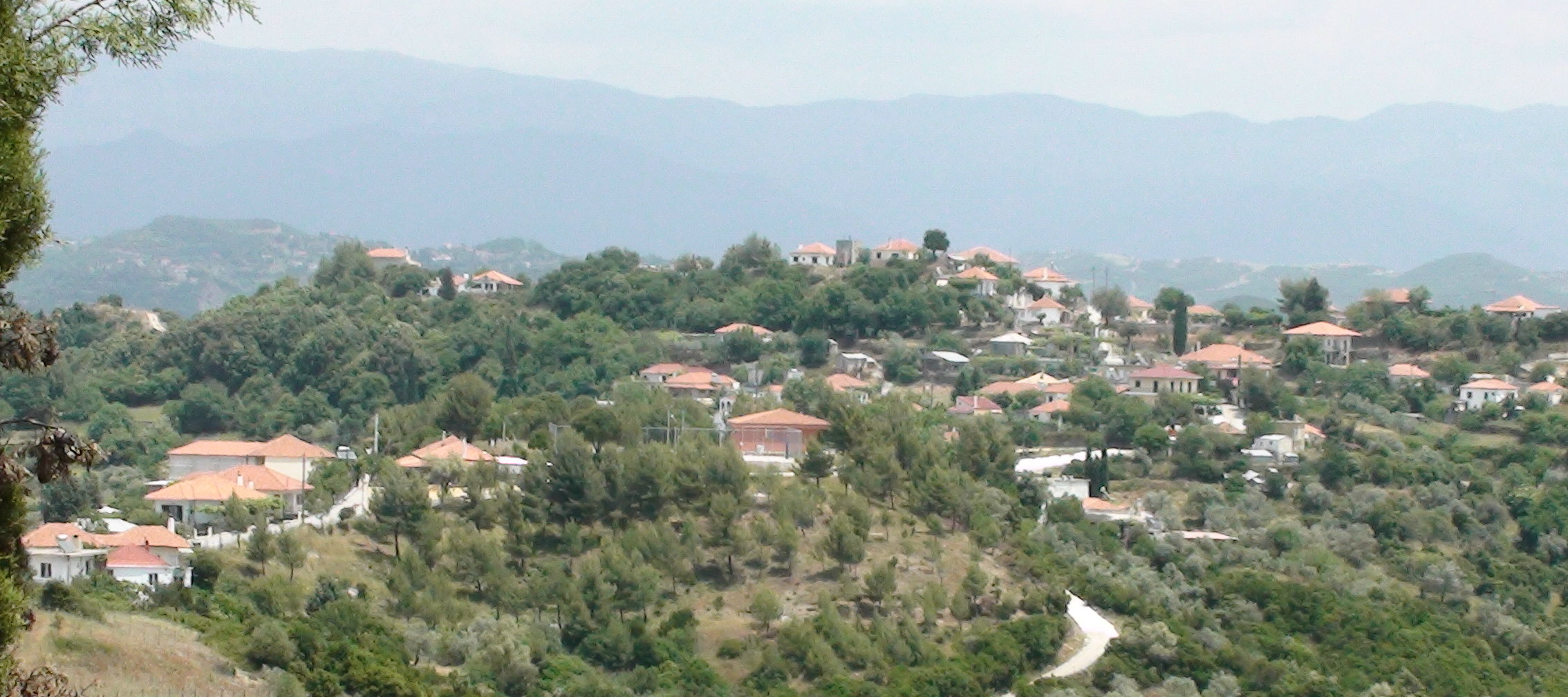
Fotino

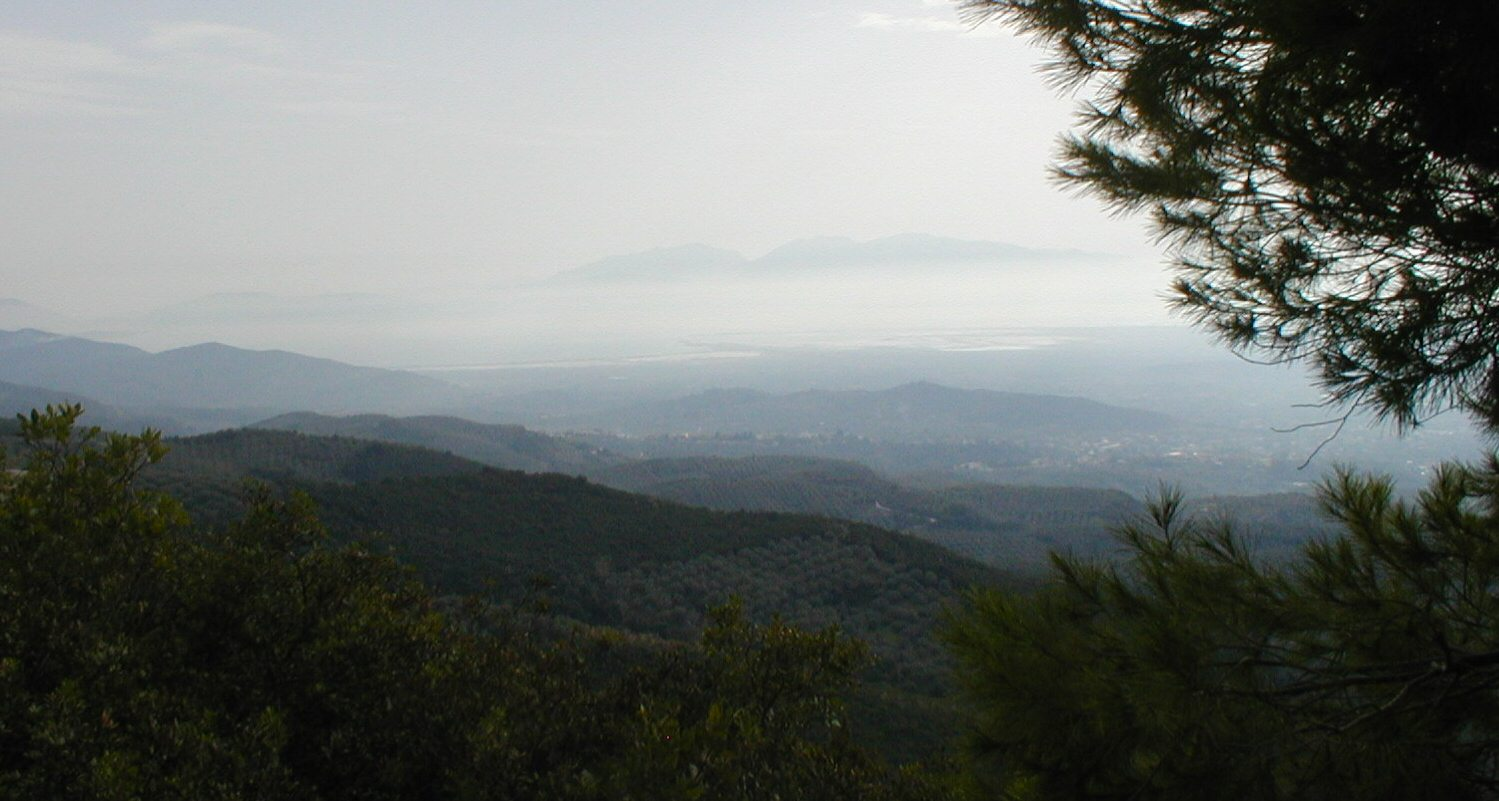
Fotino - Amvrakikos view

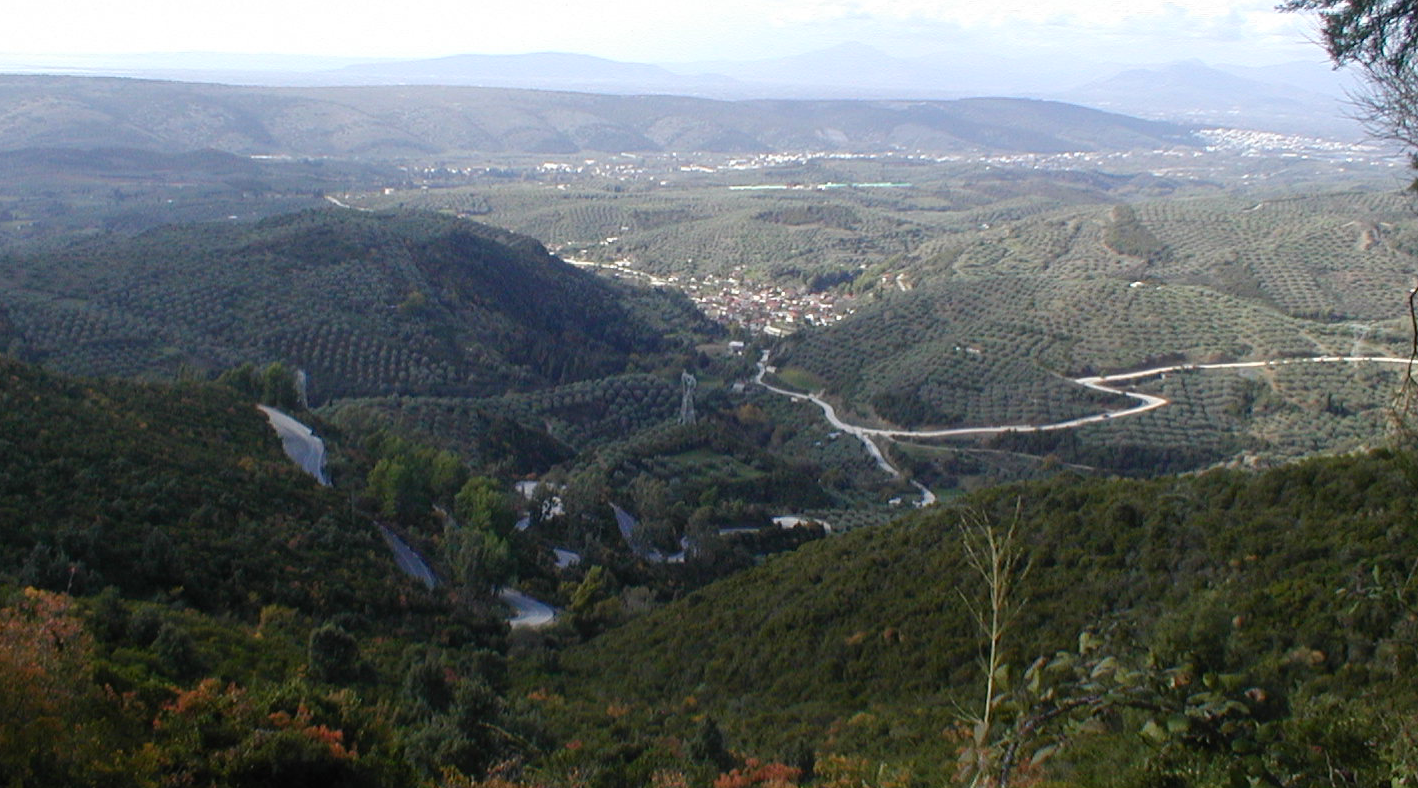
Fotino - Meyarhi View

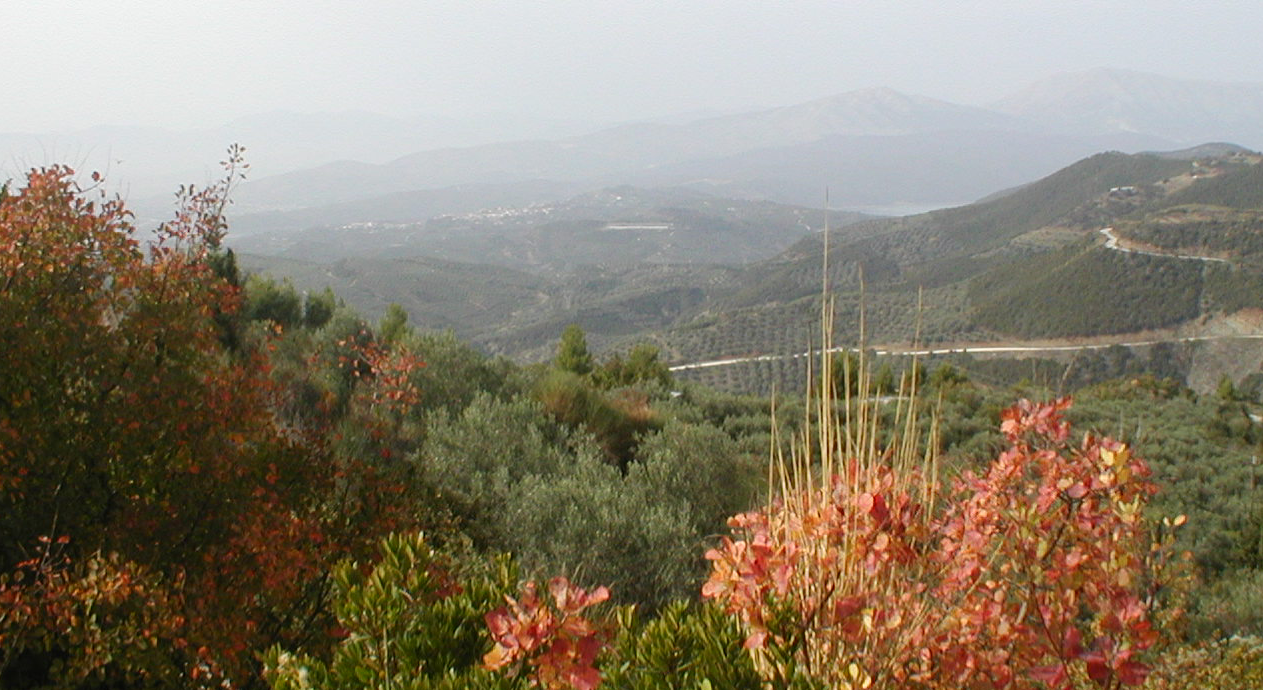
Fotino - Peta View - October

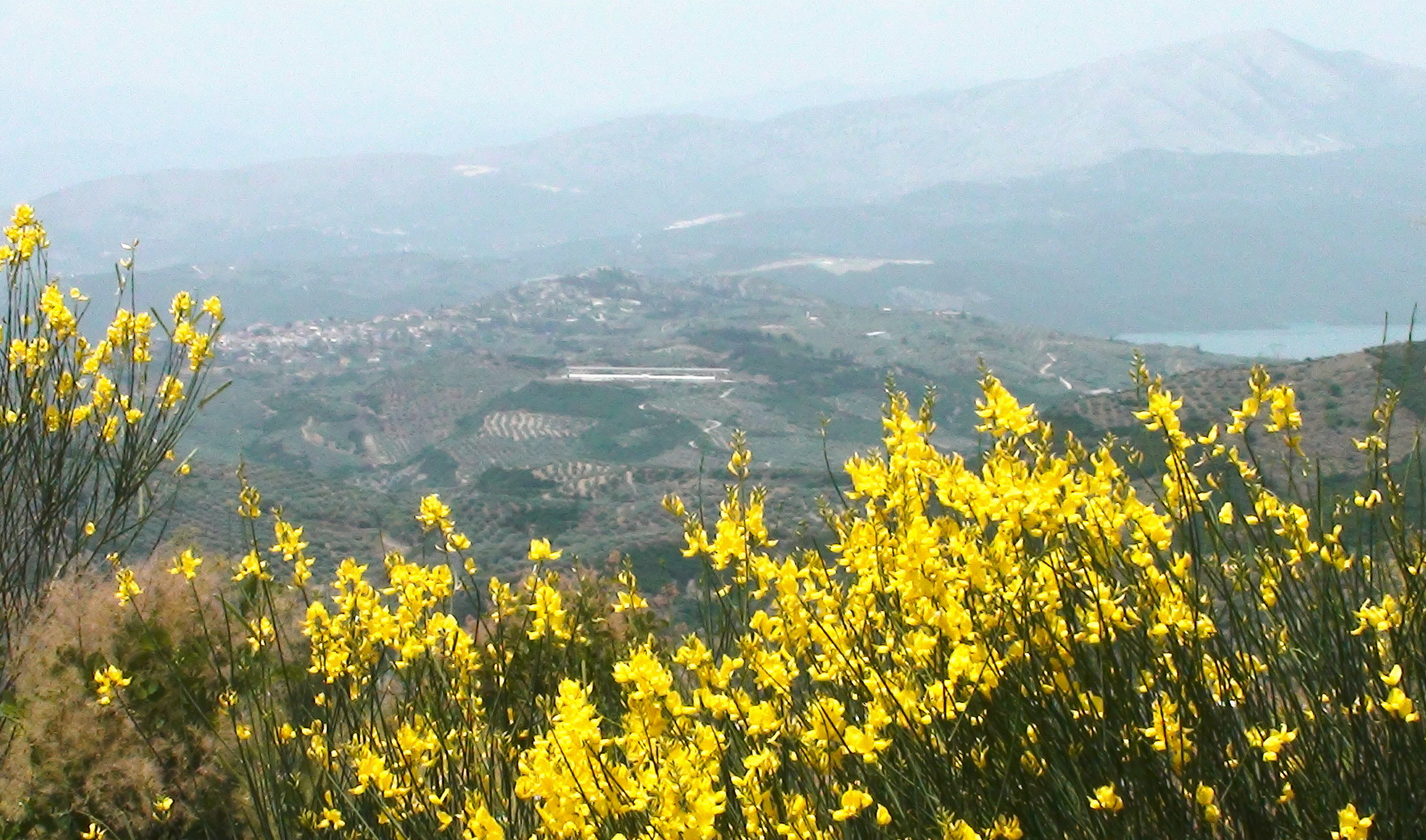
Fotino - Peta View - June

== See also ==
- Kompoti
- Sellades
- Menidi
- Ambracian Gulf
- Ionian Sea
- Arachthos River
