= Dimari =

Municipality settlement

Dimari Δημάρι
- Community
- Location within Greece
- Coordinates: 39°09′N 21°09′E
- Country: Greece
- Administrative region: Epirus
- Regional unit: Arta
- Municipality: Georgios Karaiskakis
- Municipal unit: Georgios Karaiskakis

Population (2021)
  - Community: 240
- Time zone: UTC+2 (EET)
  - Summer (DST): UTC+3 (EEST)

Dimari (Greek: Δημάρι) is a settlement in the municipality Georgios Karaiskakis, in the regional unit of Arta, Greece.

Dimari is located near the southern borders with the Regional Unit of Aetolia-Acarnania, west of the Valtou Mountains, at an altitude of 600 meters. It is approximately 28 kilometers east of Arta and 27 kilometers south of Ano Kalentini.
