= Gavria, Arta =

Gavria Γαβριά
- Community
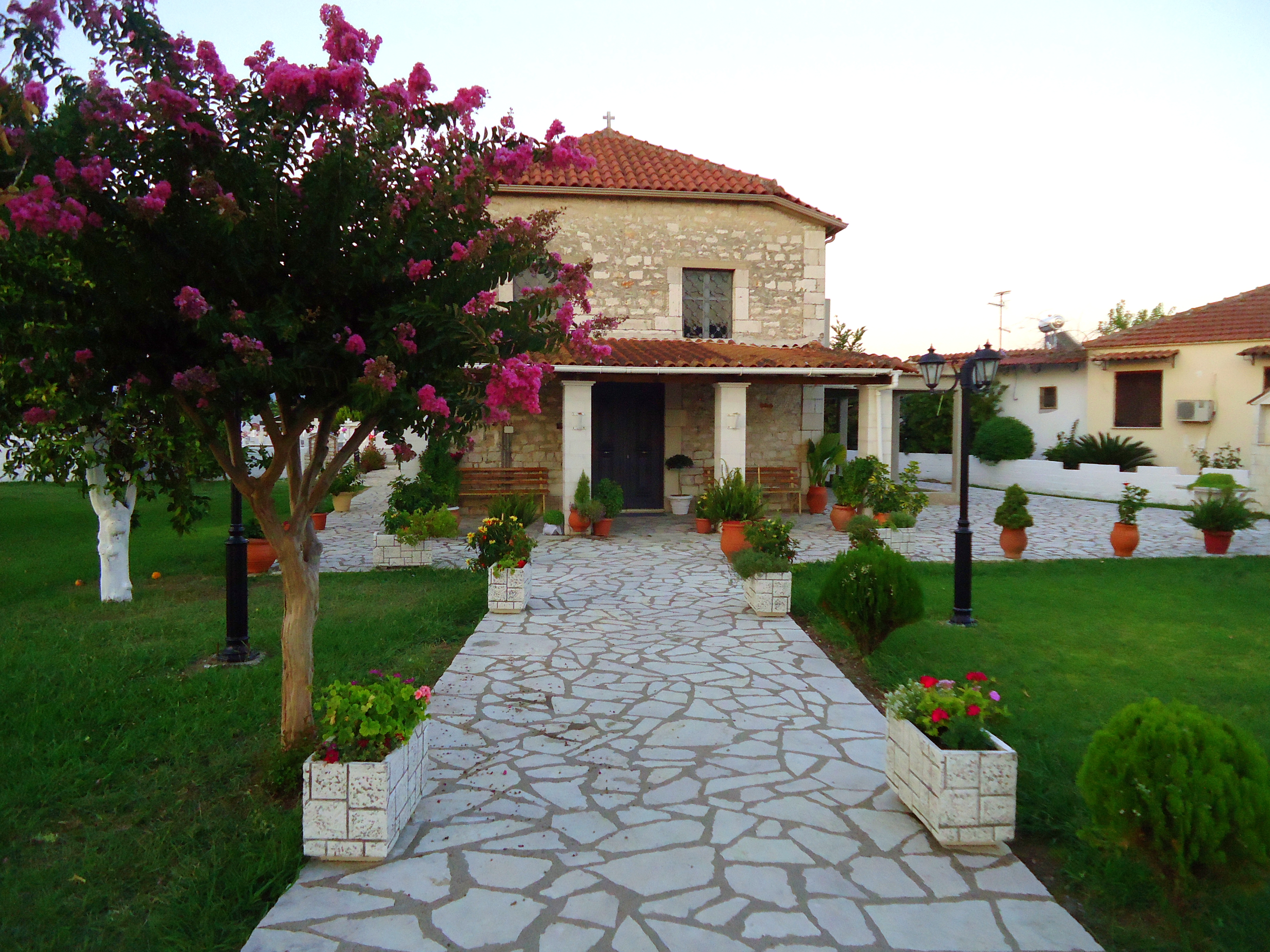

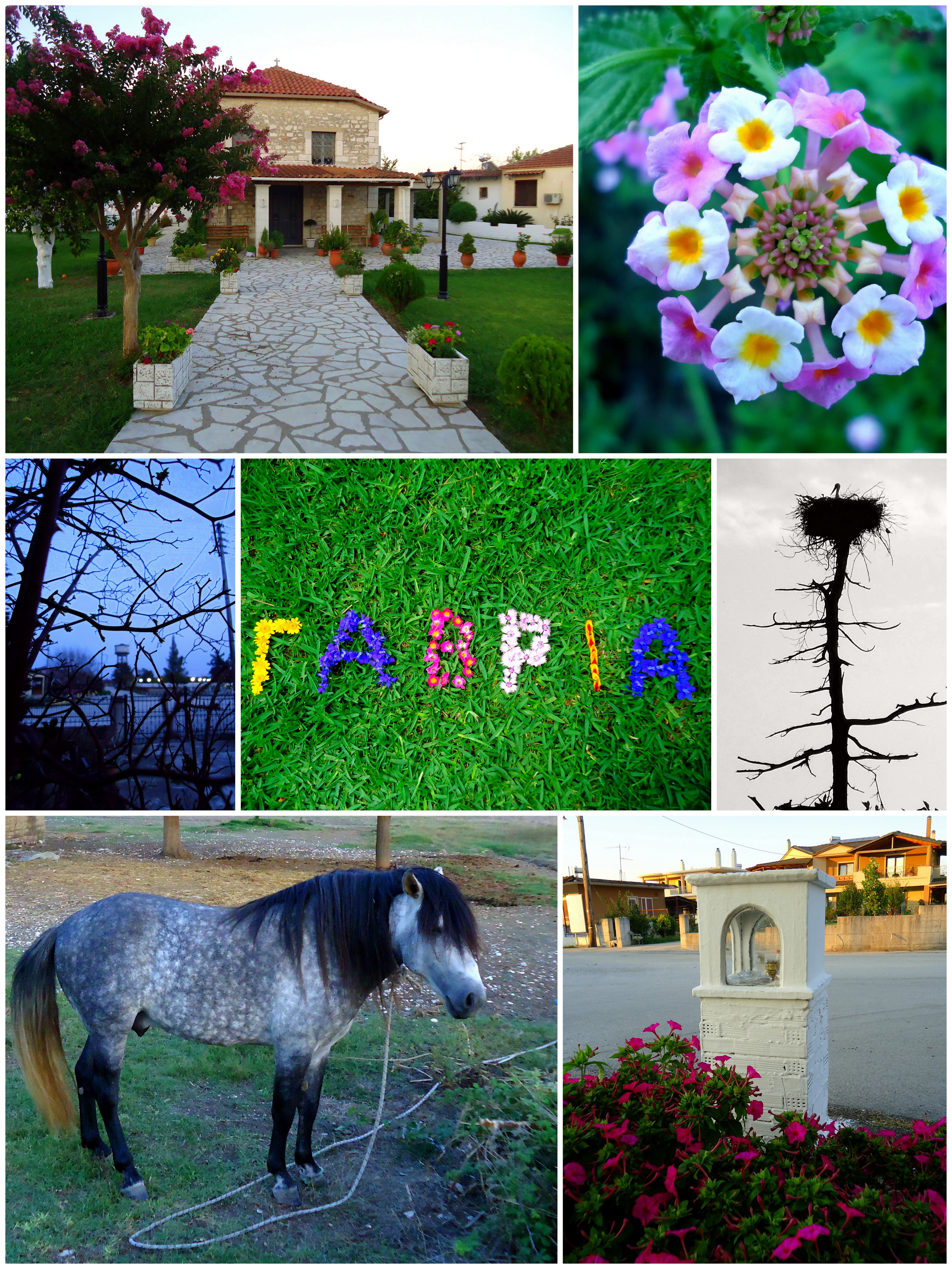
- Location within the regional unit

- Location within Greece
- Coordinates: 39°6′N 20°56′E
- Country: Greece
- Administrative region: Epirus
- Regional unit: Arta
- Municipality: Arta
- Municipal unit: Amvrakikos

Population (2021)
  - Community: 308
- Time zone: UTC+2 (EET)
  - Summer (DST): UTC+3 (EEST)
- Postal code: 47 100
- Area code: 26810
- Vehicle registration: ΑΤ

Gavria (Greek: Γαβριά) is a former community in the Arta regional unit, Epirus, Greece. Since the 2011 local government reform it is part of the municipality Arta, of which it is a community.

== Demographics ==
Historical population

Year	Pop.	±%
1895	82	—
1910	102	+24.4%
1913	184	+80.4%
1920	179	−2.7%
1928	219	+22.3%
1940	290	+32.4%
1951	371	+27.9%

Year	Pop.	±%
1961	436	+17.5%
1971	426	−2.3%
1981	425	−0.2%
1991	445	+4.7%
2001	386	−13.3%
2011	379	−1.8%
2021	308	−18.7%
