= Neochori, Arta =

Neochori Νεοχώρι
- Community
- Location within Greece
- Coordinates: 39°04′12″N 21°01′16″E
- Country: Greece
- Administrative region: Epirus
- Regional unit: Arta
- Municipality: Nikolaos Skoufas
- Municipal unit: Arachthos

Area
  - Community: 32.225 km^{2} (12.442 sq mi)
- Elevation: 10 m (33 ft)

Population (2021)
  - Community: 1,372
  - Density: 42.58/km^{2} (110.3/sq mi)
- Time zone: UTC+2 (EET)
  - Summer (DST): UTC+3 (EEST)

Neochori (Greek: Νεοχώρι) is a village in the Arta regional unit, Epirus, Greece. Situated on the right bank of the river Arachthos, it was the seat of the former Arachthos municipality. The community has an area of 32.225 km^{2}. As of 2021, the town's population was 1,372.

== Notable people ==
- Konstantinos Papasiozos (b. 1961), politician.
- Lampros Vangelis (b. 1982), former footballer.
