= Vigla, Arta =

Village in Epirus, Greece

Vigla Βίγλα
- Community
- Location within Greece
- Coordinates: 39°05′01″N 20°51′53″E
- Country: Greece
- Administrative region: Epirus
- Regional unit: Arta
- Municipality: Arta
- Municipal unit: Amvrakikos

Population (2021)
  - Community: 368
- Time zone: UTC+2 (EET)
  - Summer (DST): UTC+3 (EEST)

Vigla (Greek: Βίγλα) is a village in the Arta regional unit of Greece, located on the northern shore of the Ambracian Gulf. It is split into two neighborhoods, Palia Vigla (Παλιά Βίγλα, Old Vigla) and Nea Vigla (Νέα Βίγλα, New Vigla). Nea Vigla was established as an extension of the existing village of Vigla in 1957 by Pontic Greeks, who were relocated there from the Kazakh SSR in Central Asia, where they had been transferred during the deportation of the Greeks of the Soviet Union. It is the only notable Pontic Greek community in all of the Arta regional unit.

== Administration ==
Vigla is a community of the municipal unit of Amvrakikos in the municipality of Arta. It is located near the western edge of the Arta regional unit, in the geographical and administrative region of Epirus.

== History ==
Vigla was ceded to Greece from the Ottoman Empire in 1881 after the Convention of Constantinople, along with the rest of what is now the Arta regional unit and most of Thessaly. It more than doubled in size in 1957, with the arrival of about 100 Pontic Greek families from what is now Kazakhstan in Central Asia, where they had been transferred during the deportation of the Greeks of the Soviet Union. They used to live in the southern European territories of the Soviet Union, from where they were expelled to Central Asia in the 1940s. Their subsequent transfer to Greece was done in cooperation with the United Nations. The neighborhood established by the Pontic Greeks was named Nea Vigla, which translates to New Vigla, while the original settlement became known as Palia Vigla, which translates to Old Vigla.

On 15 March 1985, a mass shooting took place in Palia Vigla resulting in the death of six people. The perpetrator was a drunk local enraged by a personal dispute.

== Historical population ==
The village recorded its highest population in the 1961 census, shortly after the move of the Pontic Greeks into the village, having a total population of 652 at that time. Since then it has been in a slow but steady decline. In the most recent census in 2021, it had a population of 368, while in the previous one in 2011 the population was 382.

The following diagram presents data from as early as 1920:

Historical population

Year	Pop.	±%
1920	111	—
1928	171	+54.1%
1940	238	+39.2%
1951	253	+6.3%

Year	Pop.	±%
1961	652	+157.7%
1971	603	−7.5%
1981	513	−14.9%
1991	441	−14.0%

Year	Pop.	±%
2001	405	−8.2%
2011	382	−5.7%
2021	368	−3.7%

== Notable people ==
- Antonios Nikopolidis (born 1971), main goalkeeper for the Greece national football team during its win in the UEFA Euro 2004.
