= Menidi =

Menidi may refer to the following places in Greece:

- Menidi, Aetolia-Acarnania
- Menidi, an alternative name for Acharnes, Attica
