= Filothei (disambiguation) =

Filothei (Φιλοθέη) can refer to:

- Filothei, a municipality in the agglomeration of Athens, Greece
- Filothei, Arta, a municipal unit in the regional unit of Arta, Greece
- several smaller places in Greece
- Saint Philothei
