= Irakleia, Arta =

Irakleia Ηράκλεια
- Municipal unit
- Location within the regional unit

- Location within Greece
- Coordinates: 39°15′N 21°13′E
- Country: Greece
- Administrative region: Epirus
- Regional unit: Arta
- Municipality: Georgios Karaiskakis

Area
  - Municipal unit: 129.9 km^{2} (50.2 sq mi)

Population (2021)
  - Municipal unit: 1,052
  - Municipal unit density: 8.099/km^{2} (20.98/sq mi)
- Time zone: UTC+2 (EET)
  - Summer (DST): UTC+3 (EEST)
- Postal code: 470 44
- Vehicle registration: ΑΤ

Irakleia (Greek: Ηράκλεια) is a former municipality in the Arta regional unit, Epirus, Greece. Since the 2011 local government reform it is part of the municipality Georgios Karaiskakis, of which it is a municipal unit. The municipal unit has an area of 129.887 km^{2}. It had a population of 1,052 in 2021. The seat of the municipality was in Ano Kalentini.
