= Arachthos =

Arachthos Άραχθος
- Municipal unit
- Location within the regional unit

- Location within Greece
- Coordinates: 39°06′N 21°00′E
- Country: Greece
- Administrative region: Epirus
- Regional unit: Arta
- Municipality: Nikolaos Skoufas

Area
  - Municipal unit: 73.4 km^{2} (28.3 sq mi)

Population (2021)
  - Municipal unit: 3,836
  - Municipal unit density: 52.3/km^{2} (135/sq mi)
- Time zone: UTC+2 (EET)
  - Summer (DST): UTC+3 (EEST)
- Postal code: 470 41
- Vehicle registration: ΑΤ

Arachthos (Greek: Άραχθος) is a former municipality in the Arta regional unit, Epirus, Greece. Since the 2011 local government reform it is part of the municipality Nikolaos Skoufas, of which it is a municipal unit. The municipal unit has an area of 73.431 km^{2}. It is situated along the lower course of the river Arachthos, south of Arta. Population 3,836 (2021). The seat of the municipality was in Neochori.

Near Arachthos, there is the static inverter plant of HVDC Italy-Greece.
