= Limini =

Village in Greece

Limini Λιμίνη
- Community
- Location within Greece
- Coordinates: 39°07′N 21°02′E
- Country: Greece
- Administrative region: Epirus
- Regional unit: Arta
- Municipality: Arta
- Municipal unit: Arta

Population (2021)
  - Community: 293
- Time zone: UTC+2 (EET)
  - Summer (DST): UTC+3 (EEST)

Limini is a small village in northwestern Greece. It lies in the Epirus Region. It is located approximately 7 km outside Arta, where the ancient city of Ambracia once lay. In 2021, it had a population of 293.
