= Sellades =

Sellades Σελλάδες
- Community
- Location within Greece
- Coordinates: 39°6.5′N 21°4.7′E
- Country: Greece
- Administrative region: Epirus
- Regional unit: Arta
- Municipality: Nikolaos Skoufas
- Municipal unit: Kompoti

Population (2021)
  - Community: 582
- Time zone: UTC+2 (EET)
  - Summer (DST): UTC+3 (EEST)

Sellades (Greek: Σελλάδες) is a village and a community in the municipal unit of Kompoti in the regional unit of Arta, Greece. The community includes the village Alonia. Sellades is 1 km northwest of Kompoti and 10 km southeast of Arta. The Greek National Road 5/E951 (Antirrio - Agrinio - Arta - Ioannina) passes southwest of the village.

== Population ==
Year	Village population	Community population
1981	683	-
1991	718	-
2001	687	754
2011	606	714
2021	464	582

== History ==
The origin of the name "Sellades" is disputed. According to one theory the first inhabitants of the village were Selloi people from Dodona. Another theory states that the inhabitants were involved in manufacturing saddles ("sela"), or that the village is shaped like a saddle. Strabo described the area of Makrynoros as Selaida (Σελαΐδα). Another theory is that the first inhabitants had as their last name Selladitis (Σελλαδίτης).

The first written reference to the village is in a Venetian documents dating from 1696, saying that Sellades and the neighbouring village Megarchi paid tribute to the Venetians.
