= Makrynoros =

Greek Mountain Range

- Μακρυνόρος

Highest point
- Elevation: 900 m (3,000 ft)

Dimensions
- Length: 25 km (16 mi) N-S
- Width: 10 km (6.2 mi) E-W

Geography
- Country: Greece
- Region: Northern Aetolia-Acarnania
- Range coordinates: 39°05′N 21°12′E

Makrynoros (Greek: Μακρυνόρος) is a forested mountain range dominating the northern part of Aetolia-Acarnania in western Greece. Its highest elevation is about 900 m. Its length is approximately 25 to 30 km from north to south and its width is approximately 10 km from east to west. It lies to the east of the Ambracian Gulf, east of Menidi and northeast of Amfilochia. The valley of the small river Bizakos separates it from the higher Valtou mountains to the east. The Greek National Road 5 (Antirrio - Agrinio - Arta - Ioannina) passes west of the mountain range. Strabo described the area of the mountain range near Sellades as Selaida (Σελαΐδα).

== Nearest places ==
- Nea Malesiada, southeast
- Loutro, west
- Menidi, northwest
