= Diasello =

Diasello or Diaselo (Greek: Διάσελλο or Διάσελο) may refer to several places in Greece:

- Diaselo, Achaea, a village in Achaea
- Diasello, a village near Thermo in Aetolia-Acarnania
- Diasello, a village near Nafpaktos in Aetolia-Acarnania
- Diasello, Arta, a settlement in the Arta regional unit
- Diasello, Trikala, a village in Farkadona
