= Kommeno =

Kommeno Κομμένο
- Municipal unit
- Location within the regional unit

- Location within Greece
- Coordinates: 39°03′N 21°02′E
- Country: Greece
- Administrative region: Epirus
- Regional unit: Arta
- Municipality: Nikolaos Skoufas

Area
  - Municipal unit: 14.4 km^{2} (5.6 sq mi)

Population (2021)
  - Municipal unit: 524
  - Municipal unit density: 36.4/km^{2} (94.2/sq mi)
- Time zone: UTC+2 (EET)
  - Summer (DST): UTC+3 (EEST)
- Vehicle registration: ΑΤ

Kommeno (Greek: Κομμένο) is a village and a former community in the Arta regional unit, Epirus, Greece. Since the 2011 local government reform it is part of the municipality Nikolaos Skoufas, of which it is a municipal unit. The municipal unit has an area of 14.354 km^{2}. Population 524 (2021).

== Kommeno massacre ==
During the Axis Occupation of Greece in World War II, the village was the site of a massacre perpetrated by 12 Company of the 98th Regiment, of the German 1. Gebirgs-Division (First Mountain Division), which, on 16 August 1943, executed 317 inhabitants and torched the village.

On 12 August 1943, a two-man Wehrmacht reconnaissance team had come across a small group of andartes in the village and had reported back to divisional headquarters in Ioannina. On the evening of 15 August 1943, Colonel Josef Salminger, the commanding officer of the 98th Regiment, ordered 12 Company to attack the village on the following morning. The attack was led by 12 Company's leader, Lieutenant Röser, who personally shot the village priest at the outset of the assault. Men, women and children (74 of them under the age of 10) were killed indiscriminately, but almost half of the village's population managed to escape by swimming across the Arachthos river. The first Wehrmacht reports recorded that 150 civilians had died. As the reports moved up the command chain, they were amended so that "150 civilians" became "150 enemy". The names of the 317 villagers who were killed are now recorded on a marble monument in the village's main square.

== Cultural Association of Kommeno ==
The massacre has become the basic cause leading to the foundation of the Cultural Association of Kommeno. The association was founded in 1976, the result of collaboration by students and farmers inhabiting the village. The main goal is to make the world familiar with the history of the village and to change the habits and ways of thinking of its citizens’ mainly the village’s youth. Since 1980, the association has launched a series of activities that aim to trigger the villagers’ interest, to make them more responsive, sensitive, when it comes the matter of history and culture. Members of the association would like others to understand and feel that they inhabit on a diverse level, with different ways of thinking, and certain questions answered. Younger generations have been told to be open minded to new trends according with theories, practices, and perspectives that are becoming the starting points of the era.

These activities that the association is organizing are centered on music, theater, cinema, sports, visual arts, reading, cycling, theatrical games, puppet constructions and shows, drawing and dancing as well as any form of art that contributes to the educational uprising of the people. Well-known local and international musicians and actors have been invited to take part at the annual memorial festivities.

Since the year of 2008 a "Percussion Camp" (Κρουστοπανήγυρις) has been taking place in various spots around Kommeno. Hundreds of artists became familiar with the background of the village and performed in front of the village’s inhabitants as well as people from nearby villages. Among them, artists from various countries have also taken part, such as Germany, Italy, Bulgaria, United States, Africa, Cuba and more. Among famous artists that have been taking part is Gunter Baby Sommer’ a well known German percussionist creating his album “Songs for Kommeno http://www.intaktrec.ch/190-a.htm” which he has performed at various European cities (the jazz festival in Berlin, Zyrich, Vienna etc), as well as Paul Wertico, the seven-time Grammy Award winner drummer, former member of the famous Pat Metheny jazz group. These people all visited Kommeno on the days that the Festival has been taking place. Their participation has been a tremendous help for the villagers as they became more familiar with various forms of Art, culture and mentalities coming from different civilizations.

In order to accomplish its goals, the members of the association are cooperating with other national NGO’s on matters of environment, employment, youth entrepreneurship and history. Three years before, we’ with the help of the Cultural Antenna of Preveza region implemented the program “The Europe for its citizens”, under the title “Places and Words of memory; placement and technical skills of the citizens”. The main goal of that program was to link the efforts of retaining the memory of the past with the creation of the future, centered on a democratic European society, with the absence of various social exclusions. The project was founded by the European Commission’ part of the program “The Europe for its Citizens”. The central aims of this action was to offer opportunities to the European citizens to meet each other through the sharing of common history and experiences related to the Nazi-Fascism era as well as the Second World War in order to trace the educational pillars for peace, the rights of the citizens and the founding principles of democracy.

=== Missions abroad ===
Since August 2013, for the first time after its establishment, the association is reaching out for Europe. Participating in different projects around Europe, it is expanding its mission.

In October 2013, representatives of the association participated at the project that took place in Turkey under the title “Am I a Mother, Woman or Laborer?”. The main theme of the project was the placement of the farming women in their local societies, regarding their social and political rights, as well as their relations with the opposite sex.

The association is working on new forms of action and projects. The actions that the association is centered on is the promotion of cultural heritage and the protection of the environment. Its main interests is the quality of life, the harmonic and equal coexistence between humans and nature as well as to trigger the local community.

The latest project that was launched in Copenhagen, Denmark, back in August 2013, will be implemented in August 2014 and stands under the title "The Dialogue Agents", a collaboration between Denmark, Turkey, Hungary and Greece. Its main theme will be the dialogue challenges within a sociopolitical and religious content. Both visits-along with the preparatory visit in May 2014- will take place in Erbaa city, in Turkey.
