= Tetrafylia =

Tetrafylia Τετραφυλία
- Municipal unit
- Location within the regional unit

- Location within Greece
- Coordinates: 39°17′N 21°18′E
- Country: Greece
- Administrative region: Epirus
- Regional unit: Arta
- Municipality: Georgios Karaiskakis

Area
  - Municipal unit: 159.8 km^{2} (61.7 sq mi)

Population (2021)
  - Municipal unit: 2,248
  - Municipal unit density: 14.07/km^{2} (36.43/sq mi)
- Time zone: UTC+2 (EET)
  - Summer (DST): UTC+3 (EEST)
- Postal code: 470 47
- Vehicle registration: ΑΤ

Tetrafylia (Greek: Τετραφυλία) is a former municipality in the Arta regional unit, Epirus, Greece. Since the 2011 local government reform it is part of the municipality Georgios Karaiskakis, of which it is a municipal unit. The municipal unit has an area of 159.823 km^{2}. Population 2,248 (2021). The seat of the municipality was in Astrochori.
