= Filothei, Arta =

Filothei Φιλοθέη
- Municipal unit
- Location within the regional unit

- Location within Greece
- Coordinates: 39°09′N 20°54′E
- Country: Greece
- Administrative region: Epirus
- Regional unit: Arta
- Municipality: Arta

Area
  - Municipal unit: 50.6 km^{2} (19.5 sq mi)

Population (2021)
  - Municipal unit: 5,160
  - Municipal unit density: 102/km^{2} (264/sq mi)
- Time zone: UTC+2 (EET)
  - Summer (DST): UTC+3 (EEST)
- Postal code: 470 42
- Vehicle registration: ΑΤ

Filothei (Greek: Φιλοθέη) is a former municipality located in the Arta regional unit, Epirus, Greece. Following the 2011 local government reform, it became part of the municipality of Arta and was designated as a municipal unit within it. The municipal unit has an area of 50.614 km². As of the 2021 census, the population was 5,160. The seat of the municipality was in Chalkiades.
