= Vlacherna =

Vlacherna Βλαχέρνα
- Municipal unit
- Location within the regional unit

- Location within Greece
- Coordinates: 39°10′N 21°00′E
- Country: Greece
- Administrative region: Epirus
- Regional unit: Arta
- Municipality: Arta

Area
  - Municipal unit: 76.1 km^{2} (29.4 sq mi)

Population (2021)
  - Municipal unit: 2,832
  - Municipal unit density: 37.2/km^{2} (96.4/sq mi)
  - Community: 386
- Time zone: UTC+2 (EET)
  - Summer (DST): UTC+3 (EEST)
- Vehicle registration: ΑΤ

Vlacherna (Greek: Βλαχέρνα) is a village and a former municipality in the Arta regional unit, Epirus, Greece. Since the 2011 local government reform it is part of the municipality Arta, of which it is a municipal unit. The municipal unit has an area of 76.142 km^{2}. Population 2,832 (2021). The seat of the municipality was in Grammenitsa.
