= Amvrakikos =

Municipal unit in Epirus, Greece

Amvrakikos Αμβρακικός
- Municipal unit
- Location within the regional unit

- Location within Greece
- Coordinates: 39°06′N 20°53′E
- Country: Greece
- Administrative region: Epirus
- Regional unit: Arta
- Municipality: Arta

Area
  - Municipal unit: 158.885 km^{2} (61.346 sq mi)

Population (2021)
  - Municipal unit: 3,755
  - Municipal unit density: 23.63/km^{2} (61.21/sq mi)
- Time zone: UTC+2 (EET)
  - Summer (DST): UTC+3 (EEST)
- Vehicle registration: ΑΤ

Amvrakikos (Greek: Αμβρακικός) is a former municipality in the Arta regional unit, Epirus, Greece. Since the 2011 local government reform it is part of the municipality Arta, of which it is a municipal unit. The municipal unit has an area of 158.885 km^{2}. Population 3,755 (2021). The seat of the municipality was in Aneza.
