= Georgios Karaiskakis (municipality) =

Georgios Karaiskakis Γεώργιος Καραϊσκάκης
- Municipality
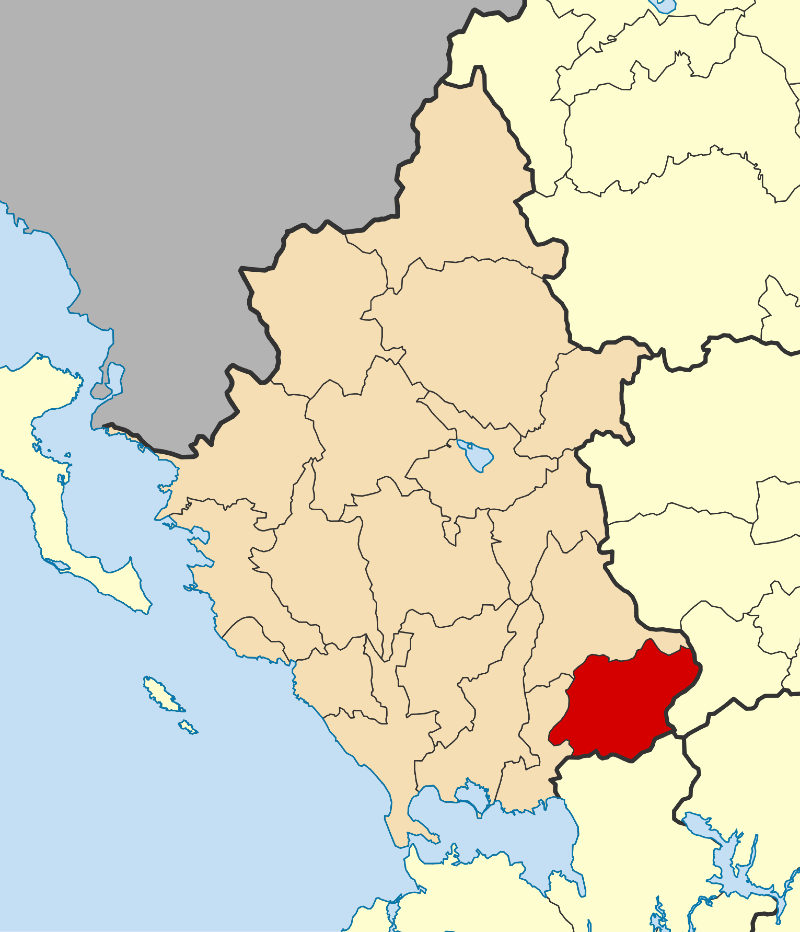

- Location within Greece
- Coordinates: 39°10′N 21°11′E
- Country: Greece
- Administrative region: Epirus
- Regional unit: Arta
- Seat: Ano Kalentini

Area
  - Municipality: 463.9 km^{2} (179.1 sq mi)
  - Municipal unit: 174.2 km^{2} (67.3 sq mi)

Population (2021)
  - Municipality: 5,278
  - Density: 11.38/km^{2} (29.47/sq mi)
  - Municipal unit: 1,978
  - Municipal unit density: 11.35/km^{2} (29.41/sq mi)
- Time zone: UTC+2 (EET)
  - Summer (DST): UTC+3 (EEST)
- Postal code: 470 48
- Vehicle registration: ΑΤ

Georgios Karaiskakis (Greek: Γεώργιος Καραϊσκάκης) is a municipality in the regional unit of Arta, Greece, named after Georgios Karaiskakis, a leader of the Greek War of Independence. The seat of the municipality is in Ano Kalentini.

== Municipality ==
The present municipality Georgios Karaiskakis was formed at the 2011 local government reform by the merger of the following 3 former municipalities, that became municipal units:

- Georgios Karaiskakis
- Irakleia
- Tetrafylia

The municipality has an area of 463.889 km^{2}, the municipal unit 174.179 km^{2}.
