= Peta, Greece =

Peta Πέτα
- Municipal unit
- Location within the regional unit

- Location within Greece
- Coordinates: 39°10′N 21°02′E
- Country: Greece
- Administrative region: Epirus
- Regional unit: Arta
- Municipality: Nikolaos Skoufas

Area
  - Municipal unit: 105.6 km^{2} (40.8 sq mi)

Population (2021)
  - Municipal unit: 4,604
  - Municipal unit density: 43.60/km^{2} (112.9/sq mi)
  - Community: 4,006
- Time zone: UTC+2 (EET)
  - Summer (DST): UTC+3 (EEST)
- Vehicle registration: ΑΤ

Peta (Greek: Πέτα) is a town and a former municipality in the Arta regional unit, Epirus, northwestern Greece. Since the 2011 local government reform, it is part of the municipality of Nikolaos Skoufas, of which it is the seat and a municipal unit. The municipal unit has an area of 105.571 km^{2}. Peta is located north of Amfilochia, northeast of Arta, south-southeast of Ioannina and east of Preveza. The Arachthos River and its reservoir lies to the northwest.

== Subdivisions ==
The municipal unit Peta is subdivided into the following communities (constituent villages in brackets):

- Peta (Peta, Agios Dimitrios, Amfithea, Ano Agioi Anargyroi, Kleisto, Neochoraki, Pournari)
- Markiniada (Markiniada, Diasella, Zygos, Megkla, Melates)
- Megarchi

== Population ==
Year	Town population	Community population	Municipal unit population
1981	-	3,515	-
1991	1,807	-	4,771
2001	1,916	3,896	4,904
2011	1,563	4,105	4,781
2021	1,443	4,006	4,604

== History ==
The battle of Peta took place in 1822 during the Greek War of Independence. The Ottoman ruled the region until 1881. The tract of land northwest of Peta remained in Ottoman hands until the Balkan Wars of 1913. Its economy slowly improved. The Battle of Peta is a milestone in the history of Europe, because for the first time European citizens from many different countries, who had been hostile to each other until then, came together to fight under the same flag for the same common values that make up the European civilisation. They are called Philhellenes (meaning: friends of Greeks).

== Notable people ==
- Nikos Rizos (1924–1999), actor

== Monuments ==
A memorial monument of the Battle of Peta is located on a cliff. The Holy Church of Saint George was built in 1850 and has been characterized as a protected monument.
