= Kompoti =

Kompóti Κομπότι
- Municipal unit
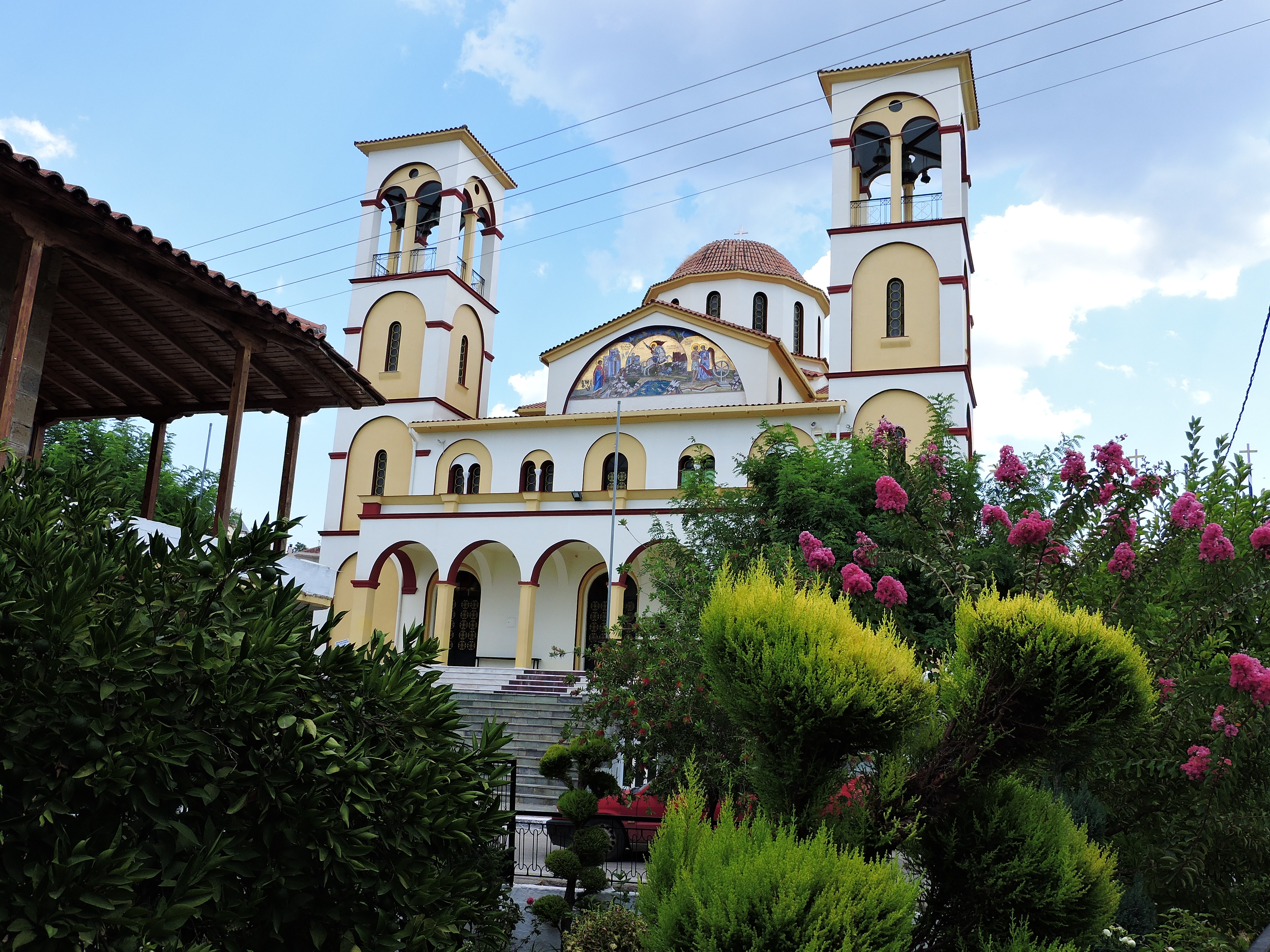
- Church of Saint George in Kompoti

- Location within the regional unit

- Location within Greece
- Coordinates: 39°06′N 21°05′E
- Country: Greece
- Administrative region: Epirus
- Regional unit: Arta
- Municipality: Nikolaos Skoufas

Area
  - Municipal unit: 38.5 km^{2} (14.9 sq mi)

Population (2021)
  - Municipal unit: 2,392
  - Municipal unit density: 62.1/km^{2} (161/sq mi)
  - Community: 1,645
- Time zone: UTC+2 (EET)
  - Summer (DST): UTC+3 (EEST)
- Postal code: 470 40
- Vehicle registration: ΑΤ

Kompóti (Greek: Κομπότι, pronounced [koˈboti]) is a village and a former municipality in the Arta regional unit, Epirus, Greece. Since the 2011 local government reform it is part of the municipality Nikolaos Skoufas, of which it is a municipal unit. The municipal unit has an area of 38.486 km^{2}. The Greek National Road 5/E55 connects Kompoti with Messolonghi to the south and Arta and Ioannina to the north. Kompoti is located north of Amfilochia and Agrinio, east-northeast of Preveza and southeast of Arta. The Ambracian Gulf is to the south. Kompoti became part of Greece in 1881.

== Subdivisions ==
The municipal unit Kompoti is subdivided into the following communities (constituent villages in brackets):

- Kompoti (Kompoti, Agios Nikolaos)
- Foteino
- Sellades (Sellades, Alonia)

== Population ==
Year	Village	Community	Municipal unit
1981	2,002	-	-
1991	2,050	-	3,287
2001	2,128	2,357	3,485
2011	1,544	1,650	2,542
2021	1,439	1,645	2,392

== Other ==
Kompoti has a few schools, a lyceum (middle school), a gymnasium (secondary school) a few churches, banks, a post office, and a square.

Kompoti is the birthplace of Nikolaos Skoufas (Greek: Νικόλαος Σκουφάς), one of the founders of Filiki Eteria meaning Society of Friends in Greek, which was a secret organization working in the early 19th century, whose purpose was to overthrow Ottoman rule over Greece and to establish an independent Greek state.
