= Menidi, Aetolia-Acarnania =

Menidi Μενίδι
- Municipal unit
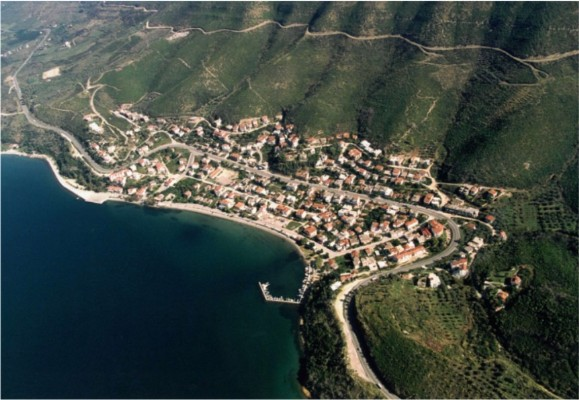

- Location within the regional unit

- Location within Greece
- Coordinates: 39°2.517′N 21°7.069′E
- Country: Greece
- Administrative region: West Greece
- Regional unit: Aetolia-Acarnania
- Municipality: Amfilochia

Area
  - Municipal unit: 107.73 km^{2} (41.59 sq mi)
- Elevation: 30 m (98 ft)
- Highest elevation: 798 m (2,618 ft)
- Lowest elevation: 0 m (0 ft)

Population (2021)
  - Municipal unit: 1,858
  - Municipal unit density: 17.25/km^{2} (44.67/sq mi)
  - Community: 1,190
- Time zone: UTC+2 (EET)
  - Summer (DST): UTC+3 (EEST)
- Postal code: 300 16
- Area code: 26810
- Vehicle registration: ΑΙ
- Website: www.menidi.gr

Menidi (Greek: Μενίδι) is a former municipality in Aetolia-Acarnania, West Greece. Since the 2011 local government reform it is part of the municipality Amfilochia, of which it is a municipal unit. The municipal unit has an area of 107.730 km^{2}. It is located by the Ambracian Gulf. Its economy is based on tourism and agriculture. It was built in the 1950s under an official government plan to house victims of the Greek Civil War and other families who did not own houses. Today it is a popular destination for Greek and foreign tourists.

== Subdivisions ==
The municipal unit Menidi is subdivided into the following communities (constituent villages in brackets):

- Menidi (Menidi, Elaiochori, Theriakisi, Katsouli, Lagkada, and Sykoula)
- Floriada (Floriada, Elaiofyto, Katharovouni, Kastriotissa, Palaia Floriada, Palaiokastro, Chrysopigi, and Chrysorrachi)

== Historical population ==
Year	Community	Municipal unit
1991	1,421	2,301
2001	1,466	2,237
2011	1,333	2,032
2021	1,190	1,858

== See also ==
- List of settlements in Aetolia-Acarnania
