= Nikolaos Skoufas (municipality) =

Nikolaos Skoufas Νικόλαος Σκουφάς
- Municipality
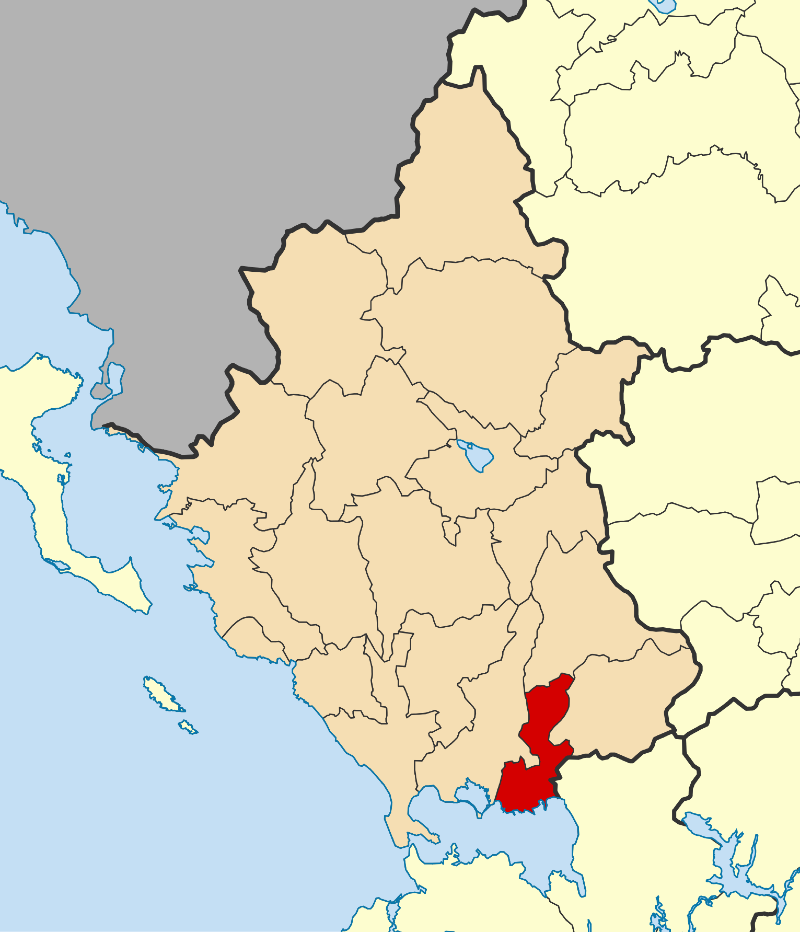

- Location within Greece
- Coordinates: 39°10′N 21°02′E
- Country: Greece
- Administrative region: Epirus
- Regional unit: Arta
- Seat: Peta

Area
  - Municipality: 231.8 km^{2} (89.5 sq mi)

Population (2021)
  - Municipality: 11,356
  - Density: 48.99/km^{2} (126.9/sq mi)
- Time zone: UTC+2 (EET)
  - Summer (DST): UTC+3 (EEST)
- Vehicle registration: ΑΤ

Nikolaos Skoufas (Greek: Νικόλαος Σκουφάς) is a municipality in the regional unit of Arta, Greece, named after Nikolaos Skoufas, a leader of the Greek independence movement. The seat of the municipality is in Peta. The municipality has an area of 231.842 km^{2}.

== Municipality ==
The present municipality Nikolaos Skoufas was formed at the 2011 local government reform by the merger of the following 4 former municipalities, that became municipal units:

- Arachthos
- Kommeno
- Kompoti
- Peta
