= Arta (regional unit) =

Arta Περιφερειακή ενότητα Άρτας
- Regional unit
- Municipalities of Arta

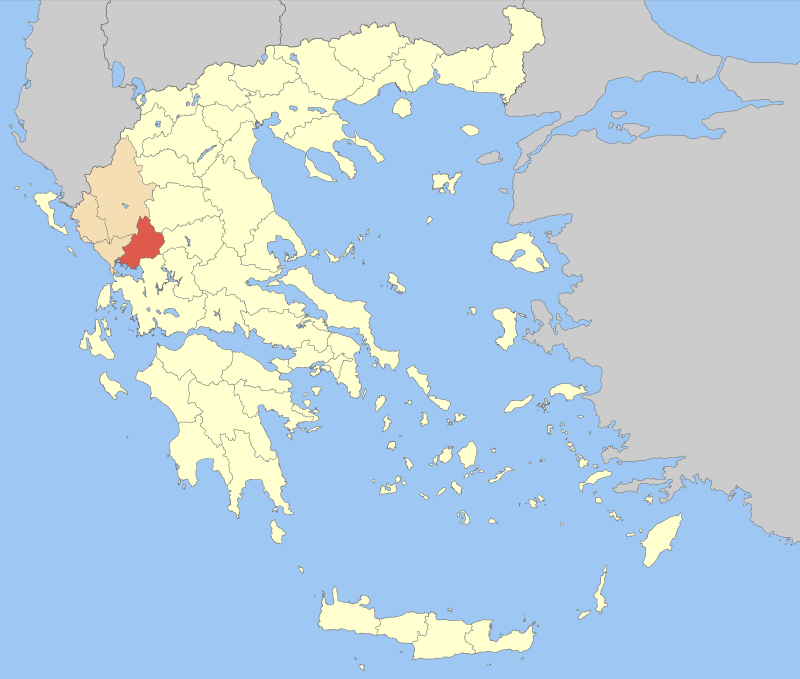
- Arta within Greece

- Location within Greece
- Coordinates: 39°15′N 21°15′E
- Country: Greece
- Administrative region: Epirus
- Seat: Arta

Area
  - Total: 1,662 km^{2} (642 sq mi)

Population (2021)
  - Total: 63,732
  - Density: 38.35/km^{2} (99.32/sq mi)
- Time zone: UTC+2 (EET)
  - Summer (DST): UTC+3 (EEST)
- Postal code: 47x xx
- Area code: 268x0
- Vehicle registration: ΑΤ
- Website: www.peartas.gov.gr

Arta (Greek: Περιφερειακή ενότητα Άρτας) is one of the regional units of Greece. It is part of the Epirus region. Its capital is the town of Arta.

== Geography ==
The regional unit of Arta is located north of the Ambracian Gulf. The main mountain ranges are the Athamanika in the northeast, the Pindus in the east, and Valtou in the southeast. Only one mountain road links Arta with the Pineios valley and Thessaly. There are low-lying agricultural plains in the west. Arta borders on the regional units of Preveza in the west, Ioannina to the north, Trikala in the east, Karditsa to the east and Aetolia-Acarnania to the south.

The main rivers are the Acheloos in the east, the Arachthos in the centre, and the Louros in the west. Most of the population lives in the west, in the Arachthos valley, south and east of Arta. The Athamanika and Valtou mountains are the least populated.

== Administration ==
The regional unit Arta is subdivided into 4 municipalities. These are (number as in the map in the infobox):

- Arta (1)
- Central Tzoumerka (Kentrika Tzoumerka, 3)
- Georgios Karaiskakis (2)
- Nikolaos Skoufas (4)

=== Prefecture ===
Arta was established as a prefecture in 1882 (Greek: Νομός Άρτας). As a part of the 2011 Kallikratis government reform, the regional unit Arta was created out of the former prefecture Arta. The prefecture had the same territory as the present regional unit. At the same time, the municipalities were reorganised, according to the table below.

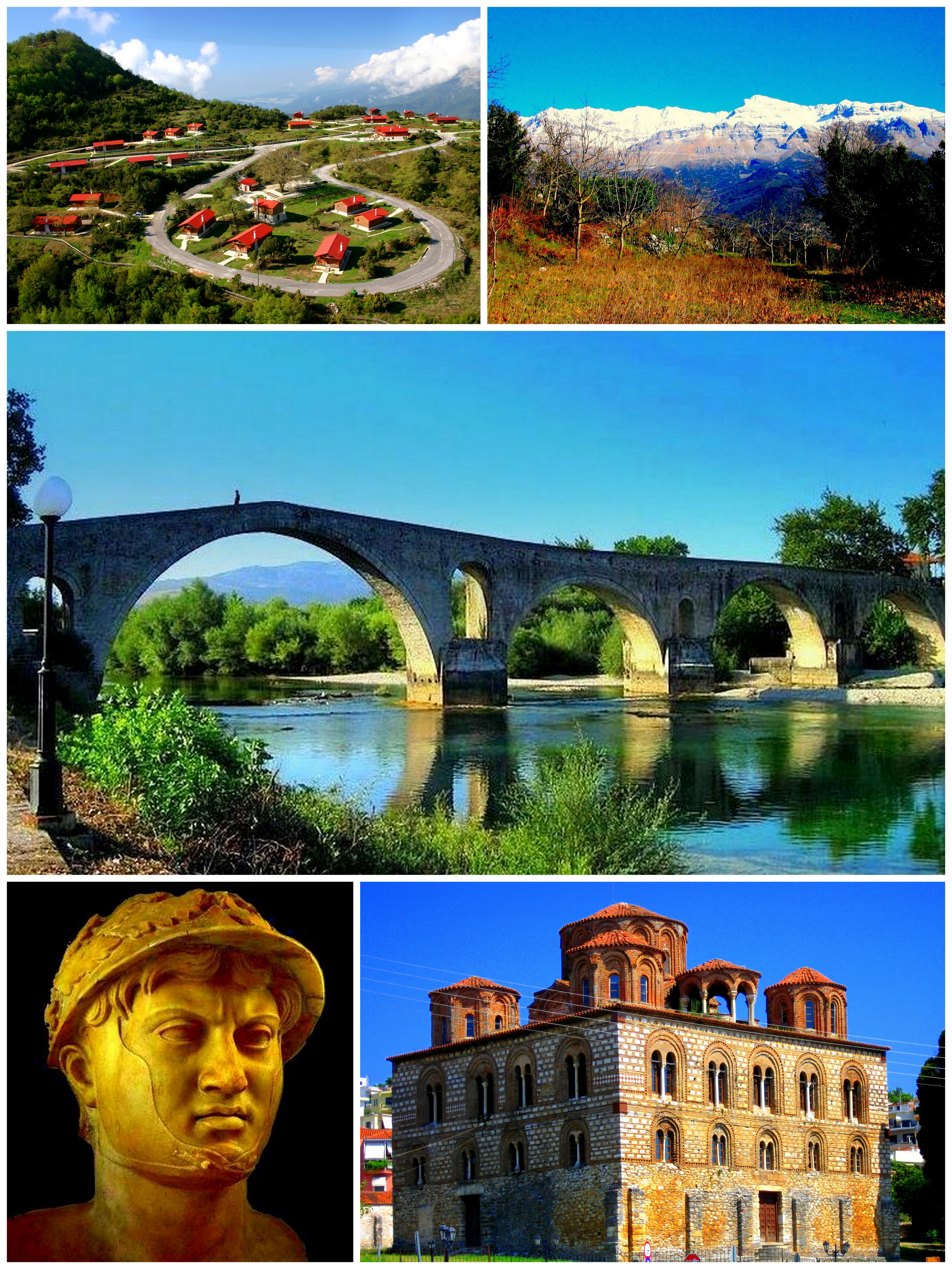
Images of regional unit

New municipality	Old municipalities	Seat
Arta	Arta	Arta
Arta	Amvrakikos	Arta
Arta	Vlacherna	Arta
Arta	Xirovouni	Arta
Arta	Filothei	Arta
Central Tzoumerka (Kentrika Tzoumerka)	Athamania	Vourgareli
Central Tzoumerka (Kentrika Tzoumerka)	Agnanta	Vourgareli
Central Tzoumerka (Kentrika Tzoumerka)	Theodoriana	Vourgareli
Central Tzoumerka (Kentrika Tzoumerka)	Melissourgoi	Vourgareli
Georgios Karaiskakis	Georgios Karaiskakis	Ano Kalentini
Georgios Karaiskakis	Irakleia	Ano Kalentini
Georgios Karaiskakis	Tetrafylia	Ano Kalentini
Nikolaos Skoufas	Peta	Peta
Nikolaos Skoufas	Arachthos	Peta
Nikolaos Skoufas	Kommeno	Peta
Nikolaos Skoufas	Kompoti	Peta

== History ==
Arta was one of the capitals of the Despotate of Epirus in the late Middle Ages. The territory of the regional unit was ceded to Greece in 1881 by the Ottoman Empire, along with Thessaly, in accordance with the 1878 Congress of Berlin. A famous landmark of Arta is the Old Bridge over the Arachthos river.

== Transport ==
The A5 motorway, part of European route E951, passes through the regional unit: other main roads in the unit include the EO5 and EO30 national roads.

== Sporting teams ==
- Anagennisi Artas

== People ==
- Pyrrhus, (318 BC-272 BC) general and king of Epirus
- Epicrates of Ambracia, 4th BC comic poet
- Silanus of Ambracia
- Epigonus of Ambracia, 6th-5th BC musician
- Georgios Karaiskakis, Years of service 1796 - 1827 Rank - General, Battles/wars Greek War of Independence
- Maximus the Greek, (c. 1475-1556) publicist, writer, scholar, humanist and translator
- Napoleon Zervas (1891–1957)
- Theodoros Tzinis
- Nikolaos Skoufas
- Yannis Makriyannis
- Kostas Kristallis, poet
- Yiannis Moralis, (1916) painter
- Antonios Nikopolidis, (1971) footballer
- Yannis Anastasiou, (1973) footballer
- Nikos Rizos, (1924 - April 20, 1999), actor

== See also ==
- List of settlements in the Arta regional unit
