= Epirus (region) =

Administrative region of Greece

Epirus Ήπειρος
- Administrative region of Greece; Traditional region of Greece
- Epirus within Greece
- Coordinates: 39°36′N 20°48′E
- Country: Greece
- Decentralized Administration: Epirus and Western Macedonia
- Capital: Ioannina
- Regional units: List: Arta; Ioannina; Preveza; Thesprotia

Government
  - Governor: Alexandros Kachrimanis (New Democracy)

Area
  - Total: 9,203.22 km^{2} (3,553.38 sq mi)

Population (2021)
  - Total: 319,991
  - Density: 34.7695/km^{2} (90.0525/sq mi)
- Demonym: Epirote

GDP
  - Total: €4.770 billion (2024)
  - Per capita: €14,722 (2024)
- Time zone: UTC+2 (EET)
  - Summer (DST): UTC+3 (EEST)
- ISO 3166 code: GR-D
- HDI (2023): 0.892 very high · 6th of 13
- Website: www.php.gov.gr

Epirus (/ɪˈpaɪrəs/ ih-PY-rəs; Greek: Ήπειρος, romanized: Ípiros, [ˈi.pi.ros]) is a traditional geographic and modern administrative region in northwestern Greece. It borders the regions of Western Macedonia and Thessaly to the east, West Greece to the south, the Ionian Sea and Ionian Islands to the west and Albania to the north. The region has an area of about 9,200 km^{2} (3,600 sq mi). It is part of the wider historical region of Epirus, which overlaps modern Albania and Greece but lies mostly within Greek territory.

== Geography and ecology ==
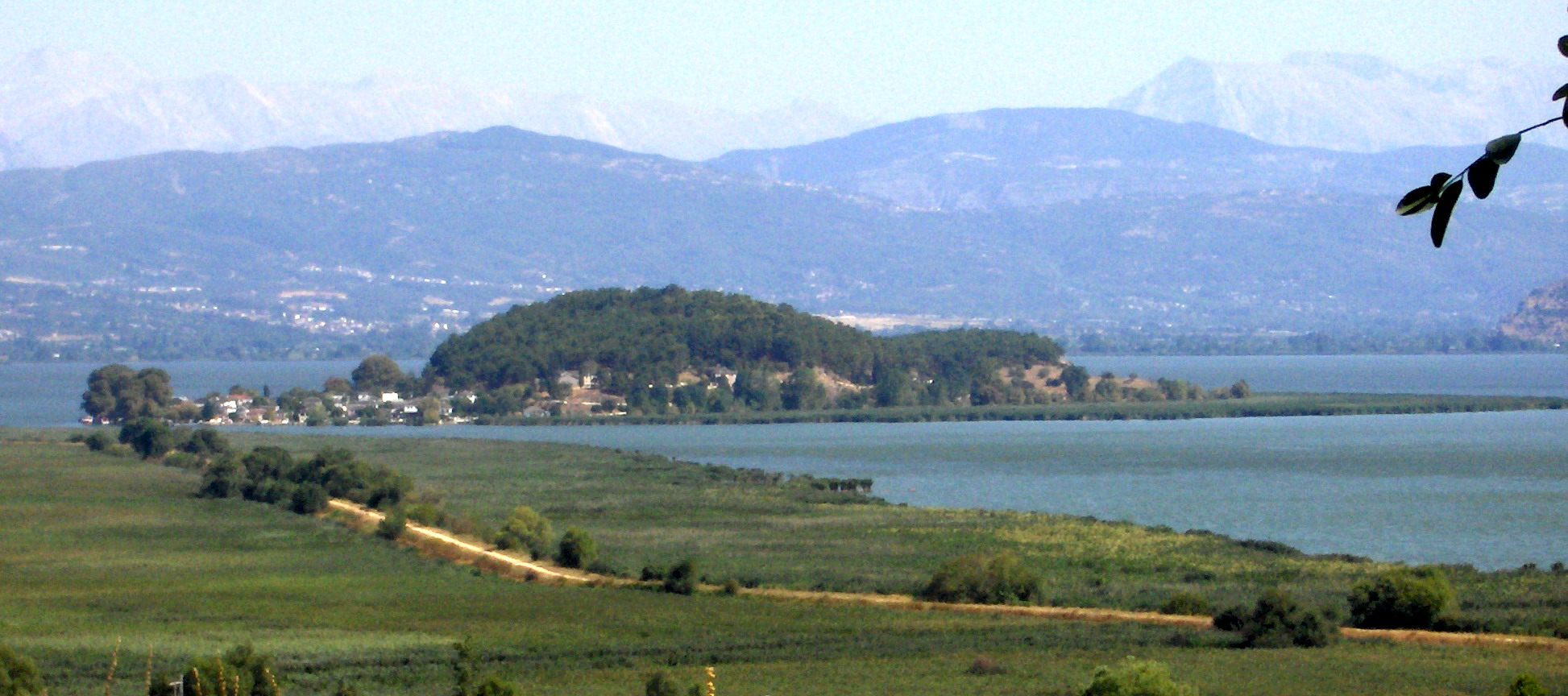
Lake Pamvotis with the Ioannina Island

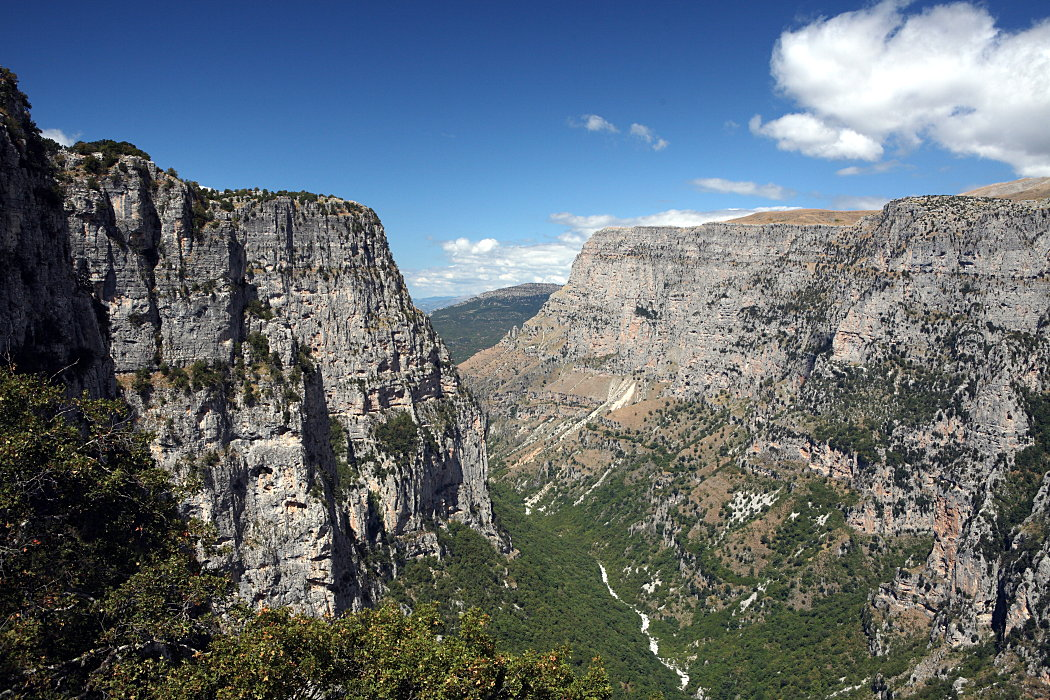
Vikos–Aoös National Park

Greek Epirus, like the region as a whole, is rugged and mountainous. It comprises the land of the ancient Molossians and Thesprotians, and a small part of the land of the Chaonians, the greater part being in Southern Albania. It is largely made up of mountainous ridges, part of the Dinaric Alps. The region's highest spot is Mount Smolikas, at an altitude of 2,637 metres (8,652 ft) above sea level. In the east, the Pindus Mountains that form the spine of mainland Greece separate Epirus from Macedonia and Thessaly. Most of Epirus lies on the windward side of the Pindus. The winds from the Ionian Sea offer the region more rainfall than any other part of Greece.

The Vikos-Aoos and Pindus National Parks are situated in the Ioannina Prefecture of the region. Both areas have a wide range of fauna and flora. The climate of Epirus is mainly alpine. The vegetation is made up mainly of coniferous species. The animal life is especially rich in this area and includes, among other species, bears, wolves, foxes, deer and lynxes.

== Administration ==
The Epirus Region (Περιφέρεια Ηπείρου, Periféria Ipírou), as it is currently defined, was established in the 1987 administrative reform and was divided into prefectures (νομοί, nomí), which were further subdivided into municipalities (δήμοι, dhími).

Greece's local government reforms of 2011 streamlined local government by replacing the prefectures with regional units (περιφερειακή ενότητα, periferiakí enótita) and re-structuring former municipalities and communities to reduce their total number. Today, the four regional units of Epirus are: Thesprotia, Ioannina, Arta, and Preveza.

The administrative division of the Epirus region in municipalities. In shades of yellow, the regional unit of Thesprotia, in red, Ioannina, in blue, Preveza and in green, Arta.

| Regional Unit | Municipality | Population (2011) | Population (2021) | Seat |
|---|---|---|---|---|
| Ioannina | Ioannina | 112,486 | 113,094 | Ioannina |
| Ioannina | Konitsa | 6,362 | 5,325 | Konitsa |
| Ioannina | Pogoni | 8,960 | 6,859 | Kalpaki |
| Ioannina | Zagori | 3,724 | 3,384 | Asprangeloi |
| Ioannina | Metsovo | 6,196 | 5,429 | Metsovo |
| Ioannina | Zitsa | 14,766 | 13,630 | Eleousa |
| Ioannina | North Tzoumerka | 5,714 | 5,075 | Pramanta |
| Ioannina | Dodoni | 9,693 | 7,258 | Agia Kyriaki |
| Arta | Arta | 43,166 | 41,633 | Arta |
| Arta | Central Tzoumerka | 6,178 | 5,562 | Vourgareli |
| Arta | Nikolaos Skoufas | 12,753 | 11,411 | Peta |
| Arta | Georgios Karaiskakis | 5,780 | 5,321 | Ano Kalentini |
| Preveza | Preveza | 31,733 | 30,893 | Preveza |
| Preveza | Ziros | 13,892 | 13,071 | Filippiada |
| Preveza | Parga | 11,866 | 10,771 | Kanallaki |
| Thesprotia | Igoumenitsa | 25,814 | 25,709 | Igoumenitsa |
| Thesprotia | Souli | 10,063 | 8,767 | Paramythia |
| Thesprotia | Filiates | 7,710 | 6,351 | Filiates |

The region's governor, since 1 January 2011, is Alexandros Kachrimanis, who was elected in the November 2010 local administration elections for the New Democracy and Popular Orthodox Rally parties, and re-elected in May 2014 and May 2019.

== Communities ==
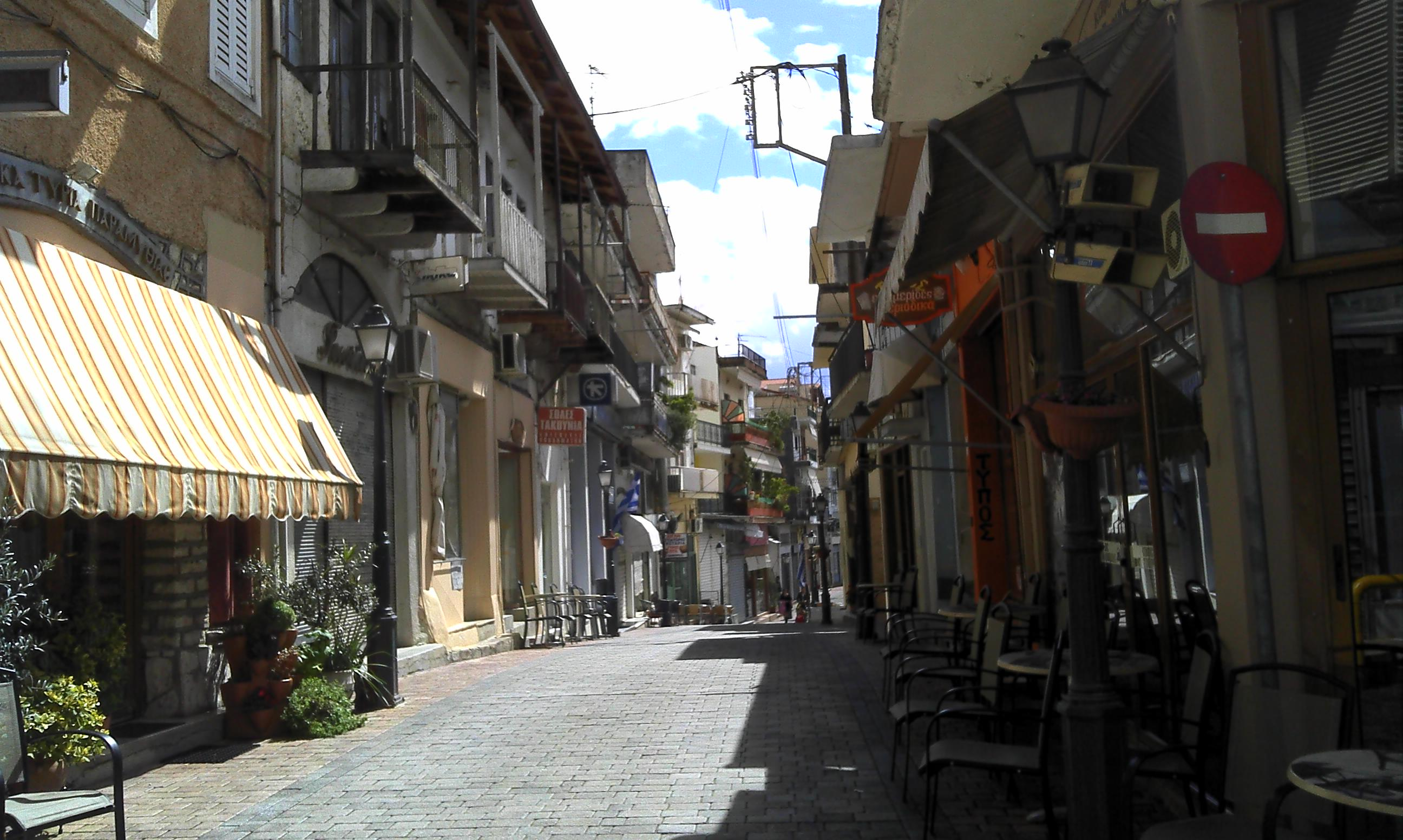
Street of Paramythia

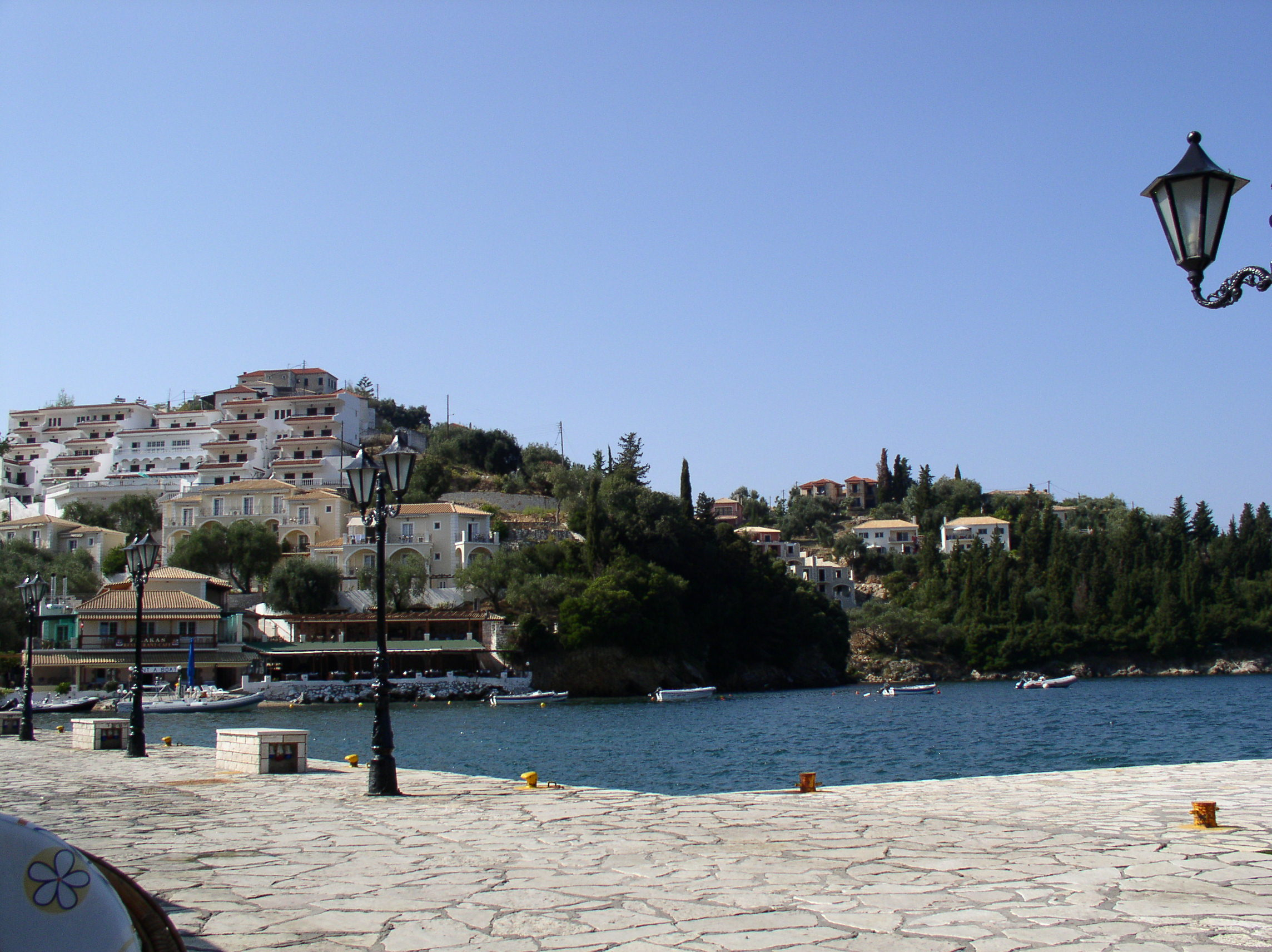
Syvota

=== Municipalities ===
- Arta
- Dodoni
- Filiates
- Igoumenitsa
- Ioannina
- Konitsa
- Metsovo
- Parga
- Pogoni
- Preveza
- Zagori
- Zitsa

=== Municipal units ===
- Athamania
- Filippiada
- Paramythia
- Kompoti
- Perdika
- Peta
- Pramanta
- Syvota
- Tetrafylia

== Economy ==
Epirus has few resources and its rugged terrain makes agriculture difficult. Sheep and goat pastoralism has always been an important activity in the region (Epirus provides more than 45% of meat to the Greek market), but there seems to be a decline in recent years. Tobacco is grown around Ioannina, and there is also some farming and fishing, but most of the area's food must be imported from more fertile regions of Greece. Epirus is home to a number of the country's most famous dairy product brands, which produce feta cheese among others. Another important area of the local economy is tourism, especially eco-tourism. The natural environment of the area, as well as its traditional villages and lifestyle, have made Epirus a tourist attraction.

The gross domestic product (GDP) of the region was €4.1 billion in 2018, accounting for 2.2% of Greek economic output. GDP per capita adjusted for purchasing power was €14,700 or 49% of the EU27 average in the same year. The GDP per employee was 63% of the EU average. Epirus is the region in Greece with the third lowest GDP per capita and one of the poorest regions in the EU.

== Demographics ==
Around 320,000 people live in Epirus. According to the 2001 census, it has the lowest population of the 13 regions of Greece. This is partly due to the impact of repeated wars in the 20th century as well as mass emigration due to adverse economic conditions. The capital and largest city of the region is Ioannina, where nearly a third of the population lives. The great majority of the population are Greeks, as well as Aromanians and Arvanites. The region has shrunk by 17,313 people between 2011 and 2021, experiencing a population loss of 5.1%.

The delineation of the border between Greece and Albania in 1913 left some Albanian-populated villages on the Greek side of the border as well as Greek-populated villages and cities in Northern Epirus, in present-day Albania. In the past, the coastal region of Thesprotia was also home to a Cham Albanian minority, whose number did not exceed 25,000 in the 1940s, alongside the local Greeks. After the war and their expulsion, the Greek census of 1951 counted a total of 127 Muslim Albanian Chams in Epirus, while 44 were counted in 1986 in Thesprotia.

== Archaeological sites ==
- Dodona
- Passaron
- Nicopolis
- Church of the Parigoritissa
- Ioannina Castle
- Parga Castle

== Gallery ==
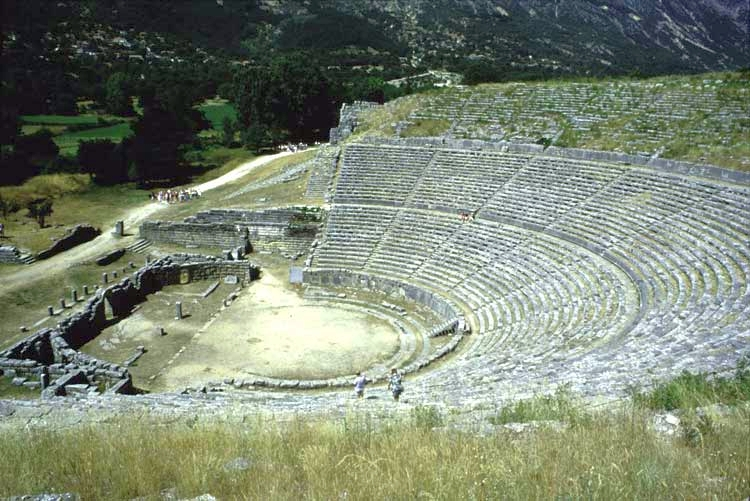
The ancient theatre in Dodona

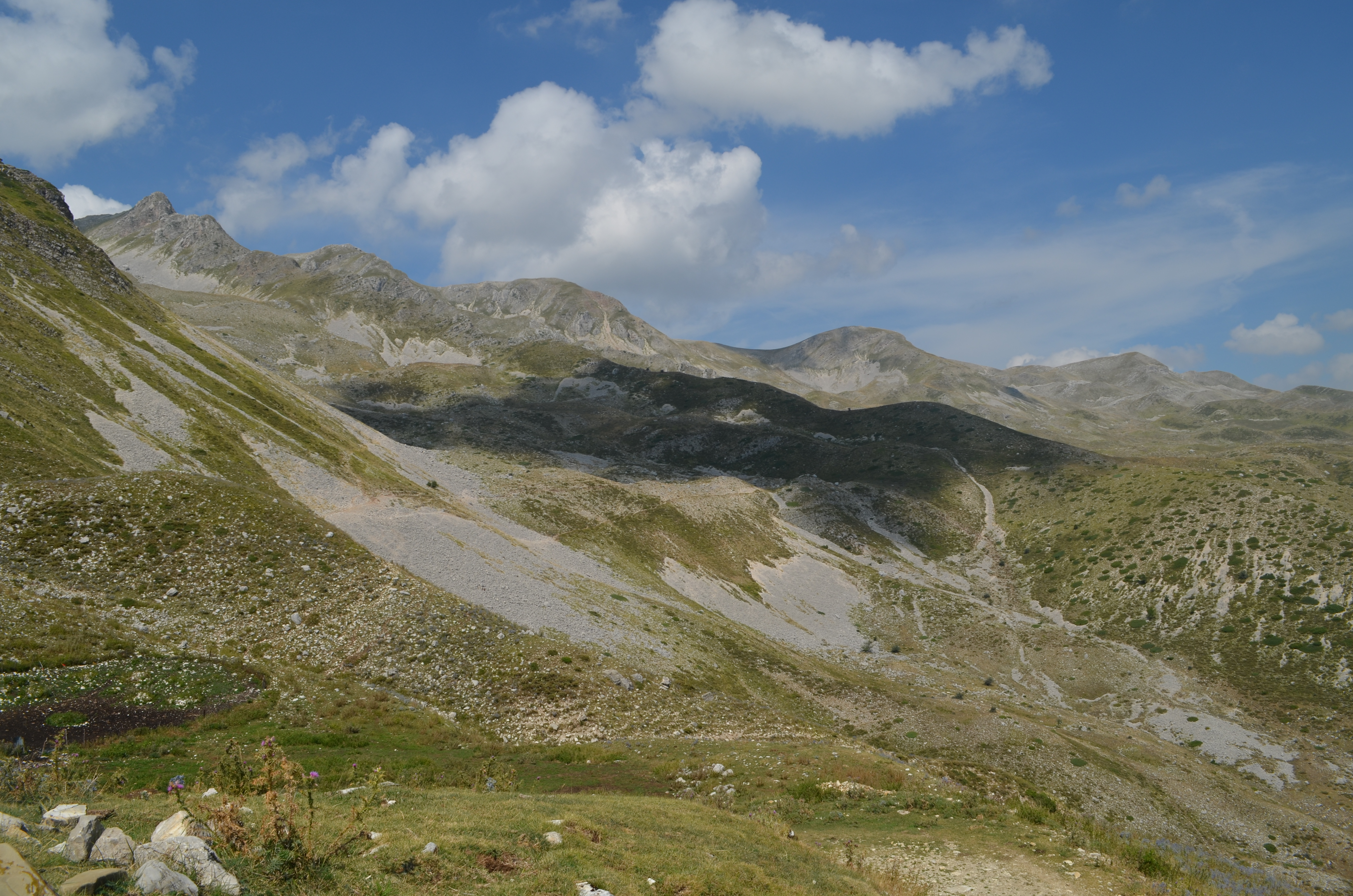
Pindus mountains

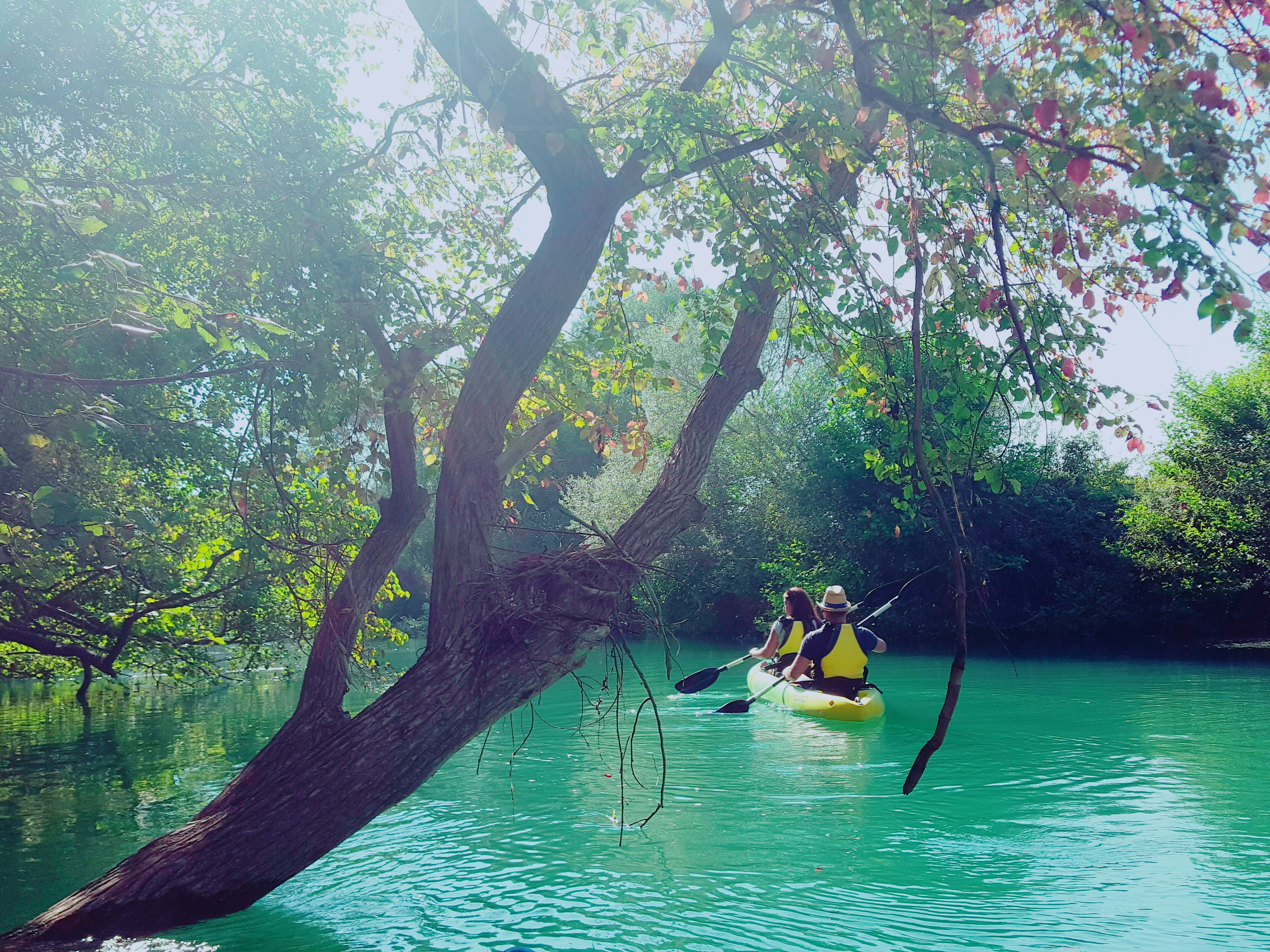
Acheron river

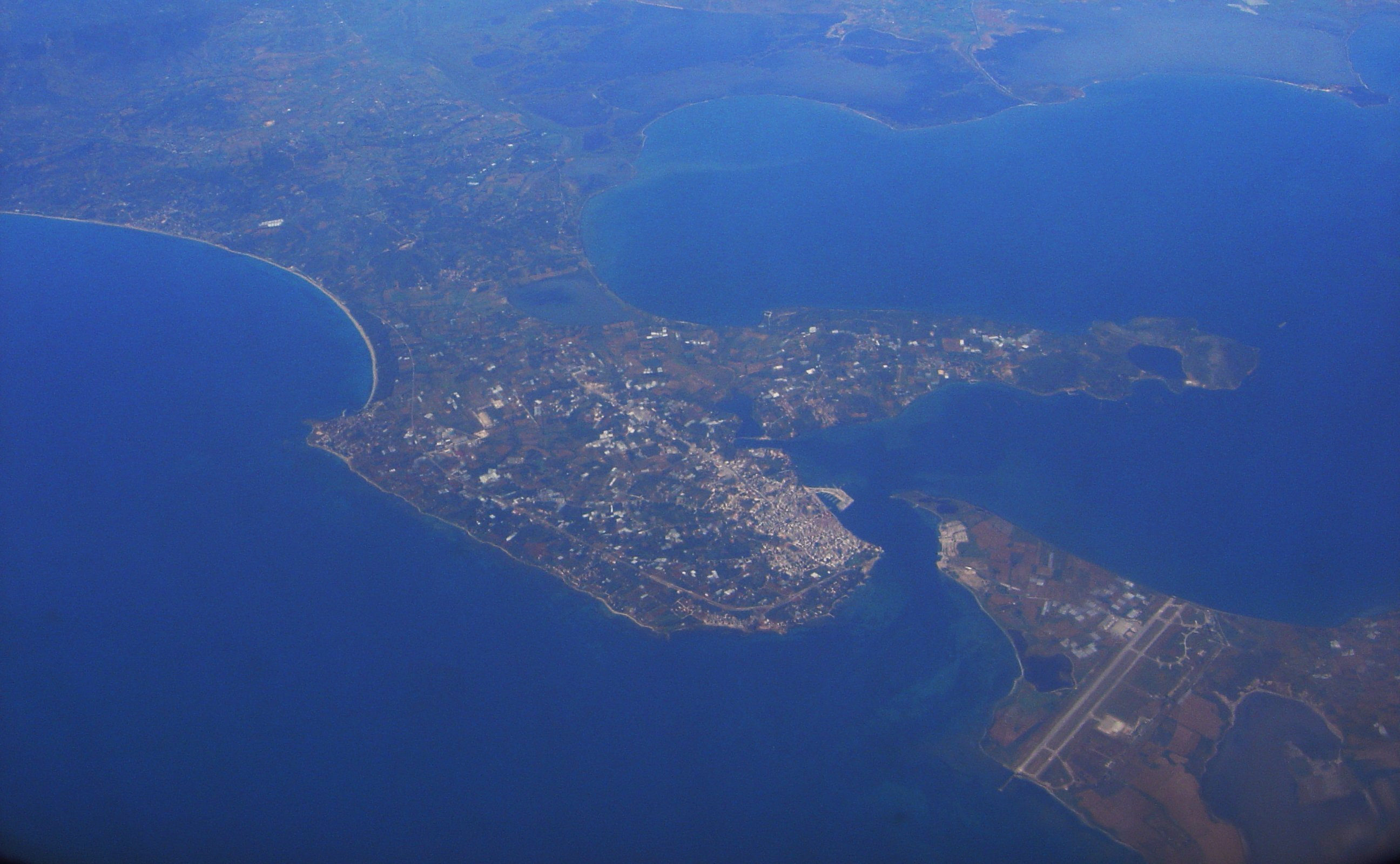
Ambracian Gulf of Preveza

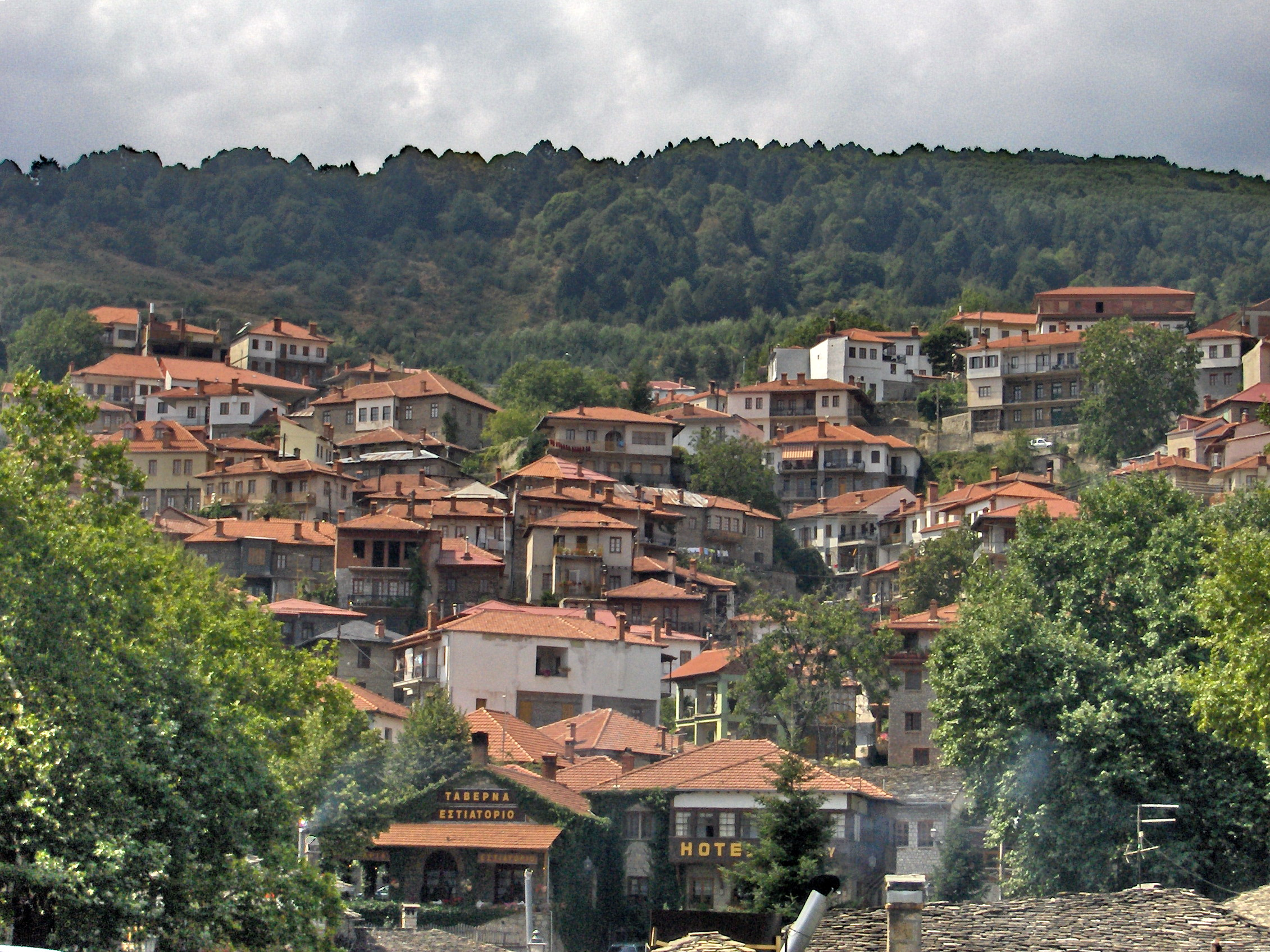
Metsovo

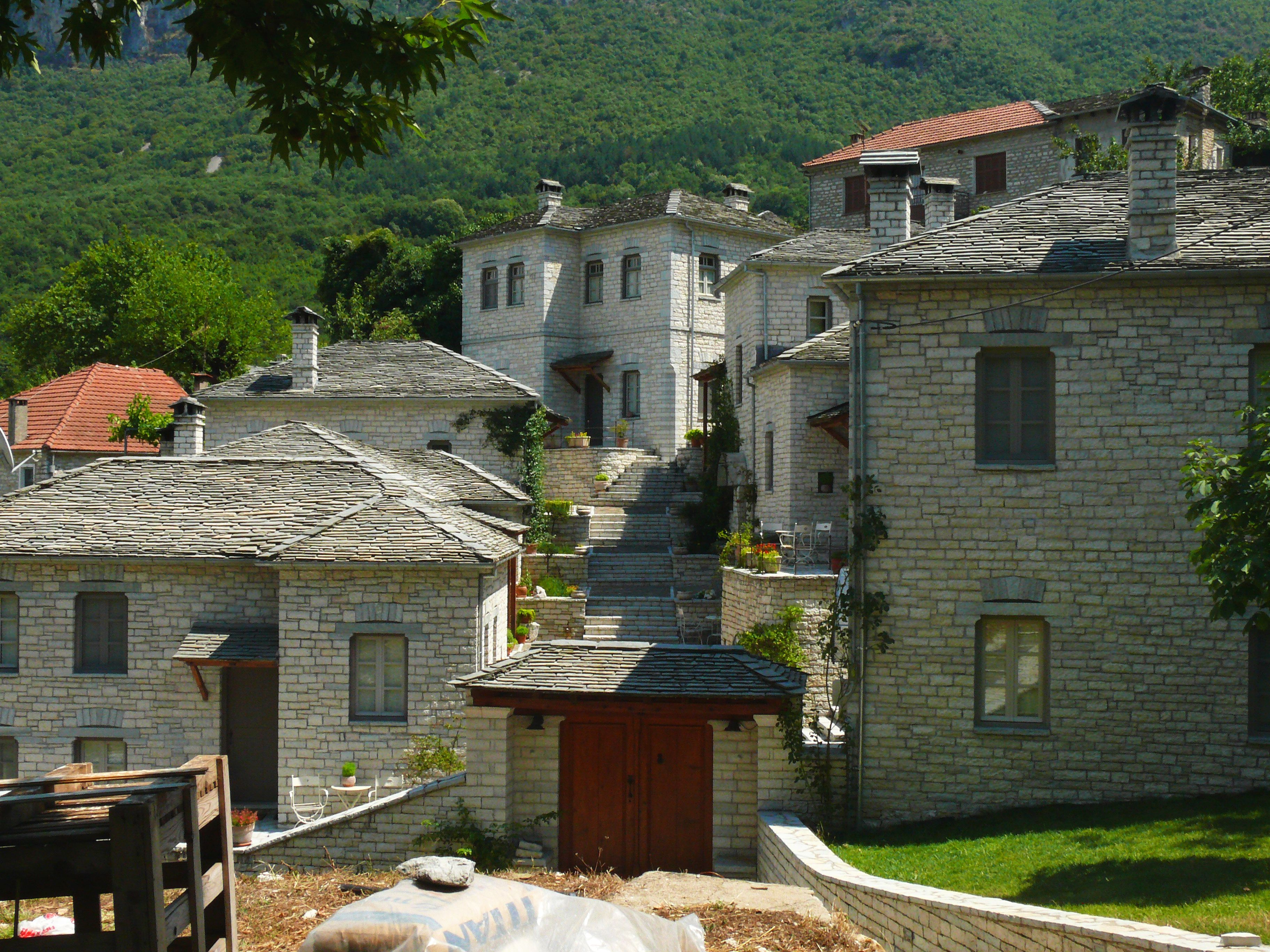
Aristi village in Zagori, example of Epirotic architecture

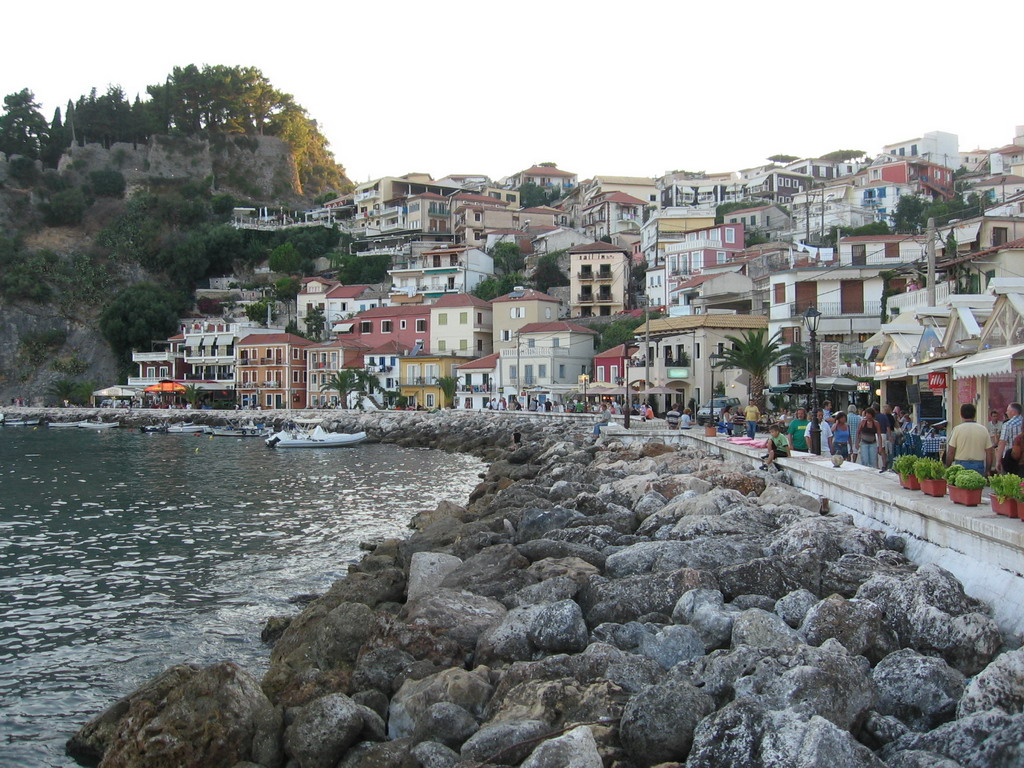
Parga

== See also ==
- Epirotic cuisine
