= Athamania (disambiguation) =

Athamania (Greek: Αθαμανία) can refer to:

- Athamania, the area inhabited in Antiquity by the Athamanians
- Athamania, Arta, a municipal unit in the regional unit of Arta, Greece
- Athamania, Trikala, a village in the regional unit of Trikala, Greece

== See also ==
- Athamanes, Karditsa, a municipality in the regional unit of Karditsa, Greece
