= 13th-century Byzantine domes =

The Late Byzantine Period, from 1204 to 1453, has an unsettled chronology of buildings, especially during the Latin Occupation. The fragmentation of the empire, beginning in 1204, is reflected in a fragmentation of church design and regional innovations.

== Despotate of Epirus ==
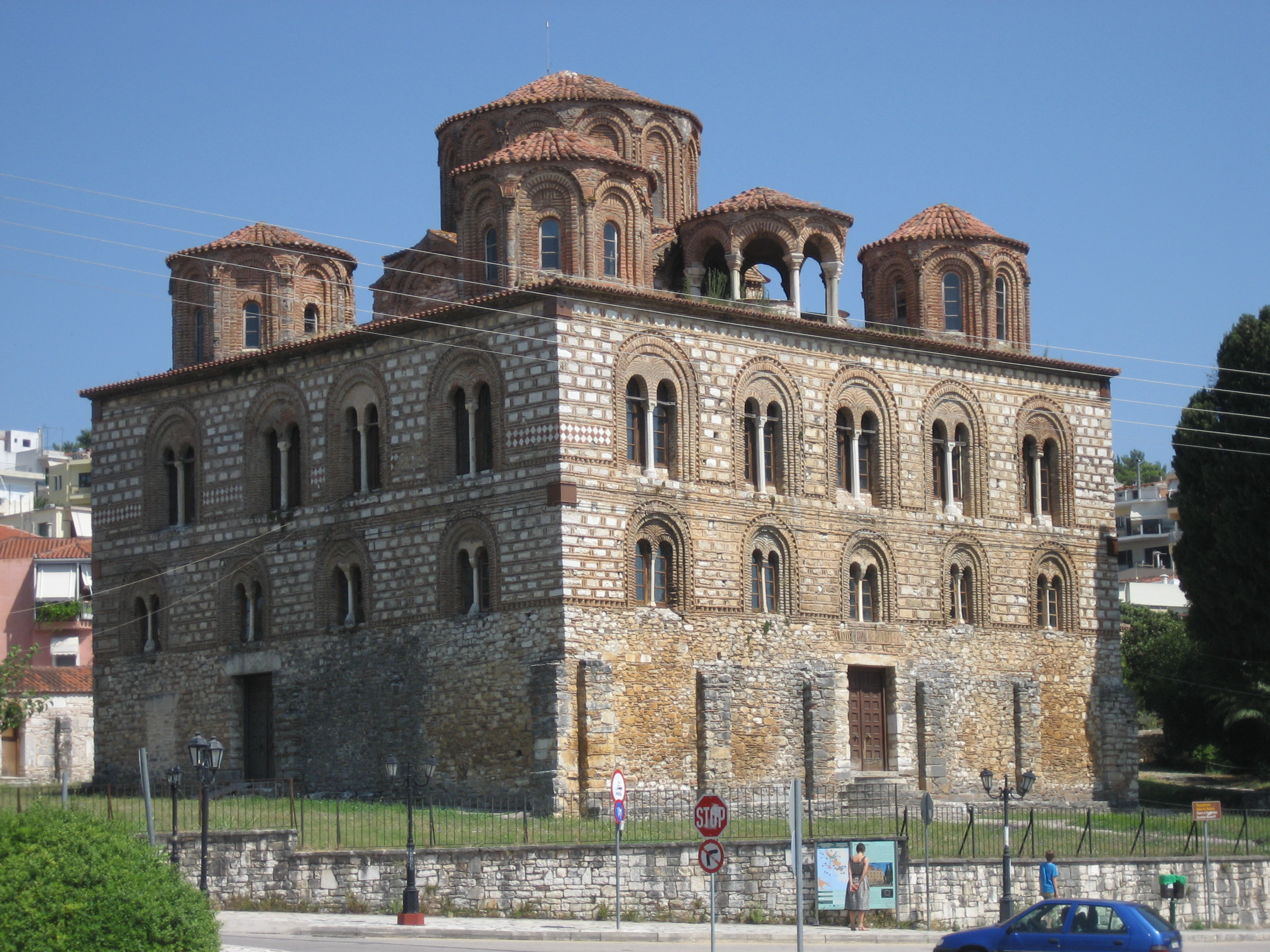
The Church of the Parigoritissa in Arta, Greece

In the Despotate of Epirus, the church of St. Nicholas in Mesopotam (first third of the 13th century) was built with two identical naoi and two apses, like the earlier church of Üçayak. Although it has been called "the finest expression of the regional Epirote architectural paradigm", it has been remodeled over the centuries and is covered by four domes, two over each naos. The two spaces may have been to allow relic visitation by pilgrims to be kept separate from normal liturgical functions.

In the Despotate of Epirus, the Church of the Parigoritissa (1282–9) is the most complex example, with a domed octagon core and domed ambulatory. Columns beneath the dome rest on cantilevered supports and large wooden tie-beams have remained in place to ensure stability. Its eccentric design results in a very high dome with a steep viewing angle, which may explain the unusually large Pantokrator image on the dome. Built in the capital of Arta, its external appearance resembles a cubic palace. The upper level narthex and galleries have five domes, with the middle dome of the narthex an open lantern. This Greek-cross octagon design, similar to the earlier example at Daphni, is one of several among the various Byzantine principalities. Another is found in the Hagia Theodoroi at Mistra (1290–6).

Churches in Epirus with domed narthexes included St. Theodora in Arta (second half of the 13th century), Panagia Vlacherna (narthex added after 1284), and Panagia Vellas (1295-1296). Another church with a domed narthex was the Church of the Virgin Peribleptos in Ohrid (1294-1295).

== Empire of Trebizond ==
The church of Hagia Sophia in the Empire of Trebizond dates to between 1238 and 1263 and has a variation on the quincunx plan. Heavy with traditional detailing from Asia Minor, and possibly Armenian or Georgian influence, the brick pendentives and drum of the dome remain Byzantine.

== Empire of Nicaea and the restored Byzantine Empire ==
After 1261, new church architecture in Constantinople consisted mainly of additions to existing monastic churches, such as the Monastery of Lips and Pammakaristos Church, and as a result the building complexes are distinguished in part by an asymmetric array of domes on their roofs. This effect may have been in imitation of the earlier triple-church Pantokrator monastic complex.

The restored drum of the church of the Agioi Theodoroi (1290-1296) in Mystras has windows that alternate with external niches.

The church of Haghioi Apostoloi in the village of Pyrgi on Chios was built in the 13th or 14th centuries, inspired by the katholikon of Mea Moni.

== See also ==
- List of Roman domes
- History of architecture
