= Menoume Ellada =

- Μένουμε Ελλάδα
- Country of origin: Greece

Production
- Running time: approx. 22 to 26 minutes (30 min with commercials)

Original release
- Network: ERT (ET1, ERT Sat)
- Release: 2006

Μenoume Ellada (Greek: Μένουμε Ελλάδα, translation: "We stay in Greece") is a Greek television series, aired by the Hellenic Broadcasting Corporation. It is aired Monday to Friday at 2pm (EET) on ET1 and 01:00 UTC (00:00 UTC during daylight hours) on ERT World (until November 2006 ERT Sat). This program showcases Greece and all it has to offer. Four teams of reporters scour the country to bring the viewer to various points of interest, from small villages, to historical sites and local culture. The show also features live pictures from 40 different locations via webcams and also provides constantly updated weather conditions for various cities and traffic updates from national and regional road- all on the TV screen. Hosted by Giorgos Amyras & Renia Tsitsibikou.

== Episodes ==
These live locations has filmed famous landmarks and places including (in chronological order), its videos are shown in Greek:

Location	Date of broadcast	Video
Lake Plastiras	-	-
Mount Ainos	January 2006	-
Kitries	February 2006	-
Theodoriana in Arta (regional unit)	early-2006	-
Pramanta, Ioannina (regional unit)	early-2006	-
Kato Vasiliki, Aetolia-Acarnania	early-2006	-
Kryoneri in Aetolia-Acarnania	early-2006	-
Zakynthos	mid-2006	-
Sifnos	mid-2006	-
Chania	mid-2006	-
Seta, Euboea	June 2006	link
Avlonari, Euboea	June 2006	link
A village near Florina	June 2006	-
Florina Folklore Museum	June 2006	-
Palaiokastritsa, Corfu	June 2006	link
Ai Gordi, Corfu	June 2006	link
Rhodes	June 2006	-
Rhodes Gulf Course	June 2006	-
Agia	December 2006	-
Lampeia	December 6, 2006	link
Mainalo	February 2007	-
Mount Olympus	late-January 2008	-
Samothrace / Hiking	June 2008	-
Samothrace / Rafting	June 2008	-
Kamariotissa on Samothrace	June 2008	-
Northern Alonnisos	June 2008	-
Southern Alonnisos and Patatiri	June 2008	-
Alonia on Samothrace	June 2008	-
Agios Andreas, Katakolo	June/July 2008	-
Therma on Samothrace	June 2008	-
Vineyards of the central Heraklion (regional unit)	July 2008	-
Eastern Skopelos	June/July 2008	-
Northern Skopelos	June/July 2008	-
Western Skopelos	June/July 2008	-
Profitis Ilias on Samothrace	July 2008	
Southern Skopelos	July 2008	-
Somewhere on Amorgos	July 2008	-
Ano Meria on Samothrace	July 2008	-
Katavothres and Lassi, Cephalonia	July 2008	-
Aigina - Downtown and a horse trip	July 2008	-
Elafonisi in SW Crete	July 2008	-
Fanari Rhodope (regional unit)	July 2008	-
Mouresi in Magnesia	July 2008	-
Litochoro	July 2008	-
Vamos	July 2008	-
Southern Skiathos	July 2008?	-
Marathia in Phocis	July 2008	-
Monastiri in Phocis	July 2008	-
