= Massacre of Samothrace (1821) =

1821 massacre of Greeks during the Greek War of Independence

- Part of the Greek War of Independence
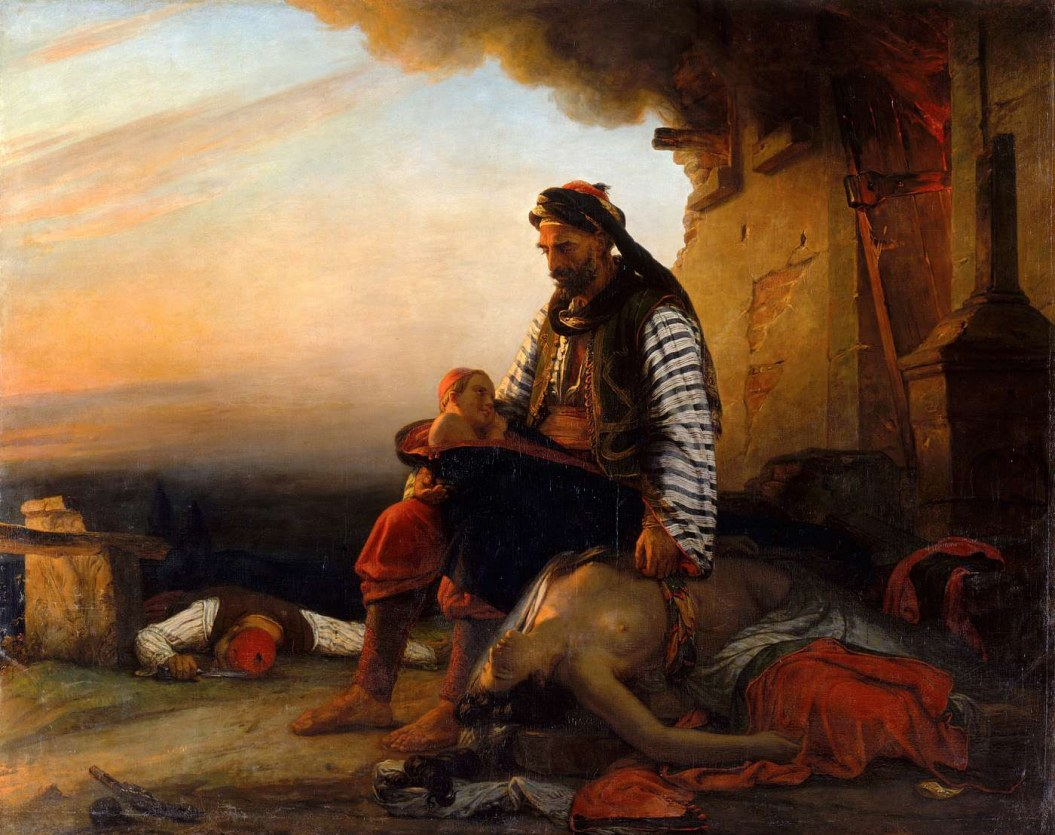
- The Massacre of Samothrace by Auguste Vinchon
- Location: 40.29°N 25.31°E; Samothrace
- Date: 1 September 1821
- Target: Greeks
- Victims: c. 2,000 killed 1,800–2,000 enslaved
- Perpetrator: Ottoman Army

The Massacre of Samothrace (Greek: Ολοκαύτωμα της Σαμοθράκης, romanized: Holocaust of Samothrace) was the mass murder and enslavement of the Greek population of the island of Samothrace. Following the outbreak of the Greek War of Independence, the Samothracians rose in revolt against the local Ottoman authorities. On 1 September 1821, an Ottoman punitive expedition under the Castellan of Dardanelles Mehmet Pasha arrived at the island. After suppressing the uprising, the Ottoman troops killed or enslaved most of island's population.

Five Samothracians who refused to convert to Islam in the aftermath of the massacre were recognized as neomartyrs by the Greek Orthodox Church. Samothrace was awarded the golden medal of the Academy of Athens for its contribution to the Greek War of Independence.

== Background ==
Towards the end of the 18th century Samothrace began to flourish economically. Its limited resources, remote location and the absence of a safe harbor that could be used year-round led the Ottomans to largely leave the local Greek population to their own devices. The subsequent increase in agricultural production, led to a growth of the island's population and raised the overall quality of life. According to Sofi Papageorgiou, at the time of the outbreak of the Greek War of Independence, the population of the Island numbered from approximately 4,000 to over 10,000 inhabitants.

A number of Samothracian prokritoi had joined the Filiki Eteria prior to the outbreak of the rebellion and made preparations for the island to join the upcoming revolt. In April 1821, news of the rising in Peloponnese reached Samothrace. The prokritoi then convinced the Samothracians to declare independence and refuse to pay taxes to the Ottomans. At the same time, a Samiot who lived on the island began training local youths in marksmanship. The rebels overthrew the Ottoman authorities and arrested all the Ottomans residing on the island. However, the island's isolation from the Greek mainland and the absence of a local ammunition production capability had created unfavorable conditions for a potential insurgency. On the other hand, its proximity to the Ottoman naval facilities in the Hellespont meant that the Ottomans were capable of rapidly deploying large bodies of troops to the island. The Ottoman government did not immediately respond to the revolt on Samothrace as it was more concerned with the larger scale risings in mainland Greece, nevertheless it was later decided that the Samothracians merited exemplary punishment.

== Massacre ==
In August 1821, an Ottoman fleet set sail from the Hellespont towards Samothrace. On 1 September, 1,000 to 2,000 Ottoman troops under Mehmed Pasha, the Castellan of the Dardanelles landed at Makrylies and then proceeded towards Chora, the island's largest town. The vastly outnumbered rebels took positions on the Koukou and Vrychou heights, firing upon the Ottomans once the latter reached Myloi. Offering stiff resistance for many hours, until they ran out of ammunition and retreated towards the island's mountainous interior. Ottoman losses amounted to 23 soldiers killed, including their standard-bearer and 32 wounded. Upon conquering Chora, the Ottomans descended into other populated areas and began to systematically massacre almost everyone they encountered, while enslaving others (mainly children) who were destined to be sold at Constantinople's and Smyrna's slave markets. The Ottomans looted the villages and took away the cattle before setting them aflame. Twelve people were hanged from the masts of the Ottoman ships in order to instill fear in the survivors.

Those who managed to escape sought refuge in the mountains. The Ottomans employed a turncoat named Kyriakos who convinced many of the survivors that they would be amnestied. The Ottomans enslaved the women and children and brought approximately 700 men underneath a Byzantine fortress at Efka where they were massacred. Most of the killed rebels were beheaded. Mehmed Pasha captured three ships and sent prisoners, heads & ears taken during the battle to Istanbul. The heads of the rebels were subsequently tossed on the ground in front of the Topkapi Palace Gate. He subsequently received a congratulatory Imperial letter for his services.

== Aftermath ==
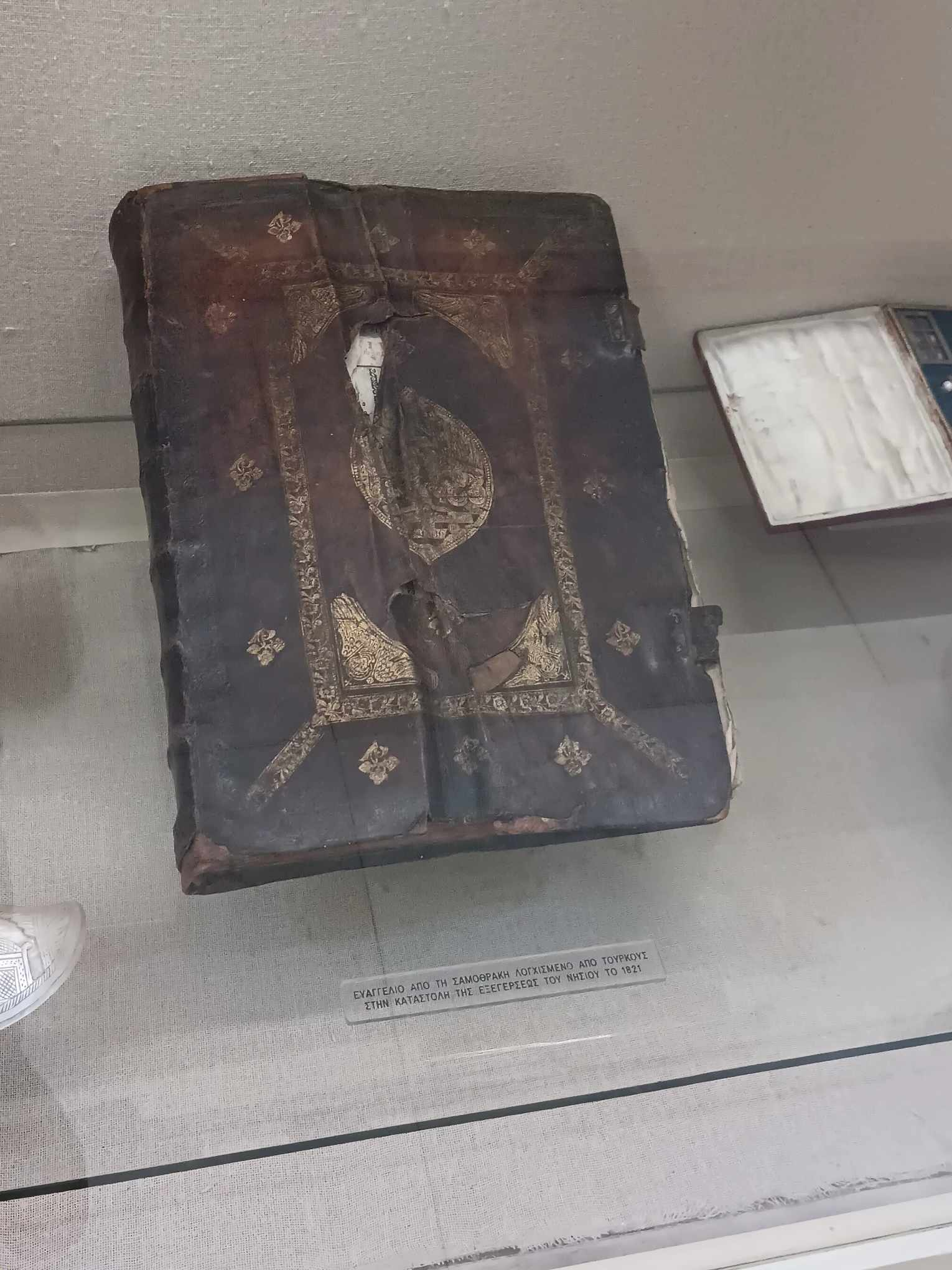
Bible bayoneted by Ottoman soldiers during the massacre

The remaining Greeks after accepting the amnesty terms of the Ottoman Empire were granted pardon in April 1822. The American philhellene George Jarvis visited the island on 13 July 1822. According to Jarvis the island's population was reduced to 200 people who lived in absolute poverty. The population began to grow again after several years as many Samothracian women were bought out of slavery and returned to their homeland. They subsequently married Greek men from other areas of Greece who began to settle the island. The massacre at Efka led to the creation of the Samothracian proverb: "I am not one of the 700," which means, "I am not easily fooled." The Ottoman Census of 1831 states that there were 430 Greek and 3 Turkish males of fighting age on the island. This registrar did not register women, orphans, Christians below the age of puberty, the mentally or physically incapacitated as well as high - ranking officials, so the actual population would be much higher.

Approximately 70-80 Greeks from Samothrace fled to Mount Athos and have submitted themselves to the gatekeeper of the Mutasarrif of Thessaloniki Ebulubud Mehmed Emin Pasha. Five of the captives brought by the Ottomans to Constantinople converted to Islam, but recanted their beliefs and returned to Christianity after they were bought out of slavery by European philhellenes and returned to Samothrace in 1837. Upon learning about their apostasy, the Ottomans took them to Makri where they were tortured and subsequently executed. The five Samothracians were named Manouel Palogoudas, Michael Kyprios, Theodoros Dimitriou Kalakou, Georgios Kourounis and Georgios became neomartyrs. In 1843, a monk named Iakovos wrote an acolouthia in honor of the Samothrace neomartyrs. It has since been regularly performed on the island, in Makri and in the Mount Athos monasteries on their feast day, Saint Thomas' Sunday (the seventh day after Orthodox Easter). The remains of the saints were initially taken from Makri to Mount Athos but were returned to Samothrace by July 1906.

The Ottomans tore or burned the books they found during the course of the massacre. A bayoneted bible was recovered by the survivors from the ruins of the Chora village church. It was rediscovered by Ion Dragoumis in Nikolaos Fardys' library during his visit to Samothrace in July 1906. Dragoumis donated the bible to the National Historical Museum, Athens, which houses it in its collection to this day. On 23 March 1980, the Academy of Athens awarded Samothrace its golden medal in recognition of its contribution to the Greek War of Independence.

== Sources ==
- Dragoumis, Ion (1926). Σαμοθράκη [Samothrace] (in Greek). Athens: Nea Zoi Alexandreias.
- Euthymiadis, Apostolos (2002). Η συμβολή της Θράκης εις τους απελευθερωτικούς αγώνας του Έθνους : (από του 1361 μέχρι του 1920) [Thrace's Contribution to the Nation's Liberation Struggle: (from 1361 to 1920)] (in Greek). Alexandroupoli: Aigaio. ISBN 9607092813.
- Ilıcak, H. Şükrü (2021). Those Infidel Greeks: The Greek War of Independence through Ottoman Archival Documents. Leiden: Brill. ISBN 9789004471306.
- Karpat, Kemal (1985). Ottoman Population, 1830-1914, Demographic and Social Characteristics. Madison: The University of Wisconsin Press. ISBN 0299091600.
- Papageorgiou, Sofi (1982). Σαμοθράκη : Ἱστορία τοῦ νησιοῦ ἀπό τά πρῶτα χριστιανικά χρόνια ὡς τό 1914 [Samothrace: The History of the Island from the First Christian Years to 1914] (in Greek). Athens: Syllogos pros Diadosin ton Ellinikon Grammaton.
