= Fengari =

Mountain in Greece

- Φεγγάρι
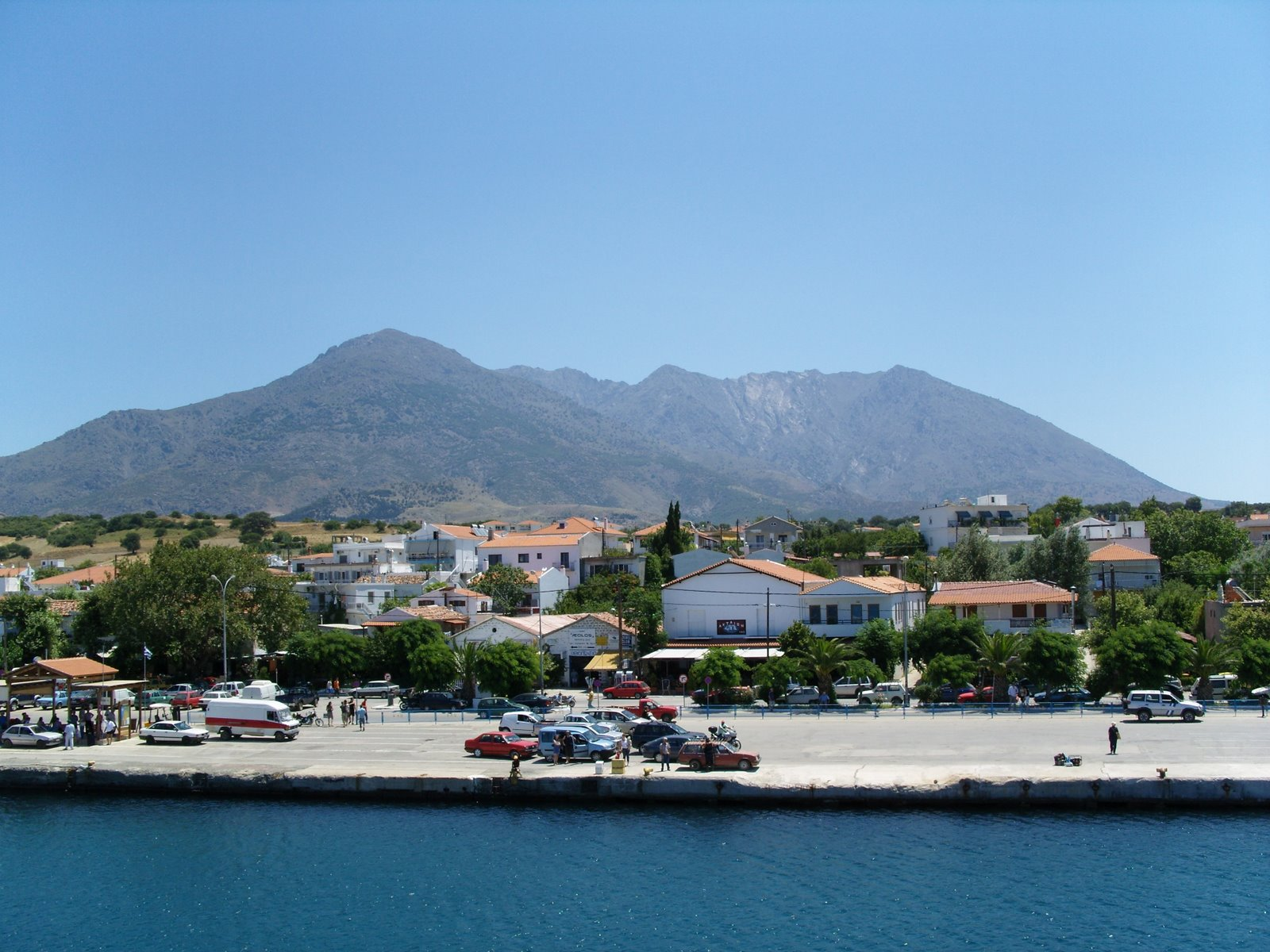

Highest point
- Elevation: 1,611 m (5,285 ft)
- Prominence: 1,611 m (5,285 ft)
- Listing: Ultra
- Coordinates: 40°27′29.45″N 25°33′31.66″E

Naming
- English translation: Moon
- Language of name: Greek

Geography
- Location within Greece
- Location: Samothrace, Greece

Climbing
- Easiest route: Hiking

Fengari (Greek: Φεγγάρι, lit. 'Moon'), also known as Saos (Greek: Σάος), is the tallest mountain in the Aegean island of Samothrace, Greece, with an elevation of 1,611 metres (5,285 ft).

== Etymology ==
The previous name of the mountain, Sáos, which means safe, is still used in some maps. The current common name, though, is Fengari or Fenghári, which means moon.

According to a local legend, anyone who stands at the top of the mountain during the night of a full moon will see something that they wish for coming true.

== History ==
During classical antiquity, this mountain was very useful for sailors' navigation, due to its relative height and prominence. In legend, Poseidon watched the Trojan War from the peak.

== Access to the summit ==
The easiest way to access the Fengari summit is via the northern side of the mountain, from the village of Therma. Near the summit, the path becomes extremely rocky, and rocks are marked by red spray paint to help keep hikers on track. During the summer, this area can contain considerable cloud and mist. On clear days, though, the view from this area includes a large part of the northern Aegean Sea and stretches from the Troad in the East to Mount Athos in the West.

== Environment ==
Due its height and the diversity of its climate, many very interesting and rare plant species can be found on Fengari. On its cliffs and gorges, for example, Polygonum icaricum can be found; the species only grows in Samothrace and in Icaria. Several subspecies of Potentilla montana also grow near the top of the mountain. In addition, the mountain contains a very rich and diverse variety of bird life. Other plants endemic to Mount Fengari include Alyssum degenianum, Symphyandra samothracica, Herniaria degenii, and Potentilla geoides.

== See also ==
- List of European ultra prominent peaks
