= Theodorus of Athamania =

Theodorus of Athamania (Greek: Θεοδώρος Αθαμανίας) was king of the Athamanians in south-eastern Epirus. He is known otherwise only from the Delian temple inventories: his daughter Phila made dedications there before 225 BC. In 250 BC, King Theodorus founded the city of Theodoria, now known as the municipal unit of Theodoriana, part of the municipality of Central Tzoumerka. He died before 220 BC and was succeeded by Amynander of Athamania.
