= Therma (disambiguation) =

Therma was a Greek city founded by Eretrians or Corinthians in late 7th century BC in ancient Mygdonia.

Therma may also refer to:

- Thermi, the modern municipality near Thessaloniki, Greece
- Therma (Icaria), the ancient town of Icaria
- Termini Imerese, the ancient city in Sicily
- Therma, Samothrace, a village in Greece
- Thermae, Roman baths
