= Serrheum (Samothrace) =

Serrheum or Serreion (Ancient Greek: Σέρρειον) was a town on the island of Samothrace mentioned by Stephanus of Byzantium.
