= Athamanians =

Ancient Greek tribe

Epirus and environs.

Athamanians or Athamanes (Greek: Ἀθαμάνες, Athamanes) were an ancient Greek tribe that inhabited south-eastern Epirus and west Thessaly. Today, the municipal unit of Athamania in Central Tzoumerka and the community of Athamania in Pyli are named after them.

== History ==
Although they were regarded as "barbarians" by Strabo and Hecataeus of Miletus, the Athamanians affirmed that they were Greeks and they were also seen as Greeks by Plato who stated "the descendants of Athamas are Greek, of course" (Οι έκγονοι του Αθάμαντος, Έλληνες γάρ). In addition, modern scholarship considers the Athamanians to have been a Greek tribe. The existence of Greek myths about Athamas and Ino in Achaean Phthiotis suggests that the Athamanians were settled there before 1600 BC. They were an independent tribe (except during their subjugation by Pyrrhus of Epirus in 281–272 BC and by the Macedonians in 191 BC), and were occasionally allies of the Aetolians. Amynander and Theodorus of Athamania are reported kings of the Athamanians.

== Timeline ==
1330 BC	Athamas becomes King of the Minyans in Boeotia.
1300 BC	Athamas is cast away from his kingdom in Boeotia submitting to an oracle commanding that he should inhabit a wild and mountainous place. He thus reaches the Pindos mountains, where he marries Themisto, daughter of Ypseus and Kreousa, and becomes the founder of Athamania and Patriarch of the Athamanians.
1100 BC	The invading Dorians are unable to conquer the Athamanians who are fierce warriors.
1050 BC	Athamania is divided into four (4) territories, Heracleia, Argithea, Tetraphylia, and Chalkis.
c. 400 BC	Athamanians are recognized as Greeks by Plato: Οι έκγονοι του Αθάμαντος, Έλληνες γάρ. ("The descendants of Athamas, are Greeks of course.") Athamanians become allies of the Spartans.
395 BC	Athamanians dissolve their alliance to Sparta and become allies of the Athenians, Boeotians, Thessalians and others.
375 BC	Athamanians participate in the 2nd Athenian Alliance.
355 BC	Athamanians become allies of the Macedonians, Thessalians against the Phocaeans in the 3rd Holy War.
323 BC	Athamanians become allies of the Athenians against the Macedonians.
281–272 BC	King Pyrrhus of Epirus conquers the Athamanians.
250 BC	King Theodorus of the Athamanians builds the city of Theodoria (today's Theodoriana).
220–178 BC	Reign of King Amynander, the golden age of the Athamanians.
191 BC	Athamania is conquered by the Macedonians. King Amynander escapes to Ambrakia along with Queen Apamia and their children.
190/189 BC (Winter)	King Amynander returns and frees Athamania from the Macedonians.
178 BC	King Selipos, the last king of the Athamanians, heroically resists the Romans. The city of Selipiana, probably built long after his death, is named after him and his ancient name survives intact in his city for more than two millennia until 1930 when it is changed to Kataphyli, after the name of the rock (Kataphylion) on which King Selipos's palace was built by Presidential Decree.
168 BC	The Roman Legions under Aemilius Paulus destroy the cities of Athamania.
165 BC	The Commonwealth of the Athamanians devotes a series of bronze statues to the Delphian Oracle in honor of archon Cassander of Menestheus (no connection to Cassander of Antipatrus of Macedonia).
164–63 BC	The Commonwealth of the Athamanians disintegrates, most of the population emigrates to Aitolia, Thessaly, and Epirus. Only a few Athamanians remain inhabiting the region up to modern times, their cities deteriorating into small villages but still bearing their ancient names.

== See also ==
- Aetolians
- List of Ancient Greek tribes
- Molossians
- Northwest Greek

== Sources ==
- Christopoulos, George A.; Bastias, John C. (1974) [1970]. "Athamanians". History of the Hellenic World: Prehistory and Protohistory. University Park, Pennsylvania: The Pennsylvania State University Press. pp. 385–386. ISBN 0-271-01199-8.
- Cross, Geoffrey Neale (1932). Epirus: A Study in Greek Constitutional Development. Cambridge, United Kingdom: Cambridge University Press.
- Rigsby, Kent J. (1996). Asylia: Territorial Inviolability in the Hellenistic World. Berkeley and Los Angeles, California: University of California Press. ISBN 0520200985.
