= Theodoriana =

Theodoriana Θεοδώριανα
- Municipal unit
- Location within the regional unit

- Location within Greece
- Coordinates: 39°26′N 21°13′E
- Country: Greece
- Administrative region: Epirus
- Regional unit: Arta
- Municipality: Central Tzoumerka

Area
  - Municipal unit: 44.4 km^{2} (17.1 sq mi)

Population (2021)
  - Municipal unit: 348
  - Municipal unit density: 7.84/km^{2} (20.3/sq mi)
- Time zone: UTC+2 (EET)
  - Summer (DST): UTC+3 (EEST)
- Postal code: 470 45
- Vehicle registration: ΑΤ

Theodoriana (Greek: Θεοδώριανα) is a village and former community in the Arta regional unit, Epirus, Greece. Since the 2011 local government reform, it is part of the municipality, Central Tzoumerka, of which it is a municipal unit. The municipal unit has an area of 44.398 km^{2}. In 2011 its population was 348 for the community (including the village Skarpari). Northeast is the Trikala regional unit. The Pindos and the Athamanian mountains cross the northeastern part. The Acheloos river flows by the village along with the EO30 road (Arta–Trikala).

The entire area of Theodoriana are mountains and pine trees along with forests dominate the whole municipality except for the upper parts and the valley areas where farmlands are located. Some of its residents live only during the summer months and leave during the winter months. In March 2006, the village and the area was featured on an episode of Travelling in Greece (Menoume Ellada) on ERT.

== History ==
It was founded in 250 BC as Theodoria by Theodorus of Athamania.

In 1793, the historic Monastery of Panagia was built, where during the Turkish occupation it is said that a secret school operated and part of it was turned into a makeshift hospital and a refuge for resistance fighters.

Since 1997, Theodorians were against the construction of hydroelectric dams in the two main rivers of the village by Michaniki SA and Terna Energy SA. In the end, only one of them was built, while for the rest, after a decision of the CoC, their construction was prevented.

In 2011, during the local government reform, it merged with Agnanta, Athamania, and Melissourgoi to form the municipality of Central Tzoumerka.

== Population ==
Year	Village	Community
1981	442	-
1991	779	-
2001	936	994
2011	163	173
2021	332	348

== Climate ==
According to the data of the network of meteorological stations which belong to the National Observatory of Athens, Theodoriana has a warm-summer Mediterranean climate (Köppen climate classification: Csb) and records the highest average annual precipitation in Greece with 2529 mm .

Climate data for Theodoriana 962 m a.s.l. (2009-2023)
Month	Jan	Feb	Mar	Apr	May	Jun	Jul	Aug	Sep	Oct	Nov	Dec	Year
Mean daily maximum °C (°F)	6.7 (44.1)	8.6 (47.5)	11.1 (52.0)	15.7 (60.3)	19.8 (67.6)	24.6 (76.3)	28.1 (82.6)	28.4 (83.1)	23.3 (73.9)	18.1 (64.6)	13.4 (56.1)	9.0 (48.2)	17.2 (63.0)
Daily mean °C (°F)	3.1 (37.6)	4.6 (40.3)	6.5 (43.7)	10.5 (50.9)	14.3 (57.7)	18.5 (65.3)	21.4 (70.5)	21.7 (71.1)	17.6 (63.7)	13.1 (55.6)	9.3 (48.7)	5.2 (41.4)	12.2 (53.9)
Mean daily minimum °C (°F)	−0.5 (31.1)	0.6 (33.1)	1.9 (35.4)	5.3 (41.5)	8.8 (47.8)	12.4 (54.3)	14.7 (58.5)	15.0 (59.0)	11.8 (53.2)	8.1 (46.6)	5.1 (41.2)	1.4 (34.5)	7.1 (44.7)
Average precipitation mm (inches)	413.8 (16.29)	304.7 (12.00)	225.8 (8.89)	153.7 (6.05)	131.7 (5.19)	96.7 (3.81)	45.5 (1.79)	42.8 (1.69)	138.4 (5.45)	213.6 (8.41)	381.6 (15.02)	380.6 (14.98)	2,528.9 (99.57)
Source 1: National Observatory of Athens Monthly Bulletins (Dec 2009 - Dec 2023)
Source 2: Theodoriana N.O.A station and World Meteorological Organization
