= Melissourgoi =

Melissourgoi Μελισσουργοί
- Municipal unit
- Location within the regional unit

- Location within Greece
- Coordinates: 39°31′N 21°09′E
- Country: Greece
- Administrative region: Epirus
- Regional unit: Arta
- Municipality: Central Tzoumerka

Area
  - Municipal unit: 35.51 km^{2} (13.71 sq mi)

Population (2021)
  - Municipal unit: 264
  - Municipal unit density: 7.43/km^{2} (19.3/sq mi)
- Time zone: UTC+2 (EET)
  - Summer (DST): UTC+3 (EEST)
- Vehicle registration: ΑΤ

Melissourgoi (Greek: Μελισσουργοί, Beekeepers) is a former community in the Arta regional unit, Epirus, in northwestern Greece. Since the 2011 local government reform it is a municipal unit of the Central Tzoumerka municipality. The municipal unit has an area of 35.510 km^{2}, making it the smallest municipal unit in Central Tzoumerka. In 2021, it recorded a population of 264.

== History ==
It was formerly an independent municipality, but in 2011, during the local government reform, it merged with Agnanta, Athamania, and Theodoriana to form the municipality of Central Tzoumerka.

== Notable people ==
- Dimitris Tsovolas (1942-2022), politician
- Ioannis Banias (1939-2012), politician
