= Dikella =

Dikella Δίκελλα
- Settlement
- Location within Greece
- Coordinates: 40°52′N 25°42′E
- Country: Greece
- Administrative region: East Macedonia and Thrace
- Regional unit: Evros
- Municipality: Alexandroupoli
- Municipal unit: Alexandroupoli
- Community: Makri

Population (2021)
  - Total: 152
- Time zone: UTC+2 (EET)
  - Summer (DST): UTC+3 (EEST)
- Vehicle registration: EB

Dikella (Greek: Δίκελλα) is a village in the western part of the municipality of Alexandroupoli, Greece. It lies near the coast, 15 km west of the city centre and 4 km west of Makri. Its population was 152 in 2021. It is part of the local community of Makri.
