= Agnanta =

Agnanta Άγναντα
- Municipal unit
- Location within the regional unit

- Location within Greece
- Coordinates: 39°28′N 21°05′E
- Country: Greece
- Administrative region: Epirus
- Regional unit: Arta
- Municipality: Central Tzoumerka

Area
  - Municipal unit: 124.3 km^{2} (48.0 sq mi)

Population (2021)
  - Municipal unit: 1,860
  - Municipal unit density: 15.0/km^{2} (38.8/sq mi)
  - Community: 449
- Time zone: UTC+2 (EET)
  - Summer (DST): UTC+3 (EEST)
- Postal code: 470 43
- Vehicle registration: ΑΤ

Agnanta (Greek: Άγναντα) is a village and a former municipality in the Arta regional unit, Epirus, Greece. Since the 2011 local government reform, it is part of the municipality Central Tzoumerka, of which it is a municipal unit. The municipal unit has an area of 124.344 km^{2}. Agnanta is one of the largest villages of the Tzoumerka region. The population of the municipal unit is 1,860 (2021). It is located at a distance of 55 km north of the city of Arta and east of the city of Ioannina. The geographical center of the village has an altitude of 650–700 m, while some of its highest districts approach an altitude of 1000 m. The name Agnanta has its origin in the Greek adverb agnantia, which means across (agnantevo means look across, watch/look from far).

== History ==
There are no documents or written evidence to certify exactly when Agnanta first appeared as an organized community. The first preserved written evidence is a TAPU (Turkish title deed) from 1729, which refers to properties and forest regions of Agnanta. It is likely that an organized village existed much earlier and probably since the early decades of the 17th century, when populations moved from other areas towards Tzoumerka due to indictments and diseases in other areas.

In 2011, during the local government reform, it merged with Athamania, Melissourgoi, and Theodoriana to form the municipality of Central Tzoumerka.

== Natural characteristics ==
The key characteristics of the village are its abundant vegetation and its natural springs. In its dense forests, a variety of trees, mainly fir, maple and pine, are found. Agnanta's vegetation composes an uninhibited natural landscape of a rich variety of colors, lighting and glint, which transform fully with the seasons.

== Entertainment ==
Entertainment and dining options include several traditional restaurants (taverns), café-bars and nightclubs. There are also hotels located in the center of the village and a hotel located in the region of Plaka with Plaka Bridge, approximately 15 km away from the village. A variety of outdoor activities are offered by the hotel owners and other companies including rafting, canoeing and hiking.
