= Makri, Evros =

Makri Μάκρη
- Community
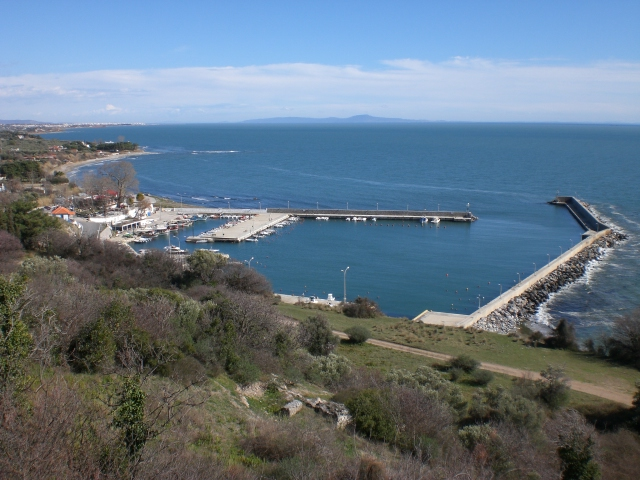
- Village harbour

- Location within Greece
- Coordinates: 40°51′N 25°45′E
- Country: Greece
- Administrative region: East Macedonia and Thrace
- Regional unit: Evros
- Municipality: Alexandroupolis
- Municipal unit: Alexandroupolis

Population (2021)
  - Community: 1,811
- Time zone: UTC+2 (EET)
  - Summer (DST): UTC+3 (EEST)
- Vehicle registration: EB

Makri (Greek: Μάκρη) is a village and a municipal community of the city of Alexandroupolis, Evros regional unit, Greece. In 2021 its population was 1,811 for the municipal community. It is situated on the Aegean Sea coast, 12 km west of downtown Alexandroupolis. Makri has an exit on the A2 motorway (Egnatia Odos), that passes north of the village.

== Subdivisions ==
- Makri, pop. 924 in 2011
- Dikella, pop. 290
- Ennato, pop. 268
- Koimisi Theotokou, pop. 48
- Mesimvria, pop. 145
- Panorama, pop. 37
- Paralia Dikellon, pop. 102
- Plaka, pop. 105

== Population ==
Year	Village population	Population community
1981	-	1,334
1991	738	-
2001	820	1,674
2011	924	1,919
2021	790	1,811

== History ==
Makri was ruled by the Ottoman Empire until the Balkan Wars of 1912 under the name Miri. It became a part of Bulgaria after 1912. In 1920 it became a part of Greece, and in 1941–1944 it was re-occupied by Bulgarian forces during the Axis Occupation of Greece.

== Gallery ==
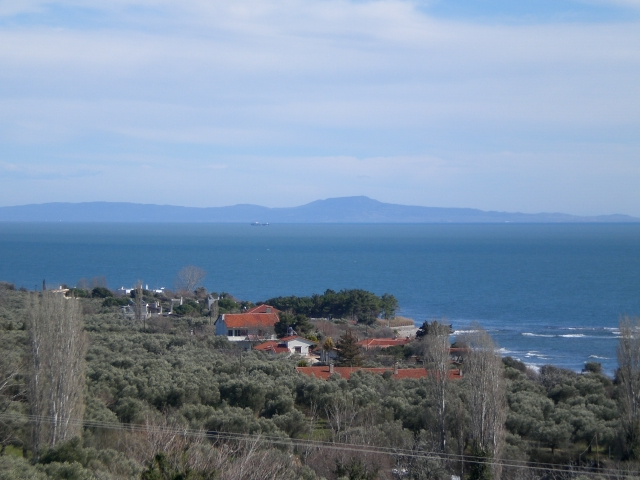
View over Makri

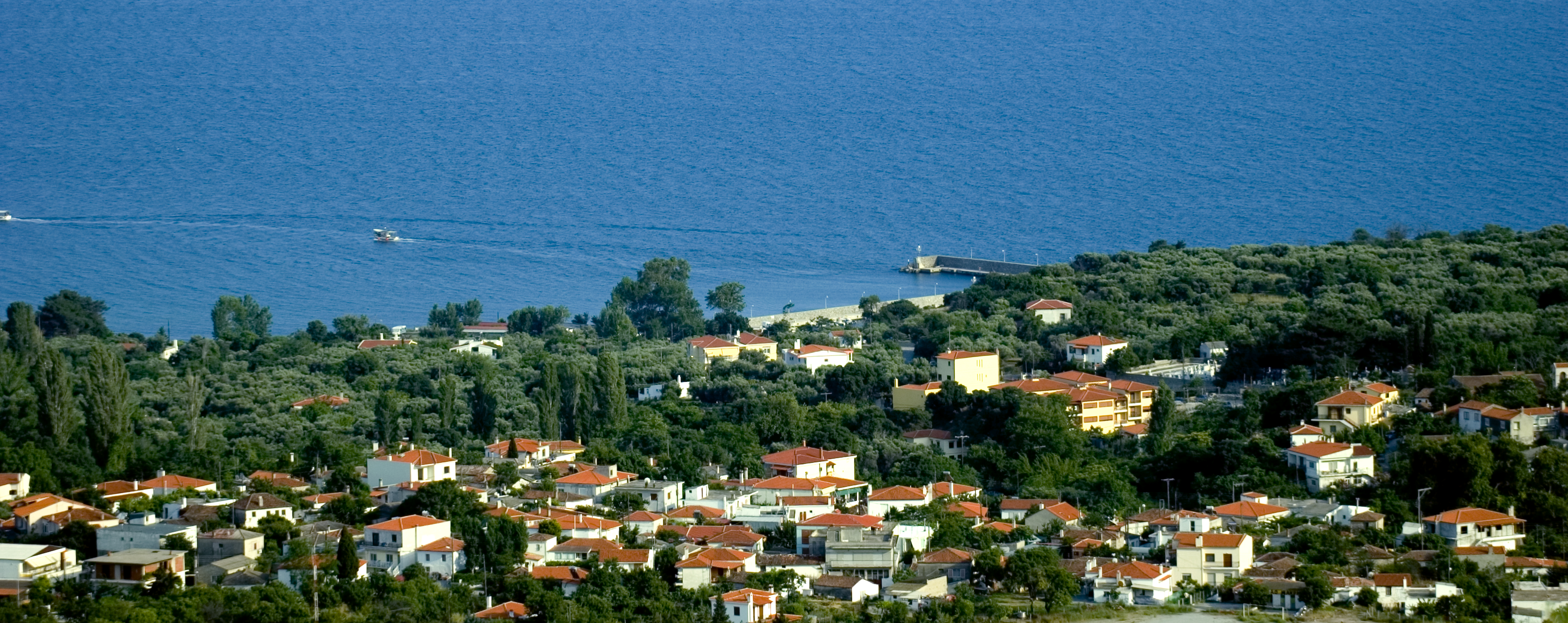
View from nearby hill

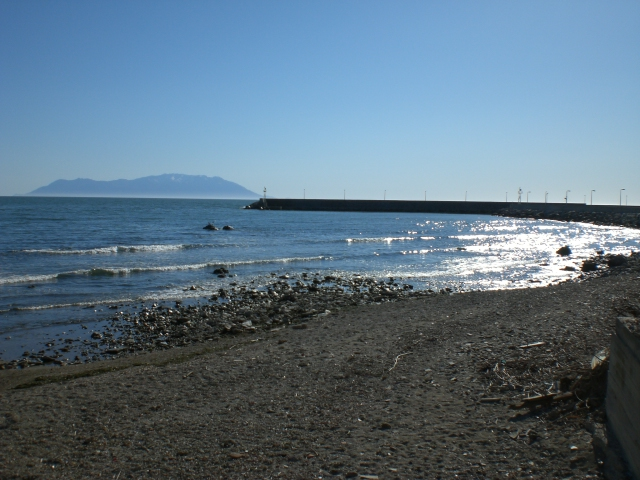
Coastline

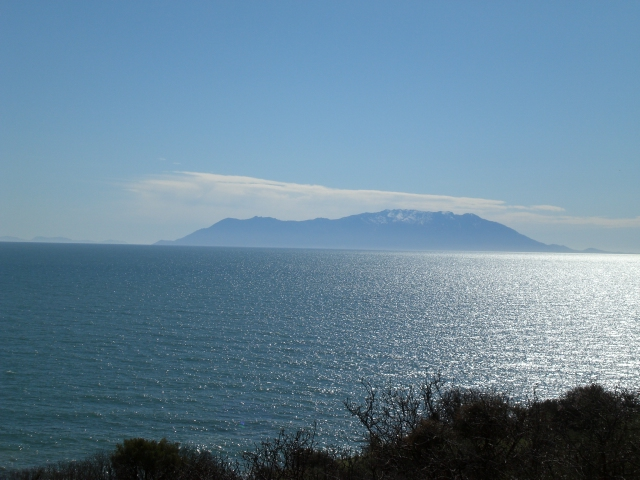
View of Samothraki from Makri

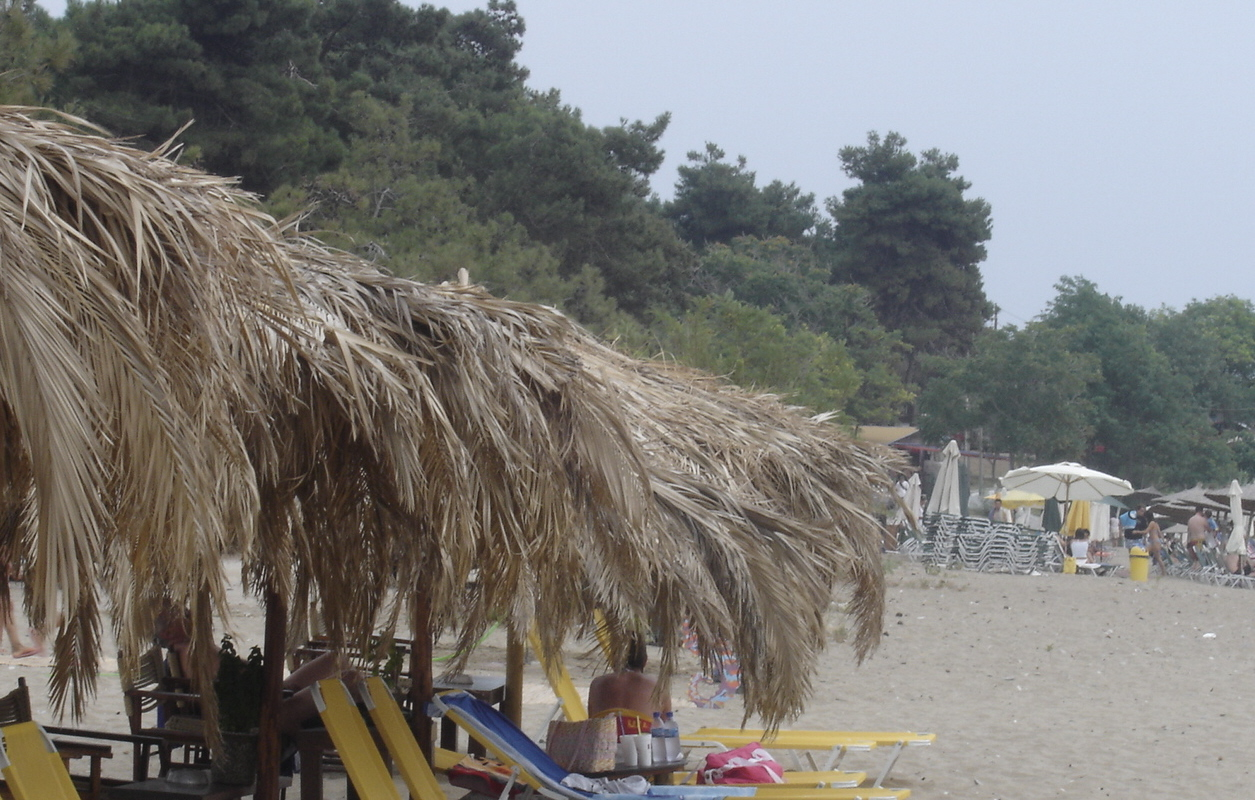
Beach in summer time

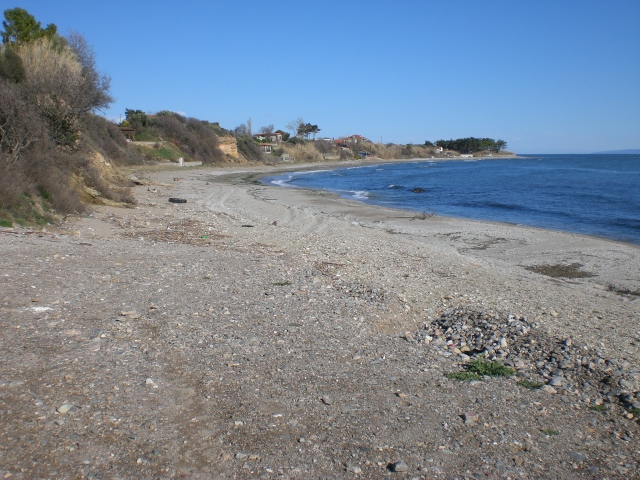
Beach in spring

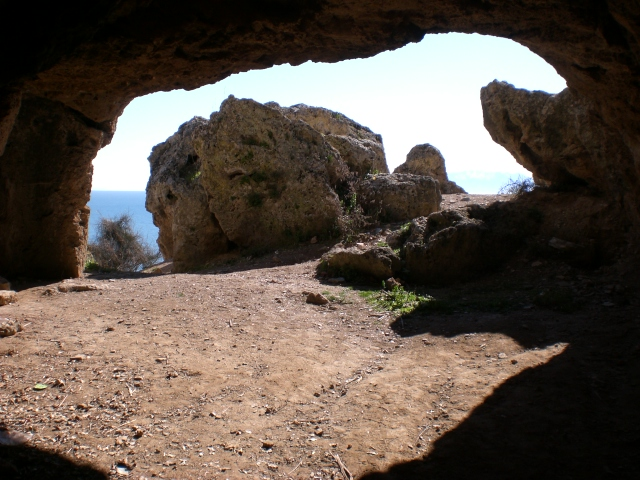
Cyclops Cave

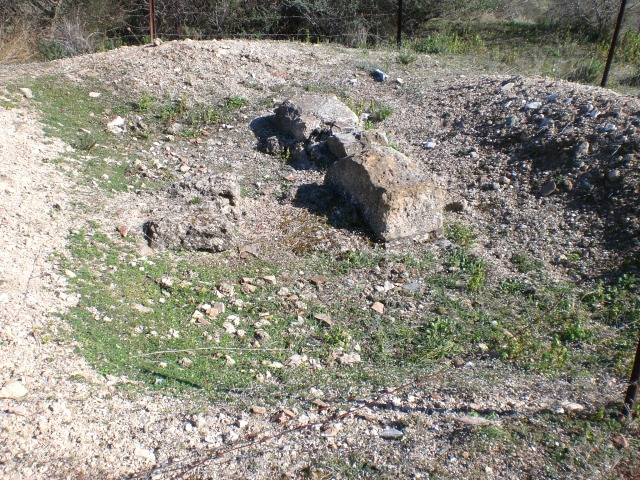
Ruins of Byzantine church

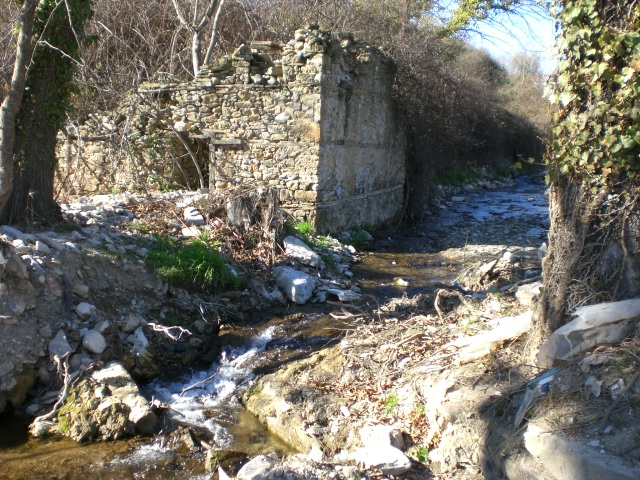
Stream that runs through the village

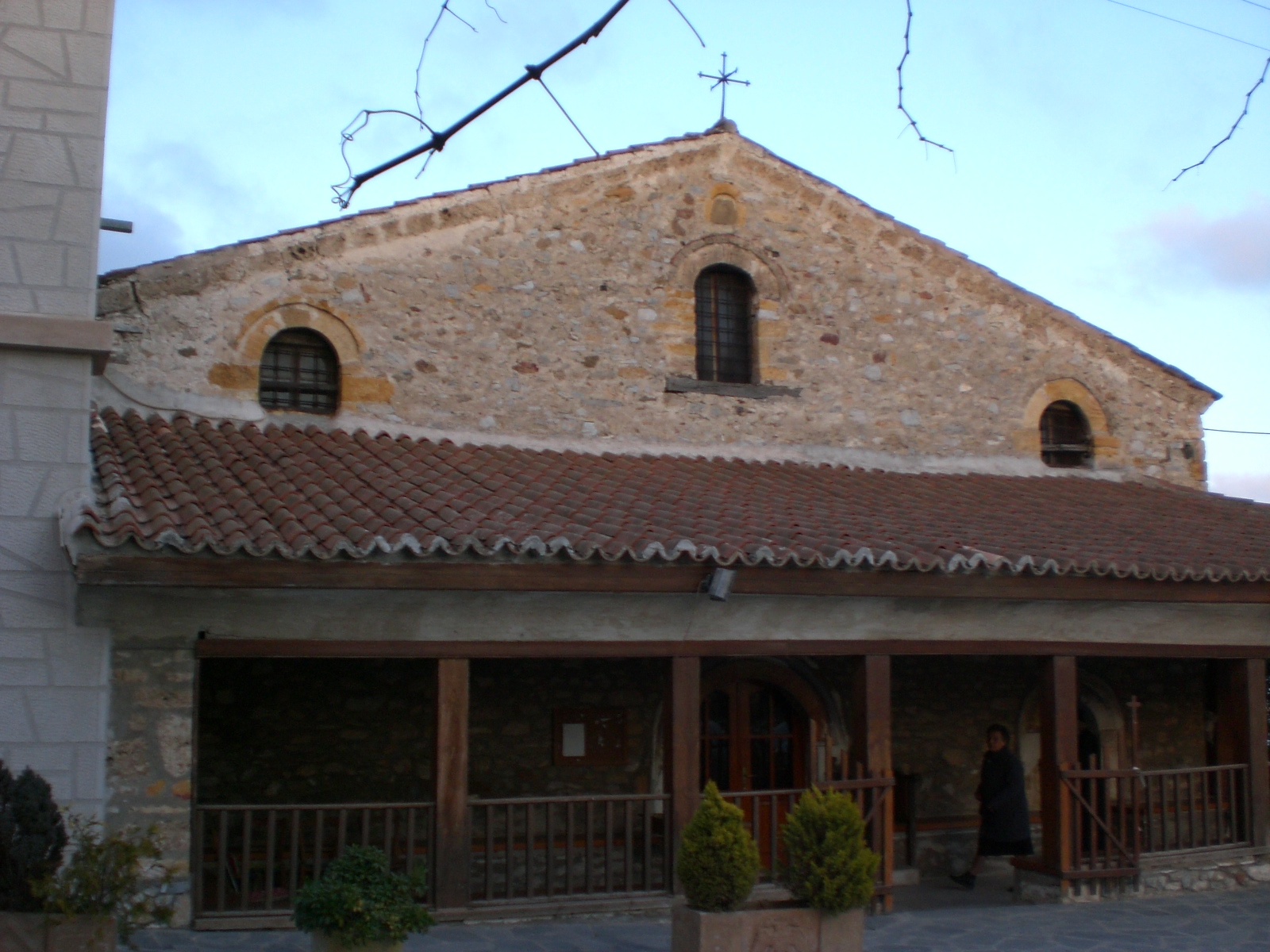
Church exterior

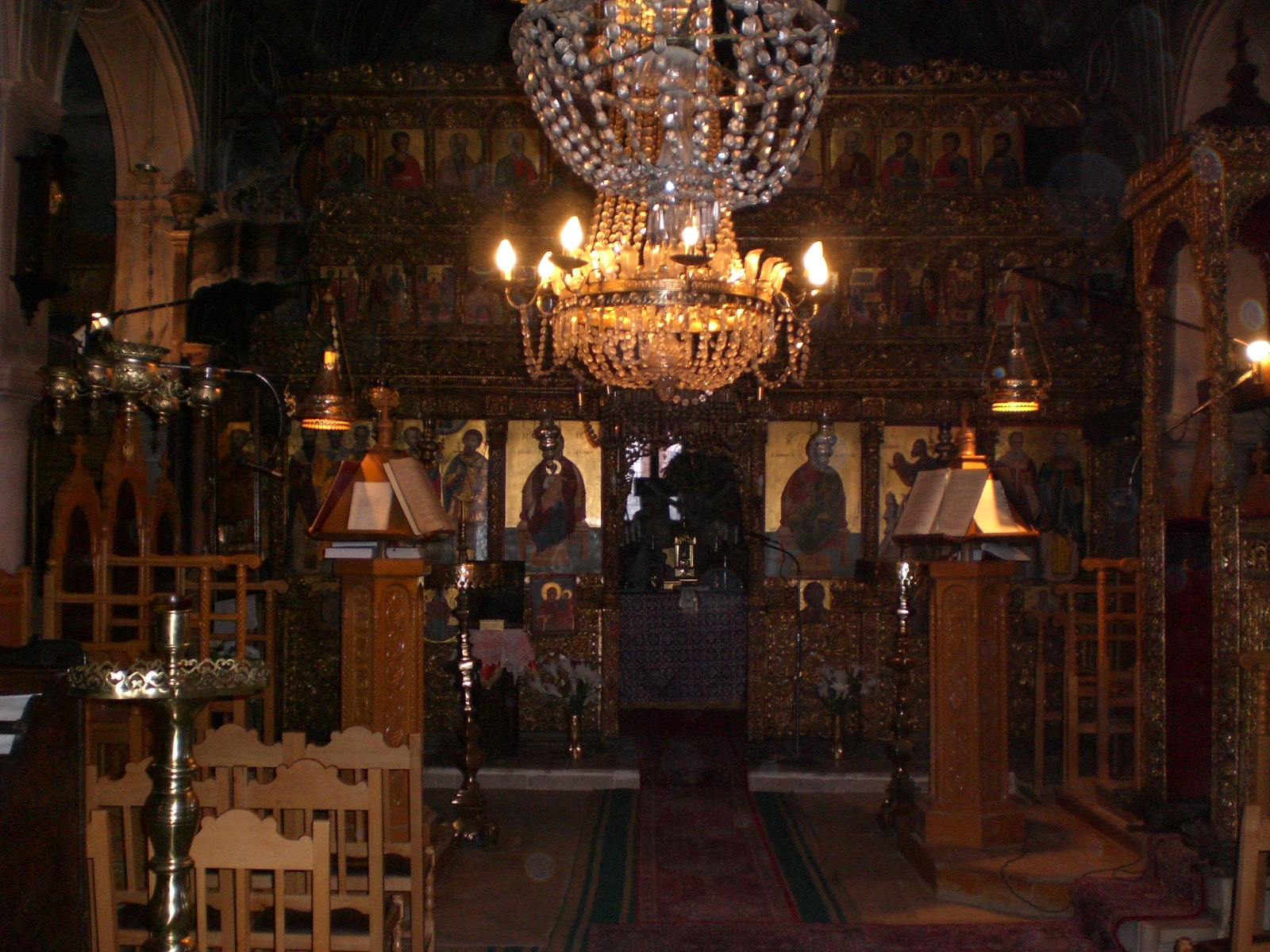
Church interior

== See also ==
- List of settlements in the Evros regional unit
