= Vourgareli =

Vourgareli Βουργαρέλι
- Community
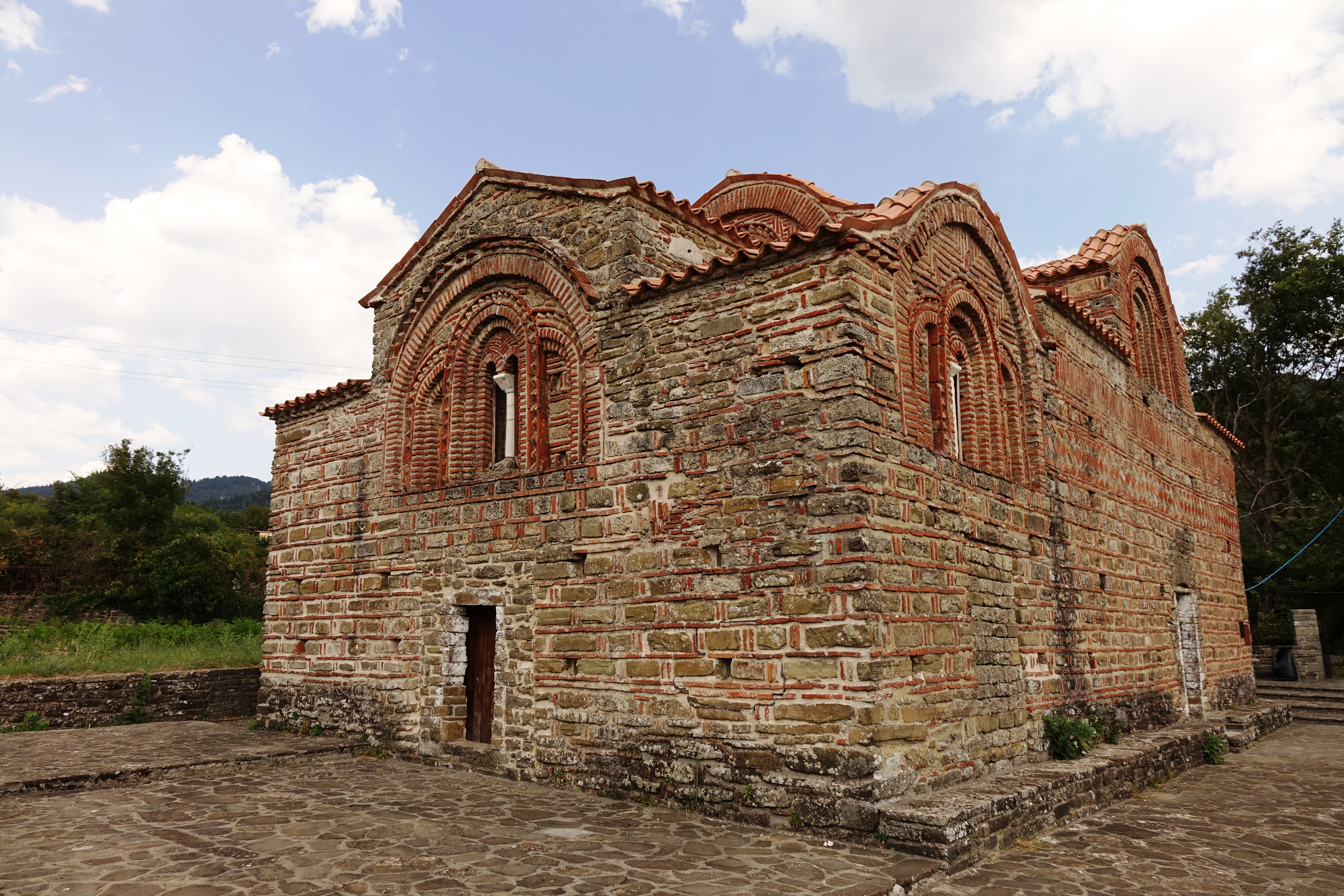
- The red church in Vourgareli

- Location within Greece
- Coordinates: 39°22′18″N 21°11′00″E
- Country: Greece
- Administrative region: Epirus
- Regional unit: Arta
- Municipality: Central Tzoumerka

Population (2021)
  - Community: 466
- Time zone: UTC+2 (EET)
  - Summer (DST): UTC+3 (EEST)
- Vehicle registration: ΑΤ

Vourgareli (Greek: Βουργαρέλι) is a village and a community in Arta prefecture, northern Greece. It is located in the north-east of Arta prefecture, built at a height of 900 meters in the slope of Tzoumerka Mountains. The village is the seat of Central Tzoumerka municipality and Athamania municipal unit. Its population is 466 inhabitants according to the 2021 census.

The symbol and monument of the village is the Red Church.

== History ==
Vourgareli is initially referred in a Venetian document of 1696. The derivation of this name is unknown. It is believed that it derives from local lumberjack named Vourgarelis or from Bulgarian lumberjacks that were settled in this area in the past.

In the late of 18th century the Souliote chieftain Giorgos Botsaris and other 170 Souliote families were settled in Vourgareli. After the fall of Souli to Ali Pasha in 1803 many Souliotes fled to Seltsou Monastery and fought with the Turks. Most were captured and only few managed to escape.

The last years of Ottoman rule the area of the village was a fief of a Turk, named Abram Karakehaya. After the annexation of Arta to Greece in 1881, the residents of Vourgareli bought the fief, paying 4.416 Ottoman liras. A local rich landholder, named Karapanos, helped to gather the money, in exchange for the exploitation of this area for 40 years.

During the Greek Resistance, the headquarters of the Greek guerrilla group EDES was established in Vourgareli. The Germans bombed the village on 5 May 1943.

=== Historical population ===
Census	Settlement	Community
1991	590	
2001	449	792
2011	301	582
2021	296	466

== Places of interest ==
- Red Church (κόκκινη εκκλησία): A Byzantine church, built in 1281.
- Saint George Monastery (Μονή Αγίου Γεωργίου): Old monastery, built at the beginnings of 18th century.
