= Dimitris Tsovolas =

Greek politician (1942–2022)

Dimitris Tsovolas Δημήτριος Τσοβόλας

Minister of Finance
- In office 26 July 1985 – 2 July 1989
- Prime Minister: Andreas Papandreou
- Preceded by: Gerasimos Arsenis
- Succeeded by: Antonis Samaras

Personal details
- Born: 4 September 1942 Melissourgoi, Hellenic State
- Died: 25 February 2022 (aged 79) Athens, Greece
- Party: Panhellenic Socialist Movement (before 1995); Democratic Social Movement (1995–2022)
- Education: University of Thessaloniki

Dimitris Tsovolas (Greek: Δημήτριος Τσοβόλας; 4 September 1942 – 25 February 2022) was a Greek politician who served as Minister of Finance from 1985 to 1989.

== Early life and education ==
Tsovolas was born at Melissourgoi, a village outside Arta, Epirus in 1942. He went on to study law at the Aristotle University of Thessaloniki. He worked as a lawyer in Arta.

== Political career ==
Tsovolas later began his career in politics as a member of PASOK. He was first elected member of the Parliament representing Arta in 1977. He was reelected in 1981 and 1985. He was then elected as an MP for northern Athens.

Tsovolas served in the Ministry of Finance in Andreas Papandreou's government from 1981 to 1989, serving as a deputy minister from 1981 to 1985, and as the full Minister of Finance from 1985 to 1989.

As the Koskotas scandal was unraveling, Andreas Papandreou's blatant patronage reached the point of giving in one of his rallies a public command to Tsovolas, who was Minister of Finance, to "give it all [to them]" (Greek: Τσοβόλα δώσ'τα όλα) and "Tsovolas, empty the coffers [of the state]," and the crowd chanted these back. Papandreou later on said that he was only joking, but this moment characterized the era and made Tsovala's name infamous.

In 1989 he was tried for the so-called Koskotas scandal and was sentenced to 2 years in prison and 3 years lack of his political rights.

In October 1995 he left PASOK and on 20 December that year he founded the Democratic Social Movement.

== Personal life and death ==
Tsovolas was married and had two children. He died on 25 February 2022, at the age of 79.

Political offices
Preceded by Gerasimos Arsenis	Minister of Finance; 1985–1989	Succeeded by Antonis Samaras
