= Athamania, Arta =

Athamania Δήμος Αθαμανίας
- Municipal unit
- Location within the regional unit

- Location within Greece
- Coordinates: 39°22′N 21°11′E
- Country: Greece
- Administrative region: Epirus
- Regional unit: Arta
- Municipality: Central Tzoumerka

Area
  - Municipal unit: 305.0 km^{2} (117.8 sq mi)

Population (2021)
  - Municipal unit: 3,026
  - Municipal unit density: 9.921/km^{2} (25.70/sq mi)
- Time zone: UTC+2 (EET)
  - Summer (DST): UTC+3 (EEST)
- Postal code: 470 45
- Vehicle registration: ΑΤ

Athamania (Greek: Δήμος Αθαμανίας) is a former municipality in the Arta regional unit, Epirus, Greece. Since the 2011 local government reform it is part of the municipality Central Tzoumerka, of which it is a municipal unit. The municipal unit has an area of 304.979 km^{2}. Population: 3,026 (2021). The seat of the municipality was in Vourgareli.

== History ==
It is named after the Athamanians, an ancient Greek tribe that inhabited south-eastern Epirus and west Thessaly.

At the 2011 local government reform, it merged with Agnanta, Melissourgoi, and Theodoriana to form the municipality of Central Tzoumerka.

Alexis Tsipras (former prime minister of Greece) has paternal descent from Athamania through his father, Pavlos, as he was from Athamania in and was a well-off public works contractor.
