= Potentilla montana =

Scientific classification
- Kingdom: Plantae
- Clade: Tracheophytes
- Clade: Angiosperms
- Clade: Eudicots
- Clade: Rosids
- Order: Rosales
- Family: Rosaceae
- Genus: Potentilla
- Species: P. montana

Binomial name
- Potentilla montana Brot.

Species of flowering plant

Potentilla montana is a species of cinquefoil native to France and the northern half of the Iberian Peninsula.
