= Church of St. Mary Peribleptos, Ohrid =

13th-century Macedonian Orthodox Church

Church of St. Mary Peribleptos
- Church of St. Clement
- Света Богородица Перивлепта
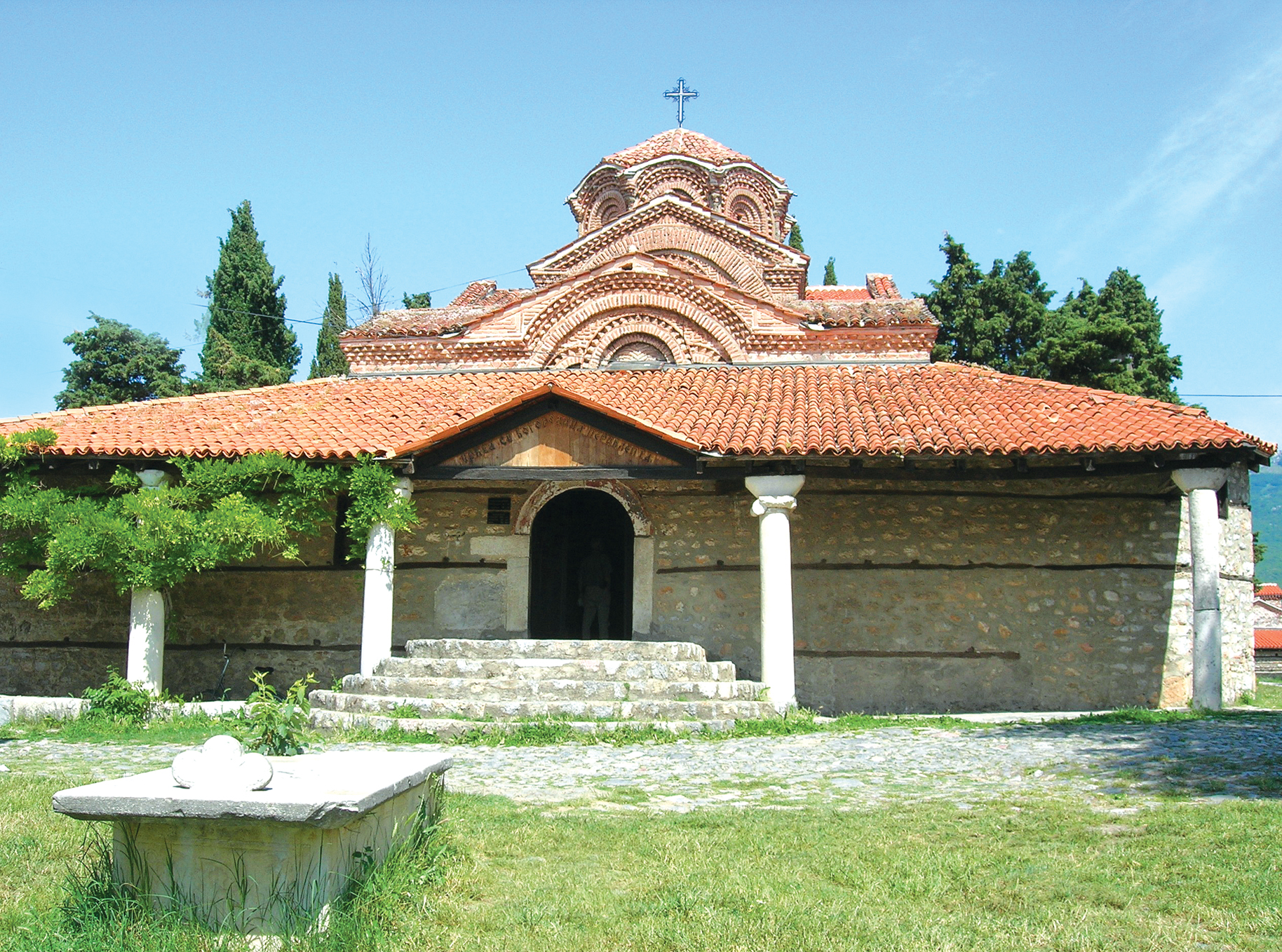

- 41.114167°N 20.795278°E
- Country: North Macedonia
- Tradition: Eastern Orthodoxy

History
- Founded: 1295
- Dedication: St. Mary Peribleptos

Architecture
- Functional status: Active
- Heritage designation: Cultural Monument

Administration
- Archdiocese: Ohrid Archdiocese
- Diocese: Debar-Kičevo diocese

The Church of St. Mary Peribleptos (also referred to as Saint Clement; Macedonian: Света Богородица Перивлепта) is a medieval Orthodox church from the 13th century located in the city of Ohrid, North Macedonia. It is the second cathedral of the Archbishop of Ohrid from the 15th to the 18th centuries AD. It is under the administration of the Debar-Kičevo diocese.

== History ==
An inscription in Greek above the western entrance of the narthex states that the church was erected in 1295 by Byzantine aristocrat, Progonos Sgouros, who was probably of Albanian origin. He was a relative of Emperor Andronikos II Palaiologos. A translation of the inscription states:

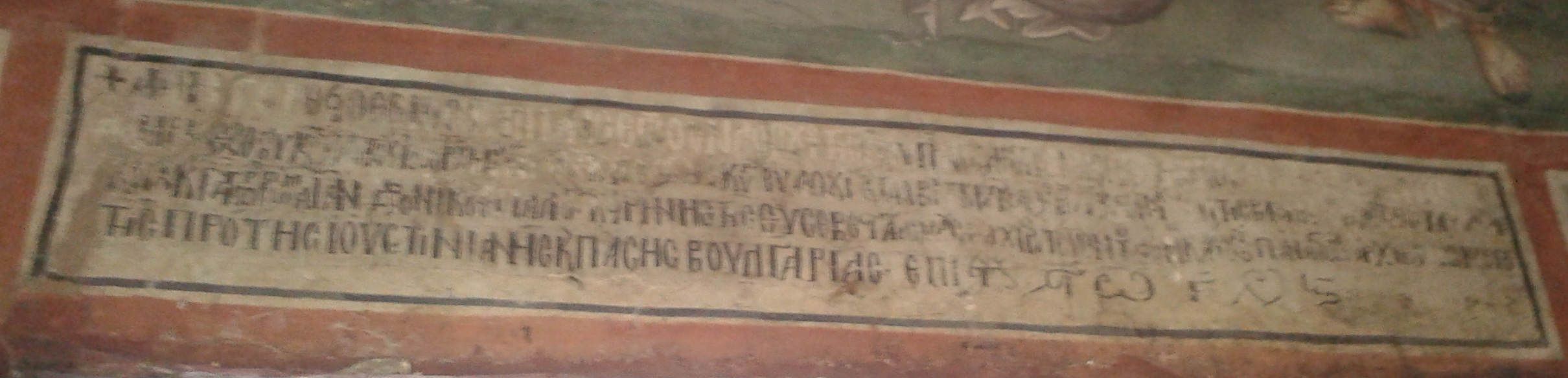

This divine and all-honorable temple of our all-holy Lady Theotokos Peribleptos was erected, with the assistance and expense of Sir Progon Sgur, a great patron, and his wife Madame Eudokia, in-law of our strong and holy autocrat of the Byzantines, Andronikos Palaiologos, and of his most pious wife Irene. Under the bishopric of Macarius, Most Holy Archbishop of the First Justinian and All Bulgaria.

In 1365, two additional chapels were added on the north side of the church. Following the Ottoman conquest of the Balkans and the destruction of the Church of Sts. Clement and Panteleimon, the relics of the saints were moved to St. Mary Peribleptos. After the conversion of the Hagia Sophia from a church into a Mosque, the church became the cathedral for the Archbishopric of Ohrid, and after its closure in 1976, the wider Ohrid area. The church utensils were transferred from St. Sophia and the large patriarch's library, which no longer exist. Next to the church, monasteries and a patriarch's palace were built, which burned down in 1862.

The church is said to have a striking resemblance to Red Church, Vourgareli, leading many to speculate that they were built by the same architects.
