= Red Church (Vourgareli) =

Orthodox church in Vourgareli, Greece

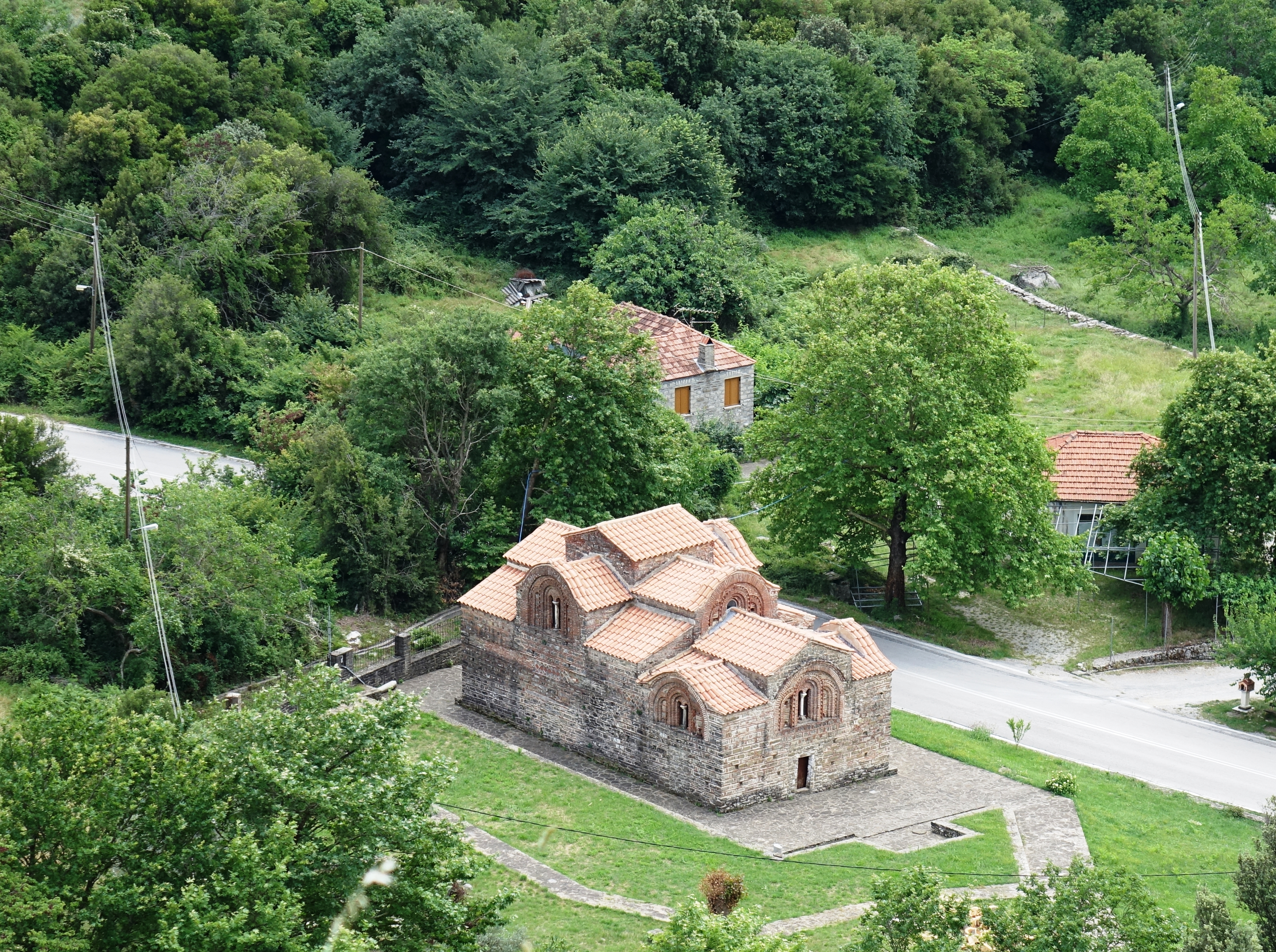

Religion
- Affiliation: Church of Greece
- Ecclesiastical or organisational status: monument
- Year consecrated: c. 1280

Location
- Location: Vourgareli, Greece
- Interactive map of Red Church
- Coordinates: 39°21′17″N 21°11′10″E

Architecture
- Completed: c. 1280

The Red Church (Greek: Κόκκινη Εκκλησιά) is a Byzantine church from c. 1280 in the village of Vourgareli in the Tzoumerka region of Greece.

It was founded as the katholikon of a monastery by the brothers John and Theodore Tzimiskes, who held the rank of protostrator. The church was originally dedicated to the birth of the Theotokos, but became known as the "Red Church" due to the colour of its masonry. Historically, it was also known as "Panagia of Vella" (Παναγία Βελλάς), as it was a metochi of the Vella Monastery, and as "Royal Monastery" (Βασιλομονάστηρο), due to its importance.

Due to their strong similarity, it has been suggested that the church was built by the same workshop that erected the Church of St. Mary Peribleptos (also known as St. Clement) in Ohrid in 1295.
