= Panagia Vlacherna, Arta =

Panagia Vlacherna
- Παναγία της Βλαχέρνας
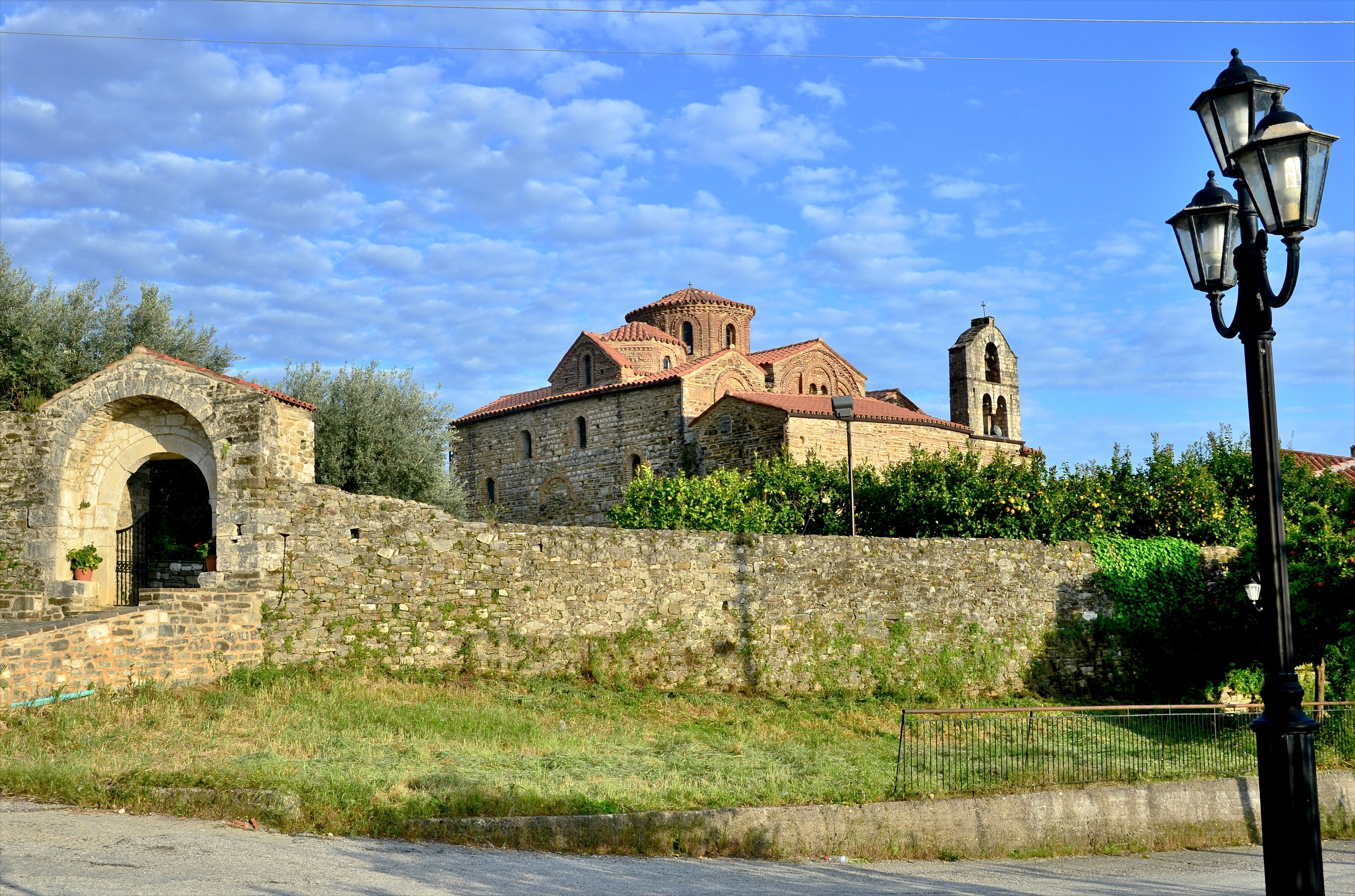

- 39°10′19″N 21°0′0″E
- Location: Vlacherna, Arta
- Country: Greece
- Language: Greek
- Denomination: Greek Orthodox

History
- Status: Open

Architecture
- Completed: 13th century

Administration
- Metropolis: Metropolis of Arta

The Panagia Vlacherna (Greek: Παναγία της Βλαχέρνας) is an imposing Byzantine church of the 10th-13th century, with later interventions, in the village of Vlacherna outside Arta.

Originally built as a monastery catholicon in the type of three-aisled basilica and decorated with frescoes, sculptures, marble inlays and mosaics, Panagia Vlacherna functioned as a burial temple for the Comnenos-Doukas family, rulers of the Despotate of Epirus.

== Overview ==
The original, mid-Byzantine church of the end of the 9th or the beginning of the 10th century. it had the form of a three-aisled, wooden-roofed basilica with a tripartite sanctuary and a semicircular arch protruding from the eastern wall. From that architectural phase, various architectural members built into the later masonry survive, as well as the central arch of the sanctuary and part of an adjacent wall that were incorporated into the chancel of the southeast corner of the later temple. The difference in masonry, shape and height of the arches of the two phases is evident on the east side Archived 2016-03-10 at the Wayback Machine. of the temple.

The church that survives today is late Byzantine (see plan). It was rebuilt in the early 13th century. in the type of three-aisled vaulted basilica. In the middle of the same century, a dome in each aisle and a furnace in the north aisle were added to it, creating a peculiar three-aisled vaulted basilica with three domes.ς At the end of the 13th century, as indicated by the dating of its frescoes, a narthex was added and possibly other additions and chapels, which are not preserved today.

The three aisles are of unequal width and separated by colonnades, while in the sanctuary the transepts are separated by walls with arched openings. The narthex, respectively, is divided by projecting pilasters into three sections. Each nave is covered with a semi-cylindrical arch internally and a pitched tiled roof externally, which are interrupted by the domes, while the narthex has a separate transverse roof.

The roof and dome extend higher in the central aisle than in the other two. Gables are formed on the narrow sides of each roof, in which windows with brick frames are most often opened. Sheltered gables with windows were however added on both long sides in contact with the domes of the side aisles, giving the impression of a cross-roofed temple. Of the five original entrances, one on each long side and three on the west wall in correspondence with the aisles, only the central one of the west wall remains open today.

== Sources ==
- A. Oρλάνδος, "Η παρά την Άρταν μονή των Βλαχερνών", Αρχείον των Βυζαντινών Μνημείων της Ελλάδος 2, 1936, σσ. 3–4.
- Α. Oρλάνδος, "Προσθήκη εις τα περί της Μονής των Βλαχερνών", Αρχείον των Βυζαντινών Μνημείων της Ελλάδος 2, 1936, σ. 180.
- Π. Βοκοτόπουλος, "Η τέχνη στην εποχή του Δεσποτάτου", στο: Μ.Β. Σακελλαρίου (επιμ.), Ήπειρος, 4000 χρόνια ελληνικής ιστορίας και πολιτισμού, Αθήνα 1997, σσ. 224–237.
- Β.Ν. Παπαδοπούλου, Η βυζαντινή Άρτα και τα μνημεία της, Αθήνα 2002.
- Ν.Χ. Καπώνης, Η ναοδομική αρχιτεκτονική του Δεσποτάτου της Ηπείρου την περίοδο της Δυναστείας των Κομνηνών Αγγέλων (1204-1318), Διδακτορική διατριβή, Πανεπιστήμιο Ιωαννίνων, Αγρίνιο 2005.
- Μ. Αχειμάστου-Ποταμιάνου, Η Βλαχέρνα της Άρτας: Τοιχογραφίες, Βιβλιοθήκη της εν Αθήναις Αρχαιολογικής Εταιρείας 264, Αθήνα 2009.
- Δ. Γιαννούλης, Οι τοιχογραφίες των Βυζαντινών μνημείων της Άρτας κατά την περίοδο του Δεσποτάτου της Ηπείρου, Ιωάννινα 2010.
