= Central Tzoumerka =

Central Tzoumerka Κεντρικά Τζουμέρκα
- Municipality
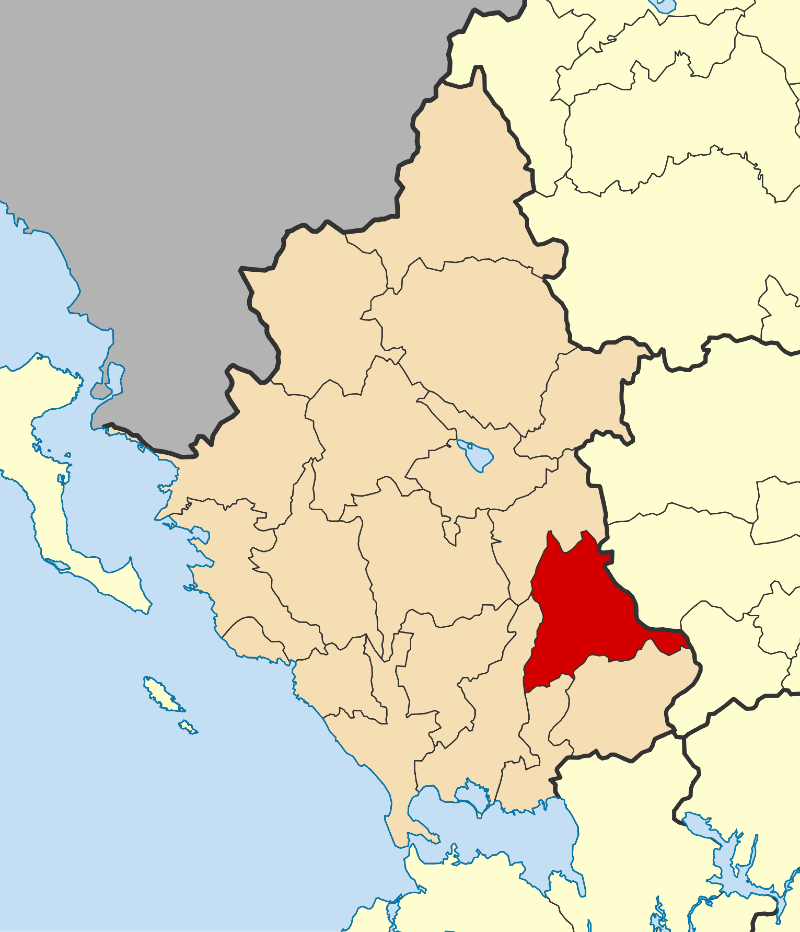

- Location within Greece
- Coordinates: 39°22′N 21°11′E
- Country: Greece
- Administrative region: Epirus
- Regional unit: Arta
- Seat: Vourgareli

Area
  - Municipality: 509.2 km^{2} (196.6 sq mi)

Population (2021)
  - Municipality: 5,498
  - Density: 10.80/km^{2} (27.96/sq mi)
- Time zone: UTC+2 (EET)
  - Summer (DST): UTC+3 (EEST)
- Vehicle registration: AT

Central Tzoumerka (Greek: Κεντρικά Τζουμέρκα) is a municipality in the Arta regional unit, Epirus, Greece. The seat of the municipality is the village Vourgareli. The municipality has an area of 509.231 km^{2}. The municipality is named after the Tzoumerka mountains.

== Municipality ==
The municipality Central Tzoumerka was formed at the 2011 local government reform by the merger of the following 4 former municipalities, that became municipal units:

- Agnanta
- Athamania
- Melissourgoi
- Theodoriana
