= Athamania, Trikala =

Athamania Αθαμανία
- Community
- Location within Greece
- Coordinates: 39°31.6′N 21°15′E
- Country: Greece
- Administrative region: Thessaly
- Regional unit: Trikala
- Municipality: Pyli
- Municipal unit: Aithikes

Area
  - Community: 27.802 km^{2} (10.734 sq mi)
- Elevation: 940 m (3,080 ft)

Population (2021)
  - Community: 27
  - Density: 0.97/km^{2} (2.5/sq mi)
- Time zone: UTC+2 (EET)
  - Summer (DST): UTC+3 (EEST)
- Postal code: 420 37
- Area code: +30-2434
- Vehicle registration: TK

Athamania (Greek: Αθαμανία, Aromanian: Muchara) is an Aromanian (Vlach) village and a community of the Pyli municipality. Before the 2011 local government reform it was part of the municipality Aithikes, of which it was a municipal district. The 2021 census recorded 27 residents in the village. The community of Athamania covers an area of 27.802 km^{2}.

== Geography ==
Athamania lies on the border between Thessaly and Epirus. It is located below mountain Kakarditsa (2,450m), which is the highest top of the Tzoumerka mountain range.

== Sightseeings and festivals ==
Athamania has some remarkable and very important monuments like the churches of Saint Paraskevi, the Saviour, Saint Athanasios, Prophet Elias, the Saint Apostles and Saint John the Forerunner. Many festivals of various types take place in Athamania. The traditional festival of Saint Paraskevi is the most significant summer celebration.

== See also ==
- List of settlements in the Trikala regional unit
