= Therma, Samothrace =

Therma Θέρμα
- Settlement
- Location within Greece
- Coordinates: 40°29′49″N 25°36′31″E
- Country: Greece
- Regional unit: Evros
- Municipality: Samothrace

Population (2021)
  - Total: 83
- Time zone: UTC+2 (EET)
  - Summer (DST): UTC+3 (EEST)

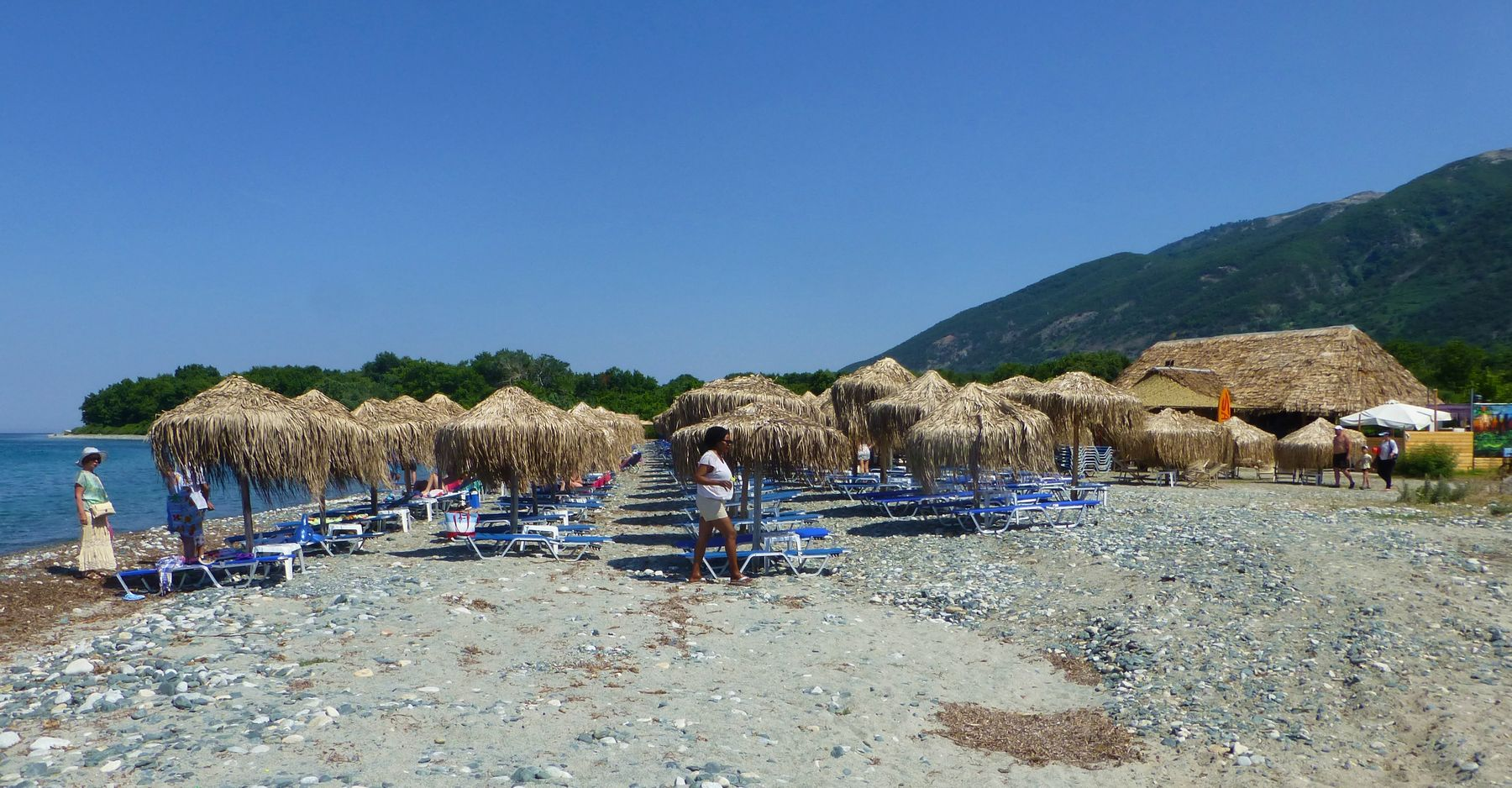
Thermia Beach, Samothraki, Samothrace, Greece.

Therma (Greek: Θέρμα), also known as Loutra (Λουτρά), is a village located on the northern side of the Greek island of Samothrace, in the northern Aegean Sea. As of 2021, Therma had a permanent population of 83.

== Tourism ==
Therma is a popular tourist destination. It is known for its hot springs, from which it derives its names. There are also many nearby canyons that are popular with tourists. The summit of Fengari can be reached via a hiking trail from Therma.
