= Samothrace =

Greek island in the Aegean Sea

Samothrace Σαμοθράκη
- Municipality
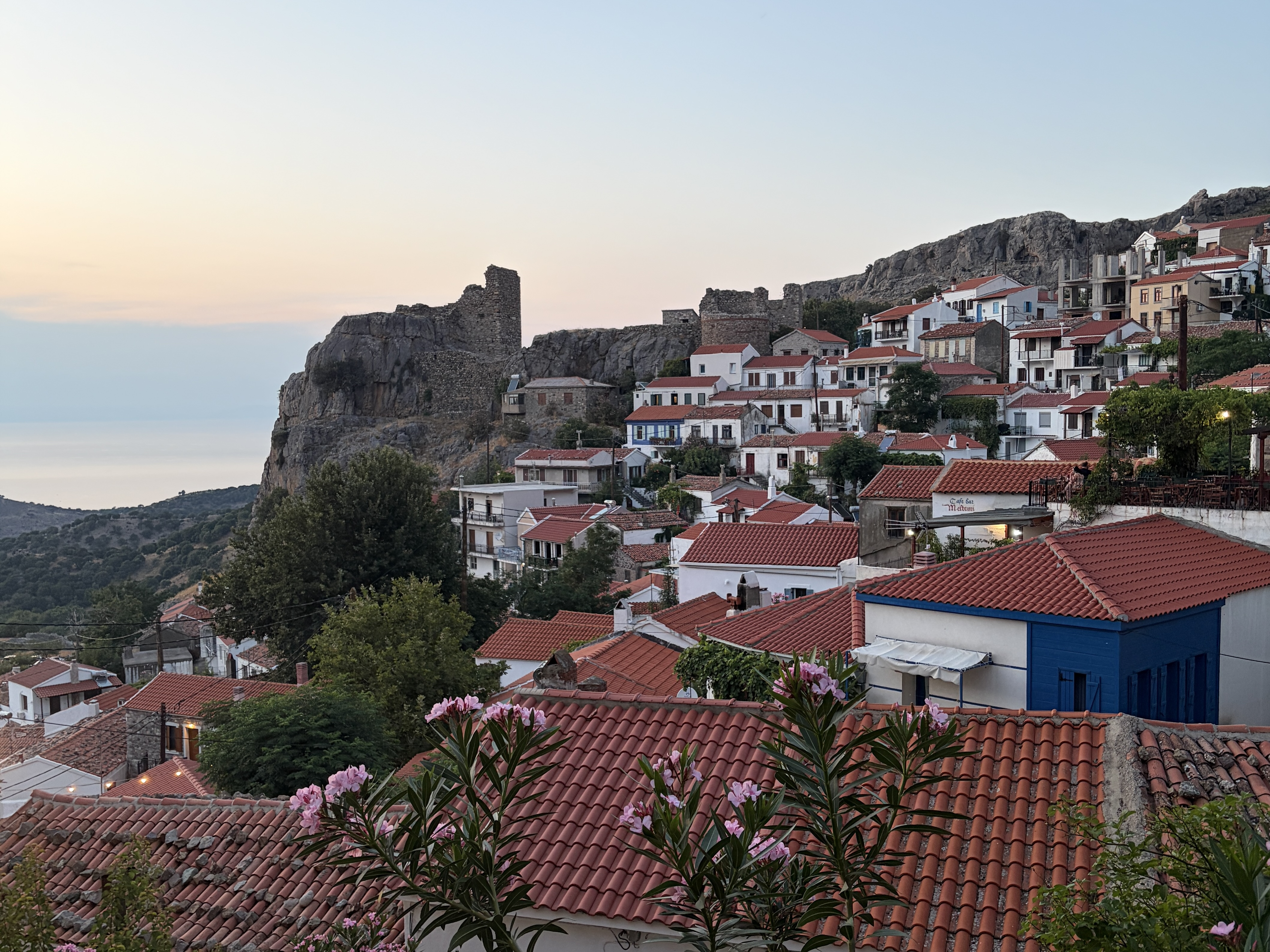
- Chora, Samothraki

- Location within Greece
- Coordinates: 40°27′00″N 25°35′15″E
- Country: Greece
- Administrative region: Eastern Macedonia and Thrace
- Regional unit: Evros

Government
  - Mayor: Athanasios Vitsas (since 2014)

Area
  - Municipality: 178.0 km^{2} (68.7 sq mi)
- Highest elevation: 1,611 m (5,285 ft)
- Lowest elevation: 0 m (0 ft)

Population (2021)
  - Municipality: 2,596
  - Density: 14.58/km^{2} (37.77/sq mi)
- Demonym: Samothracian
- Time zone: UTC+2 (EET)
  - Summer (DST): UTC+3 (EEST)
- Postal code: 680 02
- Area code: 25510
- Vehicle registration: ΕΒ
- Website: www.samothraki.gr

Samothrace (Greek: Σαμοθράκη, romanized: Samothráki, pronounced [s̠amoˈθɾaci]) is a Greek island in the northern Aegean Sea. It is a municipality within the Evros regional unit of Thrace. The island is 17 km (11 mi) long, 178 km^{2} (69 sq mi) in size and has a population of 2,596 (2021 census). Its main industries are fishing and tourism. Resources on the island include granite and basalt. Samothrace is one of the most rugged Greek islands, with Mt Saos and its highest peak, Fengari, rising to 1,611 m (5,285 ft). The Winged Victory of Samothrace statue, which is now displayed at the Louvre in Paris, was found on the island.

== History ==
=== Antiquity ===
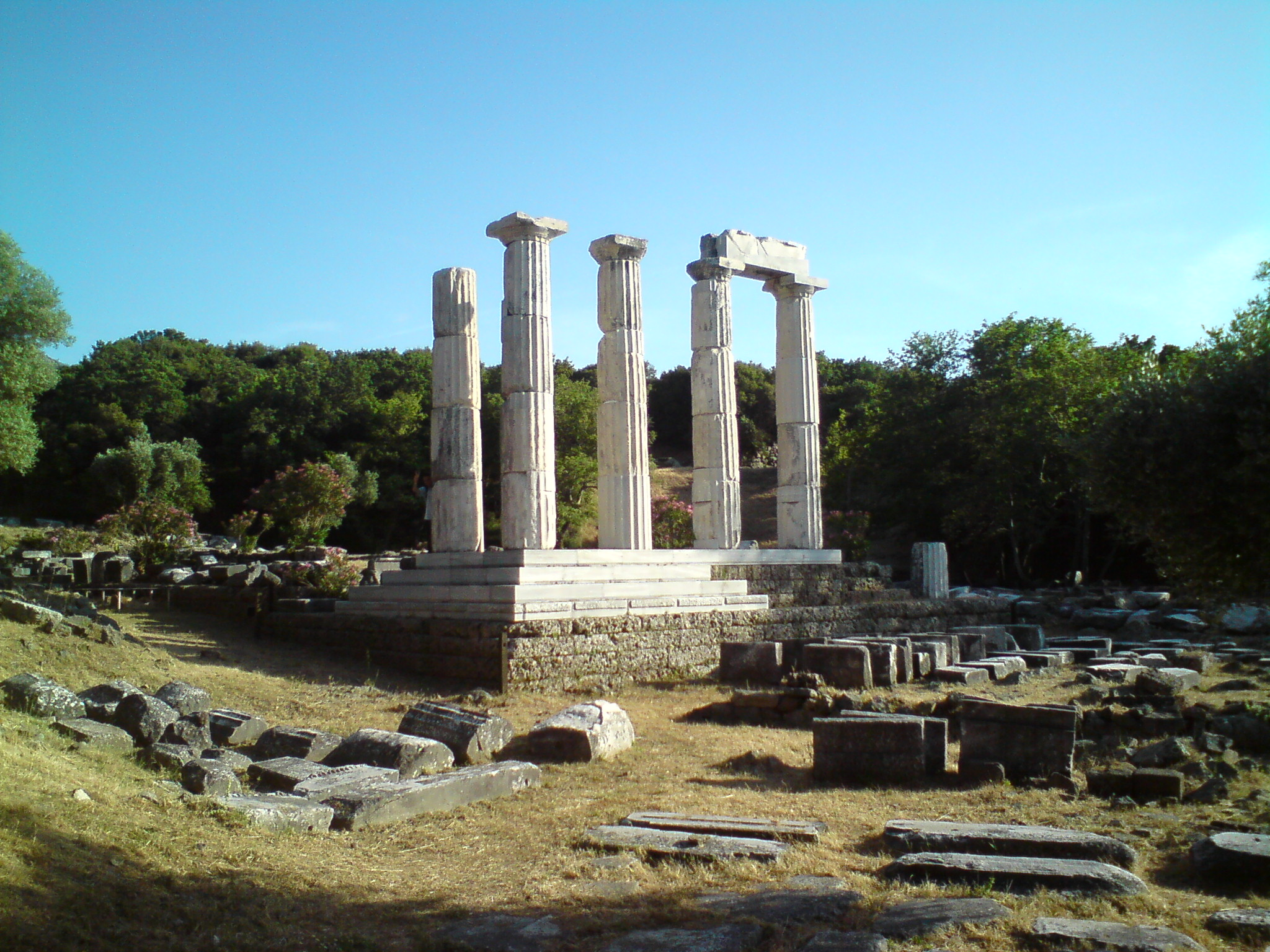
Sanctuary of the Great Gods, Paleopolis

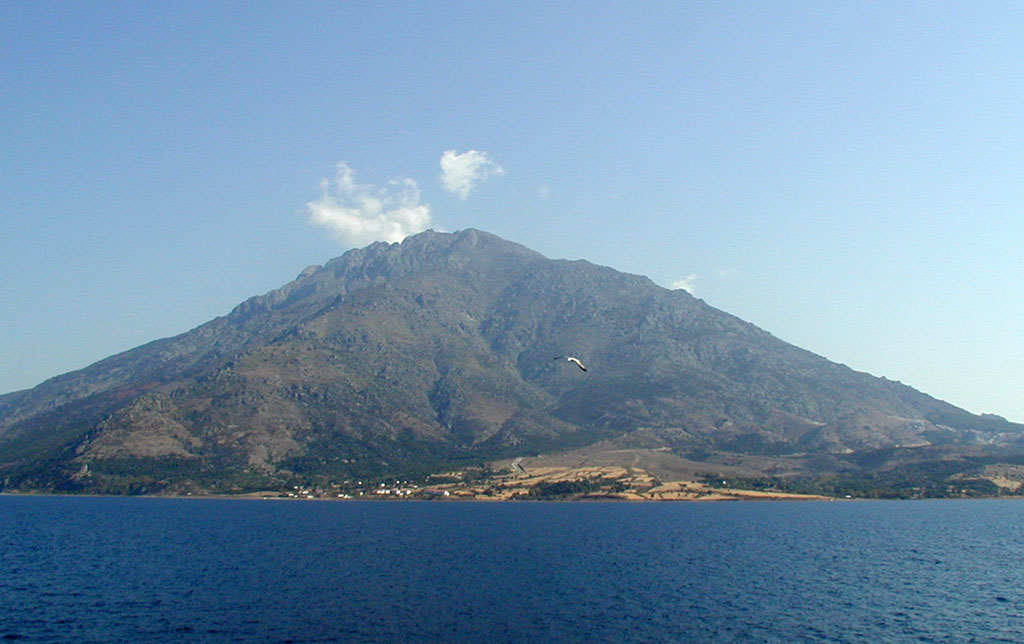
Samothrace, with Mount Fengari in the background

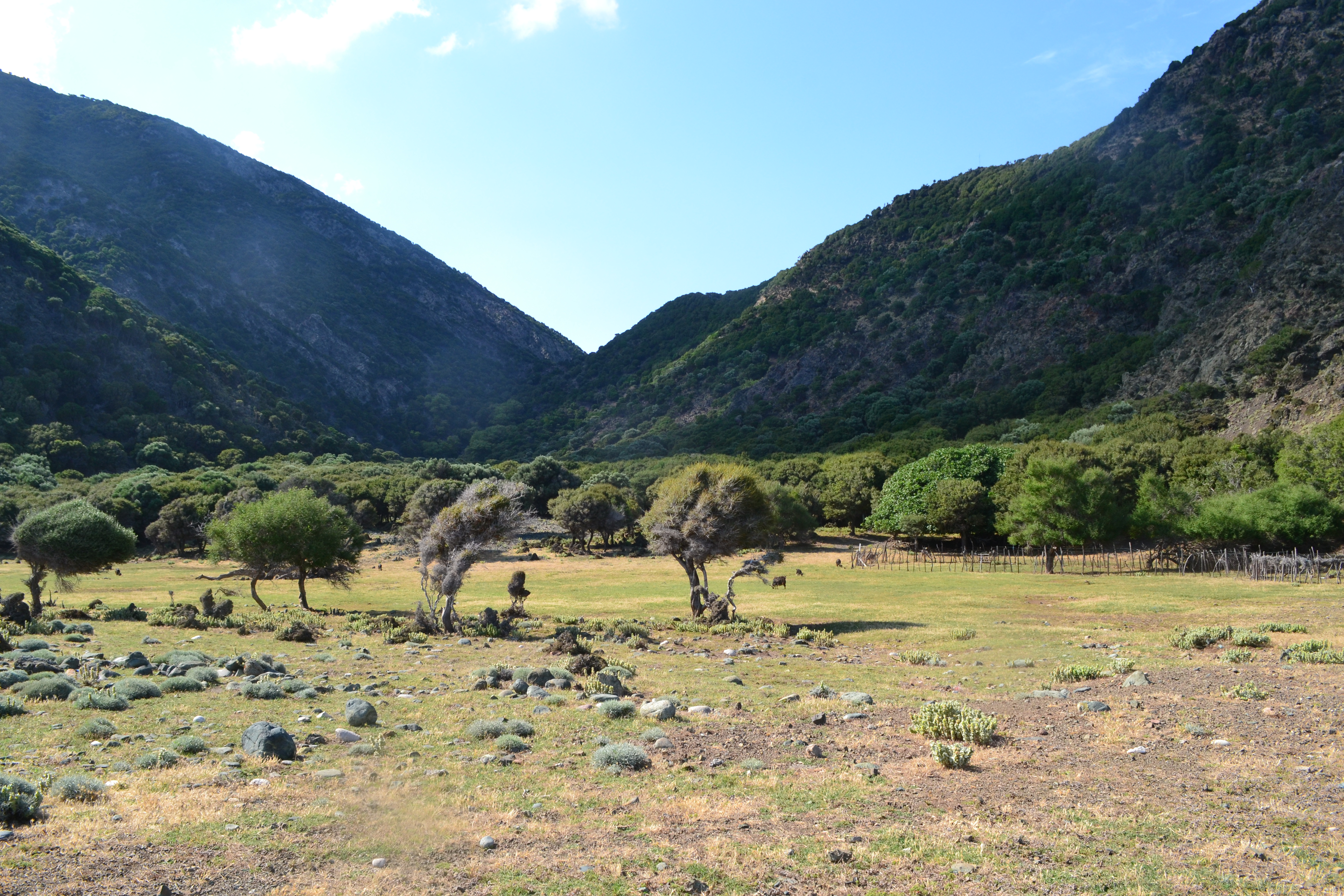
Landscape

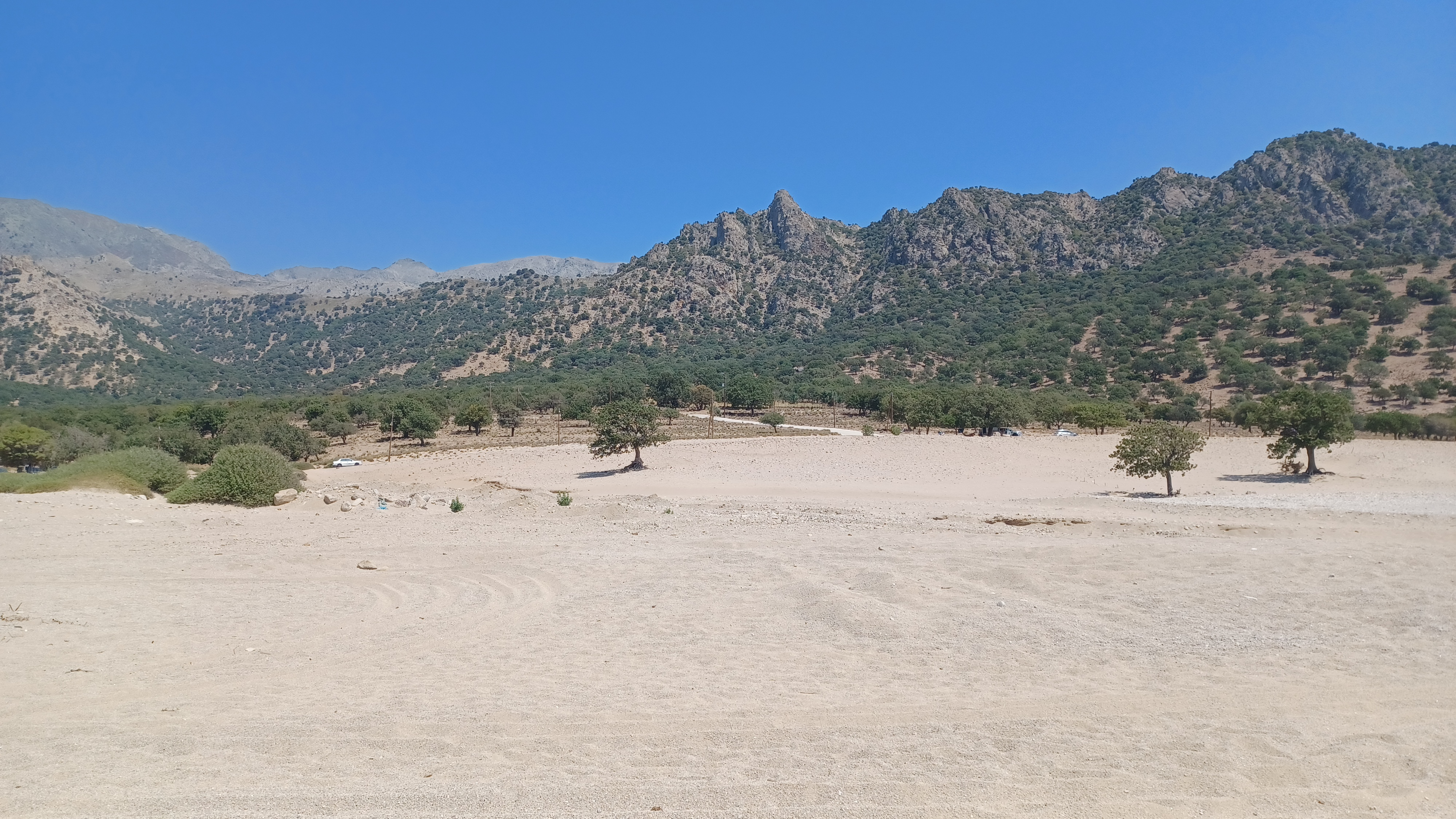
Pachia Ammos beach

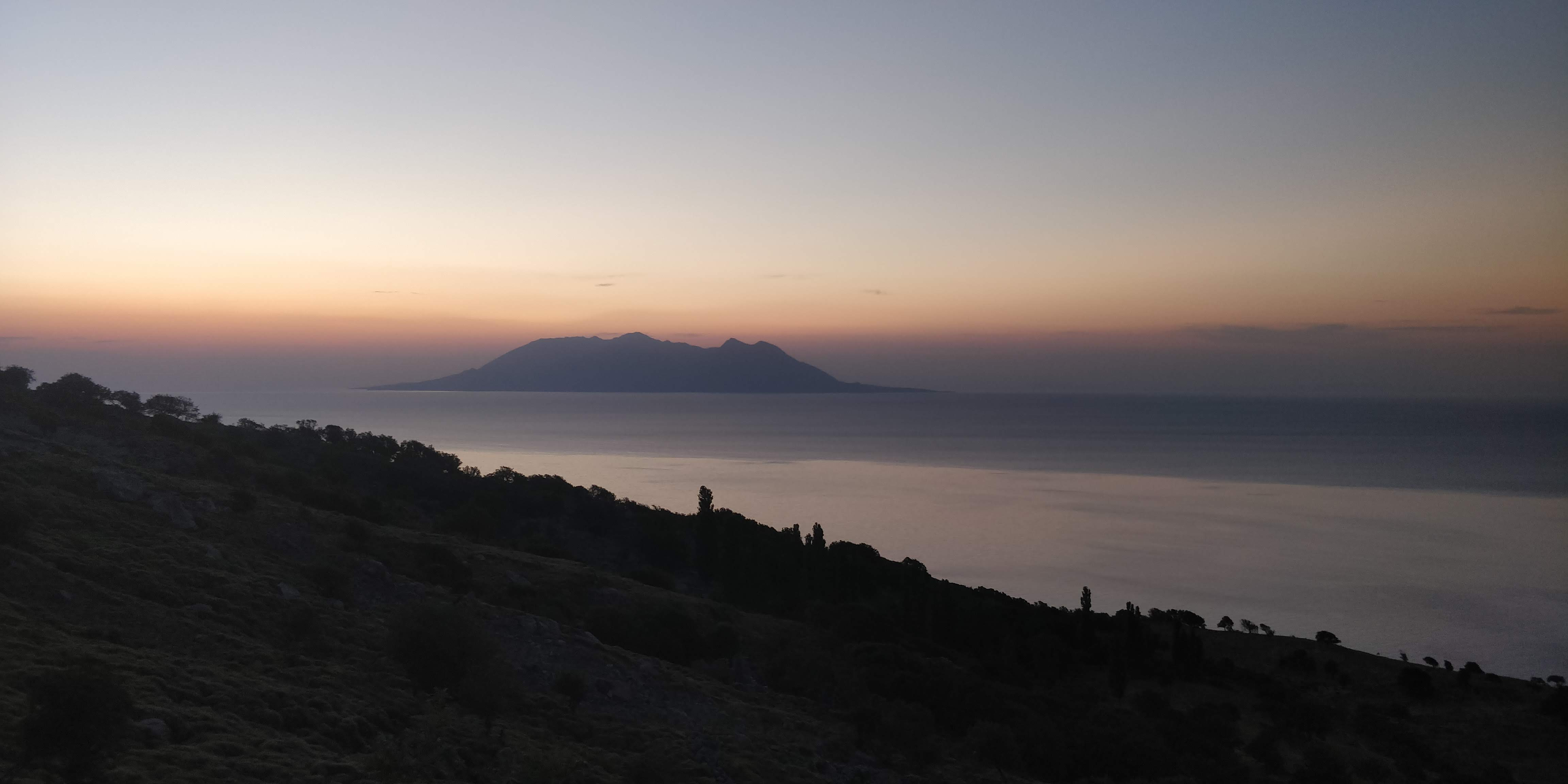
View of Samothrace from Imbros at sunset

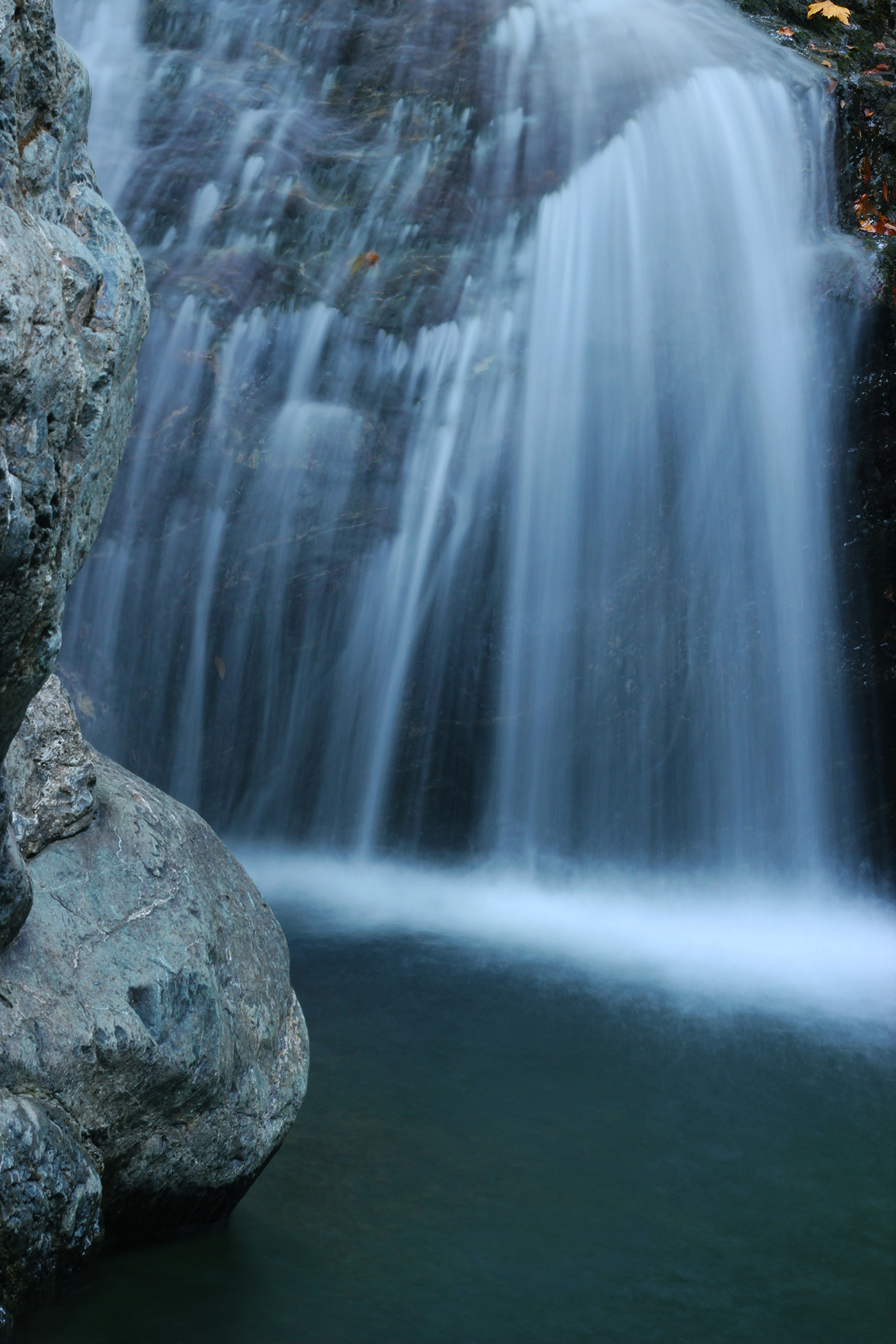
Waterfall and pond, characteristics of the island

Samothrace never became a state of any political significance in ancient Greece, since it lacks natural harbours and most of the island is too mountainous for cultivation: Mount Fengari (literally 'Mt Moon') rises to 1,611 m (5,285 ft). It was the home of the Sanctuary of the Great Gods, site of important Hellenic and pre-Hellenic religious ceremonies. Those who visited this shrine to be initiated into the island cult included Lysander of Sparta, Philip II of Macedon and Lucius Calpurnius Piso Caesoninus, father-in-law of Julius Caesar.

The ancient city, the ruins of which are called Palaeopolis ('old city'), stood on the north coast. Considerable remains exist of the ancient walls, which were built in massive Cyclopean style, as well as of the Sanctuary of the Great Gods, where mysterious rites (Samothracian Mysteries), which were open to both slaves and free people (similar to the Eleusinian Mysteries), took place. Demetrios of Skepsis mentions the Samothracian Mysteries, as does Aristophanes in his Peace.

The traditional account from antiquity is that Samothrace was first inhabited by Pelasgians and Carians, and later by Thracians. At the end of the 8th century BC Greeks from Samos colonised the island and named it "Samos of Thrace", that later became Samothrace; however, Strabo denies this. The archaeological evidence suggests that Greek settlement took place in the 6th century BC.

Samothrace came under Persian occupation in 508 BC, followed by a period of Athenian control, and eventually became a member of the Delian League in the 5th century BC. It was subjugated by Philip II and from then till 168 BC it was under Macedonian suzerainty. After the 168 BC battle of Pydna, Samothrace became independent, a condition that ended when Vespasian absorbed the island in the Roman Empire in AD 70.

During the Roman and particularly the imperial period, thanks to the interest of the Roman emperors, the influence of the sanctuary of the Great Gods extended beyond Greek borders and Samothrace became an international religious center, where pilgrims flocked from all over the Roman world. Apart from the famous sanctuary, also playing a decisive role in the great development of Samothrace were her two ports, situated on the sea road from Troas to Macedonia. Furthermore an important role was played by her possessions in Perea, which were conceded by the Romans at least during the imperial period, as evidenced by inscriptions of the 1st AD century. The island is mentioned in the King James Version of the Bible with the name Samothracia.

=== Middle Ages to Modern era ===
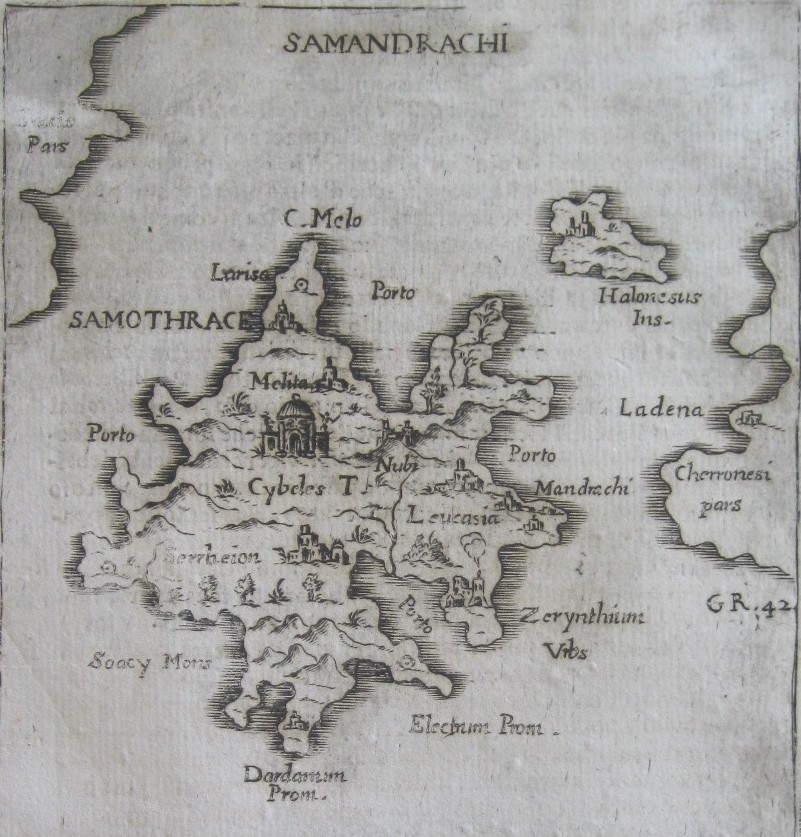
Samothrachi by Francesco Piacenza, 1688

St. Theophanes died in Samothrace in 818. The Byzantines ruled until 1204, when Venetians took their place, only to be dislodged in 1355 by a Genoese family, the Gattilusi. The Ottoman Empire conquered it in 1457 and it was called Semadirek in Turkish. In the era of Kanuni Sultan Süleyman the island became a vakıf for the Süleymaniye Mosque and its Imaret in İstanbul. During the Ottoman period, it was one of the islands open to settlement among the Boğazönü Islands. The appearance of a person from Samothrace among the new inhabitants of the island of Lemnos in 1490 indicates that the population movements on the island were mostly with the surrounding islands and therefore the coastal areas close to Anatolia. The total tax population of the island in 1519 was 182 soldiers (male population of fighting age). 53 of them were newcomers to the island. There was a total tax population of 220 soldiers here in 1530 (twelve of whom were foreigners). In 1569, there were four settlements and a tax population of 742 soldiers on the island. Seven soldiers of this population were Muslims. The fact that neighborhoods, which are the main features of Ottoman towns and cities, were established in this last date indicates the process of becoming a town. However, in the mid-17th century, Bernard Randolph, while describing the island with Thasos and Imbros, states that all three of the islands were neglected because they were flooded by pirates and there were only two or three villages on each of them.

Flag of Greek rebels in Thrace and Samothrace during the Greek War of Independence

According to Charles Vellay a rebellion against the Ottoman rule and Muslim population by the local population during the Greek War of Independence (1821–1831) led to the massacre of 1,000 inhabitants. The island came under Greek rule in 1913 following the Balkan Wars. It was occupied temporarily by Bulgaria during the Second World War, from 1941 to 1944.

=== Today ===
The modern port town of Kamariotissa is on the north-west coast and provides ferry access to and from points in northern Greece such as Alexandroupoli and Myrina. There is no commercial airport on the island. Other sites of interest on the island include the ruins of Genoese forts, the picturesque Chora (literally village) and Paleapolis (literally Old Town), and several waterfalls.

A 2019 article estimated that the current population of goats on the island outnumbers humans by about 15 to 1, resulting in unwanted erosion as a result of overgrazing.

== Landmarks ==
The island's most famous site is the Sanctuary of the Great Gods (Greek: Hieron ton Megalon Theon). The most famous artifact from the temple complex is the 2.5-metre marble statue of Nike (now known as the Winged Victory of Samothrace), which dates from about 190 BC. It was discovered in pieces on the island in 1863 by the French archaeologist Charles Champoiseau. It is now headless and is displayed at the Louvre in Paris. The Winged Victory is featured on the island's municipal seal.

The Archaeological Museum of Samothrace is located in the area of the Sanctuary of the Great Gods with a collection of ancient artefacts from the Sanctuary and all over the island.

== Communities ==
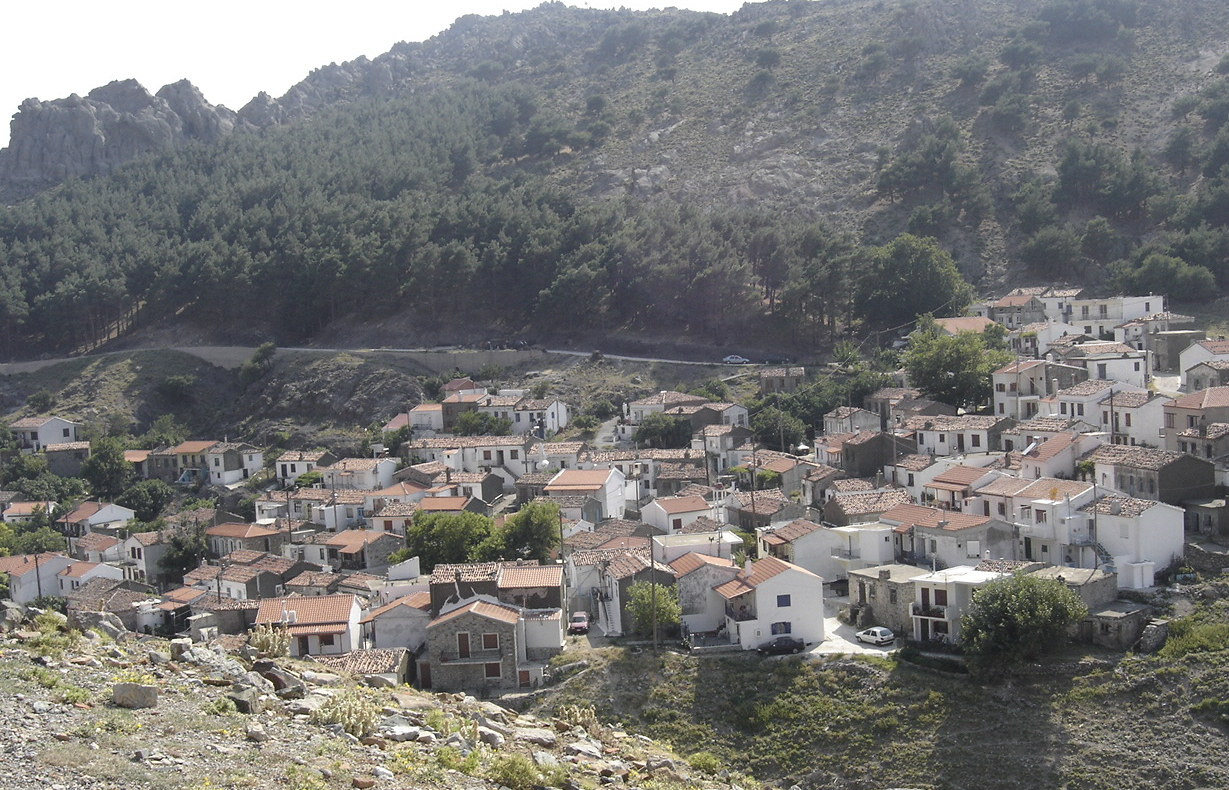
View of Samothraki town

- Alonia (pop. 291 in 2011)
- Ano Karyotes (22)
- Ano Meria (57)
- Dafnes (16)
- Kamariotissa (1,069)
- Kato Karyotes (41)
- Katsampas (15)
- Lakkoma (317)
- Makrylies (12)
- Palaiopoli (36)
- Potamia (6)
- Profitis Ilias (189)
- Samothrace/Samothraki (Chora) (653)
- Therma (106)
- Xiropotamos (29)

== Province ==
The province of Samothrace (Greek: Επαρχία Σαμοθράκης) was one of the provinces of the Evros Prefecture. It had the same territory as the present municipality. It was abolished in 2006.

== Climate ==
Samothraki has a hot-summer Mediterranean climate. Winters are cool and rainy with occasional heavy snowstorms, especially at higher elevations.

Climate data for Kamariotissa village (90m)
Month	Jan	Feb	Mar	Apr	May	Jun	Jul	Aug	Sep	Oct	Nov	Dec	Year
Mean daily maximum °C (°F)	11.5 (52.7)	12.7 (54.9)	14.5 (58.1)	17.2 (63.0)	23.7 (74.7)	28.7 (83.7)	31.9 (89.4)	32.3 (90.1)	27.6 (81.7)	22.2 (72.0)	17.8 (64.0)	13.9 (57.0)	21.2 (70.1)
Mean daily minimum °C (°F)	6.8 (44.2)	7.1 (44.8)	8.6 (47.5)	10.5 (50.9)	15.8 (60.4)	20.5 (68.9)	23.4 (74.1)	23.9 (75.0)	20.4 (68.7)	15.8 (60.4)	12.7 (54.9)	9.4 (48.9)	14.6 (58.2)
Average precipitation mm (inches)	110.1 (4.33)	55.1 (2.17)	73.7 (2.90)	34.7 (1.37)	29.7 (1.17)	15.9 (0.63)	12.2 (0.48)	9 (0.4)	8.4 (0.33)	74.3 (2.93)	108.3 (4.26)	101.7 (4.00)	633.1 (24.97)
Source: http://penteli.meteo.gr/stations/samothraki/ (2019–2021 averages)

== Historical population ==
Year	Island population
1981	2,871
1991	3,083
2001	2,723
2011	2,859
2021	2,596

== People ==
- Aristarchus of Samothrace (c. 220 – c. 143 BC), ancient Greek grammarian and Homeric scholar
- Theophanes the Confessor (c. 758 – c. 818)
- Nikolaos Fardys (1853–1901), Greek scholar

== See also ==
- List of settlements in the Evros regional unit
- Battle of Samothrace (1698)
