= Kato Panagia Monastery =

- Μονή Κάτω Παναγιάς
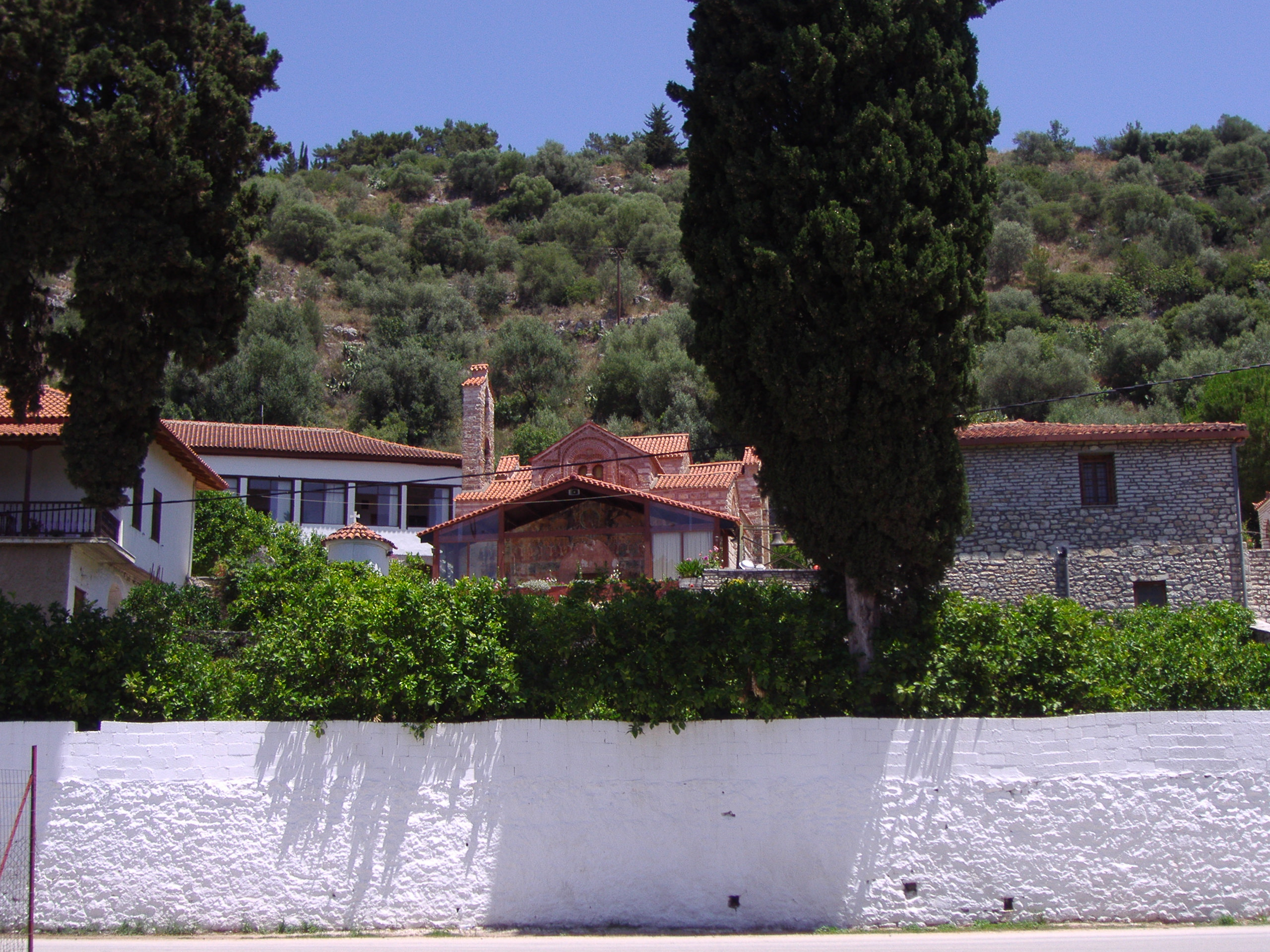
- Interactive map of Kato Panagia Monastery

Monastery information
- Other name: Nativity of the Theotokos Monastery
- Established: 1250
- Dedication: Nativity of the Theotokos
- Celebration: September 8
- Diocese: Metropolis of Arta

Site
- Location: Peranthi hill, Arta
- Country: Greece
- Coordinates: 39°8′41″N 20°59′23″E

The Kato Panagia Monastery (Greek: Μονή Κάτω Παναγιάς) is a monastery at the foot of Peranthi hill, about 20 minutes west of Arta, next to the river Arachthos.

== History ==
It was founded in 1250 by the despot of Epirus Michael II Doukas and his wife, later Saint Theodora (holiday 11 March). Its foundation coincides with the period when the Despotate of Epirus was flourishing.

Kato Panagia was named to distinguish it from Parigoritissa, which is built on a higher level than the monastery. It is one of three monasteries that Michael built as a sign of his repentance. Biographer of Saint Theodora Job Monk (17th century) reported the marital infidelity into which Michael fell with an Artine noblewoman, Gangrini, from whom he had two illegitimate sons. The other two monasteries are Panagia toni Vlacherna, in the homonymous village of Vlacherna, and of Agios Georgios, where the current church of Saint Theodora is located in Arta. Theodora lived as a nun for the last 10 years of her life until her death in 1280, when the monastery was renamed for Saint Theodora.

== Ledger ==
From the original building complex, only the Catholic church, with its cross-roofed architecture, ornate ceramic decoration and built-in marble volumes taken from the ruins of the neighboring Amvrakia, is preserved. On the western exterior is a clearly visible monogram of Michael Doukas, despot of Epirus from 1237 - 1270. The church is frescoed in various periods. The most ancient one is that of the deacon which is considered to be contemporary with its construction, i.e. the middle of the 13th century. The cells and other auxiliary buildings came later.

== Modern history ==
Until 1953, the monastery was a men's monastery. It was converted to a women's monastery when the Archbishop of Athens Seraphim (Tikas) was Metropolitan of Arta. The Monastery's first Abbess was the blessed nun of continental origin (Metsovo) Gerontissa Agni Papadimitriou, thanks to whom the Monastery found renewed life and acquired its ultimate form. The monastery functions as a women's monastery, supported by the monks' weaving. The temple of Saint Neomartyr Zacharias of Arta was built by Gerontissa Agni in an area outside the monastery enclosure. This church holds the original icon of the Saint.
