= Archaeological Museum of Arta =

Coordinates: 39°09′00″N 20°58′42″E

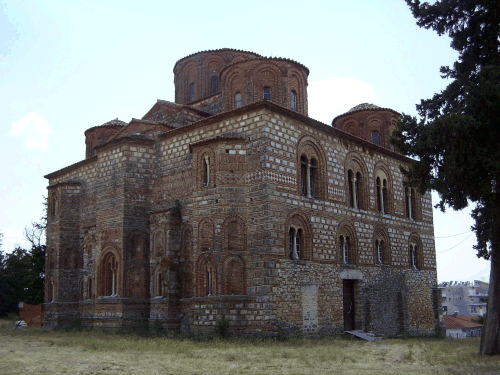
- The collection used to be housed in the 13th-century Paregoretissa church.
- Established: 1973
- Location: Arta, Arta regional unit, Epirus, Greece
- Type: Archaeological museum

The Archaeological Museum of Arta is a museum in Arta, Greece. It was established in 1973 as the Archaeological collection of Arta, and used to be housed in the 13th-century Paregoretissa church. The collection has now been moved to a brand new, purpose-built museum building which opened in 2009. The new museum building is located by the river, close to the historical bridge.

== Exhibits ==
The exhibition includes three main sections: the public life, the cemeteries, and the private life of Ambraciotes, whilst at the start and end of the exhibition there are individual smaller sections covering the birth and fall of Ambracia, respectively.

The bulk of the collection from the city of Arta come from excavations of the two cemeteries housed outside the walls of the ancient city of Ambracia (east and southwest), from public buildings such as the small and large Greek Theatre, the Temple of Apollo and the Prytaneion, houses and other building residues, as well as ceramic and other laboratories, discovered by archaeological research.

The museum's exhibition spans a wide time period, from the Paleolithic up to the Roman period. The majority of exhibits belongs to the Hellenistic era, an era that coincides with the highest economic and civil growth in the heyday of Ambracia, at which time the city was the capital of Epirus.
