= Church of the Parigoritissa =

13th-century church in Arta, Greece

Coordinates: 39.1589°N 20.9835°E

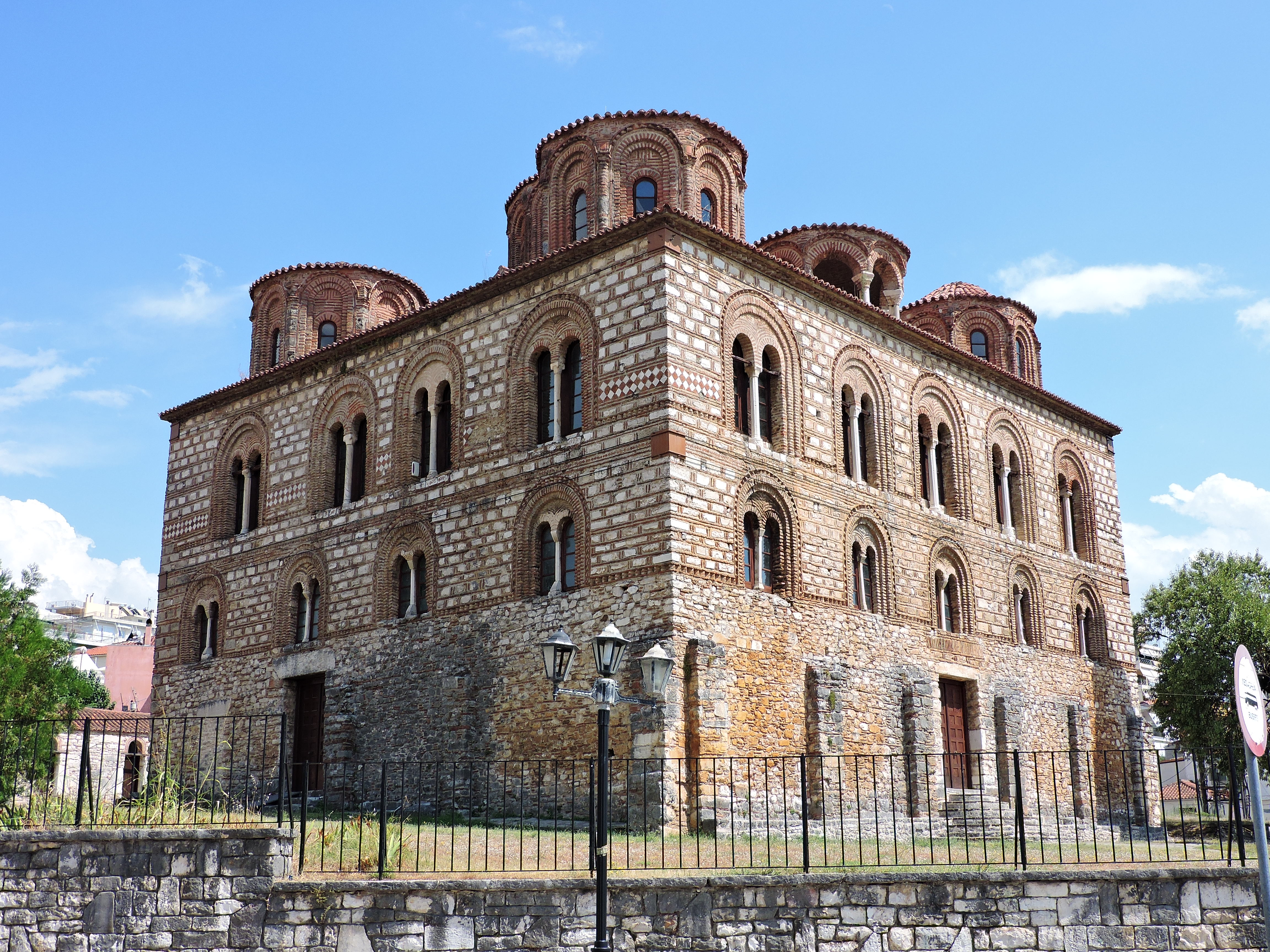
The Church of the Parigoritissa

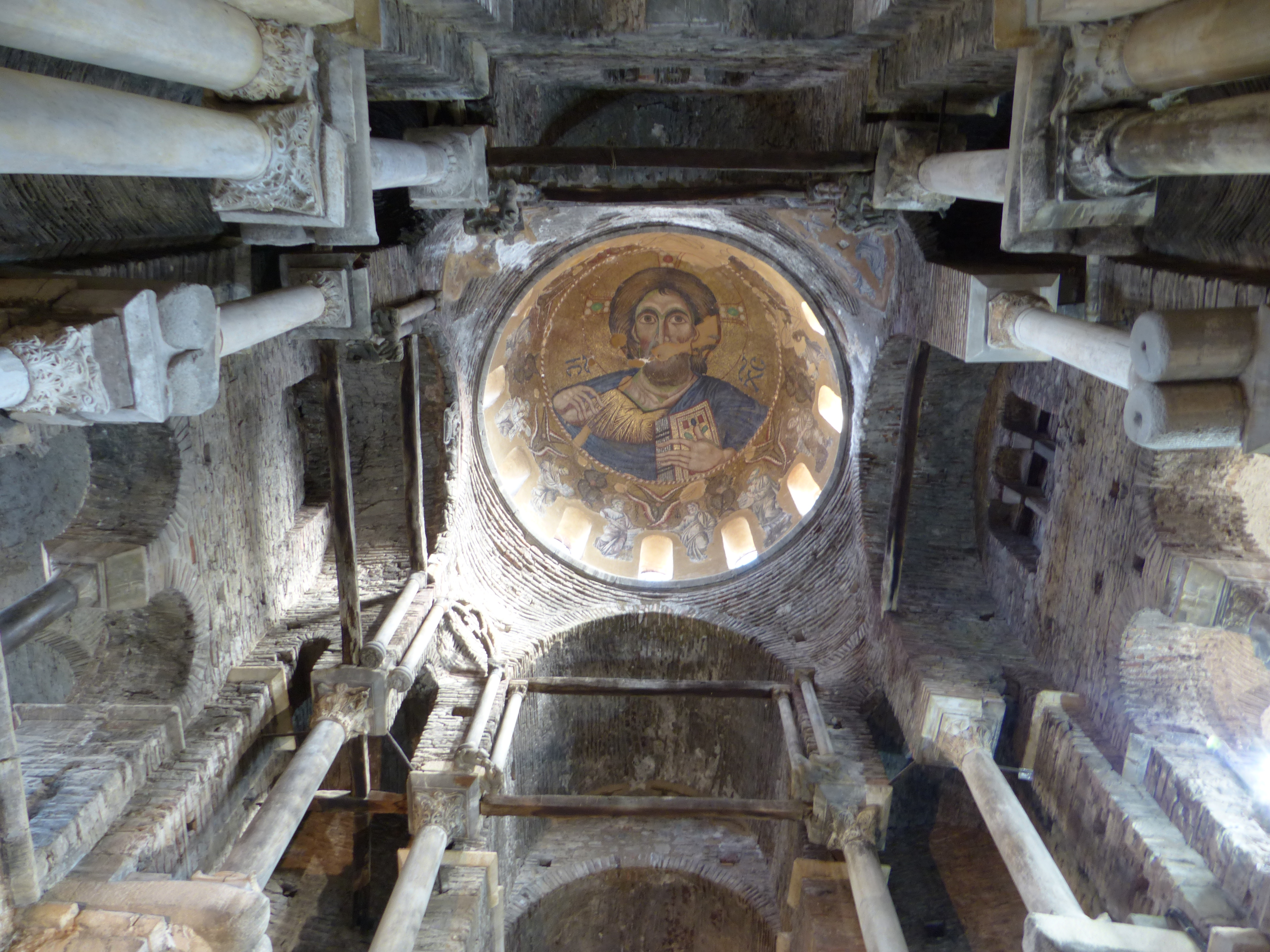
Interior

The Church of the Parigoritissa or Paregoretissa (Greek: Παναγία ἠ Παρηγορήτισσα, lit. 'Panagia of Consolation') is the 13th-century Byzantine metropolitan church of the Greek city of Arta. Part of the building used to house the Archaeological Collection of Arta.

== Description ==
The church was founded around 1250 by the Despot of Epirus Michael II Komnenos Doukas, or perhaps someone in his court. At some point, the church was damaged, and it was then restored in 1290 by Michael II's son and successor, Nikephoros I Komnenos Doukas (r. 1268–1297) and his second wife Anna Kantakouzene. The church eventually became bankrupt, and was turned into a dependency (metochion) of the Monastery of Kato Panagia. In 1578, it is attested as a female convent.

The church is a large, almost square three-storey building. It is of the octagonal type, with the central dome supported by eight piers divided into three tiers. There are also four smaller domes on each corner of the church's flat roof, and a lantern. Its interior decoration is rich, with marble revetment up to the level of the galleries, and extensive surviving mosaics and frescoes above that. On the dome the mosaic of the Pantokrator, surrounded by angels, and 12 prophets between the drum's windows. These mosaics were probably executed by artists from outside Epirus. 16th-century frescoes by the painter Ananias survive in the altar, while 17th-century frescoes decorate the main church. The church's decoration also displays a number of Western influences in its sculptural program, such as Romanesque monsters and reliefs depicting Biblical scenes.

== See also ==
- Ancient Roman and Byzantine domes
