= Arta, Greece =

City in Epirus, Greece

Arta Άρτα
- Municipality
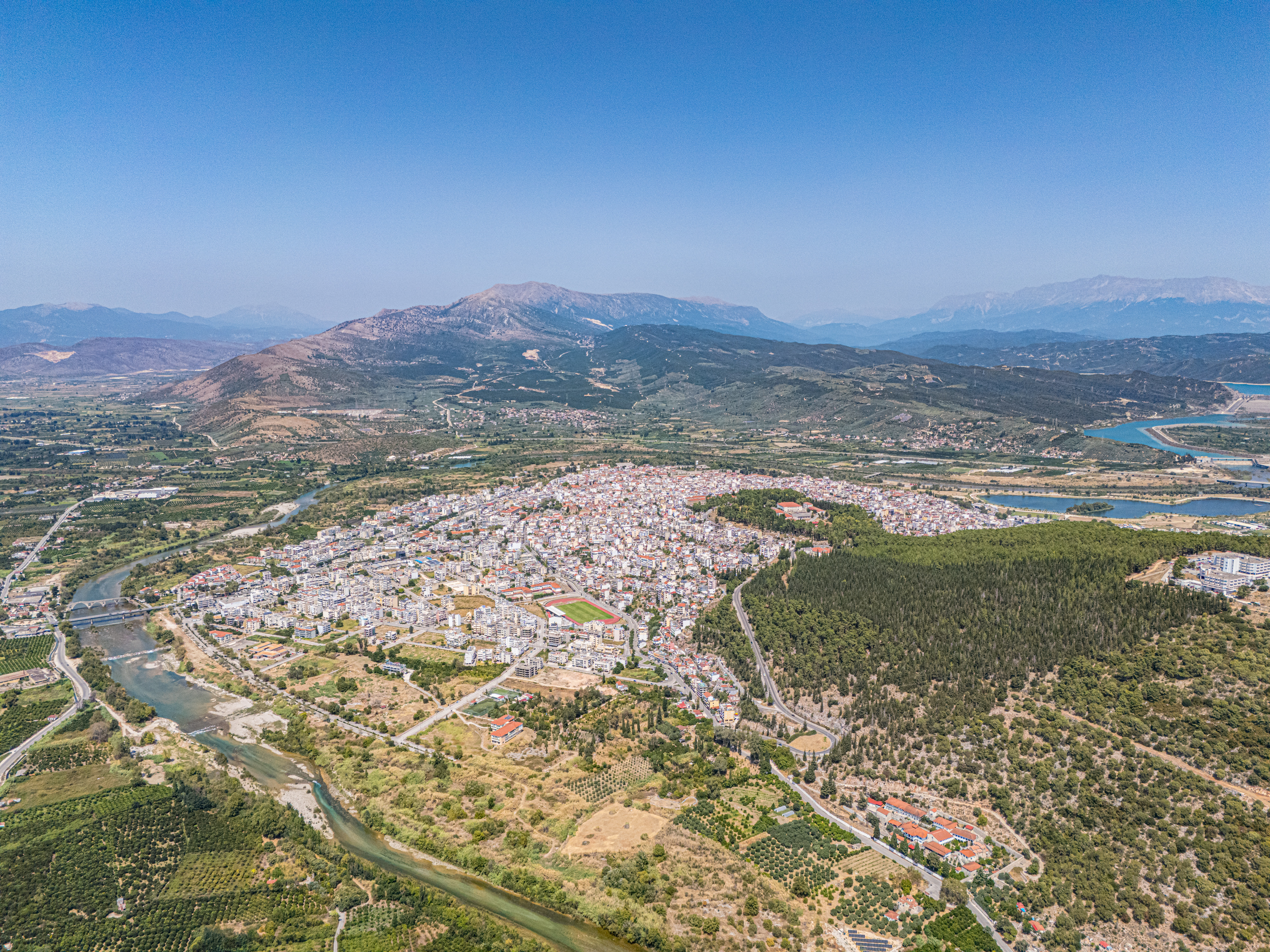
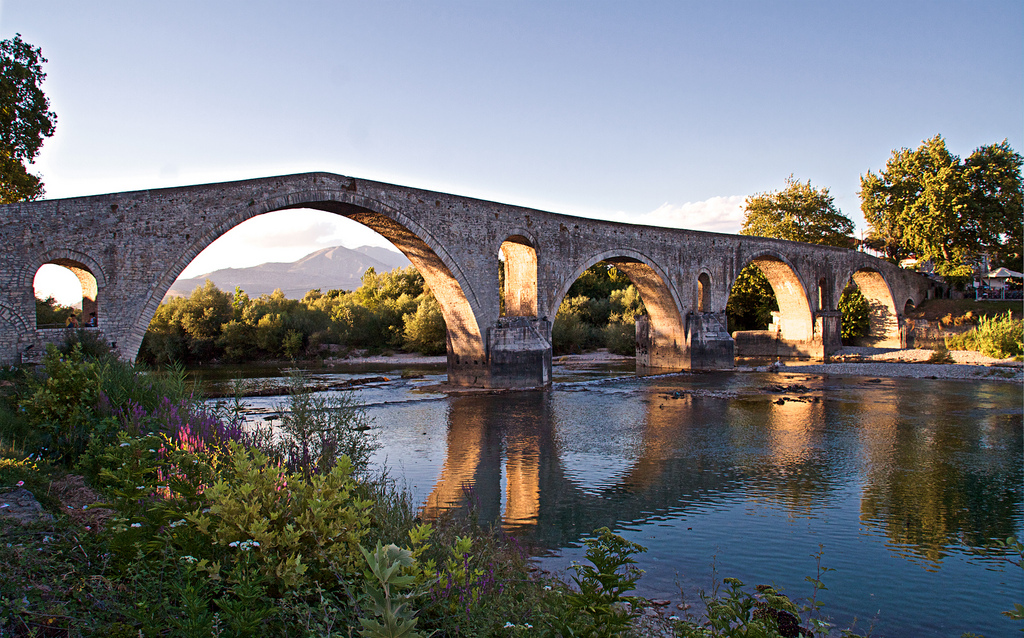
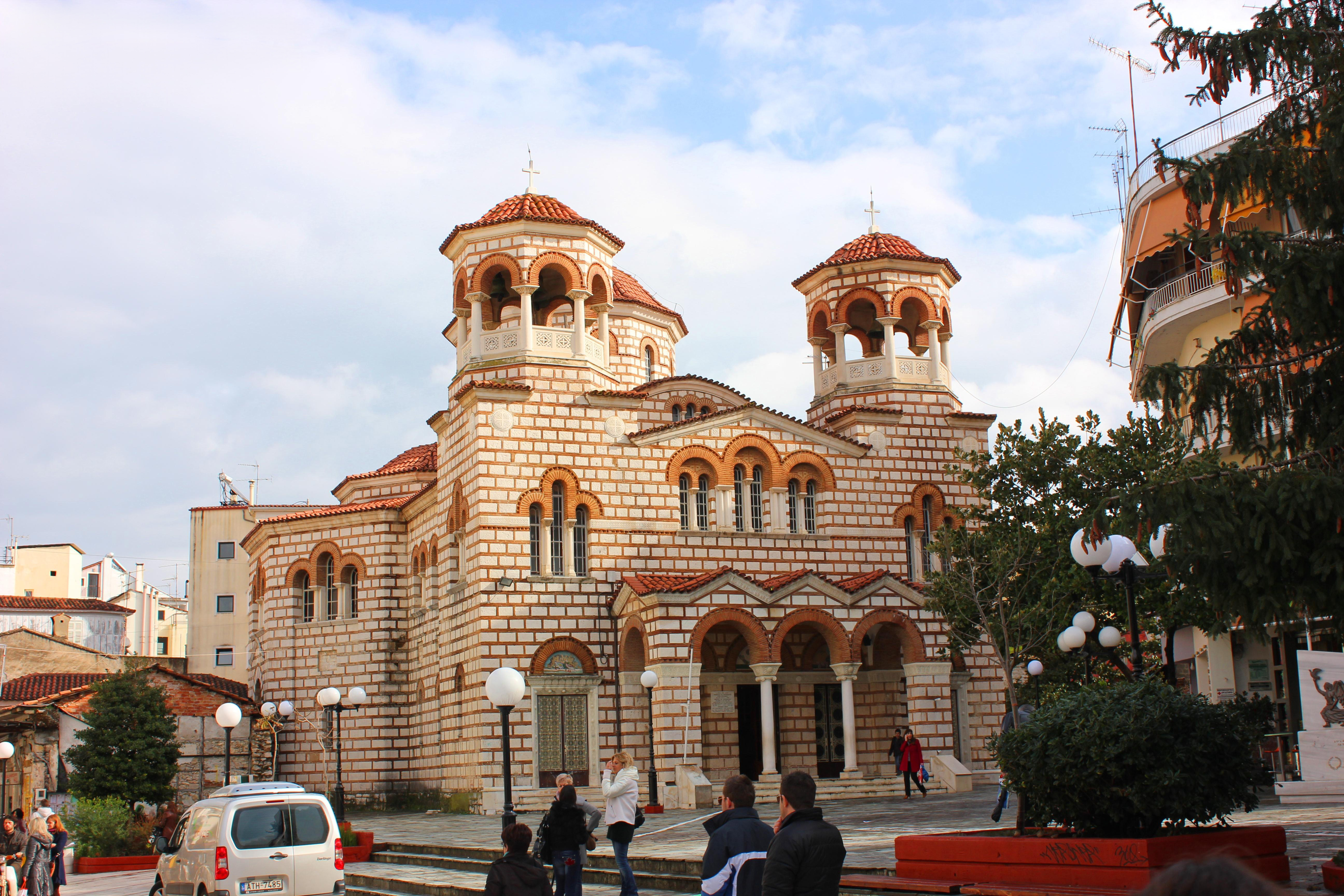
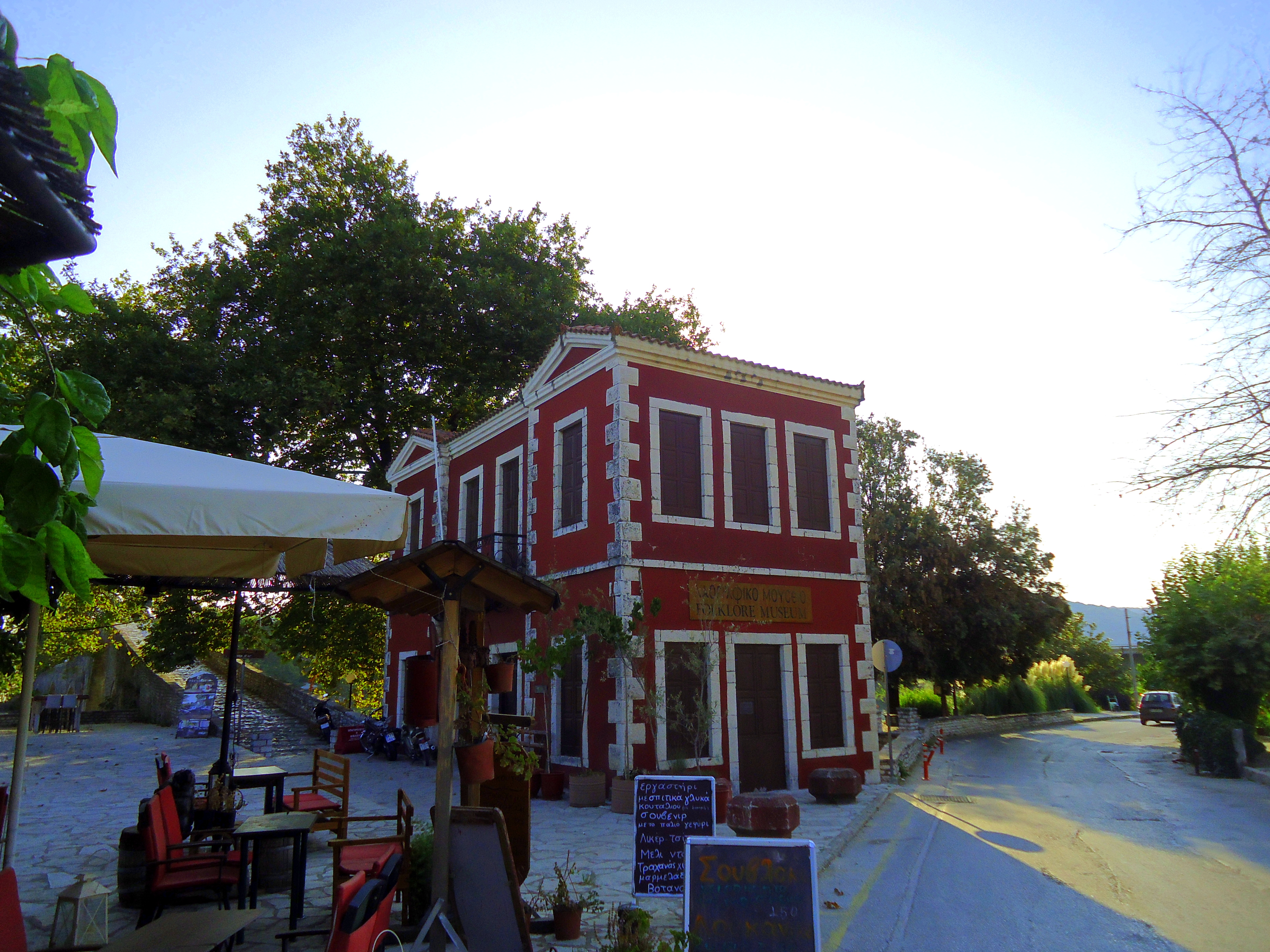
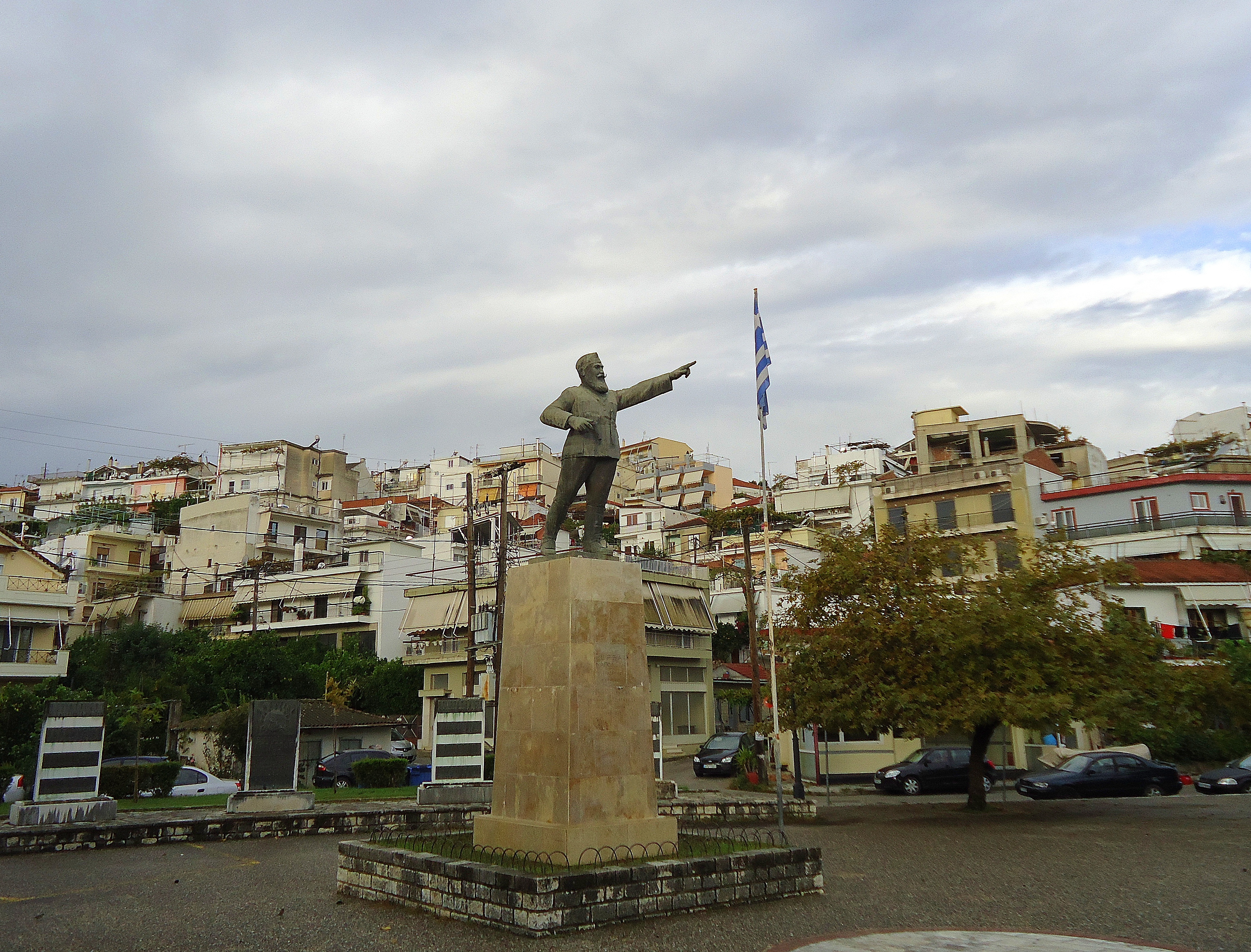
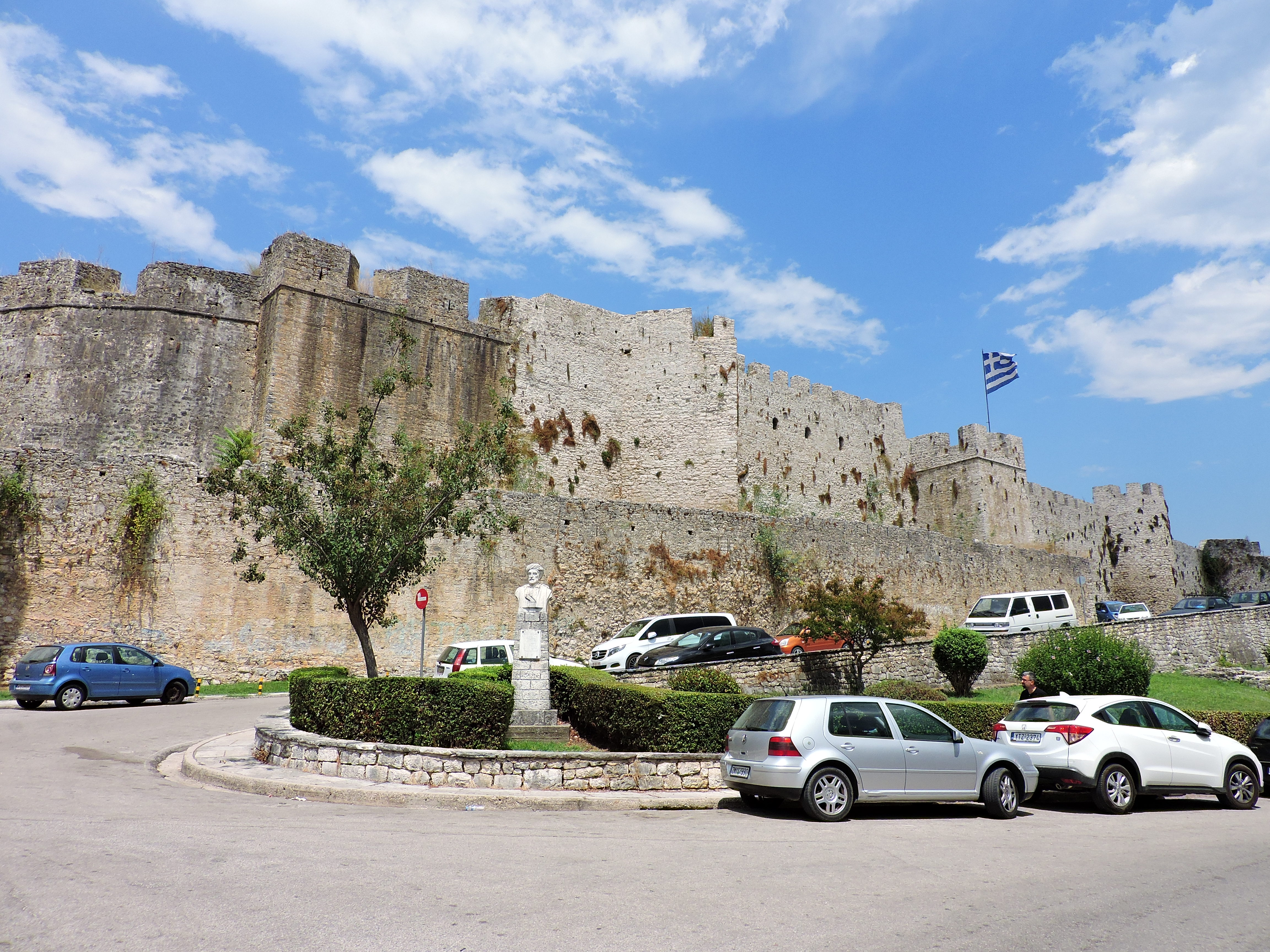
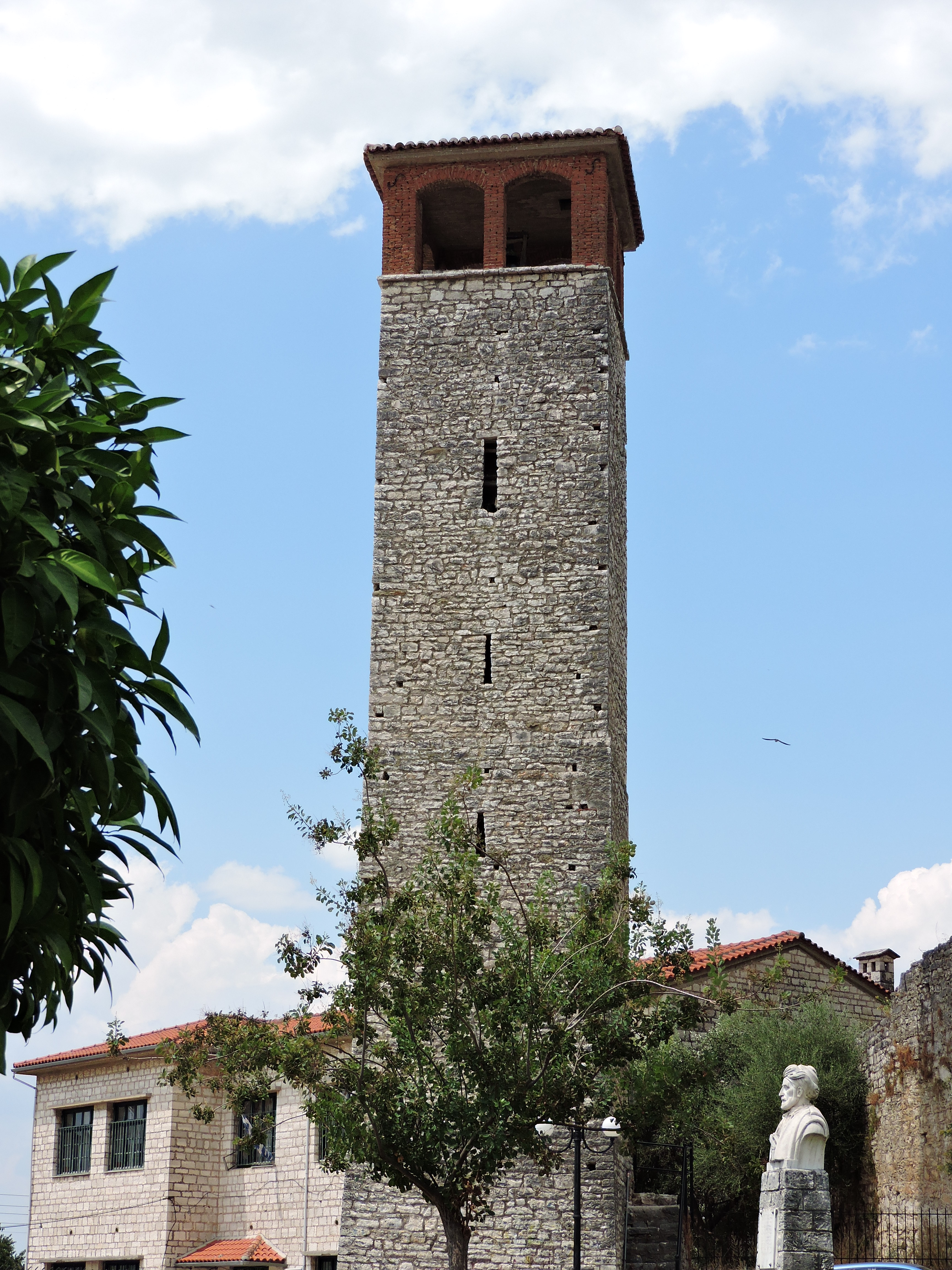
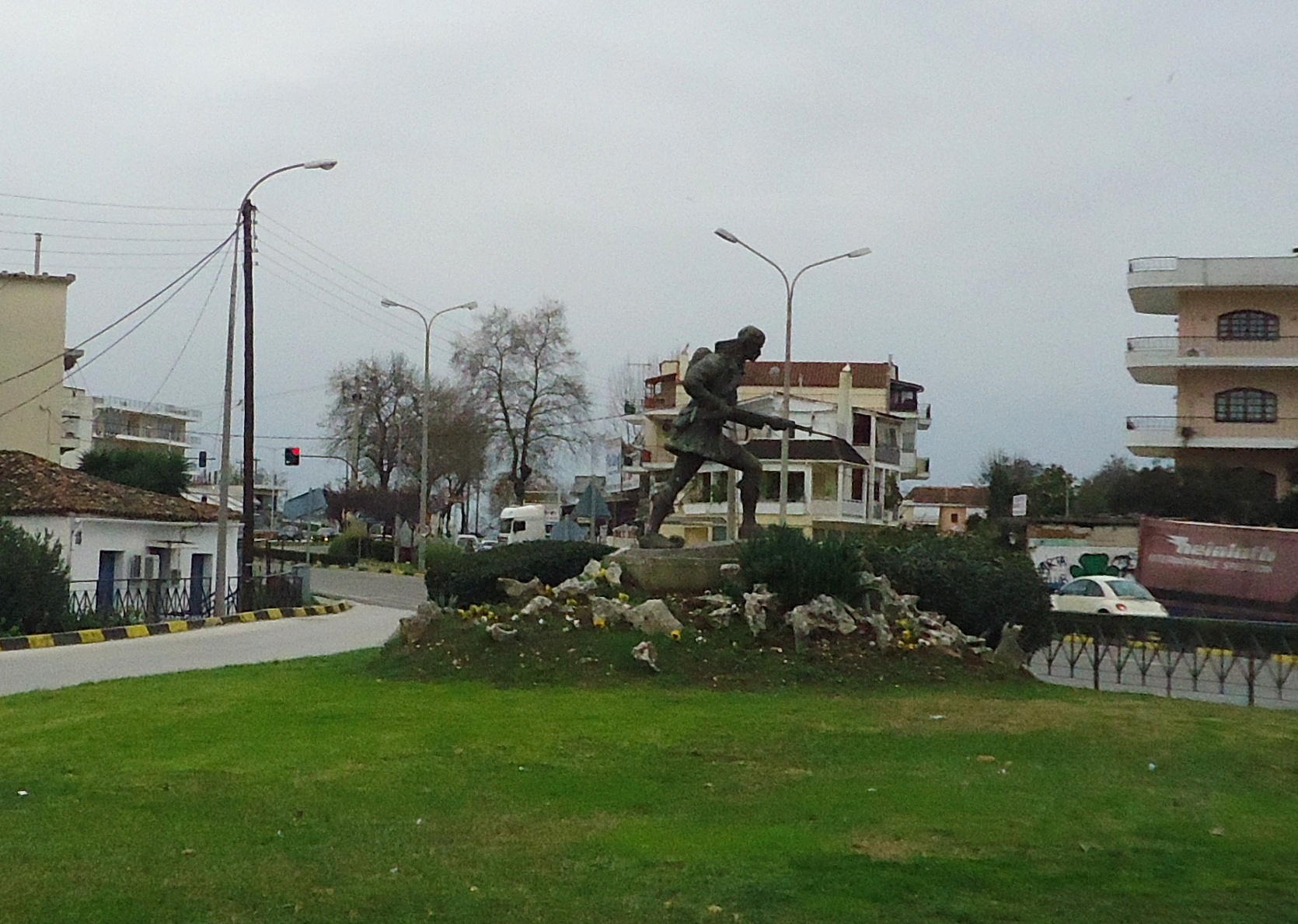
- From top left: Aerial view of the city; Bridge of Arta over the Arachthos river; Church of Saint Demetrius; Folklore Museum of Arta; statue of Napoleon Zervas; Castle of Arta; clock tower of the Arta Castle; statue of "Tsolias of 1917" by Lefteris Valakas

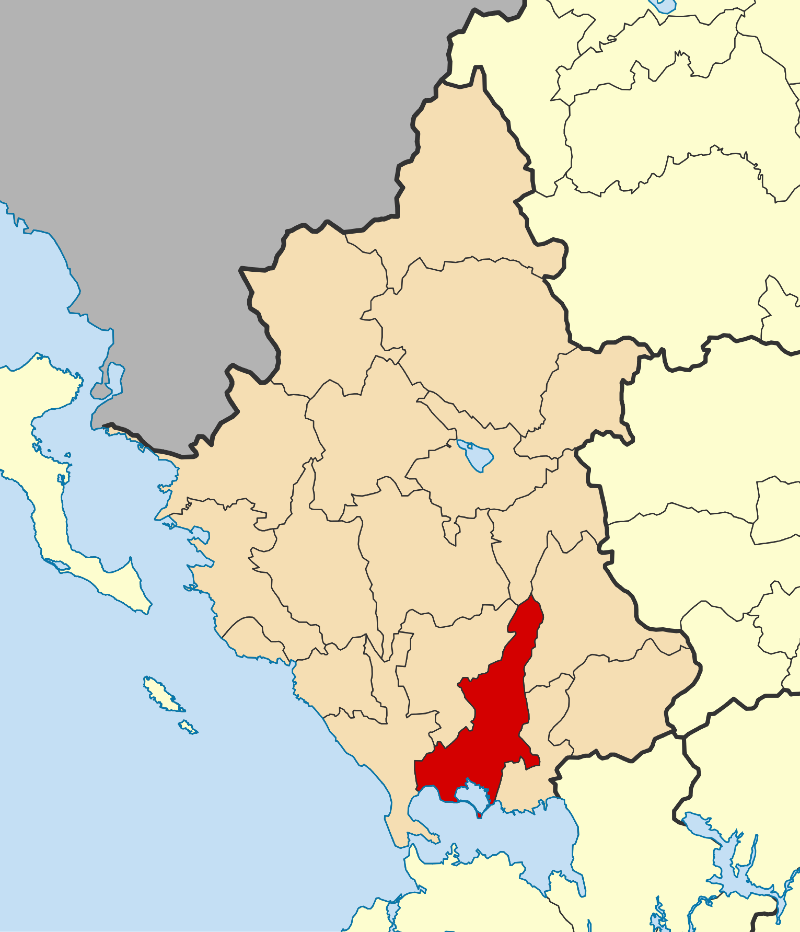

- Location within Greece
- Coordinates: 39°09′54″N 20°59′15″E
- Country: Greece
- Administrative region: Epirus
- Regional unit: Arta

Government
  - Mayor: Christoforos Siafakas (since 2023)

Area
  - Municipality: 457.2 km^{2} (176.5 sq mi)
  - Municipal unit: 47.973 km^{2} (18.522 sq mi)
- Elevation: 30 m (98 ft)

Population (2021)
  - Municipality: 41,600
  - Density: 91.0/km^{2} (236/sq mi)
  - Municipal unit: 26,999
  - Municipal unit density: 562.80/km^{2} (1,457.6/sq mi)
  - Community: 24,079
- Demonym(s): Artean (Greek: Artinos)
- Time zone: UTC+2 (EET)
  - Summer (DST): UTC+3 (EEST)
- Postal code: 471 00
- Area code: 26810
- Vehicle registration: ΑΤ
- Website: www.arta.gr

Arta (Greek: Άρτα) is a city in northwestern Greece and the capital of the regional unit of Arta, in the region of Epirus. The city was known in antiquity as Ambracia (Ancient Greek: Ἀμβρακία) and had served as the capital of ancient Epirus. Arta is known for its medieval bridge over the Arachthos River, as well as for its ancient sites from the era of Pyrrhus of Epirus and its well-preserved 13th-century castle. Arta's Byzantine history is reflected in its many Byzantine churches; perhaps the best known is the Panagia Paregoretissa (Mother of God the Consoling), built in about 1290 by Despot Nikephoros I Komnenos Doukas.

== Etymology ==
The origin of the city's name is quite uncertain. It is either derived from a corruption of the river Arachthos, or from the Latin word "artus" (narrow), or from the Slavic word "balta" (swamp).

== History ==
=== Antiquity ===
The first settlement in the area of the modern city dates to the 9th century BC. Ambracia was founded as a colony of Corinth in the 7th century BC. In 294 BC, after 43 years of semi-autonomy under Macedonian suzerainty, Ambracia was given to Pyrrhus, king of the Molossians and of Epirus, who made it his capital, using Ambracia as a base to attack the Romans. Pyrrhus managed to achieve great but costly victories against the Romans, hence the phrase "Pyrrhic victory" which refers in particular to an exchange at the Battle of Asculum. Nevertheless, Pyrrhus found the time and means to adorn his capital with a palace, temples and theatres. In 146 BC, Ambracia became part of the Roman Republic.

=== Middle Ages ===
Despite the existence of several churches from the 9th and 10th centuries, Arta is first attested only in 1082, when the Normans under Bohemond laid siege to the city. The origin and etymology of the name is uncertain and debated. In the Komnenian period, the city flourished as a commercial centre, with links to Venice, and rose to become a bishopric by 1157. The Jewish traveller Benjamin of Tudela visited the area in 1165.

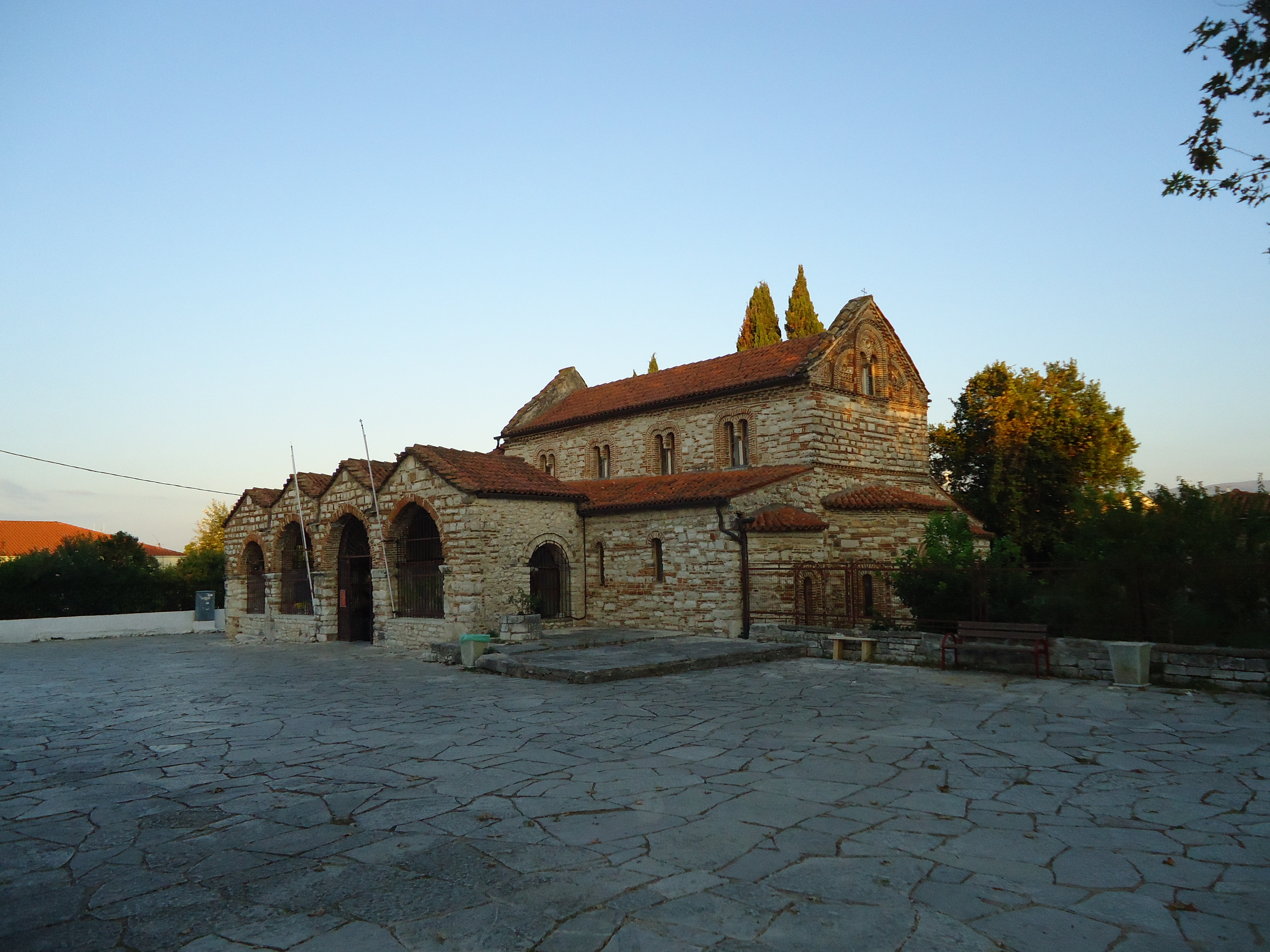
Byzantine church of St Theodora of Arta (11th century)

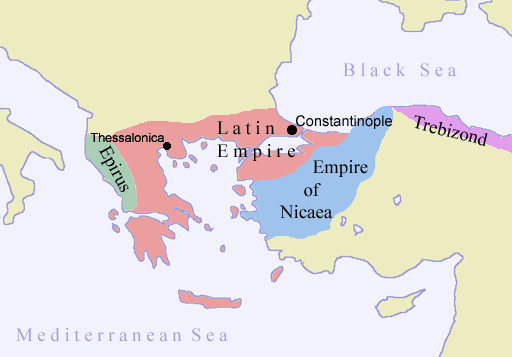
The Despotate of Epirus (green) in 1204

By the end of the 12th century, Arta probably formed a distinct fiscal district (episkepsis) within the wider theme of Nicopolis. After the fall of Constantinople to the Fourth Crusade, it is recorded as the pertinentia de Arta in the Partitio Romaniae treaty of 1204, and assigned to Venice.

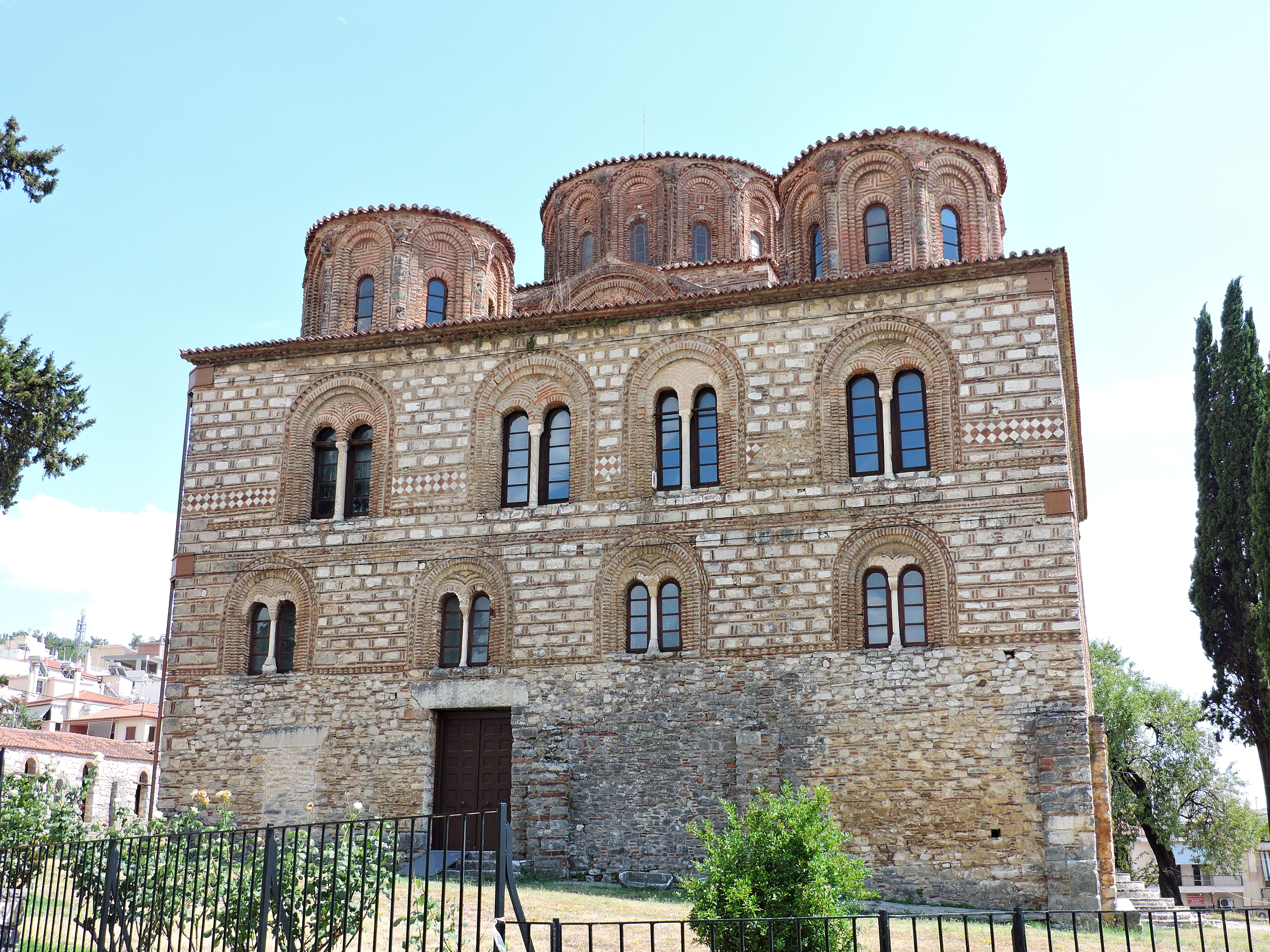
The 13th-century Church of the Parigoritissa, formerly site of the Archaeological Collection of Arta.

The Venetians did not take control, however, for in 1205 Michael I Komnenos Doukas came to the city, succeeded its previous Byzantine governor, and quickly established a new principality, which is known by historians as the Despotate of Epirus. Arta remained the capital of the new principality for most of its history, and flourished as a result. The city experienced considerable building activity, with the renovation of older churches and the construction of new ones, most notably the Church of the Parigoritissa and the Church of the Kato Panagia. Sometime after 1227 it received fortifications, and was the site of regional Church councils in 1213, 1219, and 1225. The 15th-century Chronicle of the Tocco describes it as "the center of a fertile agricultural region with many water buffaloes, cows, and horses". The city had trade links to Venice—a Venetian consul is attested in 1284 and 1314/19—and Ragusa, exporting dried meat, lard, ham, furs, and indigo. Archaeological finds also attest to a local ceramic industry.

After the Battle of Pelagonia in 1259, the city was occupied by the troops of the rival Greek successor state, the Empire of Nicaea, (which restored the Byzantine Empire in 1261) but was soon recovered for Epirus by John I Doukas. Another attack by the Byzantine emperor Andronikos II Palaiologos in 1292, by land and sea, was unsuccessful. In 1303, the city was besieged for a month by the Angevins under Charles II of Naples. In 1313, much of the city was destroyed in a great fire. In the next year, Byzantine troops under the pinkernes John attacked Epirus, including Arta.

In 1318, the last male-line descendant of Michael I, Thomas I Komnenos Doukas, was assassinated by his nephew, the Count of Cephalonia Nicholas Orsini, and Epirus passed to the Italian Orsini family. Nicholas was in turn murdered in 1323 by his brother John II Orsini. In 1331, Arta, as well as Leucas and other areas, were occupied by Walter VI of Brienne, and John Orsini was forced to accept Angevin suzerainty. John's death in 1335 left Epirus in the weak hands of the young Nikephoros II Orsini and his mother Anna Palaiologina, and the Byzantine emperor Andronikos III Palaiologos availed himself of the opportunity to occupy and annex Epirus.

Byzantine rule was unpopular, and in 1339 a revolt broke out, with Arta joining it, under a certain Nicholas Basilitzes. Andronikos III and his commander-in-chief, John Kantakouzenos, campaigned in person in Epirus and captured the rebel fortresses one by one, either by siege or through negotiations. By the end of 1340, Byzantine rule was restored, and John Angelos took his seat as imperial governor in Arta.

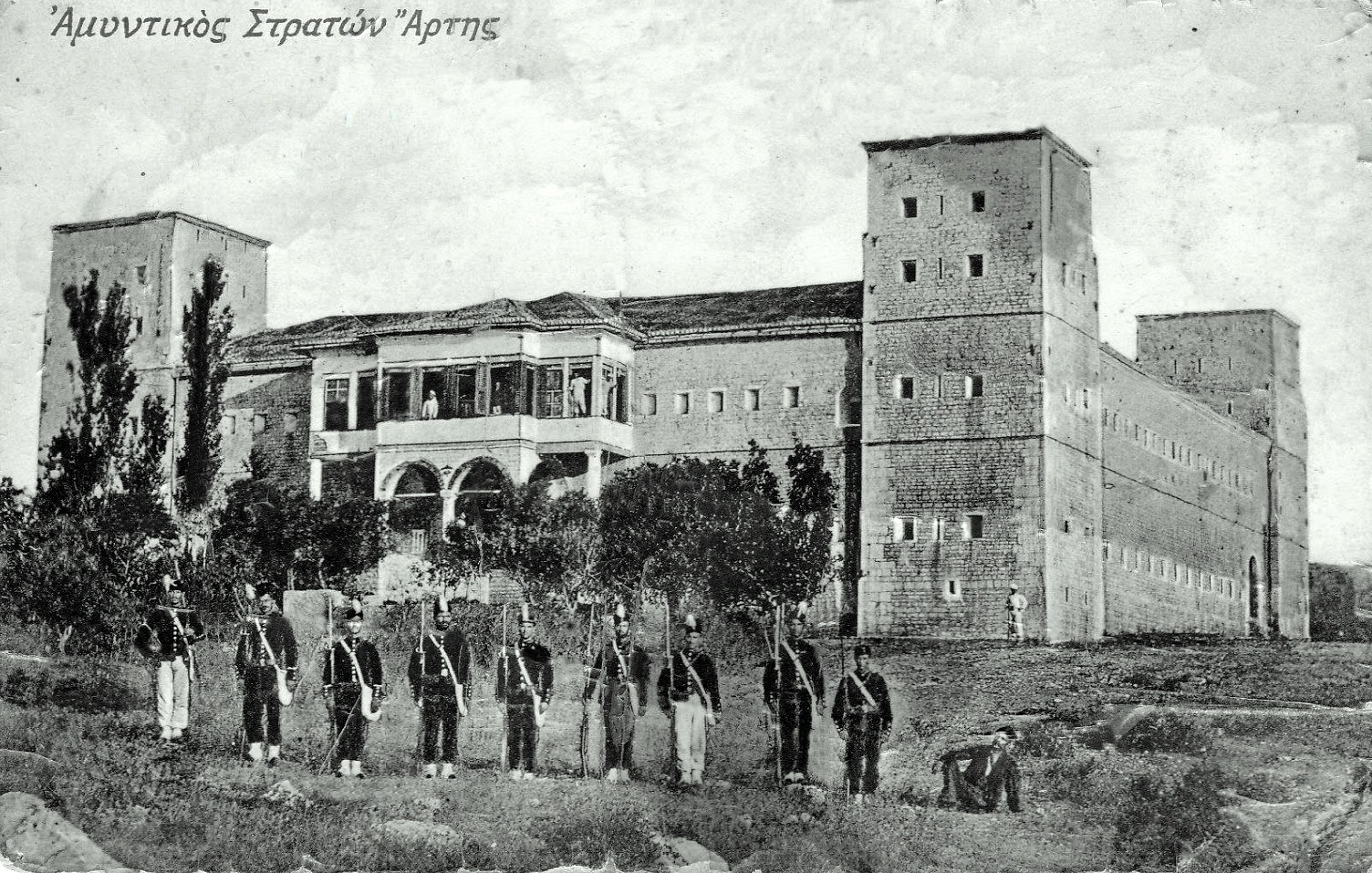
The Greek defensive barrack, 1881

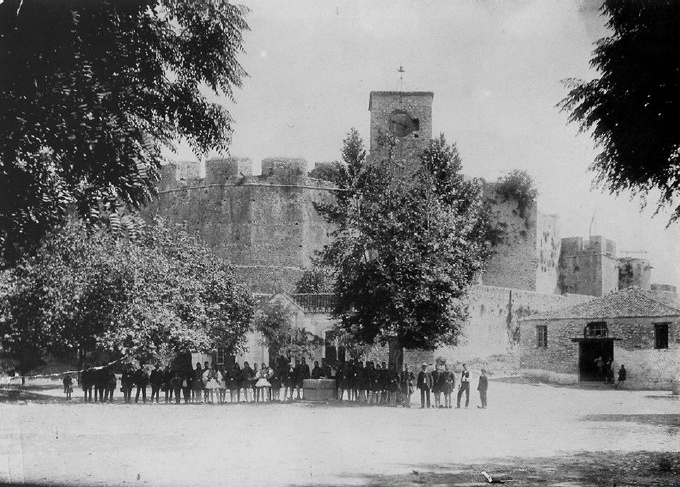
Old photo of Arta with the clocktower, 1910

Aided by the Byzantine civil war of 1341–1347 and an outbreak of the Black Death that devastated the region, Arta with the rest of Epirus fell under the rule of the Serbian king Stefan Dušan in autumn 1347. Dushan's half-brother Simeon Uroš, who married John II Orsini's daughter Thomais Orsini, was appointed governor of Epirus. The city remained part of the new Serbian Empire until Dushan's death in 1355. Nikephoros II Orsini recovered Epirus in 1356/7, but his death in the Battle of Achelous against the Albanian tribes that had invaded the region, meant that Arta returned to the (rather nominal) rule of Simeon Uroš, who preferred to reside in Thessaly rather than Epirus. This left Epirus open to increasing Albanian migration, who soon captured most of Epirus, except for Ioannina. In 1367 or shortly after, Arta too was captured, and became the centre of the "Despotate of Arta", until 1374 under Pjetër Losha and then Gjin Bua Shpata. The Albanian rulers managed to withstand attacks by the Angevins (sometime between 1374 and 1384), as well as by the Grand Master of the Knights Hospitaller Juan Fernández de Heredia in 1378, but in 1384 the city was plundered by the Ottoman Turks.

From 1401/02, Carlo I Tocco, the ambitious Count of Cephalonia, began launching attacks on Arta, taking advantage of the Albanians' infighting. Despite the Albanians' calling on Ottoman aid, in 1416 Tocco captured Arta after a long siege. Having taken control of Ioannina in 1411, Tocco thus reunited the core of the old Epirote realm, and received recognition from both the Ottomans and the Byzantine emperor. After Carlo I's death in 1429, he was succeeded by his nephew Carlo II Tocco. In 1449, the city fell to the Ottomans.

=== Ottoman period ===
Under Ottoman rule, the town was called in Turkish Narda. It was occupied by Venetians in 1717 and the French in 1797, but the Ottomans retook it in 1799. Several battles took place near the city during the Greek War of Independence.

In 1776, the town was composed of approximately 8,000 to 10,000 Greeks, 200 Turks and 200 Jews. At the time, Arta specialized in producing wheat, wine, tobacco and shipbuilding timber.

=== Modern era ===
The city was finally annexed to the Greek Kingdom in 1881 with the Convention of Constantinople.

In March 1944, most of the Jewish community (384 members at the time) was arrested by the Nazis and deported to the extermination camps.

== Climate ==
Arta has a hot-summer Mediterranean climate (Csa) with hot, dry summers and cool, rainy winters. Like much of Western Greece, it receives plenty of precipitation, making it one of the wettest cities in Greece.

Climate data for Arta (1976–2010)
Month	Jan	Feb	Mar	Apr	May	Jun	Jul	Aug	Sep	Oct	Nov	Dec	Year
Mean daily maximum °C (°F)	13.3 (55.9)	14.0 (57.2)	16.7 (62.1)	20.1 (68.2)	25.0 (77.0)	29.1 (84.4)	31.8 (89.2)	32.0 (89.6)	29.0 (84.2)	24.1 (75.4)	19.0 (66.2)	14.9 (58.8)	22.4 (72.4)
Daily mean °C (°F)	8.7 (47.7)	9.4 (48.9)	11.9 (53.4)	15.2 (59.4)	19.9 (67.8)	24.0 (75.2)	26.5 (79.7)	26.5 (79.7)	23.1 (73.6)	18.3 (64.9)	13.5 (56.3)	9.9 (49.8)	17.2 (63.0)
Mean daily minimum °C (°F)	4.7 (40.5)	5.2 (41.4)	7.0 (44.6)	9.9 (49.8)	13.9 (57.0)	17.3 (63.1)	19.5 (67.1)	19.9 (67.8)	17.1 (62.8)	13.4 (56.1)	9.4 (48.9)	6.0 (42.8)	11.9 (53.5)
Average precipitation mm (inches)	129.6 (5.10)	125.4 (4.94)	91.6 (3.61)	81.3 (3.20)	44.8 (1.76)	19.8 (0.78)	13.4 (0.53)	14.7 (0.58)	61.5 (2.42)	128.3 (5.05)	199.8 (7.87)	189.7 (7.47)	1,099.9 (43.31)
Average precipitation days	12.1	11.1	10.6	9.6	7.4	4.2	2.5	2.5	4.9	8.1	11.9	13.0	97.9
Average relative humidity (%)	71.7	70.6	68.9	68.8	66.0	61.4	59.2	59.4	63.6	67.7	74.1	73.2	67.1
Source: Hellenic National Meteorological Service

== Landmarks ==
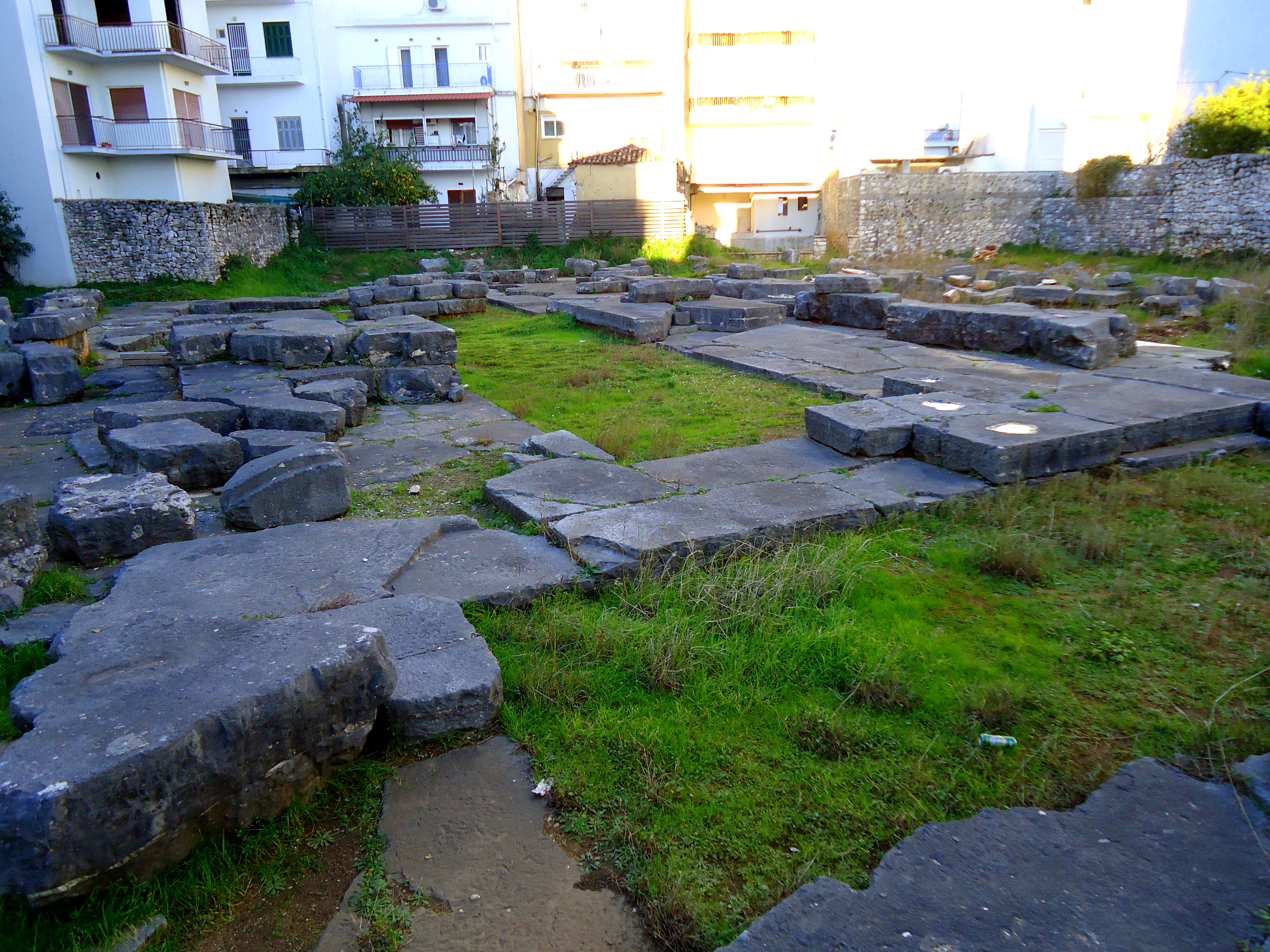
Ruins of the ancient temple of Apollo Pythios Soter

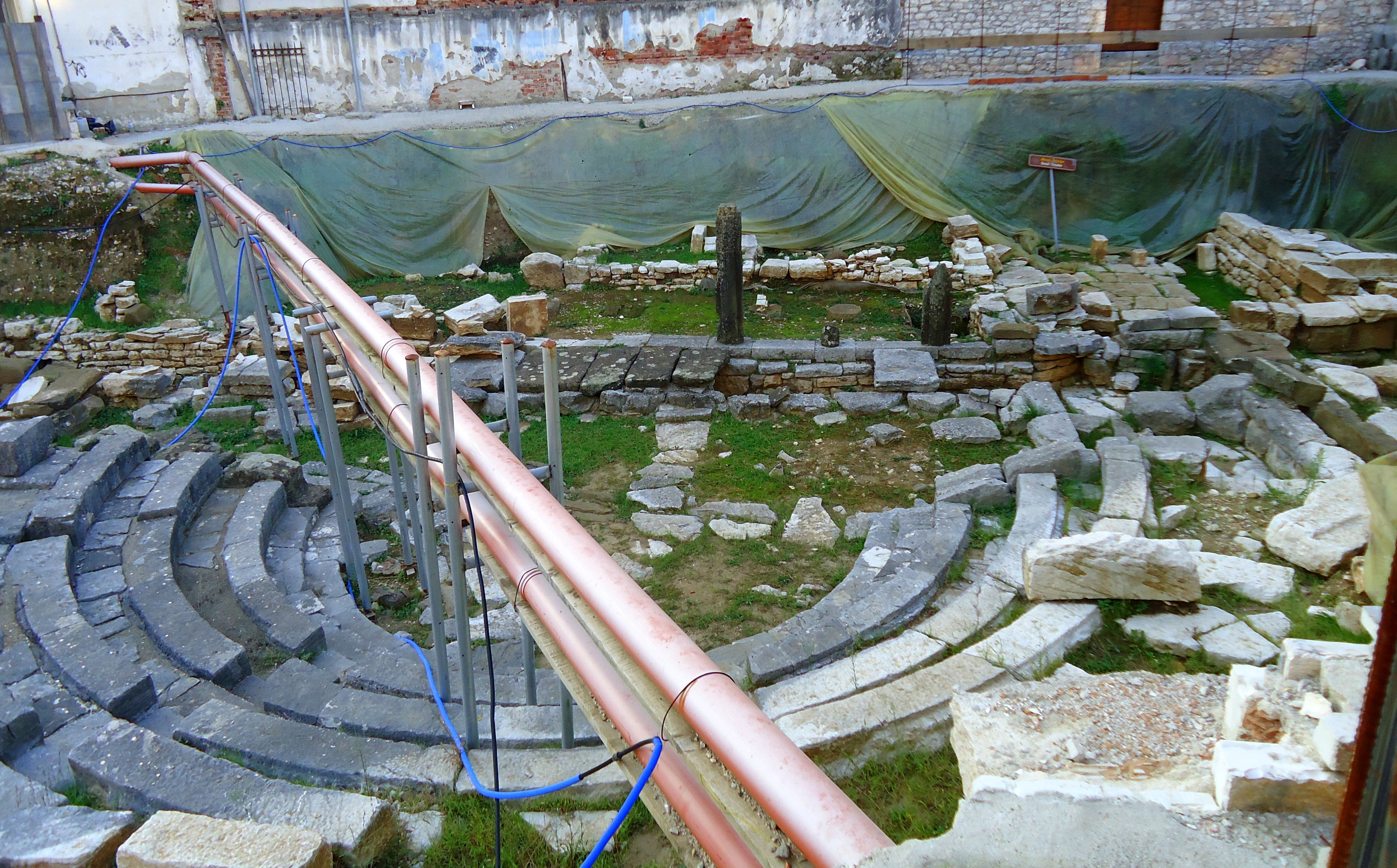
Small ancient theatre

=== Classical ===
The modern city is on the site of ancient Ambracia. Remains of the classic era include the ancient walls, the ruins of an ancient temple of Apollo, a small theatre, and remnants of the southwest cemetery.

=== Byzantine and later ===
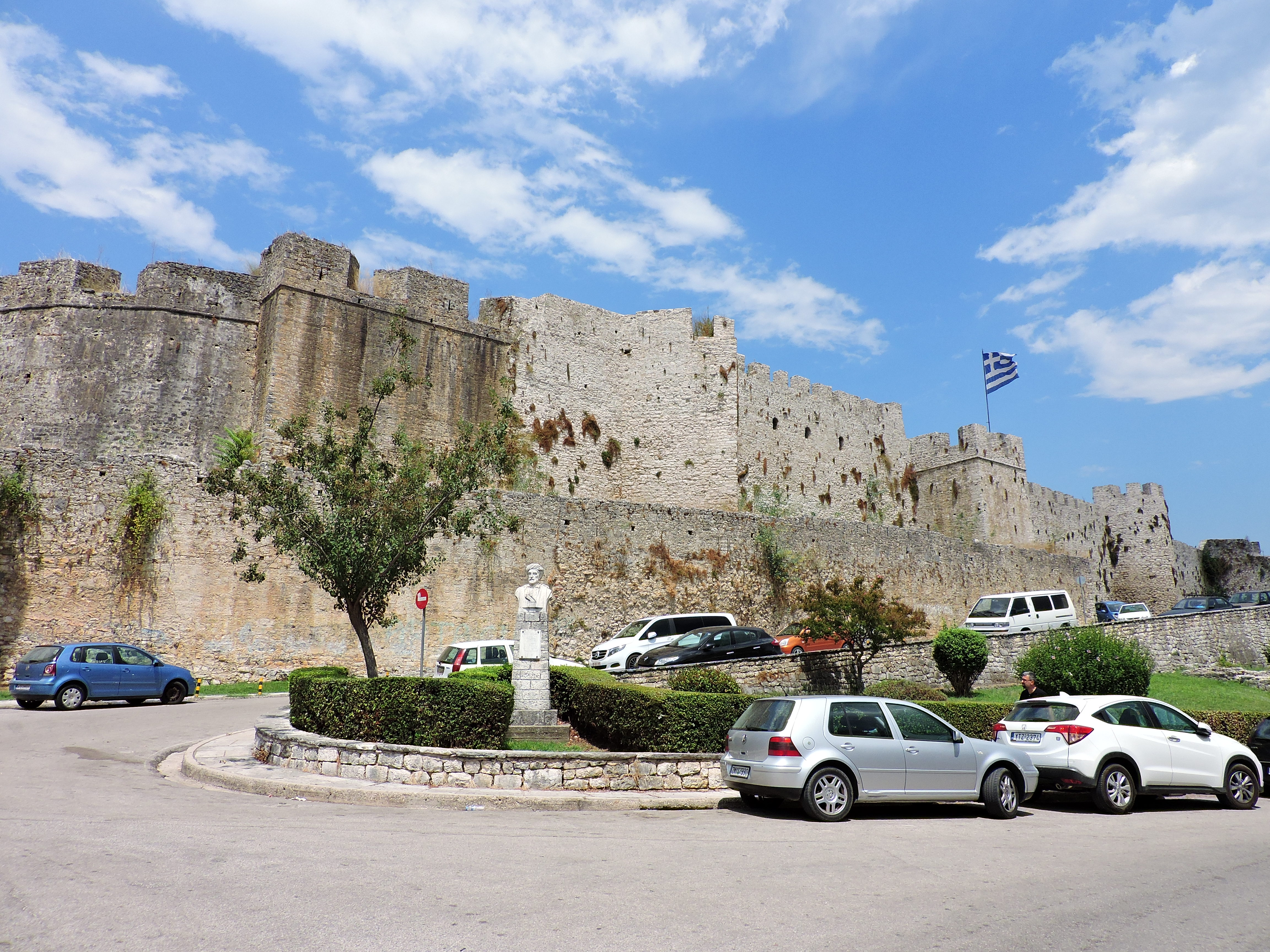
View of the Byzantine castle

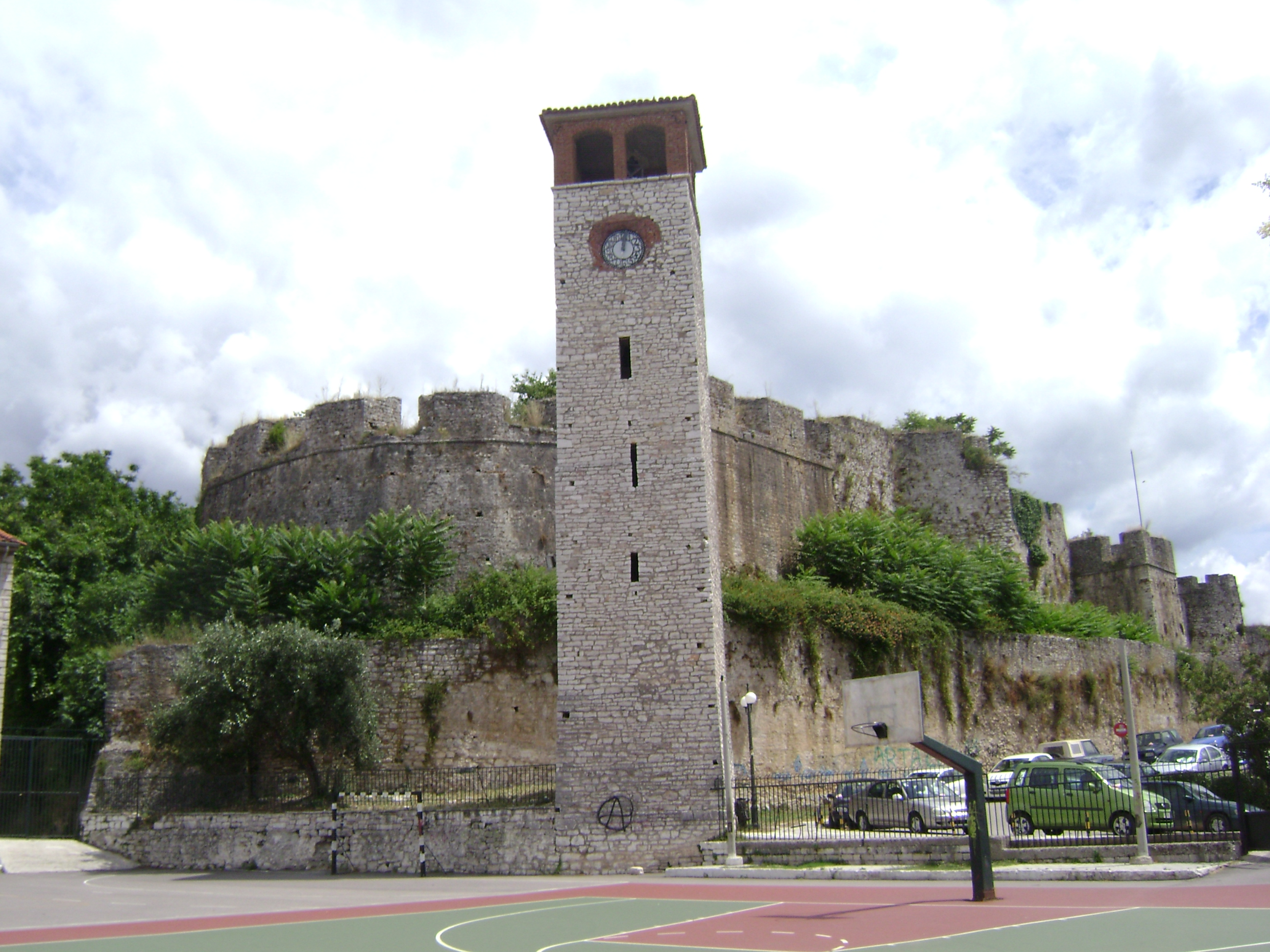
Clocktower in front of the castle

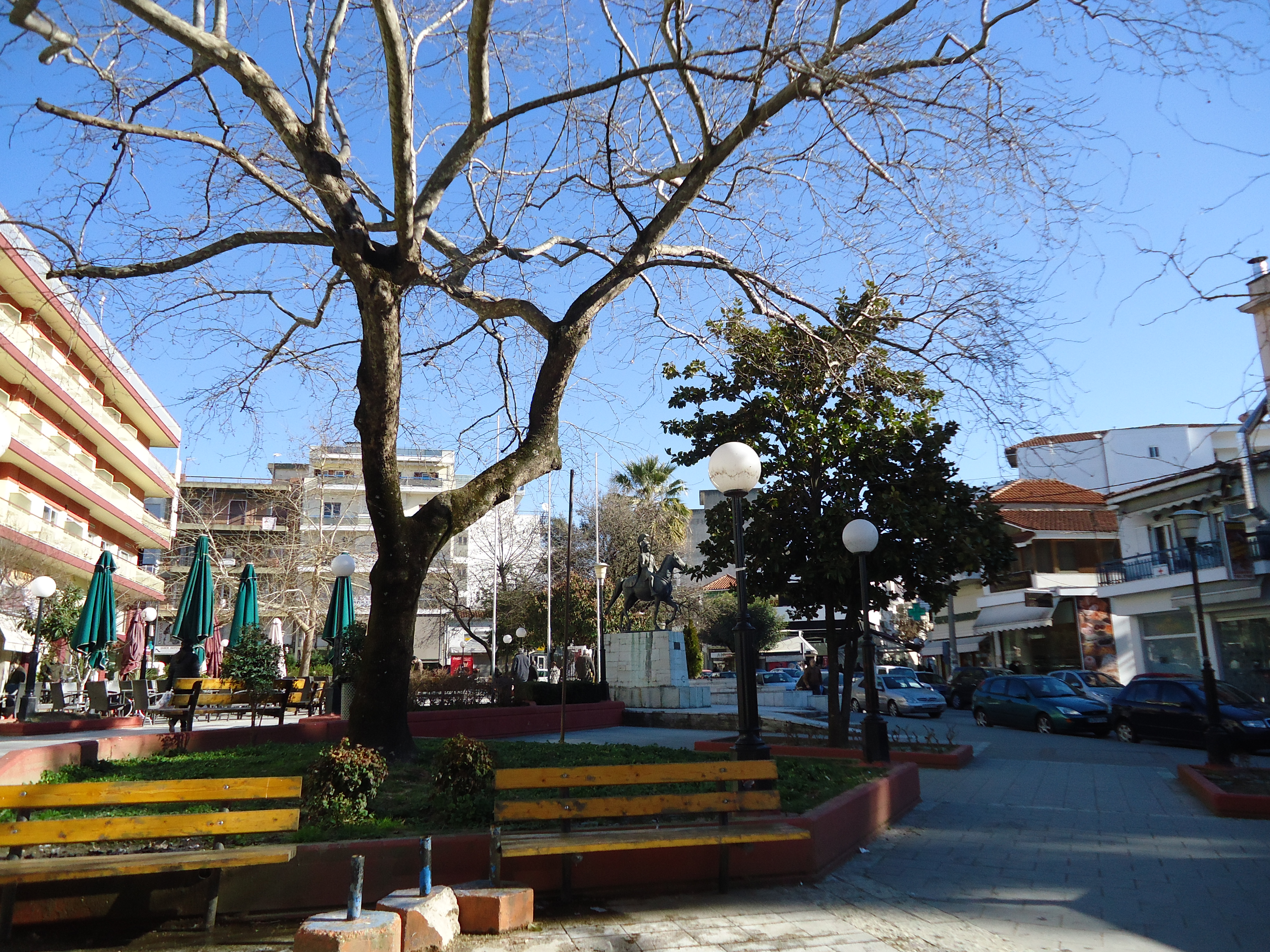
Kilkis Square

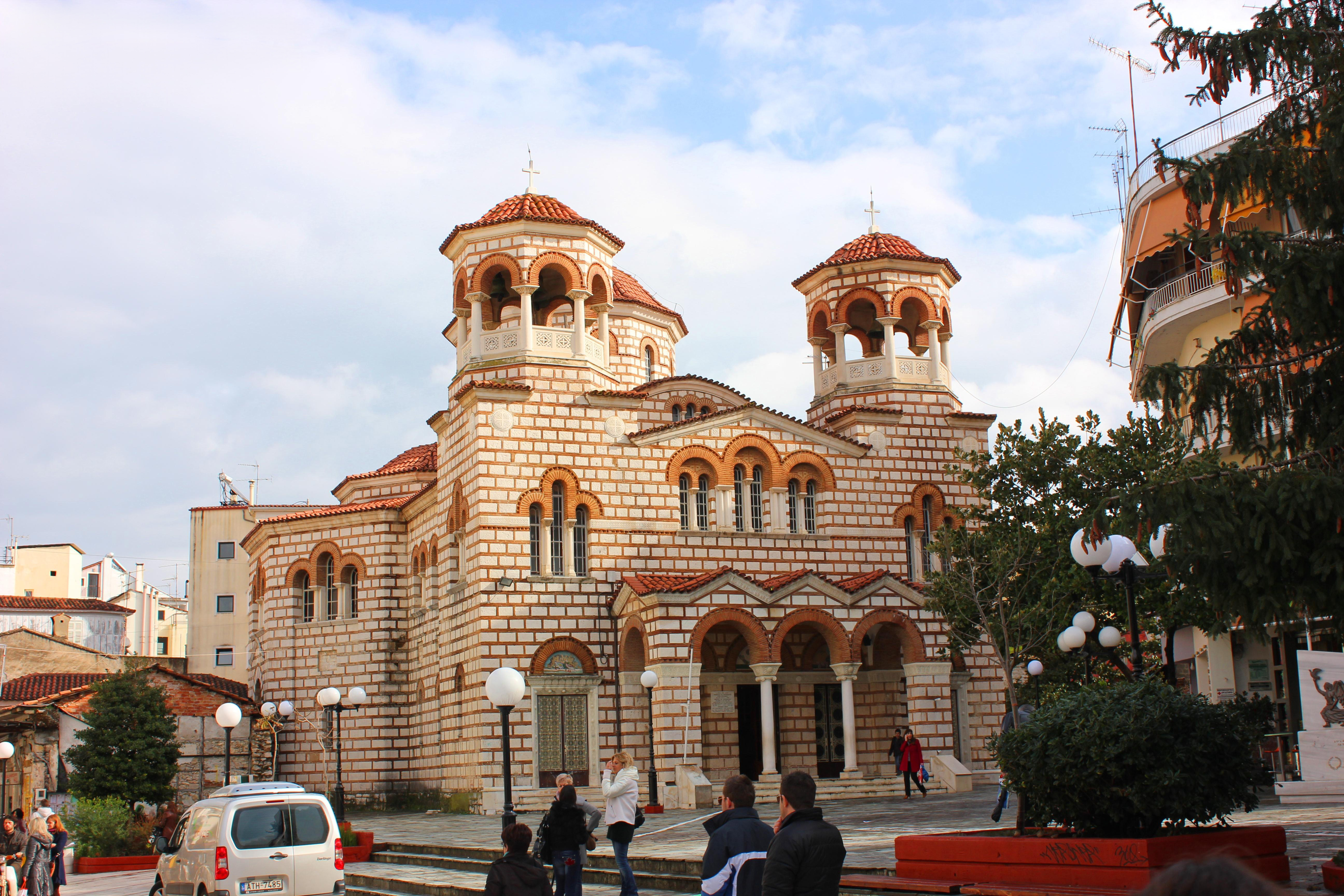
Saint Demetrius of Thessaloniki church

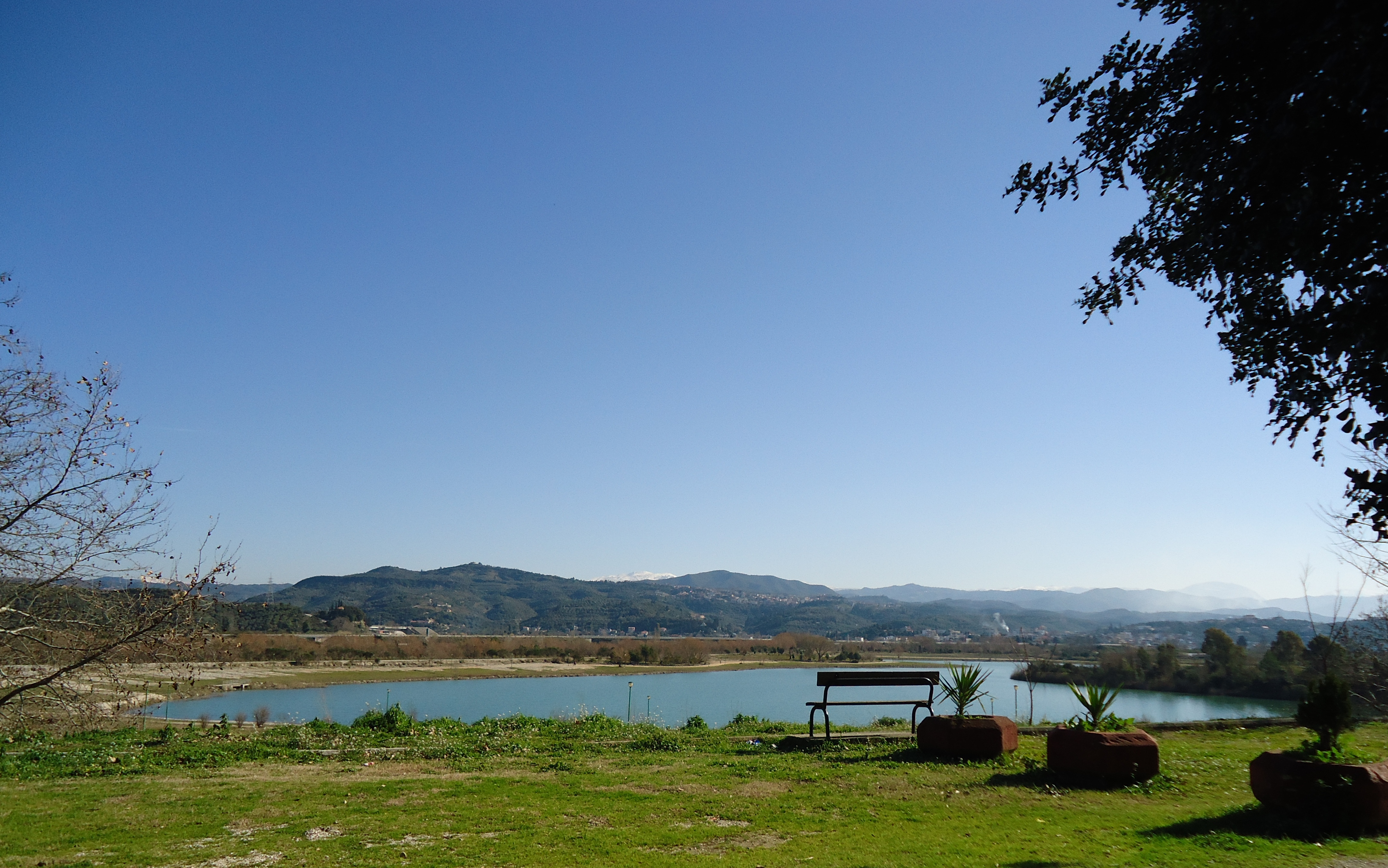
Artificial lake of Arta

The town's fortifications, including the Castle of Arta, were built by Michael I Komnenos Doukas in the early 13th century, but their present form is largely post-Byzantine. Secular architecture from the Byzantine period, including the palace of the Despots of Epirus, has vanished completely, but the city preserves numerous churches.

The most important Byzantine church is the cathedral Church of the Paregoretissa, built ca. 1290 by Nikephoros I Komnenos Doukas and his wife Anna Palaiologina Kantakouzene. Other important churches of the late Byzantine period are the Church of the Kato Panagia, built by Nikephoros I's father Michael II Komnenos Doukas, and the Monastery of Saint Theodora, housing the tomb of the city's patron, Theodora of Arta. Several other churches dating to the 9th and 10th centuries also survive in and around the city: Saint Basil of the Bridge, Saint Demetrios of Katsoures in Plisioi, the Panagia Blacherna Monastery, the Panagia Vryoni in Neochoraki, the Red Church in Vourgareli, the Panagia of Koronisia in Koronisia and the Church of the Pantanassa in Filippiada.

=== Museums ===
- Archaeological Museum of Arta
- Church of the Paregoretissa
- Folk museum 'Skoufas'
- Historical museum 'Skoufas'
- Private folk museum in Kypseli.
- Archaeological museum of Koronisia

== Education ==
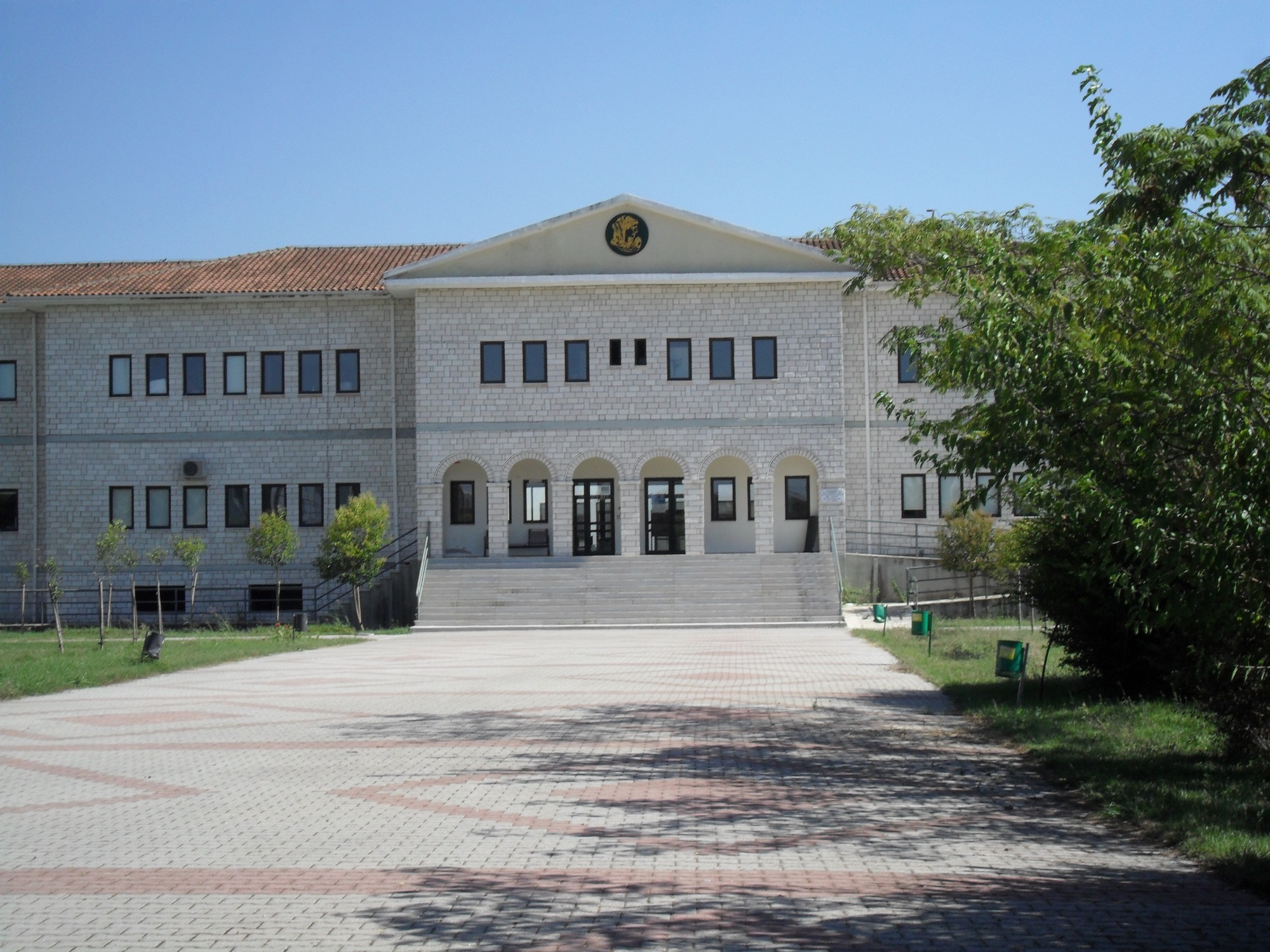
A building of the University of Ioannina department in Arta

Arta has several university departments belonging to the university of Ioannina.

== Transportation ==
Arta is located NNW of Antirrio, Messolongi and Agrinio, NE of Preveza, SSE of Ioannina and nearly SW of Trikala.

Regular bus lines connect Arta with all the bigger Greek cities. A bus to Athens departs several times a day, and the trip takes about 5 hours.

The city is linked with the EO5 national road (Antirrio–Ioannina) and the EO30 which links with Peta and Trikala. The Arachthos River flows to the west with its reservoir lying directly to the north.

== Municipality ==
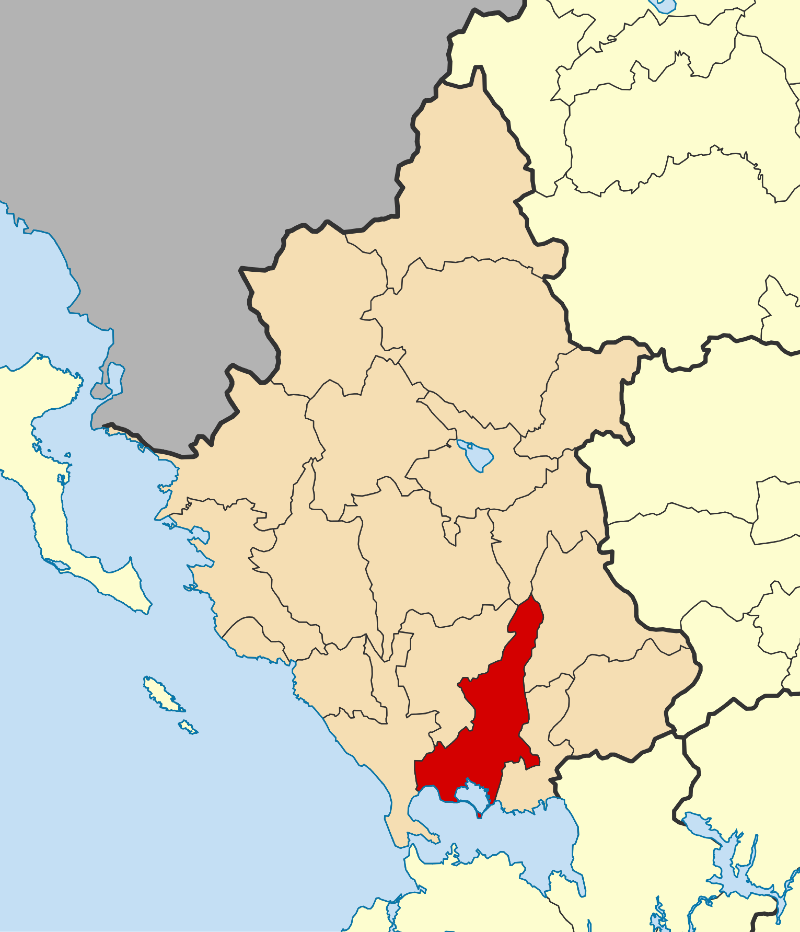
Arta municipality

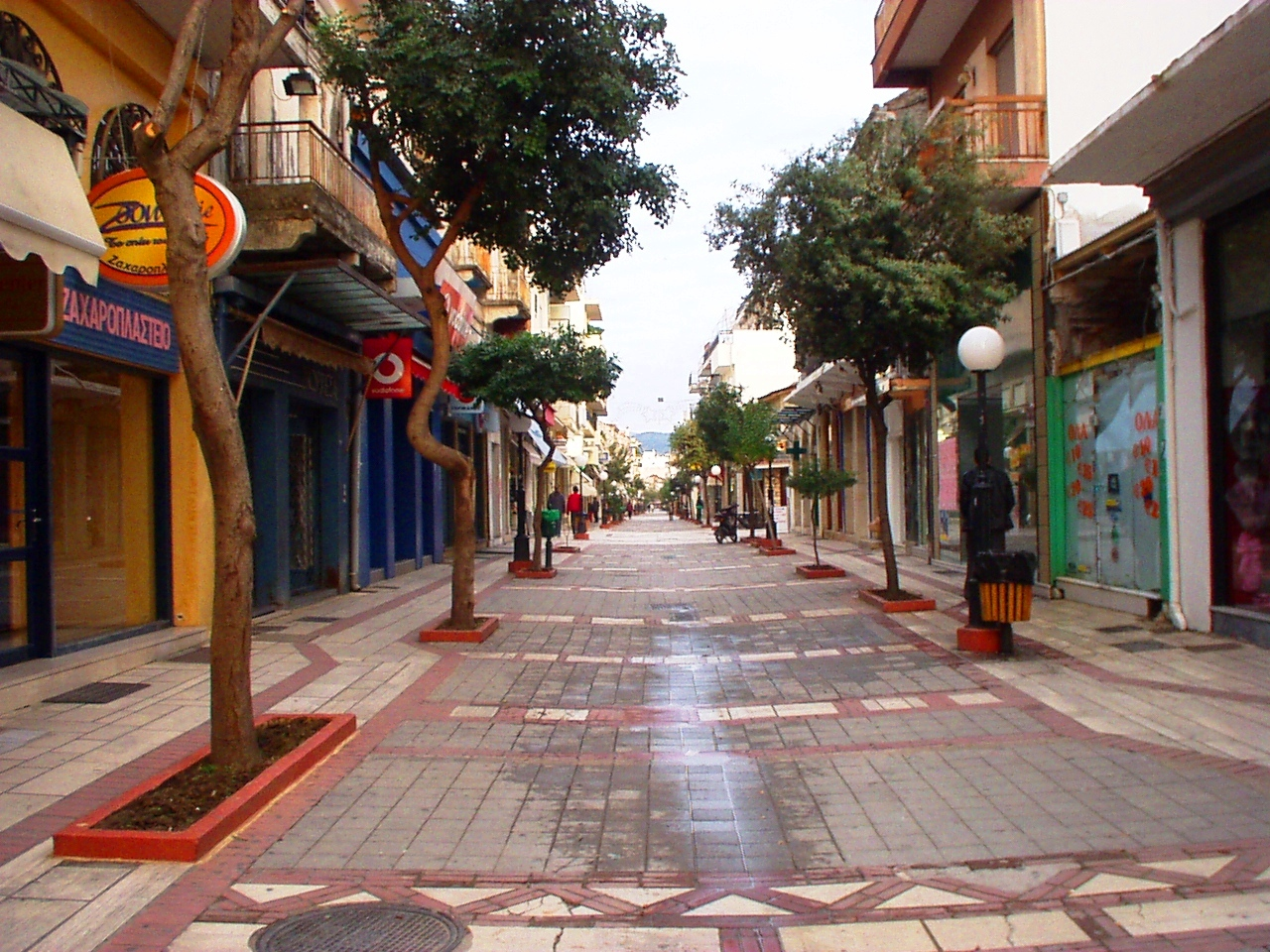
Skoufa Street

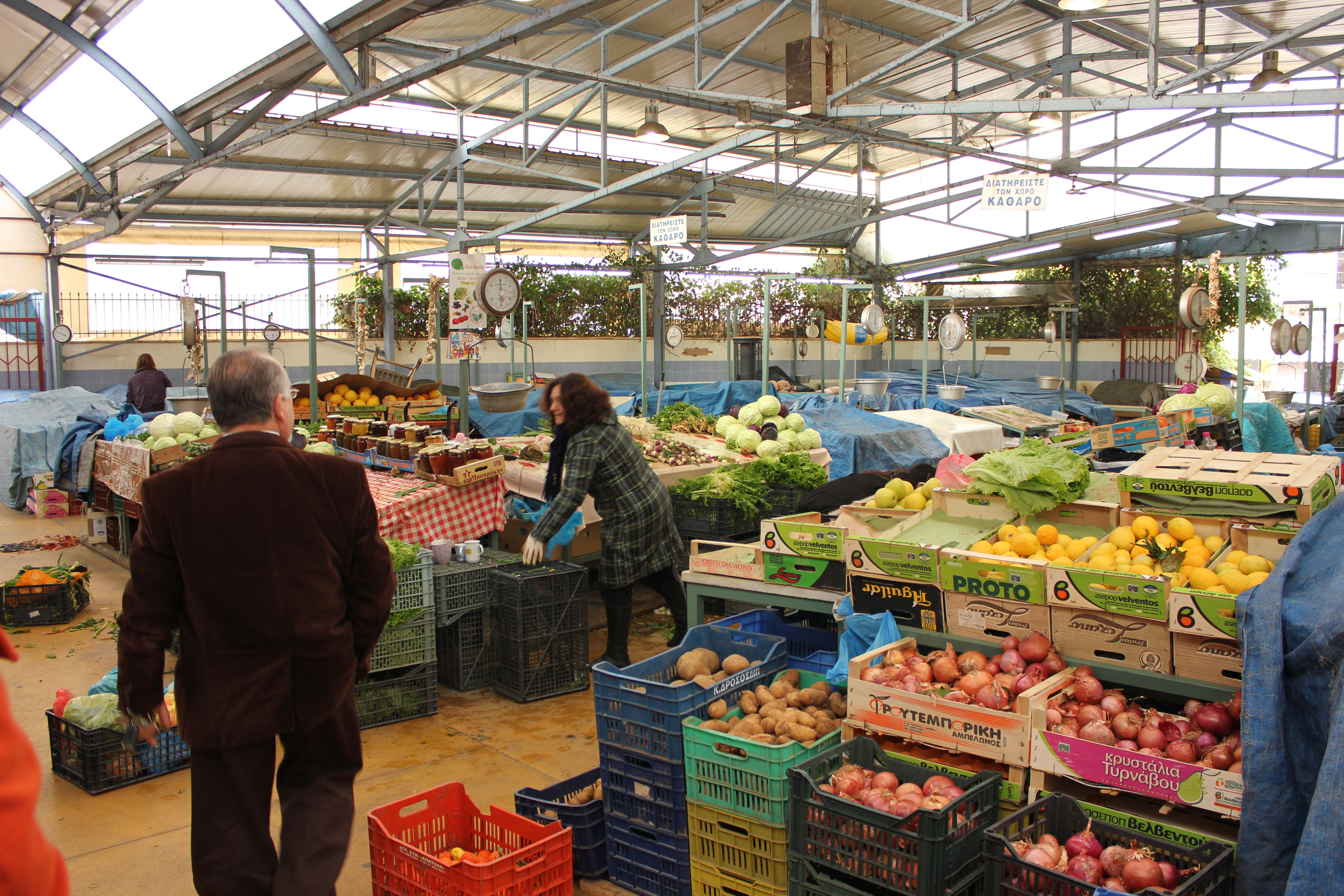
Central street market

The present municipality Arta was formed at the 2011 local government reform by the merger of the following 5 former municipalities, that became municipal units (constituent communities in brackets):

- Amvrakikos (Aneza, Vigla, Gavria, Kalogeriko, Koronisia, Polydroso, Rachi, Strongyli, Psathotopi)
- Arta (Arta, Keramates, Kostakioi, Limini)
- Filothei (Agios Spyridon, Kalamia, Kalovatos, Kirkizates, Rokka, Chalkiades)
- Vlacherna (Vlacherna, Grammenitsa, Grimpovo, Korfovouni)
- Xirovouni (Ammotopos, Dafnoti, Kampi, Pantanassa, Pistiana, Rodavgi, Skoupa, Faneromeni)

The municipality has an area of 457.248 km^{2}, the municipal unit 47.493 km^{2}.

=== Quarters of Arta ===
- Agia Triada
- Agioi Anargyroi
- Agios Georgios Glykorrizou
- Eleousa
- Glykorrizo
- Kato Panagia Artas
- Marathovouni

== Historical population ==
Year	Municipal unit	Municipality
1981	20,004	-
1991	23,710	-
2001	23,863	-
2011	27,330	43,166
2021	26,999	41,600

== Notable people ==
=== Ancient ===
- Pyrrhus (318–272 BC), general and king of Epirus
- Epicrates of Ambracia (4th century BC), comic poet
- Silanus of Ambracia (5th century BC), soothsayer in Xenophon's Anabasis
- Epigonus of Ambracia (6th–5th BC), musician

=== Byzantine ===
- Michael I Komnenos Doukas, founder and first ruler of the principality of Epirus from 1205 until his death in 1215.
- Theodore Komnenos Doukas, (died c. 1253), ruler of Epirus from 1215 to 1230 and of Thessalonica from 1224 to 1230.
- Theodora Petraliphaina, canonized as Saint Theodora of Arta; (ca. 1225 – after 1270), consort of Epirus and Orthodox Christian saint.
- Michael II Komnenos Doukas, ruler of Epirus from 1230 until his death in 1266/68.
- Nikephoros I Komnenos Doukas, (c. 1240 – c. 1297) ruler of Epirus from 1267/8 to c. 1297.
- Thomas I Komnenos Doukas,(c. 1285–1318) ruler of Epirus from c. 1297 until his death in 1318.

=== Modern ===
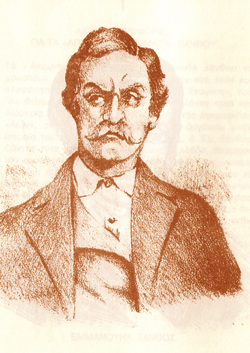
Nikolaos Skoufas

- Maximus the Greek (1475–1556), monk, publicist, writer, scholar, humanist and translator
- Nikolaos Skoufas (1779–1818), founder of the Filiki Eteria, from Kompoti
- Theodoros Tzinis (1798–1869), fighter of the Greek War of Independence, from Kompoti
- Azmi Ömer Akalın, Wāli of Bursa.
- Hoca Ishak Efendi (1774–1835), Ottoman engineer and translator
- Joseph Stephanini (b. 1803) Greek-American author, runaway slave
- Napoleon Zervas (1891–1957), WWII general and resistance leader
- Konstantinos Karapanos (1840–1911), politician and archaeologist
- Alexandros Karapanos (1873–1946), politician and diplomat
- Yiannis Moralis (1916–2009), painter
- Isaac Mizan (1927–2021), last Greek-Jewish survivor of the Auschwitz concentration camp
- Olga Gerovasili, politician
- Antonios Nikopolidis (1971), footballer
- Angeliki Stogia, politician
- Dimitris Tsironis (1960–2022), politician

== Professional sports ==
Handball

- https://web.archive.org/web/20070514042114/http://www.anagenisi-artas.gr/

Basketball

- Pyrros Artas

Football

- https://web.archive.org/web/20190207113340/http://www.anagenisiartas.gr/
- https://web.archive.org/web/20061205033543/http://doxa-artas.gr/

Volleyball

- https://web.archive.org/web/20070516144231/http://www.anagenisi-artas.gr/volley/
- http://www.filia.gr/

== Sources ==
- Fine, John V. A. (1994) [1987]. The Late Medieval Balkans: A Critical Survey from the Late Twelfth Century to the Ottoman Conquest. Ann Arbor, Michigan: University of Michigan Press. ISBN 978-0-472-10079-8.
- Nicol, Donald M. (1984). The Despotate of Epiros, 1267–1479: A Contribution to the History of Greece in the Middle Ages. Cambridge: Cambridge University Press. ISBN 978-0-521-13089-9.
- Soustal, Peter; Koder, Johannes (1981). Tabula Imperii Byzantini, Band 3: Nikopolis und Kephallēnia (in German). Vienna: Verlag der Österreichischen Akademie der Wissenschaften. ISBN 978-3-7001-0399-8.
- Zečević, Nada (2014). The Tocco of the Greek Realm: Nobility, Power and Migration in Latin Greece (14th-15th centuries). Belgrade: Makart. ISBN 9788691944100.
