= List of municipalities of Greece (2011) =

According to the Kallikratis Programme, since 1 January 2011 Greece, with an amendment in 2019, is divided into 332 municipalities, grouped into the 13 regions of Greece.

== List ==
Name	Greek (official name)	Area (km²)	Population (2011)	pop./km²	Seat	Region	Municipal units
Abdera	Άβδηρα (Δήμος Αβδήρων)	352.3	19,005	54	Genissea	Eastern Macedonia and Thrace	Abdera; Selero; Vistonida
Acharnes	Αχαρνές (Δήμος Αχαρνών)	108.0	106,943	990	Acharnes	Attica	Acharnes; Thrakomakedones
Aegina	Αίγινα (Δήμος Αίγινας)	88.8	13,056	147	Aegina	Attica	Aegina
Agathonisi	Αγαθονήσι (Δήμος Αγαθονησίου)	14.4	185	13	Megalo Chorio	South Aegean	Agathonisi
Agia	Αγιά (Δήμος Αγιάς)	663.9	11,470	17	Agia	Thessaly	Agia; Evrymenes; Lakereia; Melivoia
Agia Paraskevi	Αγία Παρασκευή (Δήμος Αγίας Παρασκευής)	8.4	59,704	7,125	Agia Paraskevi	Attica	Agia Paraskevi
Agia Varvara	Αγία Βαρβάρα (Δήμος Αγίας Βαρβάρας)	2.2	26,550	12,224	Agia Varvara	Attica	Agia Varvara
Agioi Anargyroi-Kamatero	Άγιοι Ανάργυροι-Καματερό (Δήμος Αγίων Αναργύρων-Καματερού)	9.5	62,529	6,562	Agioi Anargyroi	Attica	Agioi Anargyroi; Kamatero
Agios Dimitrios	Άγιος Δημήτριος (Δήμος Αγίου Δημητρίου)	5.0	71,294	14,307	Agios Dimitrios	Attica	Agios Dimitrios
Agios Efstratios	Άγιος Ευστράτιος (Δήμος Αγίου Ευστρατίου)	42.1	270	6	Agios Efstratios	North Aegean	Agios Efstratios
Agios Nikolaos	Άγιος Νικόλαος (Δήμος Αγίου Νικολάου)	511.9	27,074	53	Agios Nikolaos	Crete	Agios Nikolaos; Neapoli; Vrachasi
Agios Vasileios	Άγιος Βασίλειος (Δήμος Αγίου Βασιλείου)	358.6	7,427	21	Spili	Crete	Foinikas; Lampi
Agistri	Αγκίστρι (Δήμος Αγκιστρίου)	13.5	1,142	84	Agistri	Attica	Agistri
Agrafa	Άγραφα (Δήμος Αγράφων)	921.1	6,976	8	Kerasochori	Central Greece	Agrafa; Aperantia; Aspropotamos; Fragkista; Viniani
Agrinio	Αγρίνιο (Δήμος Αγρινίου)	1,232.2	94,181	76	Agrinio	West Greece	Agrinio; Angelokastro; Arakynthos; Makryneia; Neapoli; Panaitoliko; Paravola; Parakampylia; Stratos; Thestieis
Aigaleo	Αιγάλεω (Δήμος Αιγάλεω)	6.4	69,946	10,893	Aigaleo	Attica	Aigaleo
Aigialeia	Αιγιάλεια (Δήμος Αιγιαλείας)	725.1	49,872	69	Aigio	West Greece	Akrata; Diakopto; Aigio; Aigeira; Erineos; Sympoliteia
Aktio-Vonitsa	Άκτιο-Βόνιτσα (Δήμος Άκτιου-Βόνιτσας)	659.4	17,370	26	Vonitsa	West Greece	Anaktorio; Medeon; Palairos
Alexandreia	Αλεξάνδρεια (Δήμος Αλεξάνδρειας)	481.6	41,570	86	Alexandreia	Central Macedonia	Alexandreia; Antigonides; Meliki; Platy
Alexandroupoli	Αλεξανδρούπολη (Δήμος Αλεξανδρούπολης)	1,215.5	72,959	60	Alexandroupoli	Eastern Macedonia and Thrace	Alexandroupoli; Feres; Traianoupoli
Aliartos	Αλίαρτος (Δήμος Αλιάρτου)	258.8	10,887	42	Aliartos	Central Greece	Aliartos; Thespies
Alimos	Άλιμος (Δήμος Αλίμου)	6.0	41,720	6,973	Alimos	Attica	Alimos
Almopia	Αλμωπία (Δήμος Αλμωπίας)	988.5	27,556	28	Aridaia	Central Macedonia	Aridaia; Exaplatanos
Almyros	Αλμυρός (Δήμος Αλμυρού)	908.4	18,614	20	Almyros	Thessaly	Almyros; Anavra; Pteleos; Sourpi
Alonnisos	Αλόννησος (Δήμος Αλοννήσου)	129.8	2,750	21	Alonnisos	Thessaly	Alonnisos
Amari	Αμάρι (Δήμος Αμάριου)	278.8	5,915	21	Agia Foteini	Crete	Kourites; Sivritos
Amfikleia-Elateia	Αμφίκλεια-Ελάτεια (Δήμος Αμφίκλειας-Ελάτειας)	533.8	10,922	20	Kato Tithorea	Central Greece	Amfikleia; Elateia; Tithorea
Amfilochia	Αμφιλοχία (Δήμος Αμφιλοχίας)	1,090.9	17,056	16	Amfilochia	West Greece	Amfilochia; Inachos; Menidi
Amorgos	Αμοργός (Δήμος Αμοργού)	129.0	1,973	15	Amorgos	South Aegean	Amorgos
Ampelokipoi-Menemeni	Αμπελόκηποι-Μενεμένη (Δήμος Αμπελοκήπων-Μενεμένης)	10.3	52,127	5,085	Ampelokipoi	Central Macedonia	Ampelokipoi; Menemeni
Amphipolis	Αμφίπολη (Δήμος Αμφίπολης)	411.6	9,182	22	Rodolivos	Central Macedonia	Amphipolis; Kormista; Proti; Rodolivos
Amyntaio	Αμύνταιο (Δήμος Αμυνταίου)	590.2	16,973	29	Amyntaio	Western Macedonia	Aetos; Amyntaio; Filotas; Lechovo; Nymfaio; Variko
Anafi	Ανάφη (Δήμος Ανάφης)	40.6	271	7	Anafi	South Aegean	Anafi
Andravida-Kyllini	Ανδραβίδα-Κυλλήνη (Δήμος Ανδραβίδας – Κυλλήνης)	356.6	21,581	61	Lechaina	West Greece	Andravida; Kastro-Kyllini; Lechaina; Vouprasia
Andritsaina-Krestena	Ανδρίτσαινα-Κρέστενα (Δήμος Ανδριτσαίνας-Κρεστένων)	420.9	14,109	34	Krestena	West Greece	Alifeira; Andritsaina; Skillounta
Andros	Άνδρος (Δήμος Άνδρου)	381.4	9,221	24	Andros	South Aegean	Andros (town); Korthio; Ydrousa
Anogeia	Ανώγεια (Δήμος Ανωγείων)	102.1	2,379	23	Anogeia	Crete	Anogeia
Antiparos	Αντίπαρος (Δήμος Αντιπάρου)	45.4	1,211	27	Antiparos	South Aegean	Antiparos
Apokoronas	Αποκορώνας (Δήμος Αποκορώνου)	315.3	12,807	41	Vryses	Crete	Armenoi; Asi Gonia; Fres; Georgioupoli; Kryonerida; Vamos
Archanes-Asterousia	Αρχάνες-Αστερούσια (Δήμος Αρχανών-Αστερουσίων)	339.1	16,692	49	Peza	Crete	Archanes; Asterousia; Nikos Kazantzakis
Argithea	Αργιθέα (Δήμος Αργιθέας)	373.5	3,450	9	Anthiro	Thessaly	Acheloos; Argithea; Anatoliki Argithea
Argos-Mykines	Άργος-Μυκήνες (Δήμος Άργους-Μυκηνών)	1,001.0	42,022	42	Argos	Peloponnese	Achladokampos; Alea; Argos; Koutsopodi; Lerna; Lyrkeia; Mykines; Nea Kios
Argos Orestiko	Άργος Ορεστικό (Δήμος Άργους Ορεστικού)	342.5	11,802	34	Argos Orestiko	Western Macedonia	Argos Orestiko; Ion Dragoumis
Aristotelis	Αριστοτέλης (Δήμος Αριστοτέλη)	748.2	18,294	24	Ierissos	Central Macedonia	Arnaia; Panagia; Stagira-Akanthos
Arriana	Αρριανά (Δήμος Αρριανών)	773.2	16,577	21	Fillyra	Eastern Macedonia and Thrace	Arriana; Kechros; Organi; Fillyra
Arta	Άρτα (Δήμος Αρταίων)	401.6	43,166	107	Arta	Epirus	Amvrakikos; Arta; Filothei; Vlacherna; Xirovouni
Aspropyrgos	Ασπρόπυργος (Δήμος Ασπροπύργου)	104.8	30,251	289	Aspropyrgos	Attica	Aspropyrgos
Astypalaia	Αστυπάλαια (Δήμος Αστυπαλαίας)	113.4	1,334	12	Astypalaia	South Aegean	Astypalaia
Athens	Αθήνα (Δήμος Αθηναίων)	39.0	664,046	17,036	Athens	Attica	Athens
Central Corfu and Diapontia Islands	Κέρκυρα και Διαπόντιοι Νήσοι (Δήμος Κεντρικής Κέρκυρας και Διαπόντιων Νήσων)	259.5	68,558	264	Corfu (city)	Ionian Islands	Achilleio; Corfu; Ereikoussa; Faiakes; Mathraki; Othonoi; Palaiokastritsa; Parelioi
North Corfu	Βόρεια Κέρκυρα (Δήμος Βόρειας Κέρκυρας)	205.3	17,832	87	Acharavi	Ionian Islands	Agios Georgios, Corfu; Esperies; Thinali; Kasopaia
South Corfu	Νότια Κέρκυρα (Δήμος Νότιας Κέρκυρας)	145.0	15,681	108	Lefkimmi	Ionian Islands	Korission; Lefkimmi; Meliteieon
Central Tzoumerka	Κεντρικά Τζουμέρκα (Δήμος Κεντρικών Τζουμέρκων)	510.4	6,178	12	Vourgareli	Epirus	Agnanta; Athamania; Melissourgoi; Theodoriana
Argostoli	Αργοστόλι (Δήμος Αργοστολίου)	377.0	23,499	62	Argostoli	Ionian Islands	Argostoli; Eleios-Pronnoi; Leivathos; Omala
Lixouri	Ληξούρι (Δήμος Ληξουρίου)	119.6	7,098	59	Lixouri	Ionian Islands	Paliki
Sami	Σάμης (Δήμος Σάμης)	291.2	5,204	18	Sami	Ionian Islands	Erisos; Pylaros; Sami
Chaidari	Χαϊδάρι (Δήμος Χαϊδαρίου)	23.1	46,897	2,026	Chaidari	Attica	Chaidari
Chalandri	Χαλάνδρι (Δήμος Χαλανδρίου)	10.3	74,192	7,229	Chalandri	Attica	Chalandri
Chalcis	Χαλκίδα (Δήμος Χαλκιδέων)	425.0	102,223	241	Chalcis	Central Greece	Anthidona; Avlida; Chalkida; Lilantia; Nea Artaki
Chalki	Χάλκη (Δήμος Χάλκης)	36.9	478	13	Chalki	South Aegean	Chalki
Chalkidona	Χαλκηδόνα (Δήμος Χαλκηδόνος)	390.3	33,673	86	Koufalia	Central Macedonia	Agios Athanasios; Chalkidona; Koufalia
Chania	Χανιά (Δήμος Χανίων)	351.0	108,642	310	Chania	Crete	Akrotiri; Chania; Eleftherios Venizelos; Keramia; Nea Kydonia; Souda; Theriso
Chersonisos	Χερσόνησος (Δήμος Χερσονήσου)	271.6	26,717	98	Gournes	Crete	Chersonisos; Episkopi; Gouves; Malia
Chios	Χίος (Δήμος Χίου)	844.7	51,390	61	Chios (town)	North Aegean	Agios Minas; Amani; Chios (town); Ionia; Kampochora; Kardamyla; Mastichochoria; Omiroupoli
Corinth (municipality)	Κόρινθος (Δήμος Κορινθίων)	612.7	58,192	95	Corinth	Peloponnese	Assos-Lechaio; Corinth; Saronikos; Solygeia; Tenea
Cythera	Κύθηρα (Δήμος Κυθήρων)	298.7	4,041	14	Cythera	Attica	Antikythera; Kythira
Dafni-Ymittos	Δάφνη-Υμηττός (Δήμος Δάφνης-Υμηττού)	2.4	33,628	13,822	Dafni	Attica	Dafni; Ymittos
Delphi	Δελφοί (Δήμος Δελφών)	1,123.2	26,716	24	Amfissa	Central Greece	Amfissa; Delphi; Desfina; Galaxidi; Gravia; Itea; Kallieis; Parnassos
Delta	Δέλτα (Δήμος Δέλτα)	307.9	45,839	149	Sindos	Central Macedonia	Axios; Chalastra; Echedoros
Deskati	Δεσκάτη (Δήμος Δεσκάτης)	433.3	5,853	14	Deskati	Western Macedonia	Chasia; Deskati
Didymoteicho	Διδυμότειχο (Δήμος Διδυμοτείχου)	565.7	19,493	34	Didymoteicho	Eastern Macedonia and Thrace	Didymoteicho; Metaxades
Dion-Olympos	Δίο-Όλυμπος (Δήμος Δίου-Ολύμπου)	494.4	25,668	52	Litochoro	Central Macedonia	Dion; East Olympos; Litochoro
Dionysos	Διόνυσος (Δήμος Διονύσου)	109.1	40,193	369	Agios Stefanos	Attica	Agios Stefanos; Anoixi; Dionysos; Drosia; Kryoneri; Rodopoli; Stamata
Dirfys-Messapia	Δίρφυς-Μεσσαπία (Δήμος Διρφύων-Μεσσαπίων)	773.6	18,800	24	Psachna	Central Greece	Dirfys; Messapia
Distomo-Arachova-Antikyra	Δίστομο-Αράχοβα-Αντικύρα (Δήμος Διστόμου-Αράχοβας-Αντικύρας)	294.3	8,188	28	Distomo	Central Greece	Antikyra; Arachova; Distomo
Dodoni	Δωδώνη (Δήμος Δωδώνης)	659.8	9,693	15	Agia Kyriaki	Epirus	Agios Dimitrios; Dodoni; Selloi; Lakka Souliou
Domokos	Δομοκός (Δήμος Δομοκού)	708.9	11,495	16	Domokos	Central Greece	Domokos; Thessaliotida; Xyniada
Dorida	Δωρίδα (Δήμος Δωρίδος)	1,000.8	13,627	14	Lidoriki	Central Greece	Efpalio; Lidoriki; Tolofon; Vardousia
Doxato	Δοξάτο (Δήμος Δοξάτου)	242.9	14,516	60	Kalampaki	Eastern Macedonia and Thrace	Doxato; Kalampaki
Drama	Δράμα (Δήμος Δράμας)	839.9	58,944	70	Drama	Eastern Macedonia and Thrace	Drama; Sidironero
East Mani	Ανατολική Μάνη (Δήμος Ανατολικής Μάνης)	620.5	13,005	21	Gytheio	Peloponnese	East Mani; Gytheio; Oitylo; Sminos
Edessa	Έδεσσα (Δήμος Έδεσσας)	611.0	28,814	47	Edessa	Central Macedonia	Edessa; Vegoritida
Elafonisos	Ελαφόνησος (Δήμος Ελαφονήσου)	19.9	1,041	52	Elafonisos	Peloponnese	Elafonisos
Elassona	Ελασσόνα (Δήμος Ελασσόνας)	1,568.4	32,121	20	Elassona	Thessaly	Antichasia; Elassona; Karya; Livadi; Olympos; Potamia; Sarantaporo; Tsaritsani; Verdikoussa
Elefsina	Ελευσίνα (Δήμος Ελευσίνας)	35.0	29,902	854	Elefsina	Attica	Elefsina; Magoula
Elliniko-Argyroupoli	Ελληνικό-Αργυρούπολη (Δήμος Ελληνικού-Αργυρούπολης)	15.7	51,356	3,281	Argyroupoli	Attica	Argyroupoli; Elliniko
Emmanouil Pappas	Εμμανουήλ Παππάς (Δήμος Εμμανουήλ Παππά)	337.1	14,664	43	Chryso	Central Macedonia	Emmanouil Pappas; Strymonas
Eordaia	Εορδαία (Δήμος Εορδαίας)	709.1	45,592	64	Ptolemaida	Western Macedonia	Agia Paraskevi; Mouriki; Ptolemaida; Vermio; Vlasti
Epidaurus	Επίδαυρος (Δήμος Επιδαύρου)	341.3	8,115	24	Asklipieio	Peloponnese	Asklipieio; Epidaurus
Eretria	Ερέτρια (Δήμος Ερέτριας)	169.9	13,053	77	Eretria	Central Greece	Amarynthos; Eretria
Ermionida	Ερμιονίδα (Δήμος Ερμιονίδας)	422.6	13,551	32	Kranidi	Peloponnese	Ermioni; Kranidi
Erymanthos	Ερύμανθος (Δήμος Ερυμάνθου)	585.2	8,877	15	Chalandritsa	West Greece	Farres; Kalentzi; Leontio; Tritaia
Evrotas	Ευρώτας (Δήμος Ευρώτα)	865.6	17,891	21	Skala	Peloponnese	Elos; Geronthres; Krokees; Niata; Skala
Faistos	Φαιστός (Δήμος Φαιστού)	409.7	24,466	60	Moires	Crete	Moires; Tympaki; Zaros
Farkadona	Φαρκαδόνα (Δήμος Φαρκαδόνας)	368.8	13,396	36	Farkadona	Thessaly	Farkadona; Oichalia; Pelinnaioi
Farsala	Φάρσαλα (Δήμος Φαρσάλων)	740.2	18,545	25	Farsala	Thessaly	Enippeas; Farsala; Narthaki; Polydamantas
Filiates	Φιλιάτες (Δήμος Φιλιατών)	587.6	7,710	13	Filiates	Epirus	Filiates; Sagiada
Filothei-Psychiko	Φιλοθέη-Ψυχικό (Δήμος Φιλοθέης-Ψυχικού)	6.0	26,968	4,478	Psychiko	Attica	Filothei; Neo Psychiko; Psychiko
Florina	Φλώρινα (Δήμος Φλώρινας)	822.7	32,881	40	Florina	Western Macedonia	Florina; Kato Kleines; Meliti; Perasma
Folegandros	Φολέγανδρος (Δήμος Φολεγάνδρου)	32.5	765	24	Folegandros	South Aegean	Folegandros
Fournoi Korseon	Φούρνοι (Δήμος Φούρνων Κορσεών)	45.9	1,459	32	Fournoi	North Aegean	Fournoi Korseon
Fyli	Φυλή (Δήμος Φυλής)	104.6	45,965	439	Ano Liosia	Attica	Ano Liosia; Fyli; Zefyri
Galatsi	Γαλάτσι (Δήμος Γαλατσίου)	4.2	59,345	14,208	Galatsi	Attica	Galatsi
Gavdos	Γαύδος (Δήμος Γαύδου)	34.5	152	4	Gavdos	Crete	Gavdos
Georgios Karaiskakis	Γεώργιος Καραϊσκάκης (Δήμος Γεωργίου Καραϊσκάκη)	464.7	5,780	12	Ano Kalentini	Epirus	Georgios Karaiskakis; Irakleia; Tetrafylia
Glyfada	Γλυφάδα (Δήμος Γλυφάδας)	25.6	87,305	3,412	Glyfada	Attica	Glyfada
Gortyna	Γόρτυνα (Δήμος Γόρτυνας)	465.1	15,632	34	Agioi Deka	Crete	Agia Varvara; Gortyna; Kofinas; Rouvas
Gortynia	Γορτυνία (Δήμος Γορτυνίας)	1,051.7	10,109	10	Dimitsana	Peloponnese	Dimitsana; Iraia; Kleitor; Kontovazaina; Lagkadia; Trikolonoi; Tropaia; Vytina
Grevena	Γρεβενά (Δήμος Γρεβενών)	1,862.4	25,905	14	Grevena	Western Macedonia	Kosmas o Aitolos; Avdella; Filippaioi; Gorgiani; Dotsiko; Grevena; Irakleotes; Mesolouri; Perivoli; Samarina; Smixi; Theodoros Ziakas; Ventzio
Heraklion	Ηράκλειο (Δήμος Ηρακλείου)	244.6	173,993	711	Heraklion	Crete	Gorgolainis; Heraklion; Nea Alikarnassos; Paliani; Temenos
Hydra	Ύδρα (Δήμος Ύδρας)	65.5	1,966	30	Hydra	Attica	Hydra
Iasmos	Ίασμος (Δήμος Ιάσμου)	487.2	13,810	28	Iasmos	Eastern Macedonia and Thrace	Amaxades; Iasmos; Sostis
Icaria	Ικαριά (Δήμος Ικαριάς)	254.7	8,423	33	Agios Kirykos	North Aegean	Agios Kirykos; Evdilos; Raches
Ierapetra	Ιεράπετρα (Δήμος Ιεράπετρας)	554.8	27,602	50	Ierapetra	Crete	Ierapetra; Makry Gialos
Igoumenitsa	Ηγουμενίτσα (Δήμος Ηγουμενίτσας)	430.5	25,814	60	Igoumenitsa	Epirus	Igoumenitsa; Margariti; Parapotamos; Perdika; Syvota
Ilida	Ηλίδα (Δήμος Ηλίδας)	401.0	32,219	80	Amaliada	West Greece	Amaliada; Pineia
Ilio	Ίλιο (Νέα Λιόσια) (Δήμος Ιλίου)	8.1	84,793	10,470	Ilio	Attica	Ilio
Ilioupoli	Ηλιούπολη (Δήμος Ηλιουπόλεως)	12.9	78,153	6,072	Ilioupoli	Attica	Ilioupoli
Ioannina	Ιωάννινα (Δήμος Ιωαννιτών)	403.0	112,486	279	Ioannina	Epirus	Anatoli; Bizani; Ioannina; Ioannina Island; Pamvotida; Perama
Ios	Ίος (Δήμος Ιητών)	108.6	2,024	19	Ios	South Aegean	Ios
Irakleia	Ηράκλεια (Δήμος Ηρακλείας)	453.1	21,145	47	Irakleia	Central Macedonia	Irakleia; Skotoussa; Strymoniko
Irakleio	Ηράκλειο (Δήμος Ηρακλείου)	4.7	49,642	10,598	Irakleio	Attica	Irakleio
Istiaia-Aidipsos	Ιστιαία-Αιδηψός (Δήμος Ιστιαίας-Αιδηψού)	508.6	21,083	41	Istiaia	Central Greece	Artemisio; Aidipsos; Istiaia; Lichada; Oreoi
Ithaca	Ιθάκη (Δήμος Ιθάκης)	117.0	3,231	28	Vathy	Ionian Islands	Ithaca
Kaisariani	Καισαριανή (Δήμος Καισαριανής)	7.8	26,458	3,400	Kaisariani	Attica	Kaisariani
Kalamaria	Καλαμαριά (Δήμος Καλαμαριάς)	6.5	91,518	14,039	Kalamaria	Central Macedonia	Kalamaria
Kalamata	Καλαμάτα (Δήμος Καλαμάτας)	441.5	69,849	158	Kalamata	Peloponnese	Arfara; Aris; Kalamata; Thouria
Kalavryta	Καλάβρυτα (Δήμος Καλαβρύτων)	1,058.3	11,045	10	Kalavryta	West Greece	Aroania; Kalavryta; Kleitoria; Paia
Kallithea	Καλλιθέα (Δήμος Καλλιθέας)	4.7	100,641	21,386	Kallithea	Attica	Kallithea
Kalymnos	Κάλυμνος (Δήμος Καλυμνίων)	134.3	16,179	120	Pothia (Kalymnos)	South Aegean	Kalymnos
Kamena Vourla	Καμένα Βούρλα (Δήμος Καμένων Βούρλων)	339.0	12,090	36	Kamena Vourla	Central Greece	Agios Konstantinos; Kamena Vourla; Molos
Kantanos-Selino	Κάνδανος-Σέλινο (Δήμος Καντάνου-Σελίνου)	374.8	5,431	14	Palaiochora	Crete	East Selino; Kandanos; Pelekanos
Karditsa	Καρδίτσα (Δήμος Καρδίτσας)	650.7	56,747	87	Karditsa	Thessaly	Itamos; Kallifono; Kampos; Karditsa; Mitropoli
Karpathos	Κάρπαθος (Δήμος Καρπάθου)	323.8	6,226	19	Karpathos	South Aegean	Karpathos; Olympos
Karpenisi	Καρπενήσι (Δήμος Καρπενησίου)	948.6	13,105	14	Karpenisi	Central Greece	Domnista; Fourna; Karpenisi; Ktimenia; Potamia; Prousos
Karystos	Κάρυστος (Δήμος Καρύστου)	675.3	12,180	18	Karystos	Central Greece	Kafireas; Karystos; Marmari; Styra
Kasos	Κάσος (Δήμος Κάσου)	70.2	1,084	15	Kasos	South Aegean	Kasos
Kassandra	Κασσάνδρα (Δήμος Κασσάνδρας)	336.1	16,672	50	Kassandreia	Central Macedonia	Kassandra; Pallini
Kastellorizo	Μεγίστη (Δήμος Μεγίστης)	11.7	492	42	Kastellorizo	South Aegean	Kastellorizo
Kastoria	Καστοριά (Δήμος Καστοριάς)	763.9	35,874	47	Kastoria	Western Macedonia	Agia Triada; Agioi Anargyroi; Kastoria; Kastraki; Klisoura; Korestia; Makednoi; Mesopotamia; Vitsi
Katerini	Κατερίνη (Δήμος Κατερίνης)	684.0	85,851	126	Katerini	Central Macedonia	Elafina; Katerini; Korinos; Olympiaki Akti; Paralia; Petra; Pierioi
Kato Nevrokopi	Κάτω Νευροκόπι (Δήμος Κάτω Νευροκοπίου)	872.4	7,860	9	Kato Nevrokopi	Eastern Macedonia and Thrace	Kato Nevrokopi
Kavala	Καβάλα (Δήμος Καβάλας)	356.4	70,501	198	Kavala	Eastern Macedonia and Thrace	Filippoi; Kavala
Kea	Κέα (Δήμος Κέας)	148.8	2,455	17	Kea	South Aegean	Kea
Keratsini-Drapetsona	Κερατσίνι-Δραπετσώνα (Δήμος Κερατσινίου-Δραπετσώνας)	9.6	91,045	9,502	Keratsini	Attica	Drapetsona; Keratsini
Kifisia	Κηφισιά (Δήμος Κηφισιάς)	35.5	71,259	2,009	Kifisia	Attica	Ekali; Kifisia; Nea Erythraia
Kileler	Κιλελέρ (Δήμος Κιλελέρ)	976.3	20,854	21	Nikaia	Thessaly	Armenio; Kileler; Krannonas; Nikaia; Platykampos
Kilkis	Κιλκίς (Δήμος Κιλκίς)	1,599.8	51,926	32	Kilkis	Central Macedonia	Cherso; Doirani; Gallikos; Kilkis; Kroussa; Mouries; Pikrolimni
Kimolos	Κίμωλος (Δήμος Κιμώλου)	55.8	910	16	Kimolos	South Aegean	Kimolos
Kissamos	Κίσσαμος (Δήμος Κισσάμου)	341.9	10,790	32	Kissamos	Crete	Innachori; Kissamos; Mythimna
Komotini	Κομοτηνή (Δήμος Κομοτηνής)	646.6	66,919	103	Komotini	Eastern Macedonia and Thrace	Aigeiros; Komotini; Neo Sidirochori
Konitsa	Κόνιτσα (Δήμος Κόνιτσας)	953.6	6,362	7	Konitsa	Epirus	Aetomilitsa; Distrato; Fourka; Konitsa; Mastorochoria
Kordelio-Evosmos	Κορδελιό-Εύοσμος (Δήμος Κορδελιού-Ευόσμου)	13.4	101,753	7,613	Evosmos	Central Macedonia	Eleftherio-Kordelio; Evosmos
Korydallos	Κορυδαλλός (Δήμος Κορυδαλλού)	4.4	63,445	14,306	Korydallos	Attica	Korydallos
Kos	Κως (Δήμος Κω)	288.1	33,388	116	Kos	South Aegean	Dikaios; Irakleides; Kos
Kozani	Κοζάνη (Δήμος Κοζάνης)	1072.8	71,388	67	Kozani	Western Macedonia	Dimitrios Ypsilantis; Aiani; Elimeia; Ellispontos; Kozani
Kropia	Κωρωπί (Δήμος Κρωπίας)	114.3	30,307	265	Koropi	Attica	Kropia
Kymi-Aliveri	Κύμη-Αλιβέρι (Δήμος Κύμης-Αλιβερίου)	804.4	28,437	35	Aliveri	Central Greece	Avlon; Dystos; Konistres; Kymi; Tamyneoi
Kythnos	Κύθνος (Δήμος Κύθνου)	99.9	1,456	15	Kythnos	South Aegean	Kythnos
Lake Plastiras	Λίμνη Πλαστήρα (Δήμος Λίμνης Πλαστήρα)	197.2	4,635	24	Morfovouni	Thessaly	Nevropoli Agrafon; Plastiras
Lamia	Λαμία (Δήμος Λαμιέων)	947.8	75,315	79	Lamia	Central Greece	Gorgopotamos; Lamia; Leianokladi; Pavliani; Ypati
Langadas	Λαγκαδάς (Δήμος Λαγκαδά)	1,221.9	41,103	34	Langadas	Central Macedonia	Assiros; Kallindoia; Koroneia; Lachanas; Langadas; Sochos; Vertiskos
Larissa	Λάρισα (Δήμος Λαρισαίων)	336.4	162,591	483	Larissa	Thessaly	Giannouli; Koilada; Larissa
Lavreotiki	Λαυρεωτική (Δήμος Λαυρεωτικής)	175.4	25,102	143	Laurium	Attica	Agios Konstantinos; Keratea; Lavreotiki
Lefkada	Λευκάδα (Δήμος Λευκάδας)	331.8	22,652	68	Lefkada (city)	Ionian Islands	Apollonioi; Ellomenos; Karya; Sfakiotes; Kalamos; Kastos; Lefkada (city)
Leipsoi	Λειψοί (Δήμος Λειψών)	17.1	790	46	Leipsoi	South Aegean	Leipsoi
Lemnos	Λήμνος (Δήμος Λήμνου)	478.6	16,992	36	Myrina	North Aegean	Atsiki; Moudros; Myrina; Nea Koutali
Leros	Λέρος (Δήμος Λέρου)	75.2	7,917	105	Agia Marina	South Aegean	Leros
Mytilini	Μυτιλήνη (Δήμος Μυτιλήνης)	566.7	57,872	102	Mytilini	North Aegean	Agiasos; Gera; Evergetoulas; Loutropoli Thermis; Plomari
West Lesbos	Δυτική Λέσβος (Δήμος Δυτικής Λέσβου)	1,072.5	28,564	27	Kalloni	North Aegean	Agia Paraskevi; Eresos-Antissa; Kalloni; Mantamados; Mithymna; Petra; Polichnitos
Livadeia	Λιβαδειά (Δήμος Λεβαδέων)	690.0	31,315	45	Livadeia	Central Greece	Chaeronea; Davleia; Koroneia; Kyriaki; Livadeia
Lokroi	Λοκροί (Δήμος Λοκρών)	613.6	19,623	32	Atalanti	Central Greece	Atalanti; Dafnousia; Malesina; Opountioi
Loutraki-Perachora-Agioi Theodoroi	Λουτράκι-Περαχώρα-Άγιοι Θεόδωροι (Δήμος Λουτρακίου−Περαχώρας−Αγίων Θεοδώρων)	296.4	21,221	72	Loutraki	Peloponnese	Agioi Theodoroi; Loutraki-Perachora
Lykovrysi-Pefki	Λυκόβρυση-Πεύκη (Δήμος Λυκόβρυσης-Πεύκης)	4.1	31,153	7,589	Pefki	Attica	Lykovrysi; Pefki
Makrakomi	Μακρακώμη (Δήμος Μακρακώμης)	837.4	16,036	19	Sperchiada	Central Greece	Agios Georgios Tymfristou; Makrakomi; Spercheiada; Tymfristos
Malevizi	Μαλεβίζι (Δήμος Μαλεβιζίου)	292.1	24,864	85	Gazi	Crete	Gazi; Krousonas; Tylissos
Mandra-Eidyllia	Μάνδρα-Ειδυλλία (Δήμος Μάνδρας-Ειδυλλίας)	427.0	17,885	42	Mandra	Attica	Erythres; Oinoi; Mandra; Vilia
Mantoudi-Limni-Agia Anna	Μαντούδι-Λίμνη-Αγία Άννα (Δήμος Μαντουδίου-Λίμνης-Αγίας Άννας)	586.5	12,045	21	Limni	Central Greece	Elymnioi; Kireas; Nileas
Marathon	Μαραθώνα (Δήμος Μαραθώνος)	226.8	33,423	147	Marathon	Attica	Grammatiko; Marathon; Nea Makri; Varnavas
Markopoulo Mesogaias	Μαρκόπουλο Μεσογαίας (Δήμος Μαρκοπούλου Μεσογαίας)	82.0	20,040	244	Markopoulo	Attica	Markopoulo Mesogaias
Maroneia-Sapes	Μαρώνεια-Σάπες (Δήμος Μαρώνειας-Σαπών)	644.0	14,733	23	Sapes	Eastern Macedonia and Thrace	Maroneia; Sapes
Marousi	Αμαρούσιο (Δήμος Αμαρουσίου)	13.4	72,333	5,381	Marousi	Attica	Marousi
Megalopoli	Μεγαλόπολη (Δήμος Μεγαλόπολης)	722.9	10,687	15	Megalopoli	Peloponnese	Falaisia; Gortyna; Megalopoli
Meganisi	Μεγανήσι (Δήμος Μεγανησίου)	23.1	1,041	45	Meganisi	Ionian Islands	Meganisi
Megara	Μέγαρα (Δήμος Μεγαρέων)	330.9	36,924	112	Megara	Attica	Megara; Nea Peramos
Messini	Μεσσήνη (Δήμος Μεσσήνης)	562.9	23,482	42	Messini	Peloponnese	Androusa; Aristomenis; Aipeia; Ithomi; Messini; Petalidi; Trikorfo; Voufrades
Metamorfosi	Μεταμόρφωση (Δήμος Μεταμορφώσεως)	5.3	29,891	5,595	Metamorfosi	Attica	Metamorfosi
Meteora	Μετέωρα (Δήμος Μετεώρων)	1,658.8	21,991	13	Kalambaka	Thessaly	Aspropotamos; Chasia; Kalambaka; Kastania; Kleino; Malakasi; Tymfaia; Vasiliki
Metsovo	Μέτσοβο (Δήμος Μετσόβου)	363.3	6,196	17	Metsovo	Epirus	Egnatia; Metsovo; Milea
Milos	Μήλος (Δήμος Μήλου)	167.6	4,977	30	Milos	South Aegean	Milos
Minoa Pediada	Μινώα Πεδιάδα (Δήμος Μινώα Πεδιάδας)	398.5	17,563	44	Evangelismos	Crete	Arkalochori; Kastelli; Thrapsano
Missolonghi	Μεσολόγγι (Δήμος Ιεράς Πόλης Μεσολογγίου)	638.0	34,416	54	Missolonghi	West Greece	Aitoliko; Oiniades; Missolonghi
Monemvasia	Μονεμβασιά (Δήμος Μονεμβασιάς)	952.2	21,942	23	Molaoi	Peloponnese	Asopos; Molaoi; Monemvasia; Voies; Zarakas
Moschato-Tavros	Μοσχάτο-Ταύρος (Δήμος Μοσχάτου-Ταύρου)	5.0	40,413	8,146	Moschato	Attica	Moschato; Tavros
Mouzaki	Μουζάκι (Δήμος Μουζακίου)	313.3	13,122	42	Mouzaki	Thessaly	Ithomi; Mouzaki; Pamisos
Myki	Μύκη (Δήμος Μύκης)	632.1	15,540	25	Sminthi	Eastern Macedonia and Thrace	Myki; Kotyli; Satres; Thermes
Mykonos	Μύκονος (Δήμος Μυκόνου)	105.8	10,134	96	Mykonos	South Aegean	Mykonos
Mylopotamos	Μυλοπόταμος (Δήμος Μυλοποτάμου)	360.6	14,363	40	Perama	Crete	Geropotamos; Kouloukonas; Zoniana
Nafpaktia	Ναυπακτία (Δήμος Ναυπακτίας)	876.9	27,800	32	Nafpaktos	West Greece	Antirrio; Apodotia; Chalkeia; Nafpaktos; Platanos; Pyllini
Nafplio	Ναύπλιο (Δήμος Ναυπλιέων)	391.3	33,356	85	Nafplio	Peloponnese	Asini; Midea; Nafplio; Nea Tiryntha
Naousa	Νάουσα (Δήμος Νάουσας)	425.6	32,494	76	Naousa	Central Macedonia	Anthemia; Eirinoupoli; Naousa
Naxos and Lesser Cyclades	Νάξος και Μικρές Κυκλάδες (Δήμος Νάξου και Μικρών Κυκλάδων)	498.3	18,904	38	Naxos (city)	South Aegean	Donoussa; Drymalia; Irakleia; Koufonisia; Naxos; Schoinoussa
Nea Filadelfeia-Nea Chalkidona	Νέα Φιλαδέλφεια-Νέα Χαλκηδόνα (Δήμος Νέας Φιλαδελφείας-Νέας Χαλκηδόνος)	3.6	35,556	9,949	Nea Filadelfia	Attica	Nea Chalkidona; Nea Filadelfeia
Nea Ionia	Νέα Ιωνία (Δήμος Νέας Ιωνίας)	4.4	67,134	15,258	Nea Ionia	Attica	Nea Ionia
Neapoli-Sykies	Νεάπολη-Συκιές (Δήμος Νεάπολης-Συκεών)	12.5	84,741	6,783	Sykies	Central Macedonia	Agios Pavlos; Neapoli; Pefka; Sykies
Nea Propontida	Νέα Προποντίδα (Δήμος Νέας Προποντίδας)	372.4	36,500	98	Nea Moudania	Central Macedonia	Kallikrateia; Moudania; Triglia
Nea Smyrni	Νέα Σμύρνης (Δήμος Νέας Σμύρνης)	3.5	73,076	20,861	Nea Smyrni	Attica	Nea Smyrni
Nea Zichni	Νέα Ζίχνη (Δήμος Νέας Ζίχνης)	403.7	12,397	31	Nea Zichni	Central Macedonia	Alistrati; Nea Zichni
Nemea	Νεμέα (Δήμος Νεμέας)	205.2	6,483	32	Nemea	Peloponnese	Nemea
Nestorio	Νεστόριο (Δήμος Νεστορίου)	620.2	2,646	4	Nestorio	Western Macedonia	Akrites; Arrenes; Gramos; Nestorio
Nestos	Νέστος (Δήμος Νέστου)	681.7	22,331	33	Chrysoupoli	Eastern Macedonia and Thrace	Chrysoupoli; Keramoti; Oreino
Nikaia-Agios Ioannis Rentis	Νίκαια-Άγιος Ιωάννης Ρέντης (Δήμος Νίκαιας-Αγίου Ιωάννη Ρέντη)	11.2	105,430	9,417	Nikaia	Attica	Agios Ioannis Rentis; Nikaia
Nikolaos Skoufas	Νικόλαος Σκουφάς (Δήμος Νικολάου Σκουφά)	231.6	12,753	55	Peta	Epirus	Arachthos; Kommeno; Kompoti; Peta
Nisyros	Νίσυρος (Δήμος Νισύρου)	49.8	1,008	20	Mandraki	South Aegean	Nisyros
North Kynouria	Βόρεια Κυνουρία (Δήμος Βόρειας Κυνουρίας)	577.1	10,341	18	Astros	Peloponnese	North Kynouria
North Tzoumerka	Βορεία Τζουμέρκα (Δήμος Βορείων Τζουμέρκων)	357.7	5,714	16	Pramanta	Epirus	Kalarites; Katsanochoria; Matsouki; Pramanta; Sirako; Tzoumerka; Vathypedo
Oichalia	Οιχαλία (Δήμος Οιχαλίας)	416.8	11,228	27	Meligalas	Peloponnese	Andania; Dorio; Eira; Oichalia; Meligalas
Oinousses	Οινούσσες (Δήμος Οινουσσών)	17.8	826	46	Oinousses	North Aegean	Oinousses
Archaia Olympia	Αρχαία Ολυμπία (Δήμος Αρχαίας Ολυμπίας)	543.4	13,409	25	Archaia Olympia	West Greece	Archaia Olympia; Foloi; Lampeia; Lasiona
Oraiokastro	Ωραιόκαστρο (Δήμος Ωραιοκάστρου)	218.3	38,317	176	Oreokastro	Central Macedonia	Kallithea; Mygdonia; Oraiokastro
Orchomenos	Ορχομενός (Δήμος Ορχομενού)	418.3	11,621	28	Orchomenos	Central Greece	Akraifnia; Orchomenos
Orestiada	Ορεστιάδα (Δήμος Ορεστιάδας)	957.3	37,695	39	Orestiada	Eastern Macedonia and Thrace	Kyprinos; Orestiada; Trigono; Vyssa
Oropedio Lasithiou	Οροπέδιο Λασιθίου (Δήμος Οροπεδίου Λασιθίου)	129.8	2,387	18	Tzermiado	Crete	Oropedio Lasithiou
Oropos	Ωρωπός (Δήμος Ωρωπού)	339.6	33,769	99	Oropos	Attica	Afidnes; Avlonas; Kalamos; Kapandriti; Malakasa; Markopoulo Oropou; Oropioi; Polydendri; Sykamino
Paiania	Παιανία (Δήμος Παιανίας)	51.9	26,668	514	Paiania	Attica	Glyka Nera; Paiania
Paionia	Παιονία (Δήμος Παιονίας)	925.0	28,493	31	Polykastro	Central Macedonia	Axioupoli; Evropos; Goumenissa; Livadia; Polykastro
Palaio Faliro	Παλαιό Φάληρο (Δήμος Παλαιού Φαλήρου)	4.8	64,021	13,368	Palaio Faliro	Attica	Palaio Faliro
Palamas	Παλαμάς (Δήμος Παλαμά)	382.3	16,726	44	Palamas	Thessaly	Fyllo; Palamas; Sellana
Pallini	Παλλήνη (Δήμος Παλλήνης)	33.5	54,415	1,625	Gerakas	Attica	Anthousa; Gerakas; Pallini
Pangaio	Παγγαίο (Δήμος Παγγαίου)	698.4	32,085	46	Eleftheroupoli	Eastern Macedonia and Thrace	Eleftheres; Eleftheroupoli; Orfani; Pangaio; Piereis
Papagou-Cholargos	Παπάγου-Χολαργός (Δήμος Παπάγου-Χολαργού)	7.2	44,539	6,228	Cholargos	Attica	Cholargos; Papagou
Paranesti	Παρανέστι (Δήμος Παρανεστίου)	1,028.4	3,901	4	Paranesti	Eastern Macedonia and Thrace	Nikiforos; Paranesti
Parga	Πάργα (Δήμος Πάργας)	275.2	11,866	43	Kanallaki	Epirus	Fanari; Parga
Paros	Πάρος (Δήμος Πάρου)	198.4	13,715	69	Paros	South Aegean	Paros
Patmos	Πάτμος (Δήμος Πάτμου)	45.0	3,047	68	Patmos	South Aegean	Patmos
Patras	Πάτρα (Δήμος Πατρέων)	333.7	213,984	641	Patras	West Greece	Messatida; Paralia; Patras; Rio; Vrachnaiika
Pavlos Melas	Παύλος Μελάς (Δήμος Παύλου Μελά)	24.2	99,245	4,109	Stavroupoli	Central Macedonia	Efkarpia; Polichni; Stavroupoli
Paxi	Παξοί (Δήμος Παξών)	30.1	2,300	76	Gaios	Ionian Islands	Paxi
Pella	Πέλλα (Δήμος Πέλλας)	667.4	63,122	95	Giannitsa	Central Macedonia	Giannitsa; Krya Vrysi; Kyrros; Megas Alexandros; Pella
Penteli	Πεντέλη (Δήμος Πεντέλης)	31.1	34,931	1,125	Melissia	Attica	Melissia; Nea Penteli; Penteli
Perama	Πέραμα (Δήμος Περάματος)	14.9	25,389	1,705	Perama	Attica	Perama
Peristeri	Περιστέρι (Δήμος Περιστερίου)	10.8	139,981	12,942	Peristeri	Attica	Peristeri
Petroupoli	Πετρούπολη (Δήμος Πετρουπόλεως)	7.5	58,979	7,819	Petroupoli	Attica	Petroupoli
Pineios	Πηνειός (Δήμος Πηνειού)	160.9	21,034	131	Gastouni	West Greece	Gastouni; Tragano; Vartholomio
Piraeus	Πειραιάς (Δήμος Πειραιώς)	11.2	163,688	14,624	Piraeus	Attica	Piraeus
Platanias	Πλατανιάς (Δήμος Πλατανιά)	492.3	16,874	34	Gerani	Crete	Kolymvari; Mousouroi; Platanias; Voukolies
Pogoni	Πωγώνι (Δήμος Πωγωνίου)	702.0	8,960	13	Kalpaki	Epirus	Ano Kalamas; Ano Pogoni; Delvinaki; Kalpaki; Lavdani; Pogoniani
Polygyros	Πολύγυρος (Δήμος Πολυγύρου)	947.0	22,048	23	Polygyros	Central Macedonia	Anthemountas; Ormylia; Polygyros; Zervochoria
Poros	Πόρος (Δήμος Πόρου)	49.1	3,993	81	Poros	Attica	Poros
Prespes	Πρέσπες (Δήμος Πρεσπών)	518.7	1,560	3	Laimos	Western Macedonia	Krystallopigi; Prespes
Preveza	Πρέβεζα (Δήμος Πρέβεζας)	378.9	31,733	84	Preveza	Epirus	Louros; Preveza; Zalongo
Prosotsani	Προσοτσάνη (Δήμος Προσοτσάνης)	481.1	13,066	27	Prosotsani	Eastern Macedonia and Thrace	Prosotsani; Sitagroi
Psara	Ψαρά (Δήμος Ψαρών)	44.8	458	10	Psara	North Aegean	Psara
Pydna-Kolindros	Πύδνα-Κολινδρός (Δήμος Πύδνας-Κολινδρού)	346.0	15,179	44	Aiginio	Central Macedonia	Aiginio; Kolindros; Methoni; Pydna
Pylaia-Chortiatis	Πυλαία-Χορτιάτης (Δήμος Πυλαίας-Χορτιάτη)	156.3	70,110	449	Panorama	Central Macedonia	Chortiatis; Panorama; Pylaia
Pyli	Πύλη (Δήμος Πύλης)	750.8	14,343	19	Pyli	Thessaly	Gomfoi; Aithikes; Myrofyllo; Neraida; Pialeia; Pyli; Pindos
Pylos-Nestor	Πύλος-Νέστορας (Δήμος Πύλου-Νέστορος)	555.1	21,077	38	Pylos	Peloponnese	Chiliochoria; Koroni; Methoni; Nestoras; Papaflessas; Pylos
Pyrgos	Πύργος (Δήμος Πύργου)	459.2	47,995	105	Pyrgos	West Greece	Iardanos; Oleni; Pyrgos; Volakas
Rafina-Pikermi	Ραφήνα-Πικέρμι (Δήμος Ραφήνας-Πικερμίου)	38.3	20,266	529	Rafina	Attica	Pikermi; Rafina
Rethymno	Ρέθυμνο (Δήμος Ρεθύμνου)	393.9	55,525	141	Rethymno	Crete	Arkadi; Lappa; Nikiforos Fokas; Rethymno
Rhodes	Ρόδος (Δήμος Ρόδου)	1,408.0	115,490	82	Rhodes	South Aegean	Afantou; Archangelos; Attavyros; Ialysos; Kallithea; Kameiros; Lindos; Petaloudes; Rhodes; South Rhodes
Rigas Feraios	Ρήγας Φεραίος (Δήμος Ρήγα Φεραίου)	550.3	10,922	20	Velestino	Thessaly	Feres; Karla; Keramidi
Salamis Island	Σαλαμίνα (Δήμος Σαλαμίνος)	96.3	39,283	408	Salamina	Attica	Ampelakia; Salamina (city)
East Samos	Ανατολική Σάμος (Δήμος Ανατολικής Σάμου)	292.6	20,513	70	Samos	North Aegean	Pythagoreio; Vathy
West Samos	Δυτική Σάμος (Δήμος Δυτικής Σάμου)	187.5	12,464	66	Karlovasi	North Aegean	Karlovasi; Marathokampos
Samothrace	Σαμoθράκη (Δήμος Σαμοθράκης)	180.5	2,859	16	Samothrace	Eastern Macedonia and Thrace	Samothrace
Santorini	Θήρα (Δήμος Θήρας)	90.5	15,550	172	Fira	South Aegean	Oia; Santorini
Saronikos	Σαρωνικός (Δήμος Σαρωνικού)	135.7	29,002	214	Kalyvia Thorikou	Attica	Anavyssos; Kalyvia Thorikou; Kouvaras; Palaia Fokaia; Saronida
Serifos	Σέριφος (Δήμος Σερίφου)	76.2	1,420	19	Serifos	South Aegean	Serifos
Serres	Σέρρες (Δήμος Σερρών)	600.4	76,817	128	Serres	Central Macedonia	Ano Vrontou; Kapetan Mitrousi; Lefkonas; Oreini; Serres; Skoutari
Servia	Σέρβια (Δήμος Σερβίων)	600.1	11,382	19	Servia	Western Macedonia	Kamvounia; Livadero; Servia
Velventos	Βελβεντός (Δήμος Βελβεντού)	127.1	3,448	27	Velventos	Western Macedonia	Velventos
Sfakia	Σφακιά (Δήμος Σφακίων)	467.1	1,889	4	Chora Sfakion	Crete	Sfakia
Sifnos	Σίφνος (Δήμος Σίφνου)	78.3	2,625	34	Sifnos	South Aegean	Sifnos
Sikinos	Σίκινος (Δήμος Σικίνου)	43.3	273	6	Sikinos	South Aegean	Sikinos
Sikyona	Σικυώνα (Δήμος Σικυωνίων)	602.1	22,794	38	Kiato	Peloponnese	Feneos; Sikyona; Stymfalia
Sintiki	Σιντική (Δήμος Σιντικής)	1,100.2	22,195	20	Sidirokastro	Central Macedonia	Achladochori; Agkistro; Kerkini; Petritsi; Promachonas; Sidirokastro
Sithonia	Σιθωνία (Δήμος Σιθωνίας)	519.1	12,394	24	Nikiti	Central Macedonia	Sithonia; Toroni
Sitia	Σητεία (Δήμος Σητείας)	631.0	18,318	29	Sitia	Crete	Itanos; Lefki; Sitia
Skiathos	Σκιάθος (Δήμος Σκιάθου)	49.4	6,088	123	Skiathos	Thessaly	Skiathos
Skopelos	Σκόπελος (Δήμος Σκοπέλου)	96.0	4,960	52	Skopelos	Thessaly	Skopelos
Skydra	Σκύδρα (Δήμος Σκύδρας)	240.3	20,188	84	Skydra	Central Macedonia	Meniida; Skydra
Skyros	Σκύρος (Δήμος Σκύρου)	220.5	2,994	14	Skyros	Central Greece	Skyros
Sofades	Σοφάδες (Δήμος Σοφάδων)	720.5	18,864	26	Sofades	Thessaly	Arni; Menelaida; Rentina; Sofades; Tamasio
Soufli	Σουφλί (Δήμος Σουφλίου)	1,327.1	14,941	11	Soufli	Eastern Macedonia and Thrace	Soufli; Orfeas; Tychero
Souli	Σούλι (Δήμος Σουλίου)	502.2	10,063	20	Paramythia	Epirus	Acherontas; Paramythia; Souli
South Kynouria	Νότια Κυνουρία (Δήμος Νότιας Κυνουρίας)	594.5	8,294	14	Leonidio	Peloponnese	Kosmas; Leonidio; Tyros
South Pelion	Νοτιό Πήλιο (Δήμος Νοτίου Πηλίου)	369.5	10,216	28	Argalasti	Thessaly	Afetes; Argalasti; Milies; Sipiada; Trikeri
Sparta	Σπάρτη (Δήμος Σπάρτης)	1,180.7	35,259	30	Sparta	Peloponnese	Faris; Oinountas; Karyes; Mystras; Pellana; Sparta; Therapnes
Spata-Artemida	Σπάτα-Άρτεμη (Δήμος Σπάτων-Αρτέμιδος)	73.6	33,821	460	Spata	Attica	Spata; Artemida
Spetses	Σπέτσες (Δήμος Σπετσών)	25.5	4,027	158	Spetses	Attica	Spetses
Stylida	Στυλίδα (Δήμος Στυλίδος)	461.8	12,750	28	Stylida	Central Greece	Echinaioi; Pelasgia; Stylida
Symi	Σύμη (Δήμος Σύμης)	65.3	2,590	40	Symi	South Aegean	Symi
Syros-Ermoupoli	Σύρος-Ερμούπολη (Δήμος Σύρου-Ερμούπολης)	102.4	21,507	210	Ermoupoli	South Aegean	Ano Syros; Ermoupoli; Poseidonia
Tanagra	Τανάγρα (Δήμος Τανάγρας)	462.5	19,432	42	Schimatari	Central Greece	Dervenochoria; Oinofyta; Schimatari; Tanagra
Tempi	Τέμπη (Δήμος Τεμπών)	576.3	13,712	24	Makrychori	Thessaly	Ambelakia; Gonnoi; Kato Olympos; Makrychori; Nessonas
Thasos	Θάσος (Δήμος Θάσου)	385.1	13,770	36	Thasos (town)	Eastern Macedonia and Thrace	Thasos
Thebes	Θήβα (Δήμος Θηβαίων)	830.3	36,477	44	Thebes	Central Greece	Plataies; Thisvi; Thebes; Vagia
Thermaikos	Θερμαϊκός (Δήμος Θερμαϊκού)	133.8	50,264	376	Peraia	Central Macedonia	Epanomi; Michaniona; Thermaikos
Thermi	Θέρμη (Δήμος Θέρμης)	382.9	53,201	139	Thermi	Central Macedonia	Mikra; Thermi; Vasilika
Thermo	Θέρμο (Δήμος Θέρμου)	334.6	8,242	25	Thermo	West Greece	Thermo
Thessaloniki	Θεσσαλονίκη (Δήμος Θεσσαλονίκης)	19.7	325,182	16,527	Thessaloniki	Central Macedonia	Thessaloniki; Triandria
Tilos	Τήλος (Δήμος Τήλου)	63.4	780	12	Megalo Chorio	South Aegean	Tilos
Tinos	Τήνος (Δήμος Τήνου)	197.0	8,636	44	Tinos	South Aegean	Exomvourgo; Panormos; Tinos (town)
Topeiros	Τόπειρος (Δήμος Τοπείρου)	309.7	11,544	37	Evlalo	Eastern Macedonia and Thrace	Topeiros
Trifylia	Τριφυλλία (Δήμος Τριφυλλίας)	617.6	27,373	44	Kyparissia	Peloponnese	Aetos; Avlonas; Gargalianoi; Filiatra; Kyparissia; Tripyla
Trikala	Τρίκαλα (Δήμος Τρικκαίων)	609.4	81,355	133	Trikala	Thessaly	Estiaiotida; Faloreia; Kallidendro; Koziakas; Megala Kalyvia; Paliokastro; Paralithaioi; Trikala
Tripoli	Τρίπολη (Δήμος Τρίπολης)	1,474.2	47,254	32	Tripoli	Peloponnese	Falanthos; Korythio; Levidi; Mantineia; Skyritida; Tegea; Tripoli; Valtetsi
Troizinia-Methana	Τροιζηνία-Μέθανα (Δήμος Τροιζηνίας-Μεθάνων)	241.1	7,143	30	Galatas	Attica	Methana; Troizina
Tyrnavos	Τύρναβος (Δήμος Τυρνάβου)	525.5	25,032	48	Tyrnavos	Thessaly	Ampelonas; Tyrnavos
Vari-Voula-Vouliagmeni	Βάρη-Βούλα-Βουλιαγμένη (Δήμος Βάρης-Βούλας-Βουλιαγμένης)	29.1	48,399	1,664	Voula	Attica	Vari; Voula; Vouliagmeni
Velo-Vocha	Βέλο-Βόχα (Δήμος Βέλου-Βοχας)	165.5	19,027	115	Zevgolateio	Peloponnese	Velo; Vocha
Veria	Βέροια (Δήμος Βέροιας)	795.3	66,547	84	Veria	Central Macedonia	Apostolos Pavlos; Dovras; Makedonida; Vergina; Veroia
Viannos	Βιάννος (Δήμος Βιάννου)	222.4	5,563	25	Ano Viannos	Crete	Viannos
Visaltia	Βισαλτία (Δήμος Βισαλτίας)	657.6	20,030	30	Nigrita	Central Macedonia	Achinos; Nigrita; Tragilos; Visaltia
Voio	Βοΐο (Δήμος Βοΐου)	1,007.7	18,386	18	Siatista	Western Macedonia	Askio; Neapoli; Pentalofos; Siatista; Tsotyli
Volos	Βόλος (Δήμος Βόλου)	385.4	144,449	375	Volos	Thessaly	Agria; Artemida; Aisonia; Iolkos; Makrinitsa; Nea Anchialos; Nea Ionia; Portaria; Volos
Volvi	Βόλβη (Δήμος Βόλβης)	783.1	23,478	30	Stavros	Central Macedonia	Agios Georgios; Apollonia; Arethousa; Egnatia; Madytos; Rentina
Vrilissia	Βριλήσσια (Δήμος Βριλησσίων)	3.5	30,741	8,674	Vrilissia	Attica	Vrilissia
Vyronas	Βύρωνας (Δήμος Βύρωνος)	9.6	61,308	6,356	Vyronas	Attica	Vyronas
West Achaea	Δυτική Αχαΐα (Δήμος Δυτικής Αχαΐας)	572.6	25,916	45	Kato Achaia	West Greece	Dymi; Larissos; Movri; Olenia
West Mani	Δυτική Μάνη (Δήμος Δυτικής Μάνης)	402.5	6,945	17	Kardamyli	Peloponnese	Avia; Lefktro
Xanthi	Ξάνθη (Δήμος Ξάνθης)	501.6	65,133	130	Xanthi	Eastern Macedonia and Thrace	Stavroupoli; Xanthi
Xiromero	Ξηρόμερο (Δήμος Ξηρομέρου)	590.7	11,737	20	Astakos	West Greece	Alyzia; Astakos; Fyteies
Xylokastro-Evrostina	Ξυλόκαστρο-Ευρωστίνα (Δήμος Ξυλοκάστρου-Ευρωστίνης)	413.5	17,365	42	Xylokastro	Peloponnese	Evrostina; Xylokastro
Zacharo	Ζαχάρω (Δήμος Ζαχάρως)	276.7	8,953	32	Zacharo	West Greece	Figaleia; Zacharo
Zagora-Mouresi	Ζαγορά-Μουρέσι (Δήμος Ζαγοράς-Μουρεσίου)	150.7	5,809	39	Zagora	Thessaly	Mouresi; Zagora
Zagori	Ζαγόρι (Δήμος Ζαγορίου)	992.6	3,724	4	Asprangeloi	Epirus	Central Zagori; East Zagori; Papingo; Tymfi; Vovousa
Zakynthos	Ζάκυνθος (Δήμος Ζακύνθου)	407.3	40,759	100	Zakynthos (city)	Ionian Islands	Alykes; Arkadioi; Artemisia; Elatia; Laganas; Zakynthos (city)
Ziros	Ζηρός (Δήμος Ζηρού)	382.7	13,892	36	Filippiada	Epirus	Anogeio; Filippiada; Kranea; Thesprotiko
Zitsa	Ζίτσα (Δήμος Ζίτσας)	568.2	14,766	26	Eleousa	Epirus	Ekali; Evrymenes; Molossoi; Pasaronas; Zitsa
Zografou	Ζωγράφου (Δήμος Ζωγράφου)	8.6	71,026	8,257	Zografou	Attica	Zografou
