= List of settlements in the Trikala regional unit =

This is a list of settlements in the Trikala regional unit, Greece.

- Achladea
- Achladochori
- Agia Kyriaki
- Agia Paraskevi
- Agiofyllo
- Agios Nikolaos
- Agios Prokopios
- Agios Vissarion
- Agnantia
- Agrelia
- Aidona
- Amaranto
- Ampelochori
- Anthousa
- Ardani
- Armatoliko
- Asprokklisia
- Athamania
- Avra
- Chaliki
- Chrysavgi
- Chrysomilia
- Dendrochori
- Desi
- Dialekto
- Diasello
- Diava
- Dipotamos
- Drosero
- Drosochori
- Elati
- Eleftherochori
- Ellinokastro
- Faneromeni
- Farkadona
- Fiki
- Filyra
- Flampouresi
- Fotada
- Foteino
- Gardiki
- Gavros
- Genesi
- Georganades
- Gerakari
- Glinos
- Glykomilia
- Gomfoi
- Gorgogyri
- Grizano
- Kakoplevri
- Kalampaka
- Kalliroi
- Kallithea
- Kalogiroi
- Kalogriani
- Kalomoira
- Kastania
- Kastraki
- Katafyto
- Kato Elati
- Kefalovryso
- Keramidi
- Kleino
- Klokotos
- Koniskos
- Korydallos
- Koryfi
- Kotroni
- Koumaria
- Krania
- Krini
- Krinitsa
- Krya Vrysi
- Liopraso
- Livadochori
- Longa
- Longos
- Lygaria
- Malakasi
- Matoneri
- Mavreli
- Mega Kefalovryso
- Megala Kalyvia
- Megali Kerasea
- Megalochori
- Megarchi
- Mesochora
- Moschofyto
- Mouria
- Myrofyllo
- Nea Pefki
- Neraida
- Neraidochori
- Nomi
- Oichalia
- Orthovouni
- Oxyneia
- Pachtouri
- Palaiochori
- Palaiokarya
- Palaiomonastiri
- Palaiopyrgos
- Panagia
- Panagitsa
- Paramero
- Parapotamos
- Patoulia
- Pefki
- Peristera
- Pertouli
- Petrochori
- Petroporos
- Petroto
- Pialeia
- Pigi
- Pineias
- Platanos
- Polyneri
- Polythea
- Prinos
- Prodromos
- Pyli
- Pyrra
- Raxa, Trikala
- Rizoma
- Ropoto
- Sarakina
- Servota
- Skepari
- Spathades
- Stefani
- Stournaraiika
- Taxiarches
- Theopetra
- Trikala
- Trygona
- Valkano
- Valtino
- Vasiliki
- Vathyrrevma
- Vrontero
- Xyloparoiko
- Zarko
- Zilefti

== See also ==
- List of towns and villages in Greece
