= Stefani, Trikala =

Stefani Στεφάνι
- Community
- Location within Greece
- Coordinates: 39°40.7′N 21°18′E
- Country: Greece
- Administrative region: Thessaly
- Regional unit: Trikala
- Municipality: Meteora
- Municipal unit: Aspropotamos

Area
  - Community: 44.587 km^{2} (17.215 sq mi)
- Highest elevation: 1,420 m (4,660 ft)
- Lowest elevation: 1,350 m (4,430 ft)

Population (2021)
  - Community: 0
  - Density: 0.0/km^{2} (0.0/sq mi)
- Time zone: UTC+2 (EET)
  - Summer (DST): UTC+3 (EEST)
- Postal code: 420 36
- Area code: +30-2432
- Vehicle registration: TK

Stefani (Greek: Στεφάνι, Aromanian: Sklinjasa) is an Aromanian (Vlach) village and a community of the Meteora municipality. Before the 2011 local government reform it was part of the community of Aspropotamos, of which it was a communal district. The 2011 census recorded no permanent residents in the village. The community of Stefani covers an area of 44.587 km^{2}.

== See also ==
- List of settlements in the Trikala regional unit
