= Elati, Trikala =

Elati Ελάτη
- Community
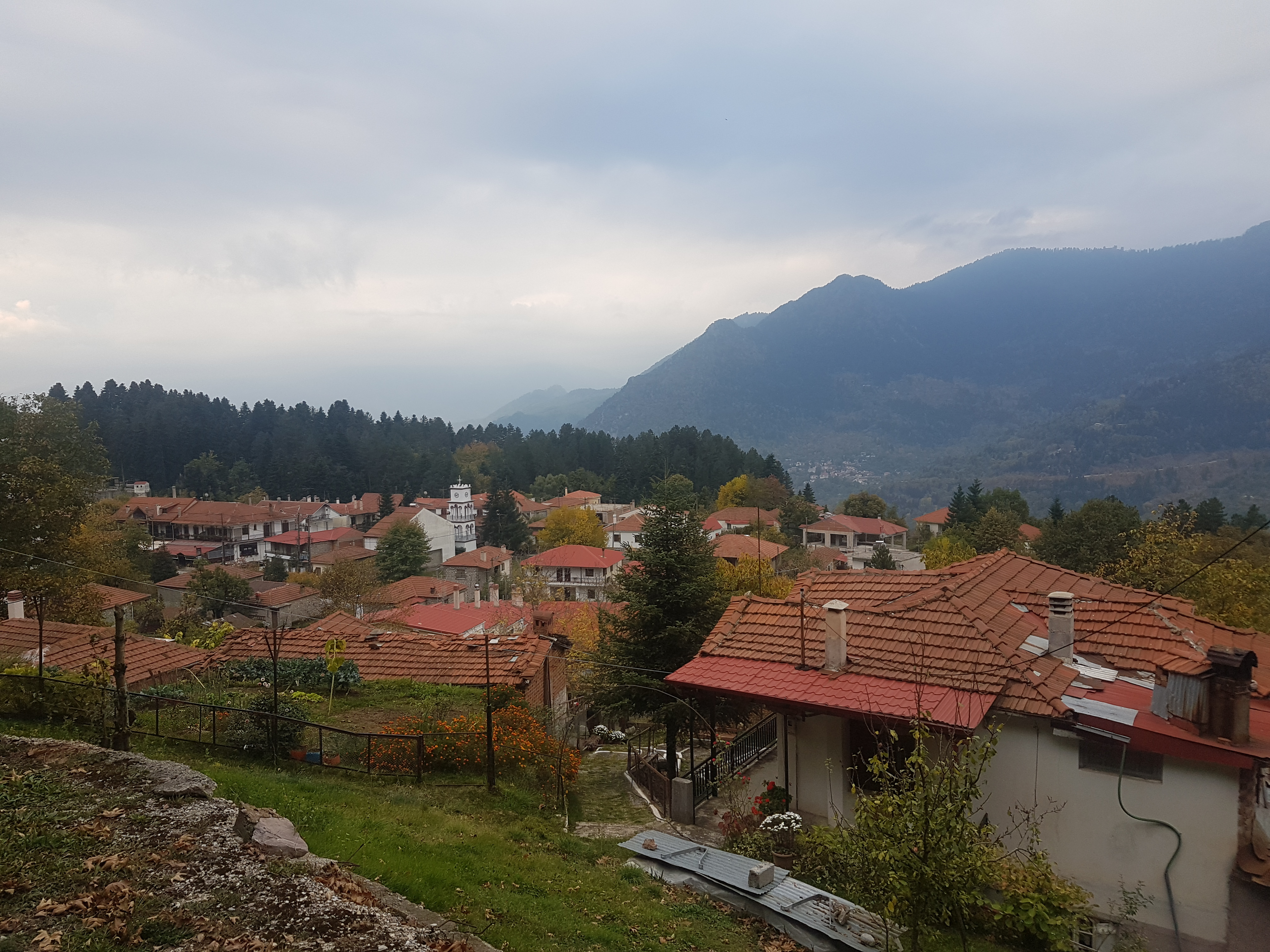

- Location within Greece
- Coordinates: 39°30′08″N 21°32′18″E
- Country: Greece
- Administrative region: Thessaly
- Regional unit: Trikala
- Municipality: Pyli
- Municipal unit: Aithikes

Population (2021)
  - Community: 396
- Time zone: UTC+2 (EET)
  - Summer (DST): UTC+3 (EEST)

Elati (Greek: Ελάτη), formerly known as Tyrna (Τύρνα), is a village in the regional unit of Trikala, Greece. It lies at the south part of the Pindos mountain chain, 32 km (20 mi) from Trikala city.

== History ==
According to tradition, Elati was settled a few years after the Fall of Constantinople to the Ottoman Empire. The present location of the village is fairly new. Before 1943, the village was located more westerly, near the river. In 1943, the village was burned down in by the German Army during the German occupation of Greece. Along the driveway from Trikala to Elati is the Porta Panagia church, built in 1283 in the village of Pyli. The arched bridge over the Portaikos river was built in 1514 by Saint Bessarion II of Larissa.

In the area there are many monasteries. Monasteries still in operation are the Gouras Monastery, and Agiou Vissarionos Monastery, both located near Pyli. The rest of the monasteries are deserted, but they can be located near the villages of Neraidochori, Pyrra, Desi, and Gardiki.

== Tourism ==
Visitors to Elati can enjoy many sporting or other activities. During the winter, a small ski center, located in 7 km outside the village on the way to Pertouli, is operational. There is also a stamina-ski course. During spring and summer, there are many paths for a walking tour in the forest with springs and meadows, and also long roads in the forest to be traveled by car, motorcycle, mountain bicycle even on horseback. At a quarter of an hour from the village on Kokkinos Braxos location, are three climbing stages. Below the highest peak, Koziaka, there is the Xatzipetros's shelter which can provide accommodation for 20 people.

== Wildlife ==
In the area's rivers, there is fishing and swimming in the cold and crystal-clear water. A large variety of wild animals exist in the forest, such as: pheasants, partridges, woodcocks, hares, roes, bears, and wolves. The area's flora varies greatly.
