= Mavreli =

Mavreli Μαυρέλι
- Community
- Location within Greece
- Coordinates: 39°50′N 21°52′E
- Country: Greece
- Administrative region: Thessaly
- Regional unit: Trikala
- Municipality: Meteora
- Municipal unit: Tymfaia

Population (2021)
  - Community: 189
- Time zone: UTC+2 (EET)
  - Summer (DST): UTC+3 (EEST)

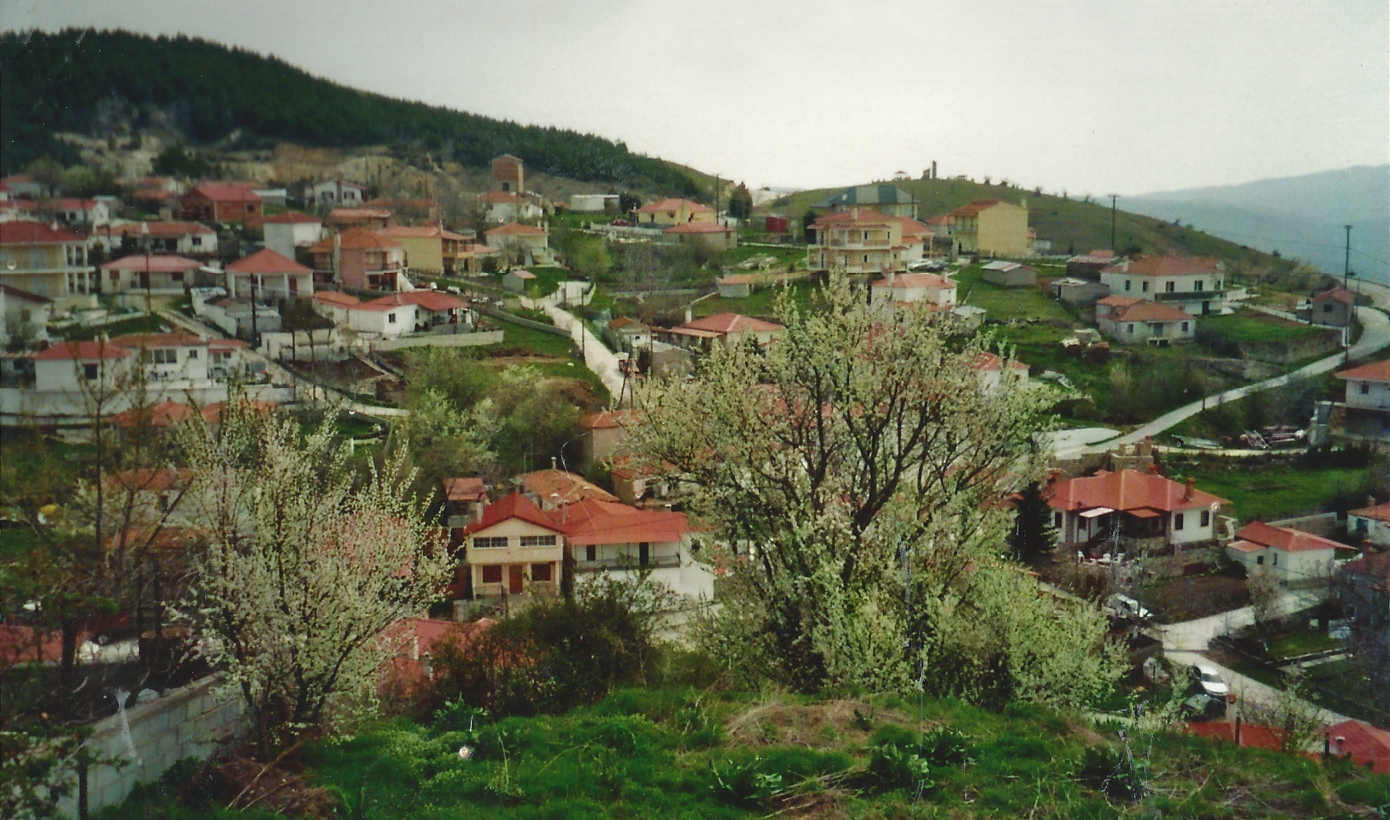

Mavreli is a mountain village in the municipality of Meteora, Trikala regional unit, Greece.
