= Pigi, Trikala =

Pigi Πηγή
- Community
- Location within Greece
- Coordinates: 39°30′43″N 21°42′04″E
- Country: Greece
- Administrative region: Thessaly
- Regional unit: Trikala
- Municipality: Pyli
- Municipal unit: Gomfoi

Population (2021)
  - Community: 986
- Time zone: UTC+2 (EET)
  - Summer (DST): UTC+3 (EEST)

Pigi (Greek: Πηγή) is a large village in the Trikala regional unit, Thessaly, Greece. It is 9 kilometers (ca. 5–6 miles) west from Trikala on the national road of Trikala-Arta. The community had 986 inhabitants at the 2021 census. Most citizens are farmers but there are also some who work for businesses in Trikala. Pigi has its own football stadium but also has an off-road sport terrain. Pigi has also an athletic park called Skamnies.
