= Spathades =

Spathades Σπαθάδες
- Community
- Location within Greece
- Coordinates: 39°42′N 21°43′E
- Country: Greece
- Administrative region: Thessaly
- Regional unit: Trikala
- Municipality: Trikala
- Municipal unit: Paralithaioi

Population (2021)
  - Community: 205
- Time zone: UTC+2 (EET)
  - Summer (DST): UTC+3 (EEST)

Spathades (Greek: Σπαθάδες) is a village and a community in the municipal unit of Paralithaioi in the Trikala regional unit, Greece. It is located 16 km north of the city of Trikala, and 8 km east of Kalabaka. The community includes the small village Agios Nikolaos.

== Population ==
Year	Population
1981	441
1991	339
2001	358
2011	282
2021	205

== See also ==
- List of settlements in the Trikala regional unit
