= Gardiki, Trikala =

Gardiki Γαρδίκι
- Community
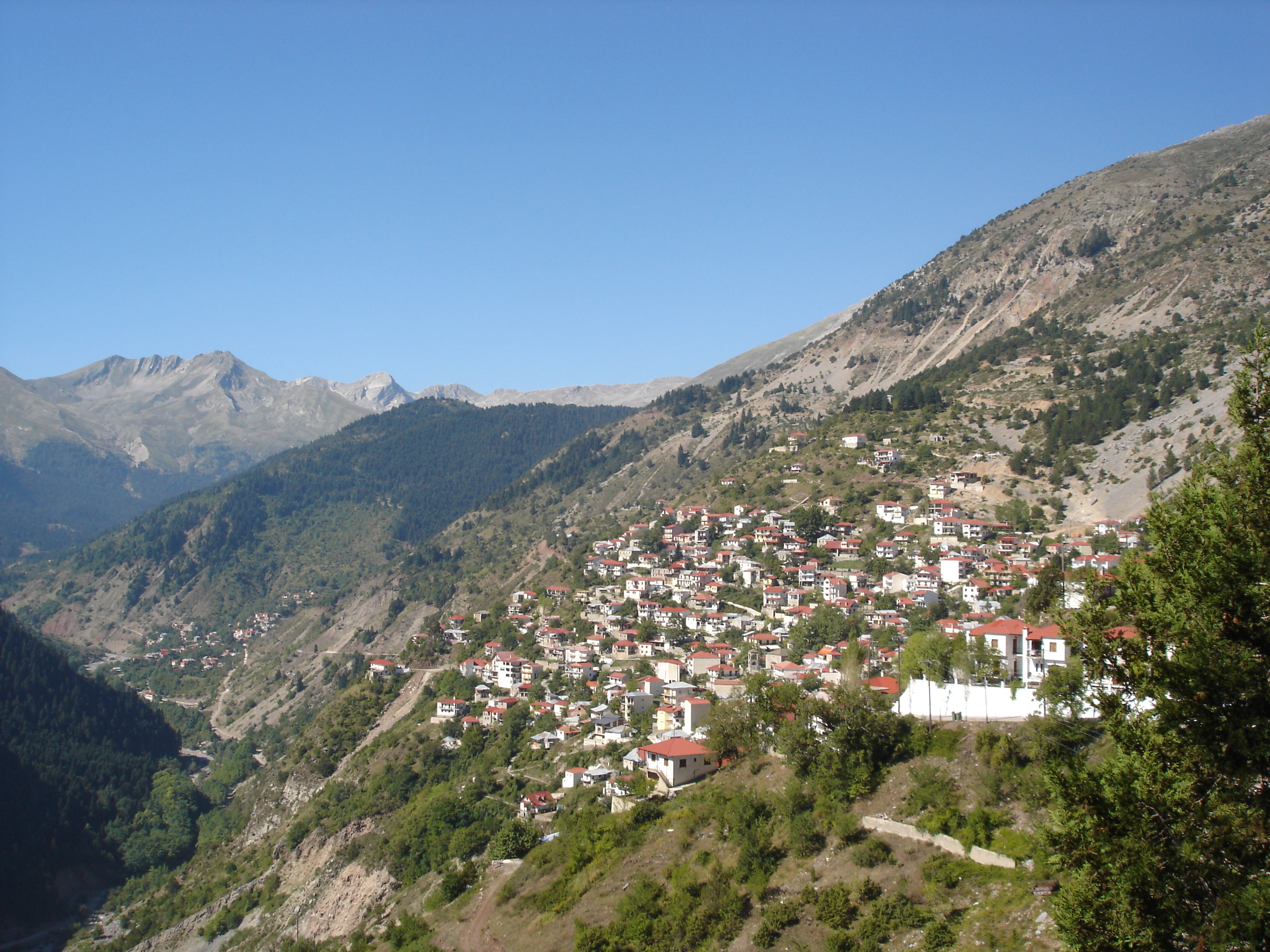
- A view of Gardiki.

- Location within Greece
- Coordinates: 39°32.4′N 21°15.5′E
- Country: Greece
- Administrative region: Thessaly
- Regional unit: Trikala
- Municipality: Pyli
- Municipal unit: Aithikes
- Elevation: 1,050 m (3,440 ft)

Population (2021)
  - Community: 134
- Time zone: UTC+2 (EET)
  - Summer (DST): UTC+3 (EEST)
- Postal code: 420 37
- Area code: +30-2431
- Vehicle registration: ТК

Gardiki (Greek: Γαρδίκη) is a village and a community in the Trikala regional unit of Greece's Thessaly region. It is part of the municipal unit of Aithikes. The 2021 census recorded 134 residents in the community.

== Administrative division ==
The community of Gardiki comprises two settlements:

- Gardiki (population 58, 2011 census)
- Palaiochori (population 85, 2011 census)

== History ==
The village occupies the site of the ancient town of Pellinaeum or Pelinna. The ancient town survived until the early Byzantine period, but disappears thereafter only to reappear under the name of Gardiki in the 11th century. The Byzantine settlement was built on the ruins of the ancient citadel, with the foundations of the ancient wall providing the base of the later medieval fortifications. A ruined three-aisled basilica dedicated to St. Paraskevi from the 14th century also survives.

In the late medieval and Ottoman periods, the area was settled by Aromanian (Vlach) Greeks, who remain the main group of the modern village.

== Episcopal see ==
The town is attested as an episcopal see of the Greek Church since the 11th century as a suffragan see of the Metropolis of Larissa. It was often combined with the nearby see of Peristera (modern Taxiarches).

Manuscript lists give the names of later Greek Orthodox bishops: Metrophanes, degraded in 1623; Gregorius or Cyrillus, 1623; Sophronius, 1646-1649; Gregorius, about 1700; Meletius, 1743; Paisius, 18th century; Gregorius, about 1852. When Thessaly was united with Greece (1881), the Greek Orthodox eparchy had been vacant since 1875 and was suppressed in 1899 through being absorbed into the Metropolis of Phthiotis.

== See also ==
- List of settlements in the Trikala regional unit
