= Pelinnaioi =

Pelinnaioi Πελινναίοι
- Municipal unit
- Location within the regional unit

- Location within Greece
- Coordinates: 39°34′N 21°53′E
- Country: Greece
- Administrative region: Thessaly
- Regional unit: Trikala
- Municipality: Farkadona

Area
  - Municipal unit: 63.3 km^{2} (24.4 sq mi)

Population (2021)
  - Municipal unit: 2,170
  - Municipal unit density: 34.3/km^{2} (88.8/sq mi)
- Time zone: UTC+2 (EET)
  - Summer (DST): UTC+3 (EEST)
- Vehicle registration: ΤΚ

Pelinnaioi (Greek: Πελινναίοι) is a former municipality in the Trikala regional unit, Thessaly, Greece. Since the 2011 local government reform it is part of the municipality Farkadona, of which it is a municipal unit. The municipal unit has an area of 63.270 km^{2}. Population 2,170 (2021). The seat of the municipality was in Taxiarches. The name derived from the inhabitants of the ancient city of Pelinnae, the ruins of which are located nearby.
