= Pindos (municipality) =

Pindos / Dimos Pindeon Δήμος Πινδέων
- Municipal unit
- Location within the regional unit

- Location within Greece
- Coordinates: 39°27′N 21°29′E
- Country: Greece
- Administrative region: Thessaly
- Regional unit: Trikala
- Municipality: Pyli

Area
  - Municipal unit: 166.2 km^{2} (64.2 sq mi)

Population (2021)
  - Municipal unit: 1,015
  - Municipal unit density: 6.107/km^{2} (15.82/sq mi)
- Time zone: UTC+2 (EET)
  - Summer (DST): UTC+3 (EEST)
- Vehicle registration: ΤΚ
- Website: dimospindeon.gr

Pindos (Greek: Δήμος Πινδέων - Dimos Pindeon, before 2001: Δήμος Πυνδαίων - Dimos Pyndaion) is a former municipality in the Trikala regional unit, Thessaly, Greece. Since the 2011 local government reform it is part of the municipality Pyli, of which it is a municipal unit. The municipal unit has an area of 166.219 km^{2}. Population 1,015 (2011). The seat of the municipality was in Stournaraiika. It takes its name from the Pindus mountains.
