= Malakasi =

Malakasi Μαλακάσι
- Municipal unit
- Location within the regional unit

- Location within Greece
- Coordinates: 39°48′N 21°20′E
- Country: Greece
- Administrative region: Thessaly
- Regional unit: Trikala
- Municipality: Meteora

Area
  - Municipal unit: 157.5 km^{2} (60.8 sq mi)

Population (2021)
  - Municipal unit: 612
  - Municipal unit density: 3.89/km^{2} (10.1/sq mi)
  - Community: 134
- Time zone: UTC+2 (EET)
  - Summer (DST): UTC+3 (EEST)
- Vehicle registration: ΤΚ

Malakasi (Greek: Μαλακάσι) is a village and a former municipality in the Trikala regional unit, Thessaly, Greece. Since the 2011 local government reform it is part of the municipality Meteora, of which it is a municipal unit. The municipal unit has an area of 157.534 km^{2}. Population 612 (2021). The seat of the municipality was in Panagia.

== Municipal unit ==
The municipal unit of Malakasi includes the settlements of Korydallos, Malakasi, Panagia, Pefki and Trygona.

== Geography ==
The village is part of the wider Zagori region, between Epirus and Thessaly.

== History ==
The village takes its name from the Malakasii, an Albanian tribe or clan that moved to the area from central Albania in the 14th century. The name most probably refers to the Albanian Malakasii tribe's region of origin in the plain of Mallakastër in southern Albania.

=== Ottoman period ===
During the Ottoman period, Epirus and Aetolia-Acarnania were divided into five armatolikia: Malakasi, Tzoumerka, Xeromero, Lidorikion, and Venetiko.

In May 1871, Malakasi was the seat of the Malakasi nahiye of the Ioannina kaza.

== Demographics ==
The village is inhabited by "Vlachs" (Βλαχι), who are called Malakasi and inhabit the villages from Malakasi to Gardiki.

== Bibliography ==
- Fine, John Van Antwerp (1994), The Late Medieval Balkans: A Critical Survey from the Late Twelfth Century to the Ottoman Conquest, University of Michigan Press, ISBN 978-0-472-08260-5
- Sansaridou-Hendrickx, Thekla (2017). "The Albanians in the Chronicle(s) of Ioannina: An Anthropological Approach". Acta Patristica et Byzantina. 21 (2): 287–306. doi:10.1080/10226486.2010.11879131. S2CID 163742869.
- Valentini, Giuseppe (1956). Il diritto delle comunità nella tradizione giuridica albanese; generalità. Vallecchi.
