= Krinitsa =

Krinitsa Криница
- Selo
- Location within Voronezh Oblast Location within Russia
- Coordinates: 49°42′N 40°36′E
- Country: Russia
- Region: Voronezh Oblast
- District: Bogucharsky District
- Time zone: UTC+3:00

Krinitsa (Russian: Криница) is a rural locality (a selo) in Radchenskoye Rural Settlement, Bogucharsky District, Voronezh Oblast, Russia. The population was 509 as of 2010. There are 9 streets.

== Geography ==
Krinitsa is located 37 km south of Boguchar (the district's administrative centre) by road. Varvarovka is the nearest rural locality.

=== Weather ===
In Krinitsa, the month of August experiences the highest temperatures, with daytime highs reaching up to 92°F (33°C) and nighttime lows of 66°F (19°C). On the other hand, January, the coldest month, sees daytime highs of 37°F (3°C) and nighttime lows of 24°F (-5°C).
