= Kallidendro =

Kallidendro Καλλίδενδρο
- Municipal unit
- Location within the regional unit

- Location within Greece
- Coordinates: 39°33′N 21°40′E
- Country: Greece
- Administrative region: Thessaly
- Regional unit: Trikala
- Municipality: Trikala

Area
  - Municipal unit: 21.8 km^{2} (8.4 sq mi)

Population (2021)
  - Municipal unit: 1,956
  - Municipal unit density: 89.7/km^{2} (232/sq mi)
- Time zone: UTC+2 (EET)
  - Summer (DST): UTC+3 (EEST)
- Vehicle registration: ΤΚ

Kallidendro (Greek: Καλλίδενδρο) is a former municipality in the Trikala regional unit, Thessaly, Greece. Since the 2011 local government reform it is part of the municipality Trikala, of which it is a municipal unit. The municipal unit has an area of 21.833 km^{2}. Population 1,956 (2021). The seat of the municipality was in Valtino. The name of the municipality comes from the greek words καλόν, kalòn + δέντρον, dendron, meaning "nice tree" for the numerous forests of the area.
