= Estiaiotida =

Estiaiotida Εστιαιώτιδα
- Municipal unit
- Location within the regional unit

- Location within Greece
- Coordinates: 39°34′N 21°51′E
- Country: Greece
- Administrative region: Thessaly
- Regional unit: Trikala
- Municipality: Trikala

Area
  - Municipal unit: 39.8 km^{2} (15.4 sq mi)

Population (2021)
  - Municipal unit: 2,452
  - Municipal unit density: 61.6/km^{2} (160/sq mi)
- Time zone: UTC+2 (EET)
  - Summer (DST): UTC+3 (EEST)
- Vehicle registration: ΤΚ

Estiaiotida (Greek: Εστιαιώτιδα) is a former municipality in the Trikala regional unit, Thessaly, Greece. Since the 2011 local government reform, it is part of the municipality Trikala, of which it is a municipal unit. The municipal unit has an area of 39.762 km^{2}. Population 2,452 (2021). The seat of the municipality was in Megalochori. The municipality was named after Histiaeotis, an ancient district of Thessaly region.
