= Aithikes =

Aithikes Αίθηκες
- Municipal unit
- Location within the regional unit

- Location within Greece
- Coordinates: 39°30′N 21°31′E
- Country: Greece
- Administrative region: Thessaly
- Regional unit: Trikala
- Municipality: Pyli

Area
  - Municipal unit: 279.8 km^{2} (108.0 sq mi)

Population (2021)
  - Municipal unit: 1,200
  - Municipal unit density: 4.3/km^{2} (11/sq mi)
- Time zone: UTC+2 (EET)
  - Summer (DST): UTC+3 (EEST)
- Vehicle registration: ΤΚ

Aithikes (Greek: Αίθηκες) is a former municipality in the Trikala regional unit, Thessaly, Greece, named after the ancient city of "Aethikia" and its inhabitants, Aethikes. Since the 2011 local government reform it is part of the municipality Pyli, of which it is a municipal unit. The municipal unit has an area of 279.825 km^{2}. Population 1,200 (2021). The seat of the municipality is in Elati.
