= Vasiliki, Trikala =

Vasiliki Βασιλική
- Municipal unit
- Location within the regional unit

- Location within Greece
- Coordinates: 39°38′N 21°42′E
- Country: Greece
- Administrative region: Thessaly
- Regional unit: Trikala
- Municipality: Meteora

Area
  - Municipal unit: 41.8 km^{2} (16.1 sq mi)

Population (2021)
  - Municipal unit: 1,880
  - Municipal unit density: 45.0/km^{2} (116/sq mi)
  - Community: 1,217
- Time zone: UTC+2 (EET)
  - Summer (DST): UTC+3 (EEST)
- Vehicle registration: ΤΚ

Vasiliki (Greek: Βασιλική, Vasilikí; formerly Voivoda (Βοϊβόδα, Voïvóda) is a village and a former municipality in the Trikala regional unit, Thessaly, Greece. Since the 2011 local government reform it is part of the municipality Meteora, of which it is a municipal unit. The municipal unit has an area of 41.765 km^{2}. Population 1,880 (2021). German-Greek professional footballer, José Lloyd Cholevas has ancestral ties to the village as his father, Achilles Cholevas was born and raised here.
