= Myrofyllo =

Myrofyllo Μυρόφυλλο
- Municipal unit
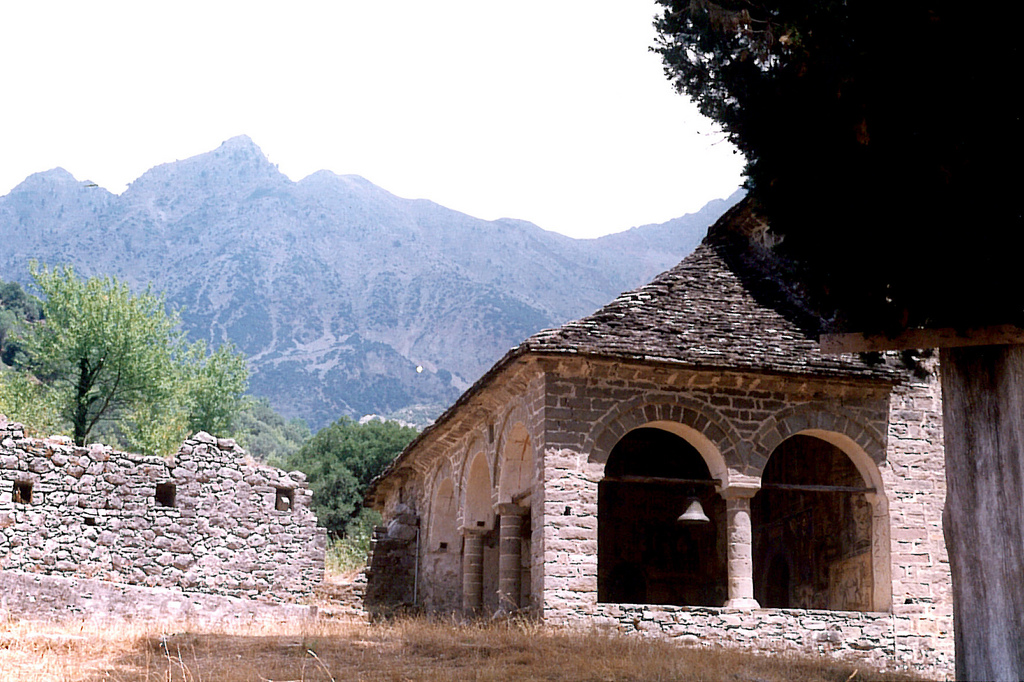
- Old monastery in Myrofyllo

- Location within the regional unit

- Location within Greece
- Coordinates: 39°22′N 21°19′E
- Country: Greece
- Administrative region: Thessaly
- Regional unit: Trikala
- Municipality: Pyli

Area
  - Municipal unit: 32.9 km^{2} (12.7 sq mi)
- Elevation: 773 m (2,536 ft)

Population (2021)
  - Municipal unit: 234
  - Municipal unit density: 7.11/km^{2} (18.4/sq mi)
- Time zone: UTC+2 (EET)
  - Summer (DST): UTC+3 (EEST)
- Vehicle registration: ΤΚ

Myrofyllo (Greek: Μυρόφυλλο) is a village and a former community in the Trikala regional unit, Thessaly, Greece. Since the 2011 local government reform it is part of the municipality Pyli, of which it is a municipal unit. The municipal unit has an area of 32.932 km^{2}. Its permanent population is 234 (2021).
