= Megala Kalyvia =

Megala Kalyvia Μεγάλα Καλύβια
- Municipal unit
- Location within the regional unit

- Location within Greece
- Coordinates: 39°30′N 21°47′E
- Country: Greece
- Administrative region: Thessaly
- Regional unit: Trikala
- Municipality: Trikala

Area
  - Municipal unit: 45.3 km^{2} (17.5 sq mi)

Population (2021)
  - Municipal unit: 2,345
  - Municipal unit density: 51.8/km^{2} (134/sq mi)
  - Community: 1,598
- Time zone: UTC+2 (EET)
  - Summer (DST): UTC+3 (EEST)
- Vehicle registration: ΤΚ

Megala Kalyvia (Greek: Μεγάλα Καλύβια) is a village and a former municipality in the Trikala regional unit, Thessaly, Greece. Since the 2011 local government reform it is part of the municipality Trikala, of which it is a municipal unit. The municipal unit has an area of 45.333 km^{2}. Population 2,345 (2021).
