= Pialeia =

Pialeia Πιάλεια
- Municipal unit
- Location within the regional unit

- Location within Greece
- Coordinates: 39°30′N 21°36′E
- Country: Greece
- Administrative region: Thessaly
- Regional unit: Trikala
- Municipality: Pyli

Area
  - Municipal unit: 52.5 km^{2} (20.3 sq mi)

Population (2021)
  - Municipal unit: 2,897
  - Municipal unit density: 55.2/km^{2} (143/sq mi)
  - Community: 640
- Time zone: UTC+2 (EET)
  - Summer (DST): UTC+3 (EEST)
- Vehicle registration: ΤΚ

Pialeia (Greek: Πιάλεια) is a village and a former municipality in the Trikala regional unit, Thessaly, Greece, named after the ancient city of "Pialeia". Since the 2011 local government reform it is part of the municipality Pyli, of which it is a municipal unit. The municipal unit has an area of 52.517 km^{2}. Population 2,897 (2021). The seat of the municipality was in Fiki.

It used to be a place where only farmers lived. However, nowadays it is considered to be as a place where people who live in Trikala build their houses in order to get away from the city.
