= Neraida, Trikala =

Neraida Νεράιδα
- Municipal unit
- Location within the regional unit

- Location within Greece
- Coordinates: 39°27′N 21°14′E
- Country: Greece
- Administrative region: Thessaly
- Regional unit: Trikala
- Municipality: Pyli

Area
  - Municipal unit: 58.9 km^{2} (22.7 sq mi)
- Elevation: 920 m (3,020 ft)

Population (2021)
  - Municipal unit: 250
  - Municipal unit density: 4.2/km^{2} (11/sq mi)
  - Community: 34
- Time zone: UTC+2 (EET)
  - Summer (DST): UTC+3 (EEST)
- Vehicle registration: ΤΚ

Neraida (Greek: Νεράιδα) is a village and a former community in the Trikala regional unit, Thessaly, Greece. Since the 2011 local government reform it is part of the municipality Pyli, of which it is a municipal unit. The municipal unit has an area of 58.888 km^{2}.
