= Koziakas =

Koziakas Δήμος/Δημοτική Ενότητα Κόζιακα
- Municipal unit
- Location within the regional unit

- Location within Greece
- Coordinates: 39°34′N 21°36′E
- Country: Greece
- Administrative region: Thessaly
- Regional unit: Trikala
- Municipality: Trikala

Area
  - Municipal unit: 59.2 km^{2} (22.9 sq mi)

Population (2021)
  - Municipal unit: 1,894
  - Municipal unit density: 32.0/km^{2} (82.9/sq mi)
- Time zone: UTC+2 (EET)
  - Summer (DST): UTC+3 (EEST)
- Vehicle registration: ΤΚ

Koziakas (Greek: Δήμος/Δημοτική Ενότητα Κόζιακα) is a former municipality in the Trikala regional unit, Thessaly, Greece named after Mount Koziakas or Kerketion (in ancient times). Since the 2011 local government reform it is part of the municipality Trikala, of which it is a municipal unit. The municipal unit has an area of 59.193 km^{2}. Population 1,894 (2021). The seat of the municipality was in Prinos.
