= Kastania, Trikala =

Kastania Καστανιά
- Municipal unit
- Location within the regional unit

- Location within Greece
- Coordinates: 39°43′N 21°23′E
- Country: Greece
- Administrative region: Thessaly
- Regional unit: Trikala
- Municipality: Meteora

Area
  - Municipal unit: 149.8 km^{2} (57.8 sq mi)

Population (2021)
  - Municipal unit: 652
  - Municipal unit density: 4.35/km^{2} (11.3/sq mi)
  - Community: 145
- Time zone: UTC+2 (EET)
  - Summer (DST): UTC+3 (EEST)
- Vehicle registration: ΤΚ

Kastania (Greek: Καστανιά) is a former municipality in the Trikala regional unit, Thessaly, Greece. Since the 2011 local government reform it is part of the municipality Meteora, of which it is a municipal unit. The municipal unit has an area of 149.808 km^{2}. Population 652 (2021).

The village Kastanea is home to Vlachs.
