= Meteora (municipality) =

Meteora Μετέωρα
- Municipality
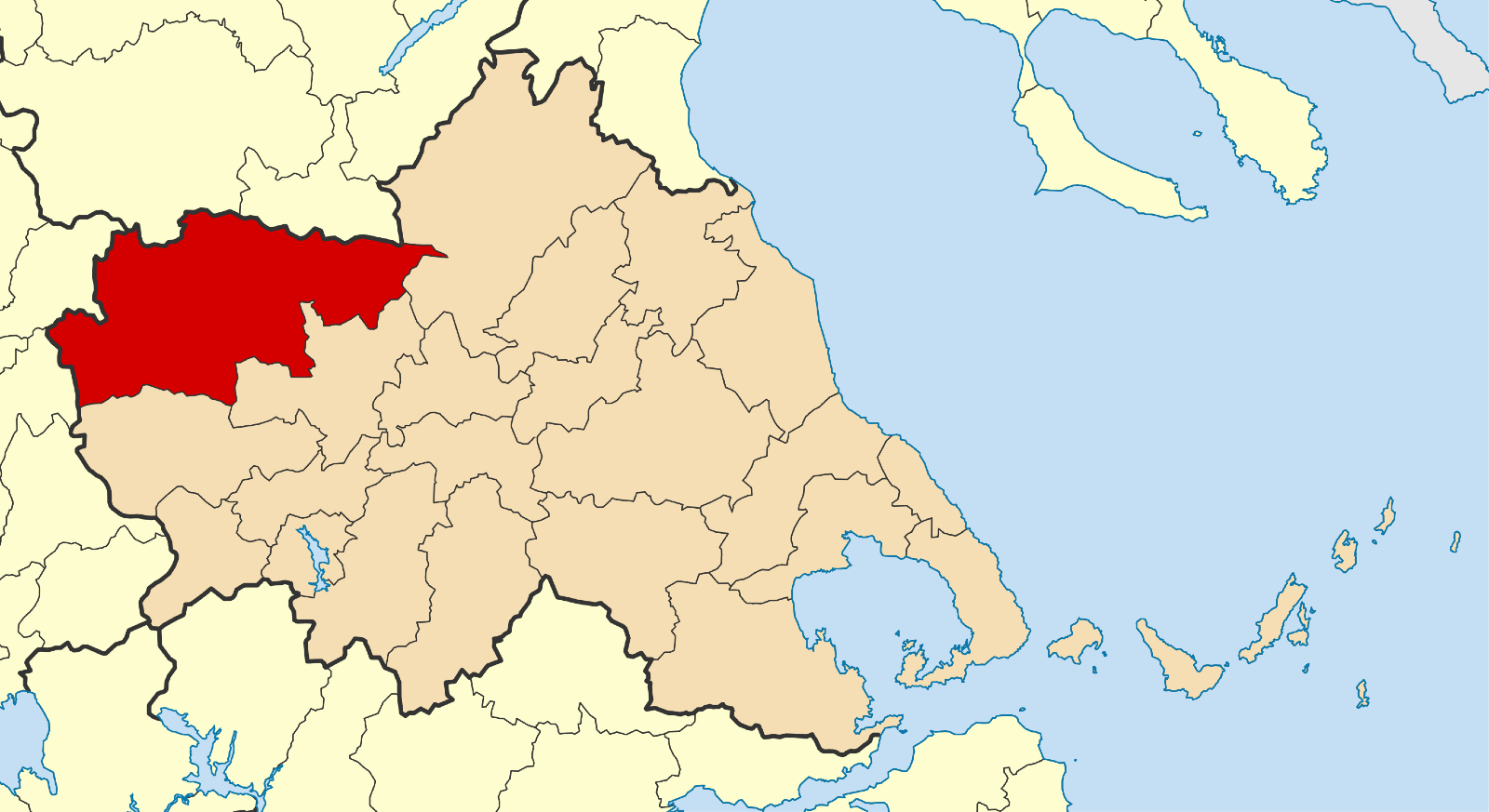

- Location within Greece
- Coordinates: 39°42′N 21°38′E
- Country: Greece
- Administrative region: Thessaly
- Regional unit: Trikala
- Seat: Kalabaka

Area
  - Municipality: 1,658 km^{2} (640 sq mi)

Population (2021)
  - Municipality: 19,274
  - Density: 11.62/km^{2} (30.11/sq mi)
- Time zone: UTC+2 (EET)
  - Summer (DST): UTC+3 (EEST)
- Website: https://www.dimosmeteoron.com/index.php/dimos

Meteora (Greek: Μετέωρα, romanized: Metéora, before 2018: Kalampaka) is a municipality in the regional unit of Trikala in the Thessaly region in Greece. Its seat is the town Kalabaka.

The municipality Meteora was formed as the municipality Kalampaka at the 2011 local government reform by the merger of the following 8 former municipalities, that became municipal units:

- Aspropotamos
- Chasia
- Kalabaka
- Kastania
- Kleino
- Malakasi
- Tymfaia
- Vasiliki

In 2018 it was renamed to "Municipality of Meteora". The municipality has an area of 1,658.280 km^{2}.
