= Pyli =

Pyli Πύλη
- Municipality
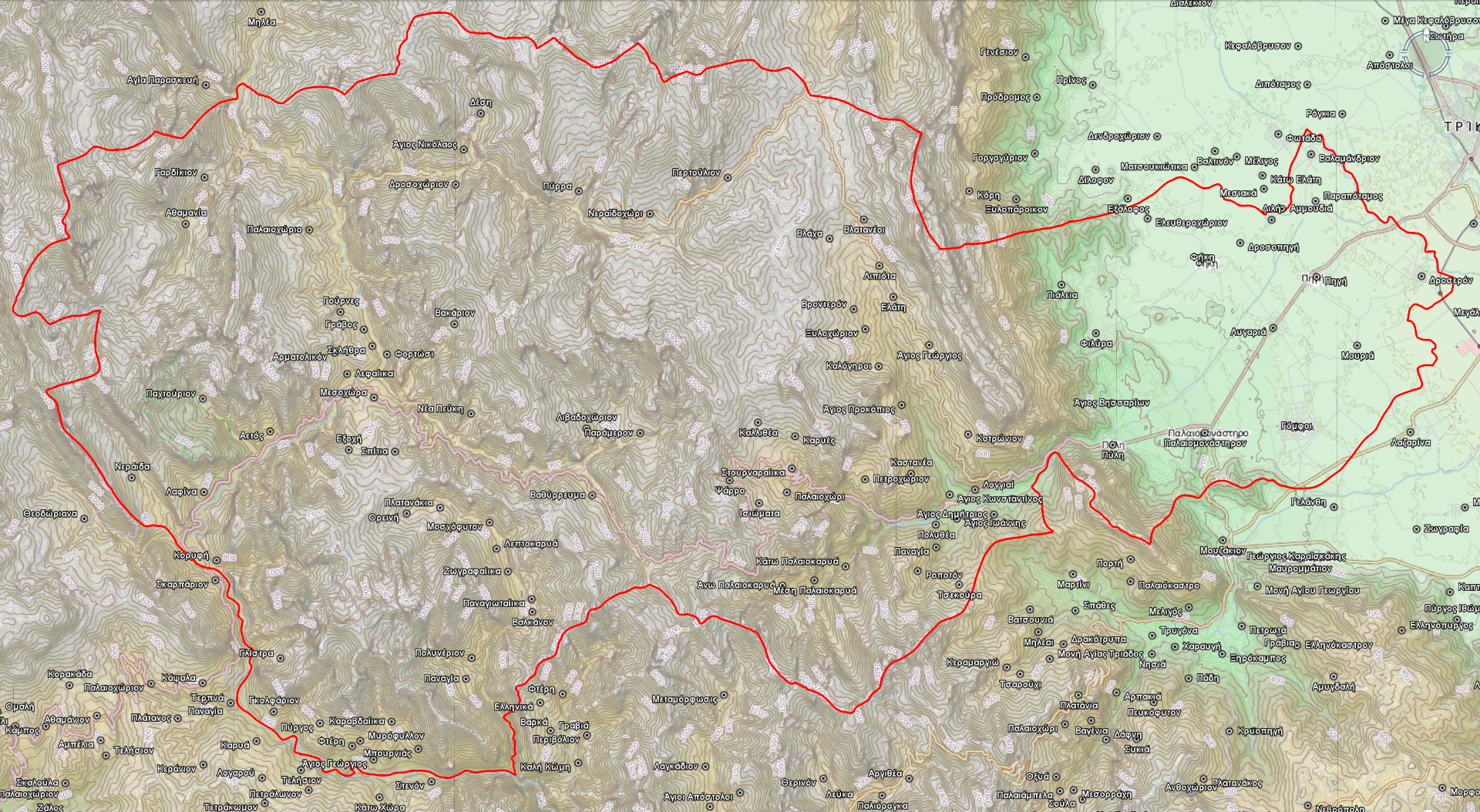
- Pyli municipality

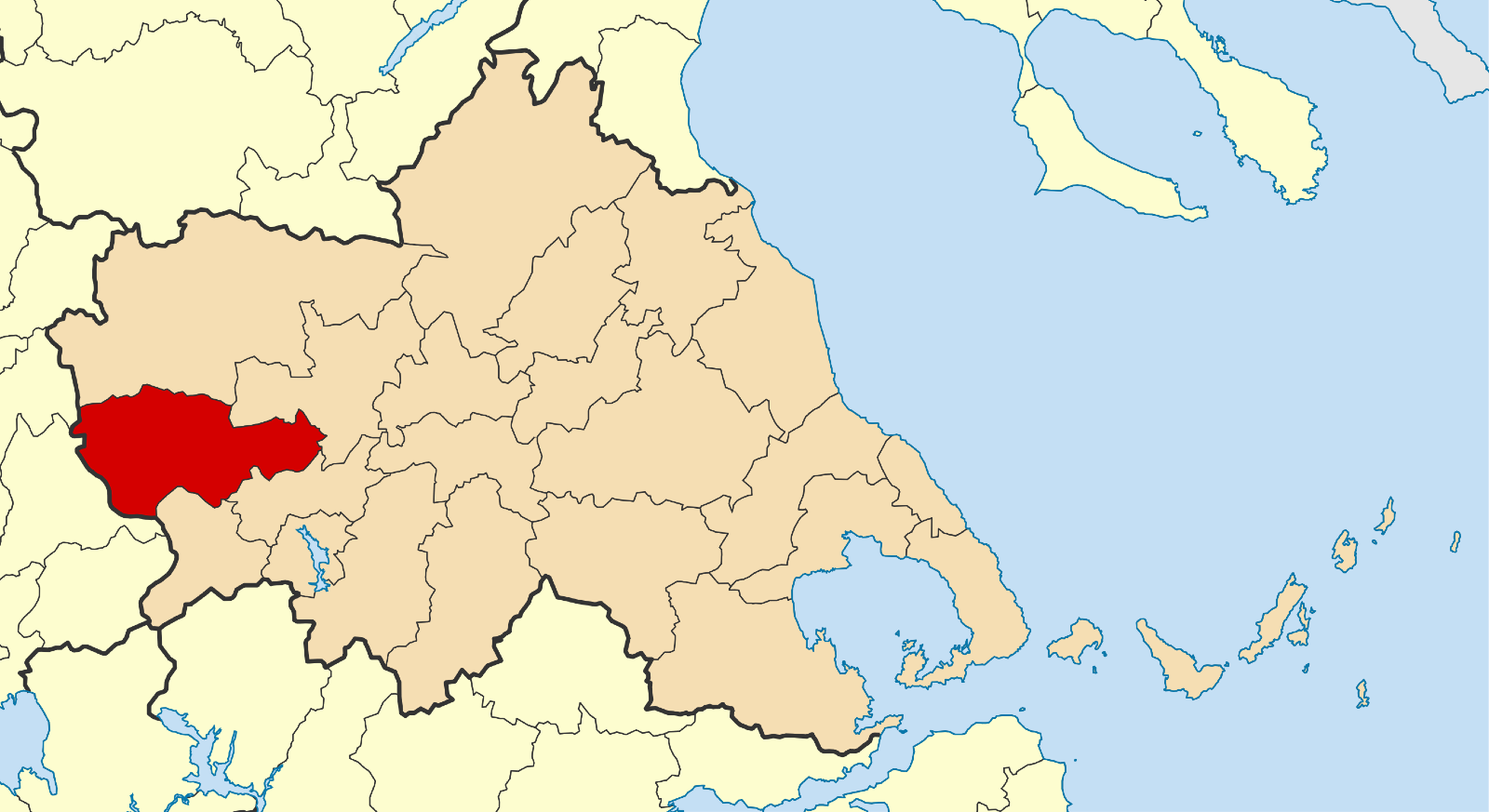

- Location within Greece
- Coordinates: 39°28′N 21°37′E
- Country: Greece
- Administrative region: Thessaly
- Regional unit: Trikala

Government
  - Mayor: Kostas Maravas (since 2019)

Area
  - Municipality: 748.9 km^{2} (289.2 sq mi)
  - Municipal unit: 100.1 km^{2} (38.6 sq mi)

Population (2021)
  - Municipality: 20,000
  - Density: 27/km^{2} (69/sq mi)
  - Municipal unit: 5,000
  - Municipal unit density: 50/km^{2} (130/sq mi)
  - Community: 3,500
- Time zone: UTC+2 (EET)
  - Summer (DST): UTC+3 (EEST)
- Vehicle registration: ΤΚ

Pyli (Greek: Πύλη, romanized: Pýli) is a municipality in the Trikala regional unit, Greece. Situated 18 km west of Trikala, right at the bottom of two mountains Itamos, and Koziakas, which mark the beginning of the Pindos mountainline, Pyli marks the entrance to a great gorge and the natural path that leads to the city of Arta. The river Portaikos, a tributary of the river Pineios, runs through this location. The municipality of Pyli contains 7 municipal units, but the town itself has a population of about 4,000. Most inhabitants are either self-employed in business establishments. Agriculture and animal herding as an occupation has been largely abandoned, though the surrounding area is ideal for both (mountainous and flat terrain). Pyli had always been the major trade center for the surrounding settlements.

== History ==
The settlement of Pyli has been referenced since antiquity. It is first mentioned in the work of Pausanias, Description of Greece (Hellados Periegesis), a travel and cultural guide of ancient Greece, referenced as "Great Gates", because the location is a natural passage between Epirus and Thessaly. There also was a temple devoted to Aphaia Athena in the surrounding area, whose ruins can be still seen. It is also recorded that Alexander the Great passed through Epirus and came to Thessaly through Pyli, in order to ensure Thessaly's support in his plans (which was successful, the cavalry of Thessaly became notorious in Alexander's campaign). It was also later visited by King Philip V of Macedon.

During Greco-Roman times, the location was found to be of strategic importance and the castle of Athinaion was used as an outpost, enabling monitoring of the plains in distances of up to 30 or 40 km (the famous Meteora are visible on a clear day from these outposts). In Byzantine times, after the first fall of Constantinople to the Fourth Crusade in 1204 AD, various independent states emerged, among which the Despotate of Epirus and the principality of Thessaly. In 1283, the ruler of Thessaly, John I Doukas, founded the monastery of Porta Panagia in the area.

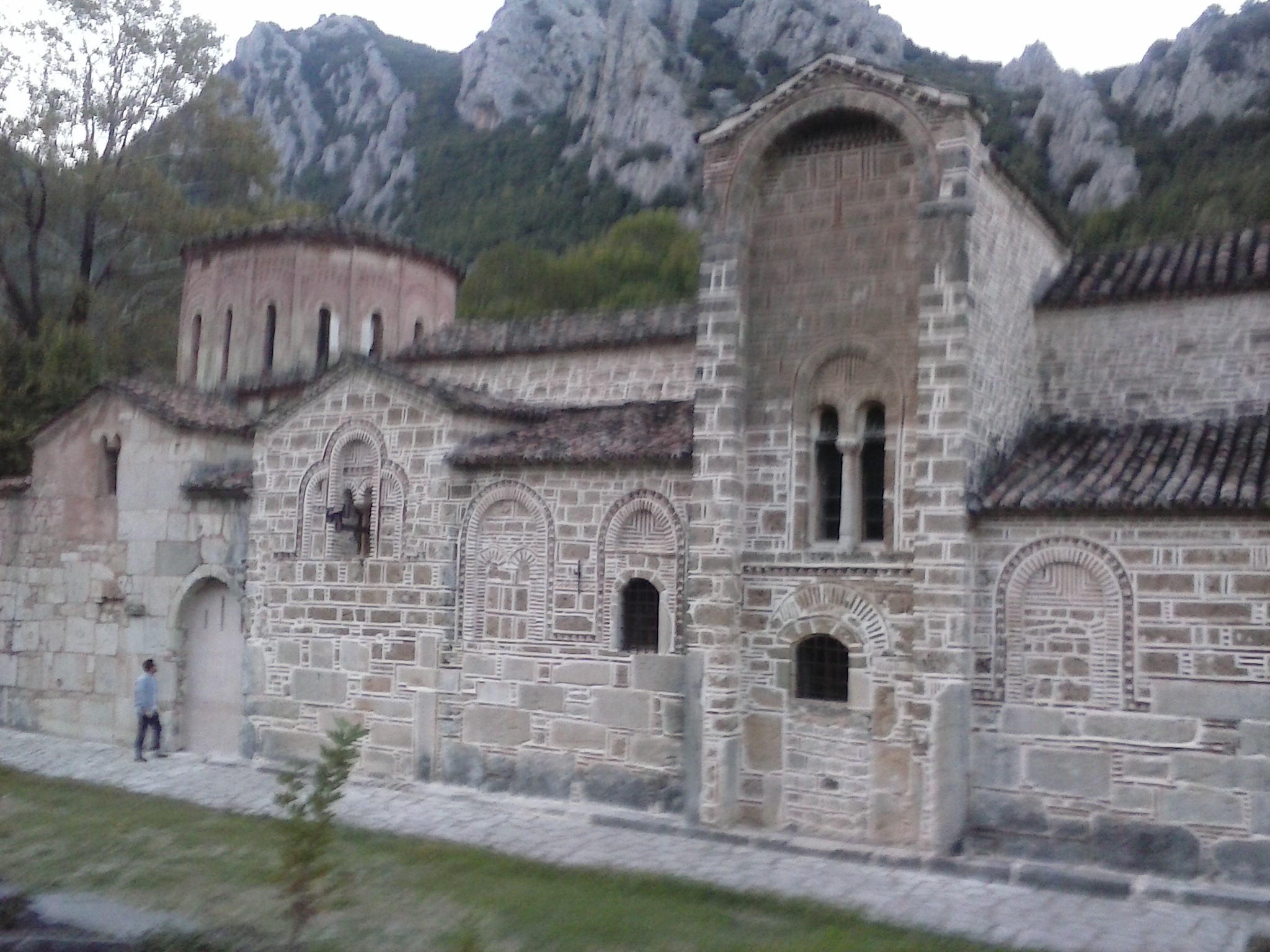
Porta Panagia

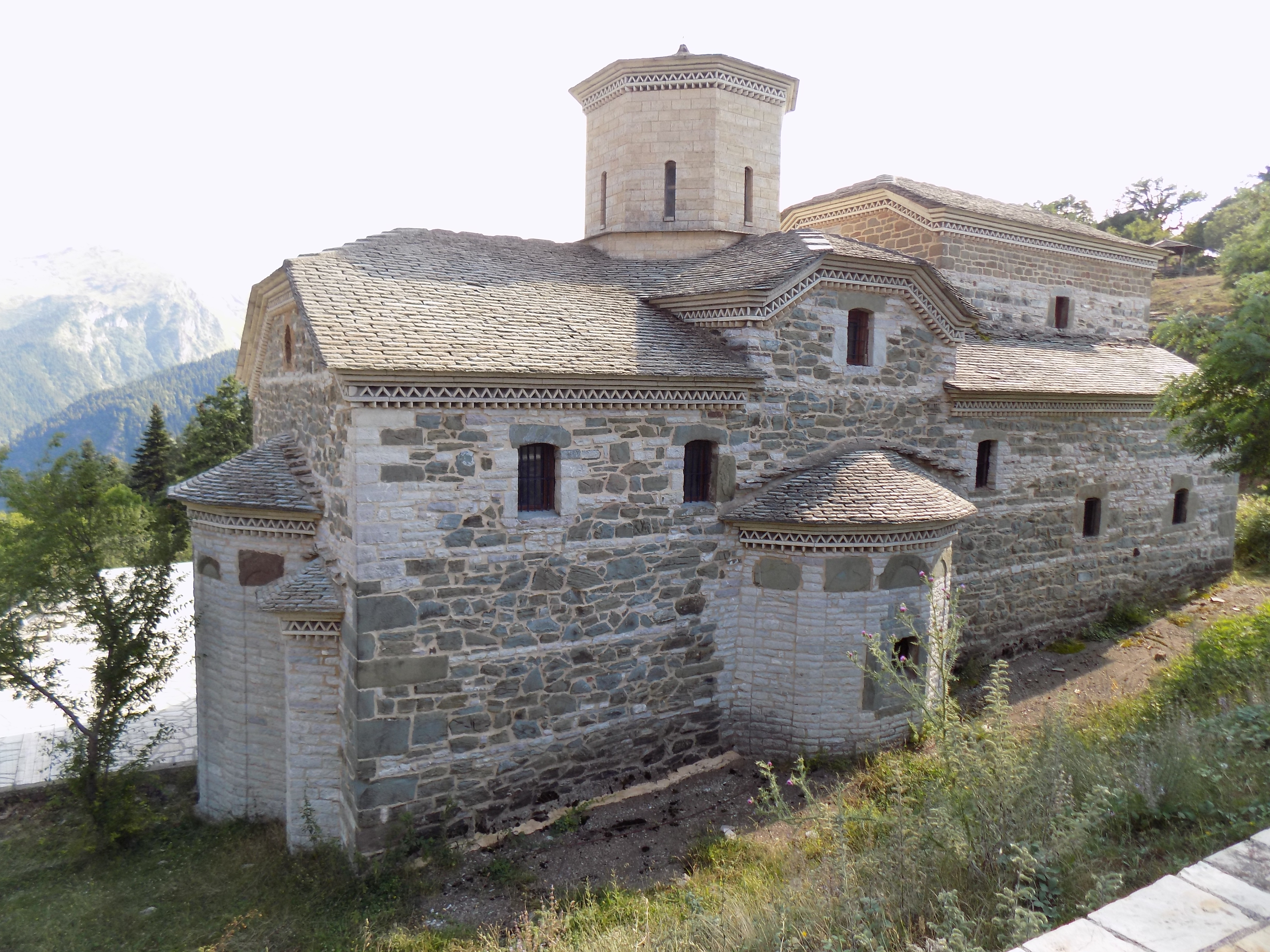
St Paraskevi Monastery

Under the rule of the Ottoman Empire, the town prospered and while it had originally been situated in the north side of the river Portaikos, it is mentioned in the writings of Cosmas of Aetolia that he visited Pyli, and the residents gave no heed to his teachings. It is said that he cursed Pyli and its residents (then known as Porta), and they relocated to the south bank, where Pyli stands today. During the Ottoman era, Ali Pasha of Ioannina rebelled against the Ottoman Empire and tried to turn his domain into an independent state. During his campaign, his army camped briefly at Pyli, and lit a very large and venerable platanus, which was badly burnt, but survived due to its large and strong roots, and still survives to this day. During World War II, the area came under the authority of Italian occupation forces, and was the site of the Battle of Porta between the Greek partisans of ELAS and the Italians in June 1943. In 1943-1944 it was under German occupation. The Germans set fire to the monastery of the Dormition of Theotokos, believing that ELAS forces were in hiding there.

In modern years, Pyli has been the local trading and education center for the surrounding villages and settlements, especially those situated in the mountainous area west of Pyli. Since Thessaly was merged into the Kingdom of Greece in 1888, Pyli was always intensely populated and bristling with activity, being characterized as a 'small town' and electing a mayor of its own. With the Kapodistrias plan in the late 1990s, Pyli officially became a municipality with 6 municipal prefectures under its jurisdiction, St. Vissarion, Ropoto, Palaiokarya, Petrohori, St. Prokopios and Kotroni.

== Municipality ==
The municipality Pyli was formed at the 2011 local government reform by the merger of the following 7 former municipalities, that became municipal units:

- Aithikes
- Gomfoi
- Myrofyllo
- Neraida
- Pialeia
- Pindos
- Pyli

The municipality has an area of 748.938 km^{2}, the municipal unit 100.075 km^{2}. After the 2014 elections, the new mayor is Kostas Maravas

== Monuments ==
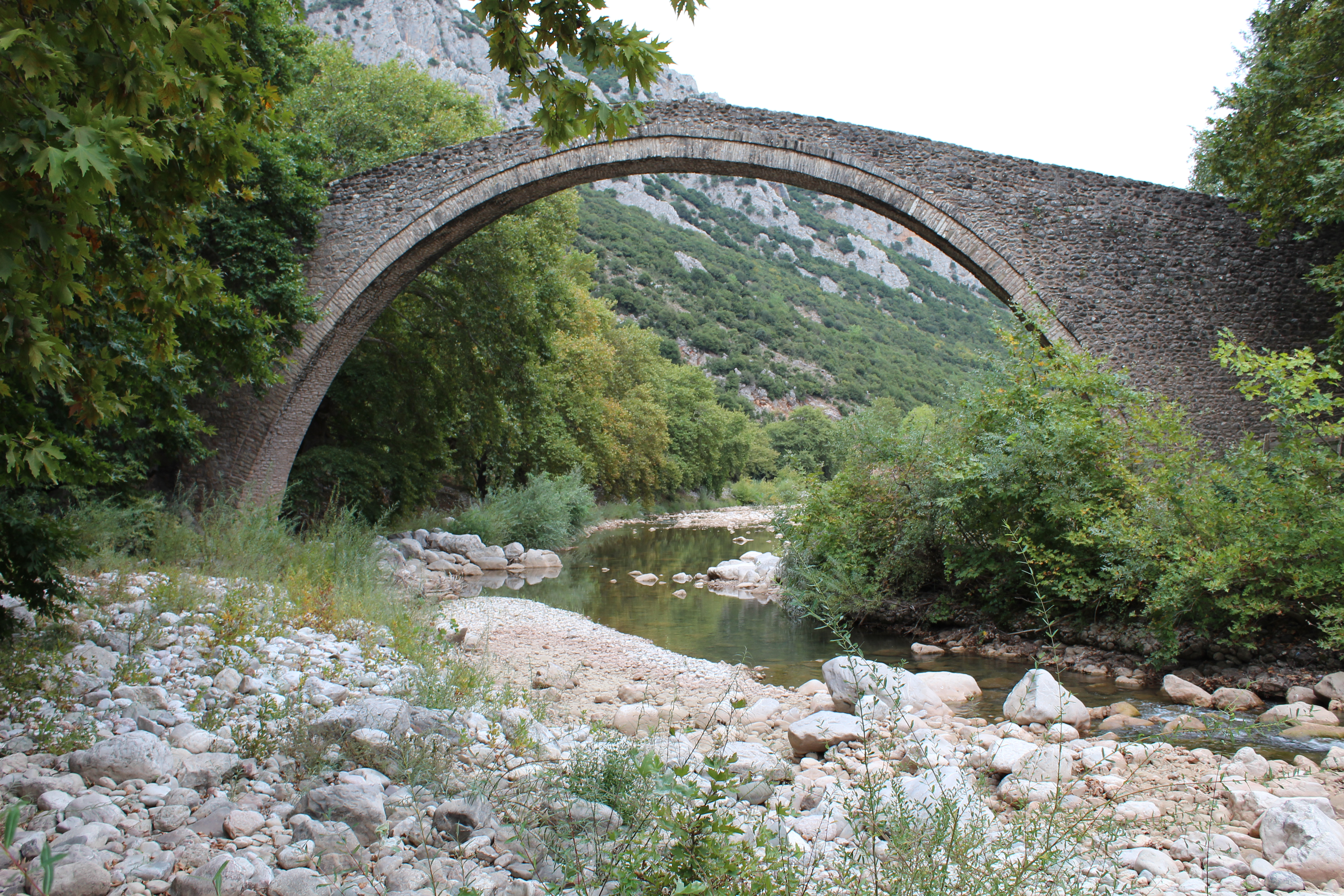
The stone arch Portaikos bridge, built in 1514.

A place of great historic importance due mainly to its strategic location as well its unique landscape, Pyli boasts a large number of monuments, especially considering its size.

- The basilica of Porta Panagia that dates back to 1264, on the north bank of the river Portaikos. The basilica of Porta Panagia was the katholikon of the monastery of the Irresistible Theotokos and is dedicated to the Dormition of the Theotokos. It was built in 1283 by the ruler of Thessaly, John I Doukas. The church is divided into two parts, the main church and the outer section. The main church is a three section cross roofed basilica, while the outer section is a cross shaped escribed dome. There are still pieces of marble decoration and structured that date back to the original ancient temple on top of which the church was built, but most were destroyed in a fire in 1855. The icons are also in need of restoration but they are still visible, though another fire in 1980 nearly destroyed them totally.
- The monastery of St. Vissarion, where women are not allowed to enter and has a total of 365 cells for the monks, situated on Mount Koziakas. The monastery was re-established by St. Vissarion sometime between 1527 and 1535. The church that still stands today was built from scratch in 1557 by the archbishop of Larissa Neophytos II, and the bishops Joseph of Demetrias, Joseph, Luke of Litzas, and Martyrios of Fanari. The church of the monastery is situated at the location the church St. Vissarion built with the help of his brother, Ignatios. The iconography was completed in November 1557 by the painter George from Constantinople. The monastery was one of the richest and most active of the area. It has 366 cells, dining halls, land property in Romania, a rich library with important manuscripts (most of which currently reside in the National Library of Greece). In 1823 the monastery was looted by Suldje Kordja, and in 1943 it was bombed twice, by the Italians and the Germans.
- The Monastery of the Theotokos, situated at Goura on Mount Itamos. Right on top of the town of Pyli at a height of 640m, it is a women's monastery dedicated to the Dormition of the Theotokos. The monastery was founded in 1743 with funds from the archon Dimakis, from the village Chaliki of the area of Aspropotamos. In 1770, during the Orlov Revolt, the monastery was looted by the Turks, in 1823 it was burnt by Suldje Kordja, and in 1854 it was destroyed again. In 1864 it was rebuilt only in order to be set ablaze again on May 11, 1878 by the Turks, because it was used as a rebel stronghold during the brief Greek rebellion in Thessaly that year. It was built anew in 1893 by the newly appointed chief of the monastery, Meletios Karanikas. In 1943 it was bombed and burnt by the Germans and in 1960 its church collapsed. In 1961 nuns were reinstalled in the monastery, and since then it has steadily bloomed. Today it is a small and picturesque monastery, especially when in celebration.
- The ancient fortress of Athenaion is at an altitude of 1356m, near the monastery of the Theotokos at Goura. It was built somewhere between the 5th and 1st century B.C. It was taken over by King Philip V of Macedon, in 189 B.C., during his campaign against the Athamanians. It was destroyed in 46 B.C. by Julius Caesar. There is a mountain path to the castle.
- The arched bridge at Pouri, which is considered to mark the end of the mountains and the beginning of the settlement, a classic example of stonemasonry of the era it was built (1514). This arched bridge was built in 1514 by St. Vissarion, and up to 1936 was the only link between the plains of Thessaly and the villages of Pindos. It is 67 m long, 2.05 m wide, 30.5 m high at the center and its parapet is 0.7 m high. According to the tradition, because St. Vissarion had no money with which to pay the craftsmen, they stopped work on the bridge. A bear then presented itself, which helped to carry the raw materials but also led the chief craftsman to move a large boulder and uncover a treasure. So the workers were paid and the bridge was completed. According to the same tradition, it was St. Vissarion who first crossed the bridge, and threw the chief craftsman's mallet a few kilometers away, and were the mallet was found, the monastery of St. Vissarion was built (in the north bank of the river, where presently the settlement of St. Vissarion or locally known as Dousiko (Δούσικο) is situated).

== Climate ==
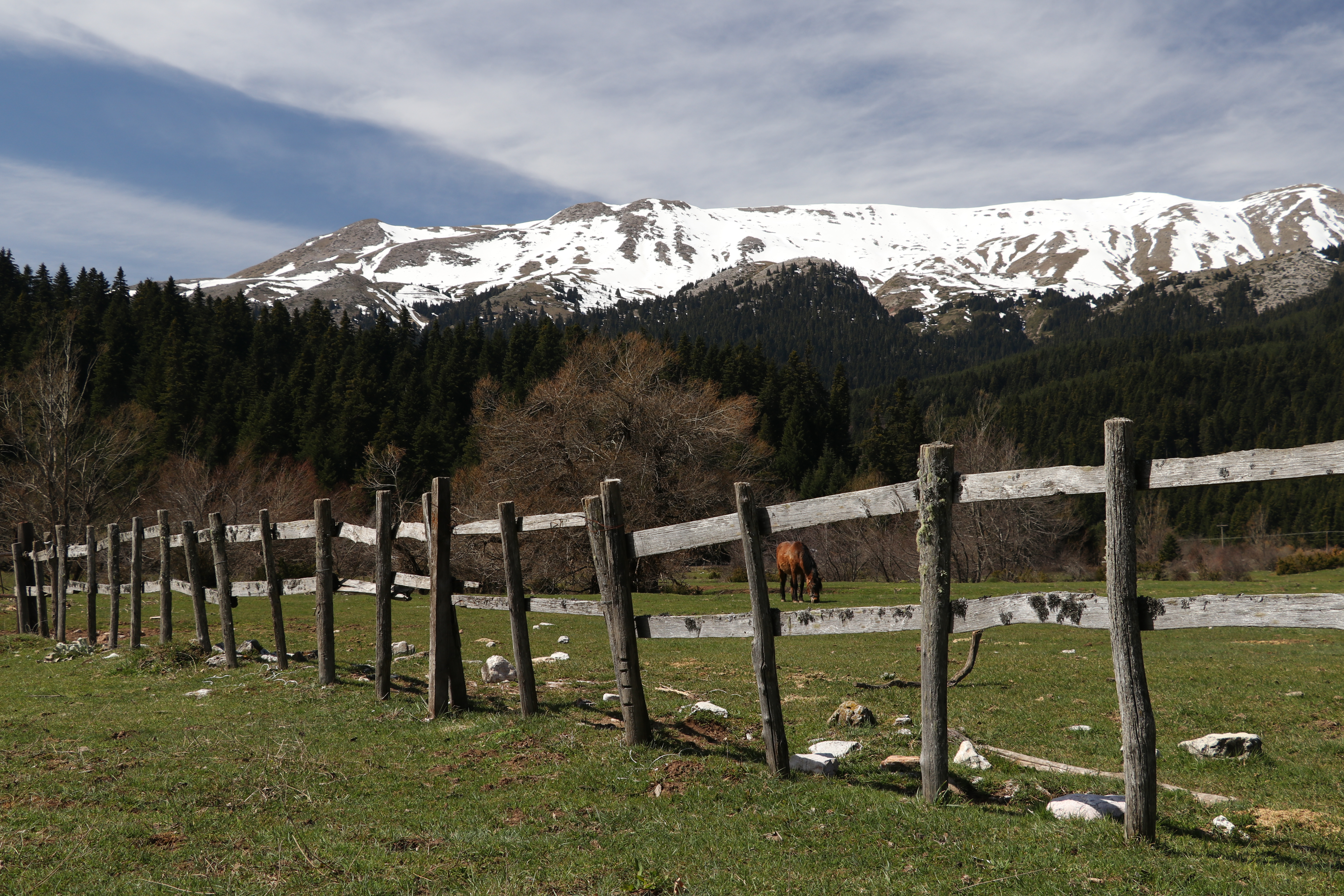
View of Pertouli

The climate in Pyli is worth mentioning since it has characteristics of both the plains and the mountainous regions of Thessaly. It is generally wet in the winter, with regular snowfalls each year averaging 30–40 cm of snow. There are also frequent rains, and low temperatures. In the summer it is arid and hot, though there are occasional buffs of cool breezes coming from the mountains. The surrounding forests and the river foliage of platanus trees provide small pockets of relief in the summer, so Pyli is a favorite stopover for many people from Trikala and the surrounding villages who are in search of some shade.

== Transportation ==
There are regular buses almost every hour from and to Trikala, and tickets are available from and to Pyli directly from either Athens or Thessaloniki. Buses also provide access to the surrounding areas quite frequently (at least once a day), and there is a local cab service available.
