= Trikala (regional unit) =

Trikala Περιφερειακή ενότητα Τρικάλων
- Regional unit
- Municipalities of Trikala

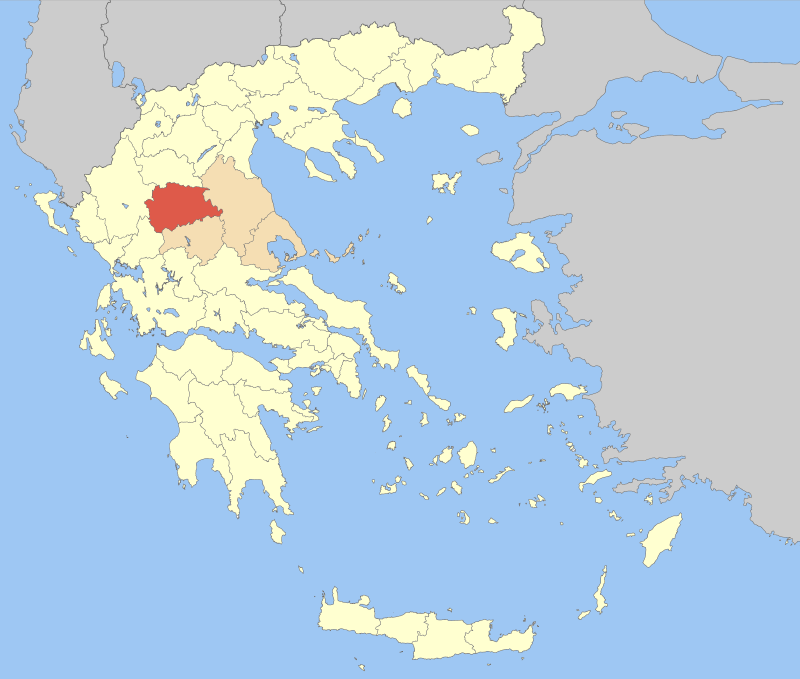
- Trikala within Greece

- Location within Greece
- Coordinates: 39°40′N 21°40′E
- Country: Greece
- Administrative region: Thessaly
- Seat: Trikala

Area
  - Total: 3,383.48 km^{2} (1,306.37 sq mi)

Population (2021)
  - Total: 122,081
  - Density: 36.0815/km^{2} (93.4506/sq mi)
- Time zone: UTC+2 (EET)
  - Summer (DST): UTC+3 (EEST)
- Postal code: 42x xx
- Area code: 243x0
- Vehicle registration: ΤΚ
- Website: www.trikala.gr

Trikala (Greek: Περιφερειακή ενότητα Τρικάλων) is one of the regional units of Greece, forming the northwestern part of the region of Thessaly. Its capital is the city of Trikala. The regional unit includes the town of Kalampaka and the Meteora monastery complex, the town of Pyli, the town of Farkadona and the mountain range of south Pindus with its tourist destinations (i.e. Pyli's stone bridge, Basilica Church of Porta Panagia, Elati, Pertouli, Palaiokarya's stone bridge and waterfall, Pertouli Ski Center etc.).

== Geography ==
Trikala borders the regional units of Karditsa to the south, Arta to the southwest, Ioannina to the west, Grevena to the north and Larissa to the east.

The southeastern part belongs to the Thessalian Plain. The forested Pindus mountain range dominates the western part. The northern part of Trikala is also mountainous and made up of forests and barren lands, the ranges here are Chasia and Antichasia. Its major river is the Pineios, flowing to the south and east.

Its climate is mainly of Mediterranean character, with hot summers and cold winters, along with temperate climate conditions by the mountains.

== Administration ==
The regional unit Trikala is subdivided into 4 municipalities. These are (number as in the map in the infobox):

- Farkadona (4)
- Meteora (2)
- Pyli (3)
- Trikala (1)

=== Prefecture ===
Trikala was created as a prefecture (Greek: Νομός Τρικάλων) in 1882. As a part of the 2011 Kallikratis government reform, the regional unit Trikala was created out of the former prefecture Trikala. The prefecture had the same territory as the present regional unit. At the same time, the municipalities were reorganised, according to the table below.

New municipality	Old municipalities	Seat
Farkadona	Farkadona	Farkadona
Farkadona	Oichalia	Farkadona
Farkadona	Pelinnaioi	Farkadona
Meteora	Kalampaka	Kalampaka
Meteora	Aspropotamos	Kalampaka
Meteora	Vasiliki	Kalampaka
Meteora	Kastania	Kalampaka
Meteora	Kleino	Kalampaka
Meteora	Malakasi	Kalampaka
Meteora	Tymfaia	Kalampaka
Meteora	Chasia	Kalampaka
Pyli	Pyli	Pyli
Pyli	Aithikes	Pyli
Pyli	Gomfoi	Pyli
Pyli	Myrofyllo	Pyli
Pyli	Neraida	Pyli
Pyli	Pialeia	Pyli
Pyli	Pindos	Pyli
Trikala	Trikala	Trikala
Trikala	Estiaiotida	Trikala
Trikala	Kallidendro	Trikala
Trikala	Koziakas	Trikala
Trikala	Megala Kalyvia	Trikala
Trikala	Paliokastro	Trikala
Trikala	Paralithaioi	Trikala
Trikala	Faloreia	Trikala

=== Provinces ===
Trikala prefecture had four provinces and areas named Trikala, Kalampaka, Pyli and Farkadona the four largest towns.

- Province of Trikala
- Province of Kalampaka
- Province of Pyli
- Province of Farkadona

Note: Provinces no longer hold any legal status in Greece.

== History ==
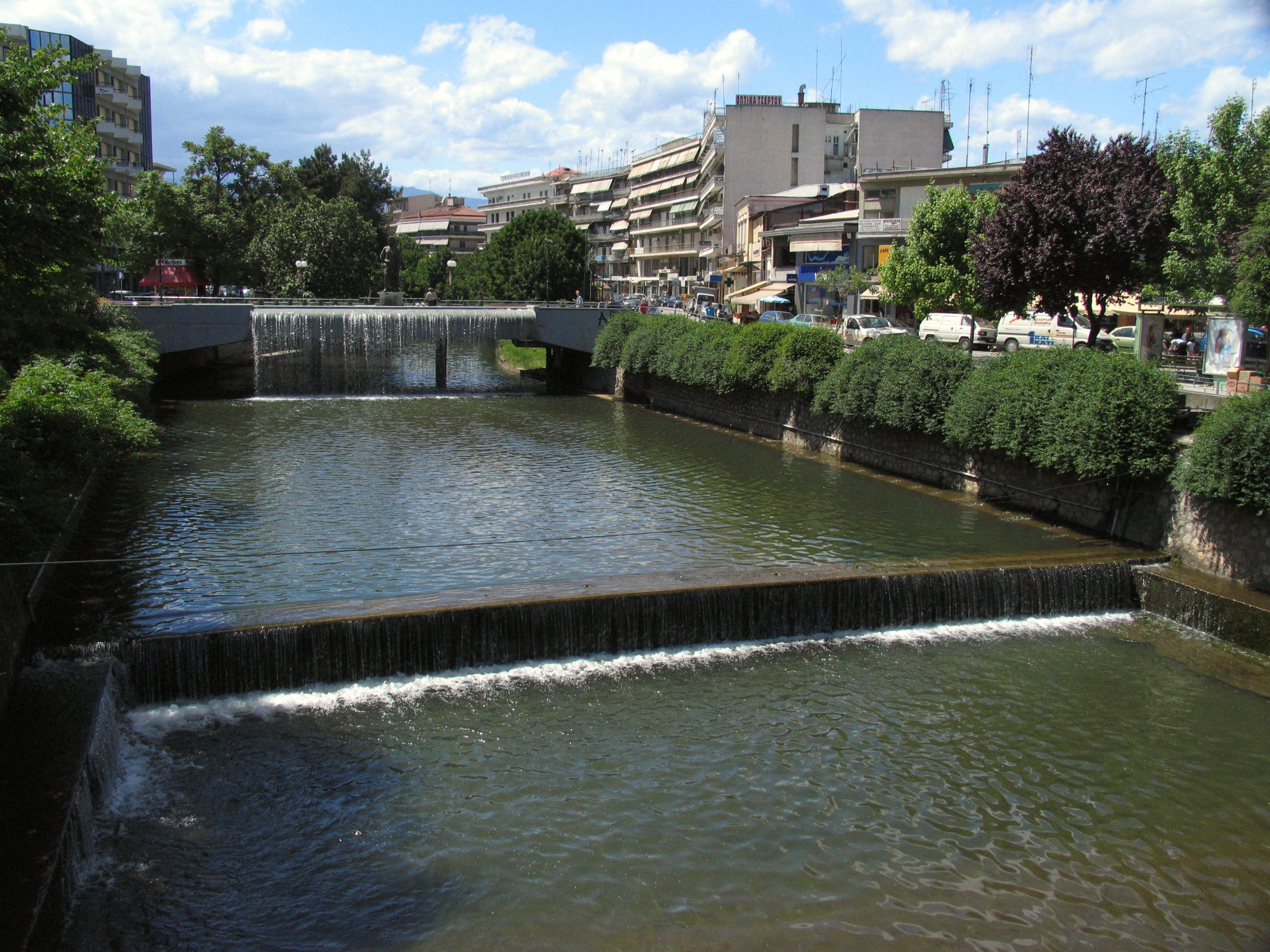
Litheos river flowing through city of Trikala.

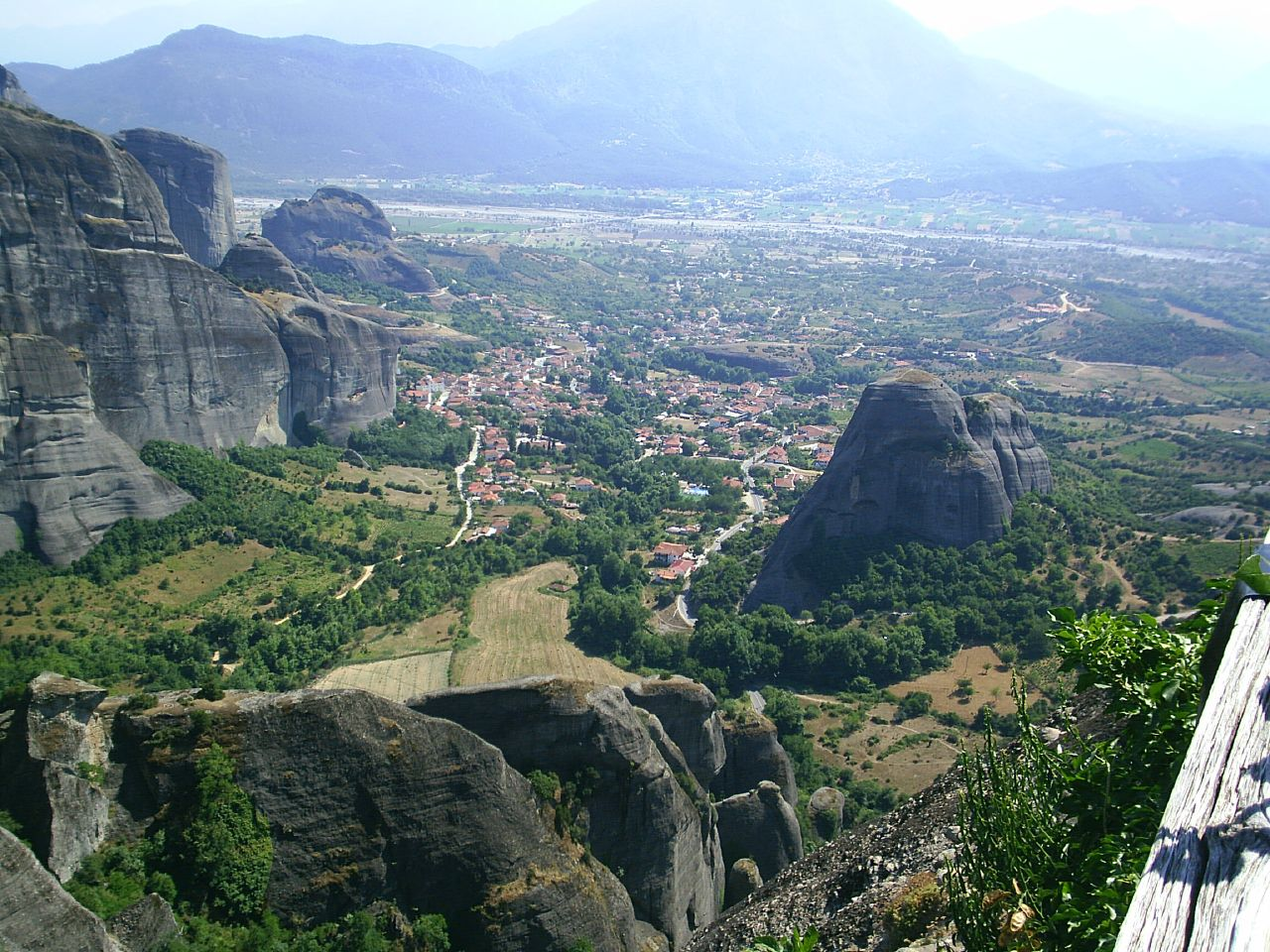
Kalabaka.

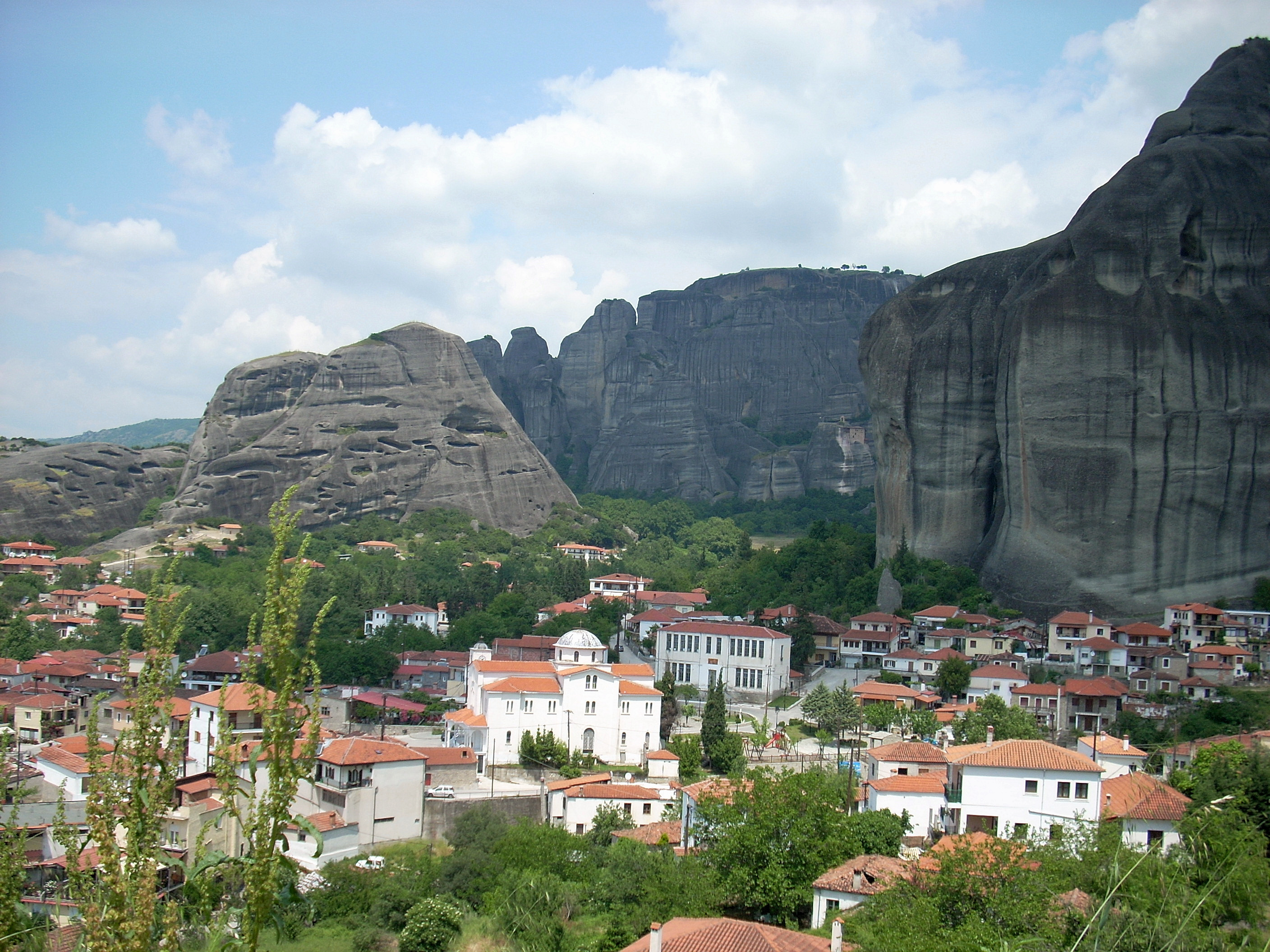
View of Meteora from Kastraki

The area of Trikala was relatively obscure in ancient Thessaly, as well as during the periods of Macedonian, Romans, and Byzantine rule. Under the Ottomans, Trikala was known as "Tırhala" and became the seat of the Sanjak of Tirhala, encompassing most of Thessaly, until the late 18th century. Despite a number of rebellions against Ottoman rule, the area remained under Ottoman control until joined with the independent Kingdom of Greece in 1881.

Upon annexation by Greece, Trikala became the seat of one of the two prefectures in which Thessaly was divided (the other being Larissa Prefecture). The area was briefly occupied by the Ottomans again during the Greco-Turkish War of 1897, and by the Italians and Germans during the Axis occupation of Greece in World War II. In 1947, the southern part was split off as Karditsa Prefecture.

== Economy ==
=== Agriculture ===
The agriculture of the area is famous, and produces a part of the country's production also in export. Its well-known production includes fruit and vegetables, cotton, olives, cattle and other foodstuffs.

== Communications ==
=== Newspapers ===
- I Enimerosi
- I Erevna
- dialogos-weekly newspaper of Trikala "t.24310-33263,fax.2431-500059" www.issuu.com/dialogosnews

== Transport ==
The Palaiofarsalos–Kalambaka railway passes through the regional unit, from Palaiofarsalos and up to Trikala and Kalambaka.

The main roads that pass through the unit and the regional unit's capital are the A3 motorway (part of E65 project), EO6, and EO30: the A2 motorway (E90), passes through the northwestern corner of the unit, near Panagia. Other notable roads in the unit include the EO15 and EO26.

== Sports ==
- AO Trikala
- Trikala 2000 BC
- A.O. Trikala 1963 F.C.
- G.S. Trikala
- G.E.A. Trikala
- G.A.S. Trikala "Zeus"

== See also ==
- List of settlements in the Trikala regional unit
