= List of mountains in Greece =

A list of mountains in Greece:

Peak	Height		Mountain range	Regional unit
Peak	m	ft	Mountain range	Regional unit
Olympus	2,917	9,570	Olympus	Larissa, Pieria
Smolikas	2,637	8,652	Pindus	Ioannina
Kaimaktsalan	2,524	8,281	Voras	Florina, Pella
Gramos	2,520	8,268	Pindus	Ioannina, Kastoria
Giona	2,510	8,235	Pindus	Phocis
Tymfi	2,497	8,192	Pindus	Ioannina
Vardousia (Korakas)	2,495	8,186	Pindus	Phocis, Phthiotis
Parnassus	2,457	8,061	Pindus	Boeotia, Phthiotis
Timios Stavros	2,456	8,058	Ida (Psiloreitis)	Rethymno
Pachnes	2,452	8,045	Lefka Ori	Chania
Athamanika (Kakarditsa)	2,429	7,969	Pindus	Ioannina, Trikala
Taygetus (Profitis Ilias)	2,404	7,887	Taygetus	Laconia, Messenia
Trocharis	2,401	7,877	Lefka Ori	Chania
Mesa Soros	2,397	7,864	Lefka Ori	Chania
Athamanika (Katafydi)	2,393	7,851	Pindus	Arta
Thodoris	2,380	7,808	Lefka Ori	Chania
Kyllini	2,376	7,795	Kyllini	Corinthia
Gavala	2,350	7,710	Lefka Ori	Chania
Bournelos	2,342	7,684	Lefka Ori	Chania
Aroania (Chelmos)	2,340	7,677	Aroania	Achaea
Svourichti	2,337	7,667	Lefka Ori	Chania
Sternes	2,335	7,661	Lefka Ori	Chania
Varnous	2,334	7,657	Varnous	Florina
Tymfristos (Velouchi)	2,315	7,595	Pindus	Evrytania, Phthiotis
Lakmos	2,295	7,530	Pindus	Ioannina, Trikala
Athamanika (Katarrachias)	2,280	7,480	Pindus	Ioannina, Trikala
Vasilitsa	2,249	7,379	Pindus	Grevena, Ioannina
Falakro (Profitis Ilias)	2,232	7,323	Falakro	Drama
Erymanthos	2,227	7,306	Erymanthos	Achaea
Orvilos	2,212	7,257	Orvilos	Drama, Serres
Dousko (Nemërçkë)	2,198	7,211	Pindus	Ioannina
Pieria (Flampouro)	2,190	7,185	Pieria	Kozani, Pieria
Agrafa (Karava)	2,184	7,165	Pindus	Karditsa
Lygkos (Avgo)	2,177	7,142	Pindus	Grevena
Agrafa (Delimidi)	2,163	7,096	Pindus	Evrytania, Karditsa
Agrafa (Voutsikaki)	2,154	7,067	Pindus	Karditsa
Oeta	2,152	7,060	Pindus	Phthiotis
Avgo (southern Pindus)	2,148	7,047	Pindus	Trikala
Dikti (Spathi)	2,148	7,047	Dikti	Lasithi
Verno	2,128	6,982	Verno	Florina, Kastoria
Askio	2,111	6,926	Askio	Kozani
Kaliakouda	2,101	6,893	Pindus	Evrytania
Vermio	2,065	6,775		Imathia
Athos	2,033	6,670		Mount Athos
Kalampaka (Radomir)	2,031	6,663	Kerkini (Belasica)	Serres
Ossa (Kissavos)	1,978	6,490		Larissa
Chelidona	1,975	6,480		Evritania
Mainalo	1,981	6,499		Arcadia
Tomaros	1,974	6,476		Ioannina
Menoikio	1,963	6,440		Drama, Serres
Pangaion	1,956	6,417		Kavala, Serres
Rhodope (Delimposka)	1,953	6,407		Drama
Oligyrtos	1,935	6,348		Arcadia, Argolis, Corinthia
Parnon	1,934	6,345		Arcadia, Laconia
Panachaiko	1,926	6,319		Achaea
Panaitoliko	1,924	6,312		Aetolia-Acarnania
Vourinos	1,866	6,122		Grevena, Kozani
Vrontous	1,849	6,066		Serres
Agrafa (Verousia)	1,835	6,020	Pindus	Karditsa
Zygos	1,820	5,971	Pindus	Ioannina
Mitsikeli	1,810	5,938	Pindus	Ioannina
Mourgana	1,806	5,925		Ioannina, Thesprotia
Voio	1,805	5,922		Kastoria, Kozani
Kedros	1,777	5,830		Rethymno
Artemisio	1,772	5,814		Arcadia, Argolis
Lyrkeio	1,755	5,758		Arcadia, Argolis
Helicon	1,748	5,735		Boeotia
Dirfi	1,743	5,719		Euboea
Othrys (Gerakovouni)	1,726	5,663		Magnesia, Phthiotis
Paiko	1,650	5,413		Kilkis, Pella
Ainos	1,628	5,341		Cephalonia
Xerovouni	1,614	5,295		Ioannina
Fengari	1,611	5,285		Samothrace
Pelion	1,610	5,282		Magnesia
Akarnanika	1,589	5,213		Aetolia-Acarnania
Chasia	1,564	5,131		Trikala
Thrypti (Afentis)	1,476	4,843		Lasithi
Rigani	1,469	4819		Aetolia-Acarnania
Kerkis	1,434	4,705		Samos
Antichasia	1,424	4,672		Larissa, Trikala
Lykaion	1,419	4,656		Arcadia, Messenia
Parnitha	1,413	4,636		East Attica
Cithaeron	1,409	4,623		Boeotia, West Attica
Kallidromo	1,399	4,590		Phthiotis
Ochi	1,398	4,587		Euboea
Geraneia	1,351	4,432		Corinthia, West Attica
Minthi	1,345	4,413		Elis
Lekanis	1,298	4,259		Drama, Kavala
Pelinaio	1,297	4,255		Chios
Thesprotika	1,274	4,180		Preveza
Tsemperou	1,254	4,114		Arcadia
Kantili	1,246	4,088		Euboea
Asterousia (Kofinas)	1,231	4,039		Heraklion
Attavyros	1,216	3,990		Rhodes
Parthenion	1,215	3,986		Arcadia, Argolis
Ypsario	1,203	3,947		Thasos
Chortiatis	1,201	3,940		Thessaloniki
Arachnaio	1,199	3,934		Argolis
Olympus (Euboea)	1,172	3,845		Euboea
Cholomon	1,165	3,822		Chalkidiki
Elati	1,158	3,799		Lefkada
Karvouni	1,153	3,783		Samos
Agia Dynati	1,131	3,711		Cephalonia
Pateras	1,131	3,711		West Attica
Koulochera	1,125	3,691		Laconia
Didymo	1,121	3 677		Argolida
Penteli	1,109	3,638		East Attica, North Athens
Vertiskos	1,103	3,619		Thessaloniki
Kerdylio	1,092	3,583		Serres, Thessaloniki
Kokkini Rachi	1,078	3,537		Cephalonia
Aetheras	1,037	3,402	Ikaria	Ikaria, North Aegean
Klokova	1037	3402		Aetolia-Acarnania
Hymettus	1,026	3,366		East Attica
Messapio (Ktypas)	1,021	3,350		Euboea
Pastra	1,016	3,333		West Attica
Zas	1,004	3,294		Naxos
Zavitsa	974	3,196		Arcadia
Telethrio	970	3,182		Euboea
Varasova	917	3,009		Aetolia-Acarnania
Pantokrator	906	2,972		Corfu
Kalon Oros	901	2,956		Cephalonia
Foloi	780	2,559		Elis
Lapithas	773	2,536		Elis
Profitis Elias	748	2,454		Milos
Zarkos	734	2,408		Larissa, Trikala
Exobourgo	641	2,103		Tinos
Aigaleo	469	1,539		West Athens

== See also ==
- Mount Kythnos
- Movri
- Omplos
- Pantokrator (Corfu)
- Skollis
- Geography of Greece
