= Zarkos Mountains =

Mountain range in Greece

Zarkos
- Ζάρκος
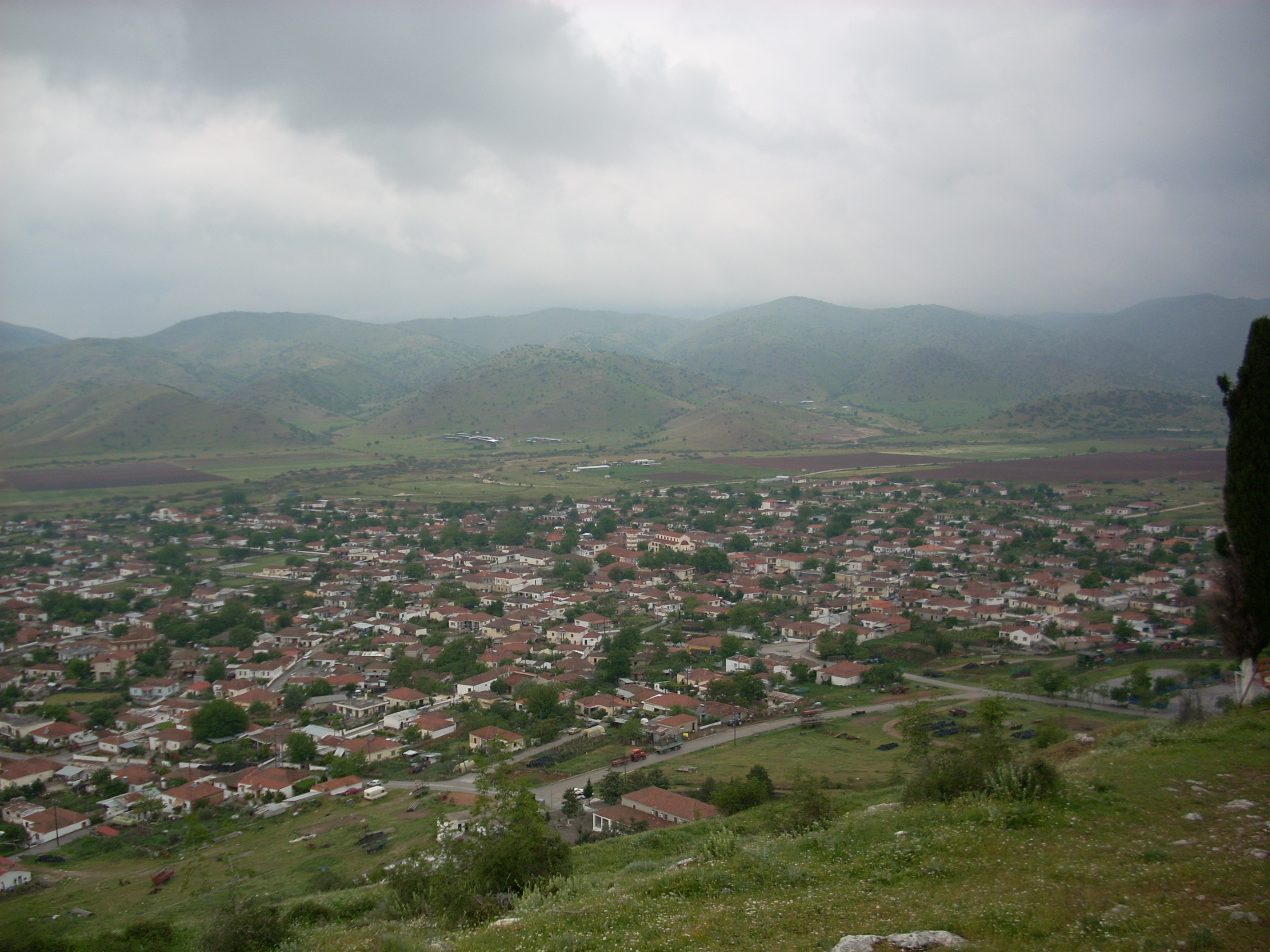
- Zarkos Mountains and Zarko village in Trikala prefecture, Greece.

Highest point
- Elevation: 734 m (2,408 ft)
- Coordinates: 39°39′25″N 22°08′13″E

Geography
- Location within Greece
- Location: Thessaly, Greece

The Zarkos (Greek: Ζάρκος) is a small mountain range in central Thessaly in Greece. It is situated on the border of the Larissa and the Trikala regional unit. Its highest point is 734 m. It is 15 km long and 12 km wide and covers and area of 100 to 150 km^{2}. Grasslands are in the lower elevations and forests in the higher elevations. It is drained by the river Titarisios to the north and the Pineios to the south.

In 2021, the area experienced a series of ruptures along the seismic basement.

== Nearest places ==
- North: Damasi and Vlachogiannio
- South: Pineias, Zarko and Farkadona
- West: Grizano
