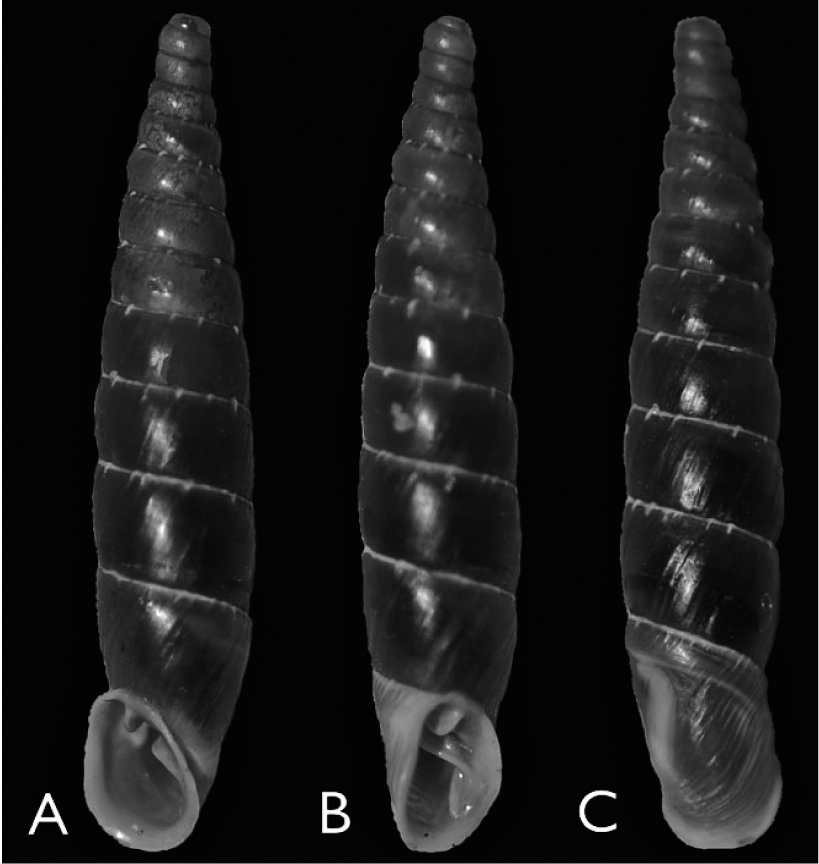
- Three views of a shell of Inchoatia megdova bruggeni

Scientific classification
- Kingdom: Animalia
- Phylum: Mollusca
- Class: Gastropoda
- Order: Stylommatophora
- Infraorder: Clausilioidei
- Superfamily: Clausilioidea
- Family: Clausiliidae
- Genus: Inchoatia (Gittenberger & Uit de Weerd, 2006

= Inchoatia =

Genus of gastropods

Inchoatia is a genus of air-breathing land snails, terrestrial pulmonate gastropod mollusks in the family Clausiliidae, the door snails.

== Description ==
The species classified within the genus Inchoatia are conchologically similar. They all have slender to very slender, small to medium-sized shells with more or less prominent papillae along the suture. The clausilial apparatus is of the so-called "N-type", with a lamella spiralis and a plica principalis. As in genus Albinaria, the genital tract shows a dimorphism in penial structure, with either a papilla or a caecum.

== Distribution ==
The species within this genus occur in limestone areas of the central and western part of mainland Greece, where some taxa are restricted to high altitudes.

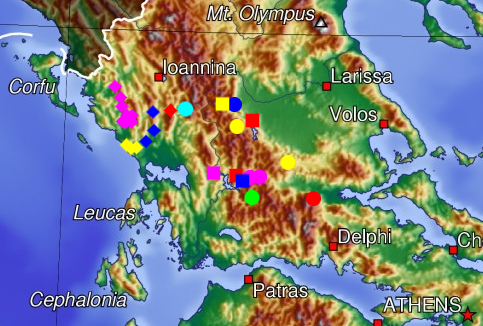
Distribution of three species of Inchoatia in central Greece: yellow dot = Inchoatia haussknechti haussknechti red dot = Inchoatia haussknechti orina violet dot = Inchoatia haussknechti alticola dark blue dot = Inchoatia haussknechti hiltrudae light blue dot = Inchoatia haussknechti refuga yellow diamond = Inchoatia inchoata inchoata red diamond = Inchoatia inchoata klemmi violet diamond = Inchoatia inchoata paramythica dark blue diamond = Inchoatia inchoata regina yellow square = Inchoatia megdova bruggeni red square = Inchoatia megdova megdova violet square = Inchoatia megdova palatalifera dark blue square = Inchoatia megdova tavropodensis

== Taxonomy ==
Some Inchoatia taxa were insufficiently known, even conchologically (in terms of a shell description) and were classified without clear reference to the underlying facts. In the past (Nordsieck 1972, Nordsieck 1974, Zilch 1981) species of the Alopiinae were classified in the genusCarinigera or Sericata, mainly on the anatomical basis of having either a penial papilla or a caecum. This dogmatic approach led to a grouping together of clausiliid species with very different shells, which was eventually unmasked as unnatural by DNA analyses. This position is however not embraced by Nordsieck (2007), who lumped together several genus-group taxa, which "can be characterized neither by shell nor by genital characters", in his view.

The genus Inchoatia was introduced by Gittenberger & Uit de Weerd (2006) on the basis of molecular phylogenetic analyses by Uit de Weerd et al. (2004). This molecular phylogenetic study by Uit de Weerd et al. (2004) was not designed to answer questions about the status of the species group taxa within Inchoatia.

The fact that the Inchoatia taxa are very disjunctly distributed means that attempting to discriminate species as against subspecies is even more of a subjective opinion than usual, because reproductive isolation under natural conditions cannot be observed. An objective or a generally accepted method to weigh morphological differences does not exist. DNA analyses may be extremely helpful, but cannot always be considered decisive with regard to species or subspecies status. Molecular phylogeny reconstructions made clear that reproductive isolation and lineage splitting do not always run entirely parallel, resulting in paraphyletic species. In Inchoatia, with some island-like distributions of presumably high alpine taxa, this may also be the case.

Besides synapomorphic nucleotide substitutions, these taxa share a similar shell shape, and have more or less continuous ranges. According to the molecular data, the major division within Inchoatia is between an Inchoatia inchoata + "Inchoatia regina" subclade, and an Inchoatia haussknechti + Inchoatia megdova subclade. This pattern is congruent with genital anatomical differences between the two subclades, previously used to place them in separate genera Sericata and Carinigera and with conchological similarities between the species within each subclade.

The molecular phylogenetic relationships between nominal subspecies within genus Inchoatia were examined by Uit de Weerd et al. (2009). A cladogram based on sequences of cytochrome-c oxidase I (COI) genes showing phylogenic relations of Inchoatia by Uit de Weerd et al. (2009) (simplified):

- Inchoatia
  - - Inchoatia inchoata paramythica
    - - Inchoatia inchoata inchoata
      - - Inchoatia inchoata klemmi
        - Inchoatia inchoata regina
  - - - - Inchoatia haussknechti alticola
        - Inchoatia megdova megdova
      - - Inchoatia haussknechti hiltrudae
        - Inchoatia haussknechti haussknechti
    - Inchoatia megdova tavropodensis
    - Inchoatia megdova bruggeni

== Species ==
According to Gittenberger & Uit de Weerd (2009) and Uit de Weerd et al. (2009) the genus Inchoatia includes three species, each of which has a number of subspecies:

- Inchoatia haussknechti (O. Boettger, 1886) - synonym: Carinigera haussknechti
  - Inchoatia haussknechti haussknechti (O. Boettger, 1886)
  - Inchoatia haussknechti alticola (Nordsieck, 1974)
  - Inchoatia haussknechti hiltrudae (Nordsieck, 1974)
  - Inchoatia haussknechti orina (Westerlund, 1894)
  - Inchoatia haussknechti refuga (Westerlund, 1894)
  - Inchoatia haussknechti semilaevis (O. Boettger, 1889)
- Inchoatia inchoata (O. Boettger, 1889) - type species, synonym: Sericata inchoata
  - Inchoatia inchoata inchoata (O. Boettger, 1889)
  - Inchoatia inchoata klemmi (Nordsieck, 1972)
  - Inchoatia inchoata paramythica (Nordsieck, 1974)
  - Inchoatia inchoata regina (Nordsieck, 1972)
- Inchoatia megdova (Nordsieck, 1974) - synonym: Carinigera megdova
  - Inchoatia megdova megdova (Nordsieck, 1974)
  - Inchoatia megdova bruggeni Gittenberger & Uit de Weerd, 2009
  - Inchoatia megdova palatalifera (Hausdorf, 1987)
  - Inchoatia megdova tavropodensis (Fauer, 1993)
