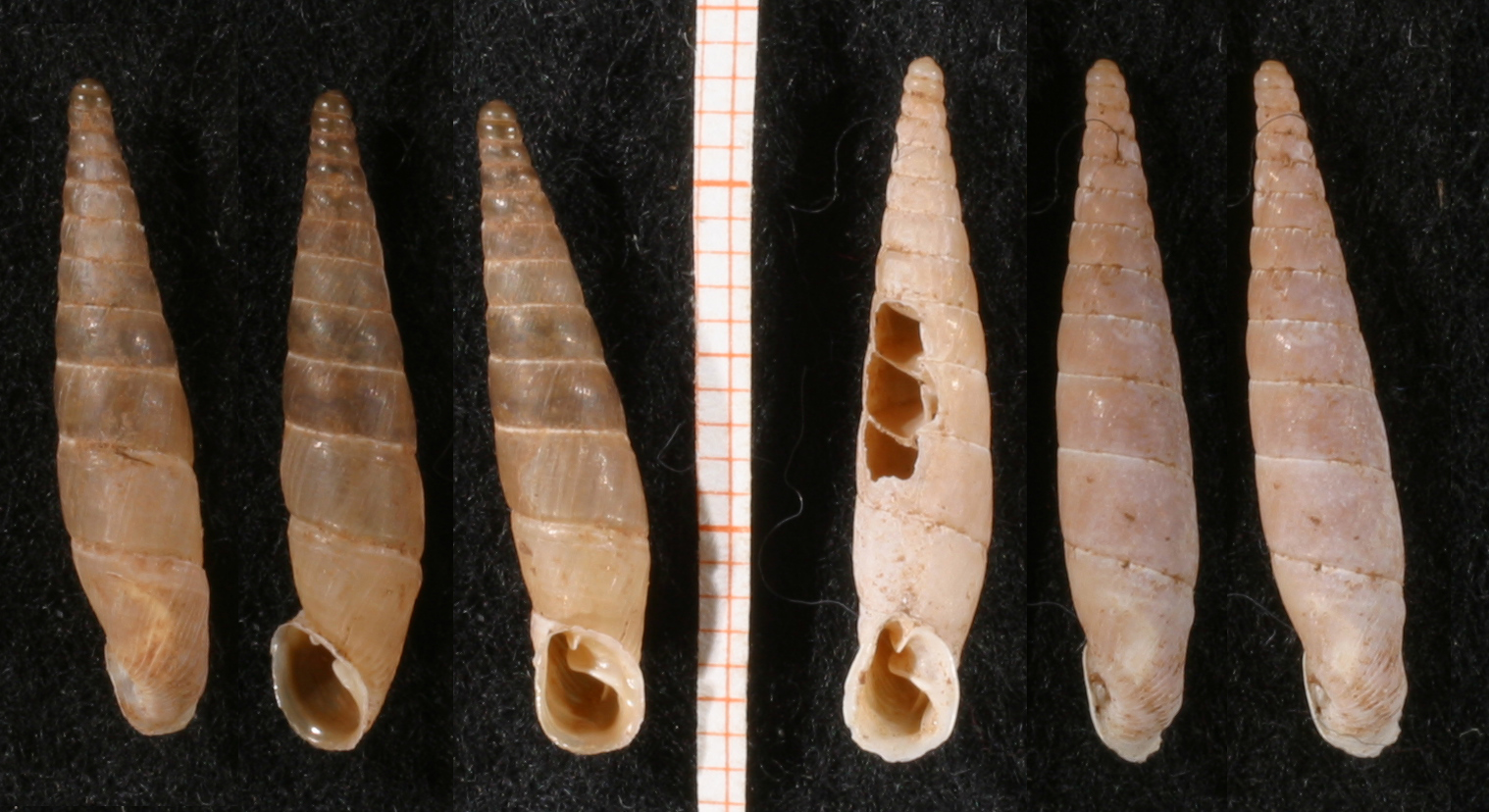
- shells of Inchoatia megdova

Scientific classification
- Kingdom: Animalia
- Phylum: Mollusca
- Class: Gastropoda
- Order: Stylommatophora
- Family: Clausiliidae
- Genus: Inchoatia
- Species: I. megdova

Binomial name
- Inchoatia megdova (Nordsieck, 1974)

Synonyms
- Carinigera megdova Nordsieck, 1974

= Inchoatia megdova =

Species of gastropod

Inchoatia megdova is a species of air-breathing land snail, terrestrial pulmonate gastropod mollusk in the family Clausiliidae, the door snails.

== Description ==
The shell is horny brown, weakly striated. The cervix is more prominently striated. The shell has 11–13 whorls with white suture. The cervix is with weak basal keel. The dorsal keel is very weak if present. The aperture is not detached. The parietalis and columellaris is prominent, lunula dorsolateral, basalis very short. There is no platal callus and no frontal upper palatalis. Subcolumellaris is visible in a perpendicular view. Clausilium plate is usually with edge at the outer margin.

The width of the shell is 3.7–4.5 mm. The height of the shell is 18–23 mm.

Inchoatia megdova differs from Inchoatia haussknechti in the presence of a short basalis, absence of a sulcalis, clausilium plate with edge at the outer margin. Carinigera pharsalica has a less slender shell, the cervical keels are weaker, the suture is even less papillated, a dorsal lunula and no frontal upper palatalis, the outer edge of the clausilium is weaker.

In Inchoatia megdova the shells are broader than 3.0 mm, i.e. larger than in Inchoatia haussknechti, sharp riblets are lacking even on the initial teleoconch whorls, and there is a prominent plica basalis, which is obsolete or lacking completely in Inchoatia haussknechti.

== Distribution ==
Inchoatia megdova is distributed in limestone areas in southern Epirus. The range of this species is very disjunct.

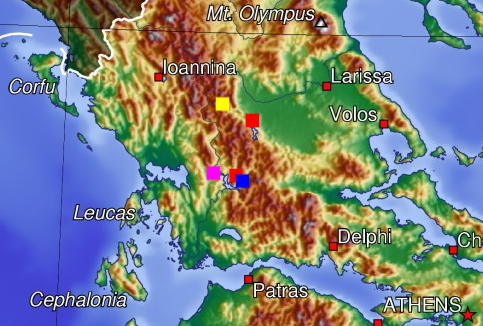
Distribution of Inchoatia megdova in Greece: yellow square = Inchoatia megdova bruggeni red square = Inchoatia megdova megdova violet square = Inchoatia megdova palatalifera dark blue square = Inchoatia megdova tavropodensis

== Subspecies ==
According to Gittenberger & Uit de Weerd (2009), the species Inchoatia megdova includes 4 subspecies:

- Inchoatia megdova megdova (Nordsieck, 1974)
- Inchoatia megdova bruggeni Gittenberger & Uit de Weerd, 2009
- Inchoatia megdova palatalifera (Hausdorf, 1987)
- Inchoatia megdova tavropodensis (Fauer, 1993)

Inchoatia megdova tavropodensis is found c. 10 km as the crow flies from Inchoatia haussknechti alticola, but both taxa are quite different ecologically, occurring at very different altitudes. The population with Inchoatia megdova bruggeni was found only 7 km from the type locality of Inchoatia haussknechti hiltrudae. In this case, both taxa are found at relatively low altitudes, so that Inchoatia haussknechti cannot be considered a high alpine species versus a lowland Inchoatia megdova.

=== Inchoatia megdova megdova ===
Synonyms include:

- Carinigera megdova Nordsieck, 1974
- Carinigera (Carinigera) megdova

Diagnosis: The teleoconch is with rather inconspicuous sutural papillae. The parietal side of the apertural border is not or somewhat protruding. It is without upper palatal plica. The lamella subcolumellaris is not or hardly visible in frontal view.

Range: The type locality is Thessaly, Karditsa: Morfovouni, 1.25 km S of Mesenikolas. Other known locality is: West Greece, Aetolia-Acarnania: 2 km south of Ditiki Frangista, 600 m alt. This subspecies has been reported from the two localities, that are 40 km apart and situated in geographically quite different regions, whereas Inchoatia megdova tavropodensis is reported from only a few km distant of the southern record for Inchoatia megdova megdova. Also after a renewed investigation, based on newly collected material, the surprising observation by Hausdorf (1987) with regard to the distribution of Inchoatia megdova megdova, was confirmed by Gittenberger & Uit de Weerd (2009).

=== Inchoatia megdova bruggeni ===
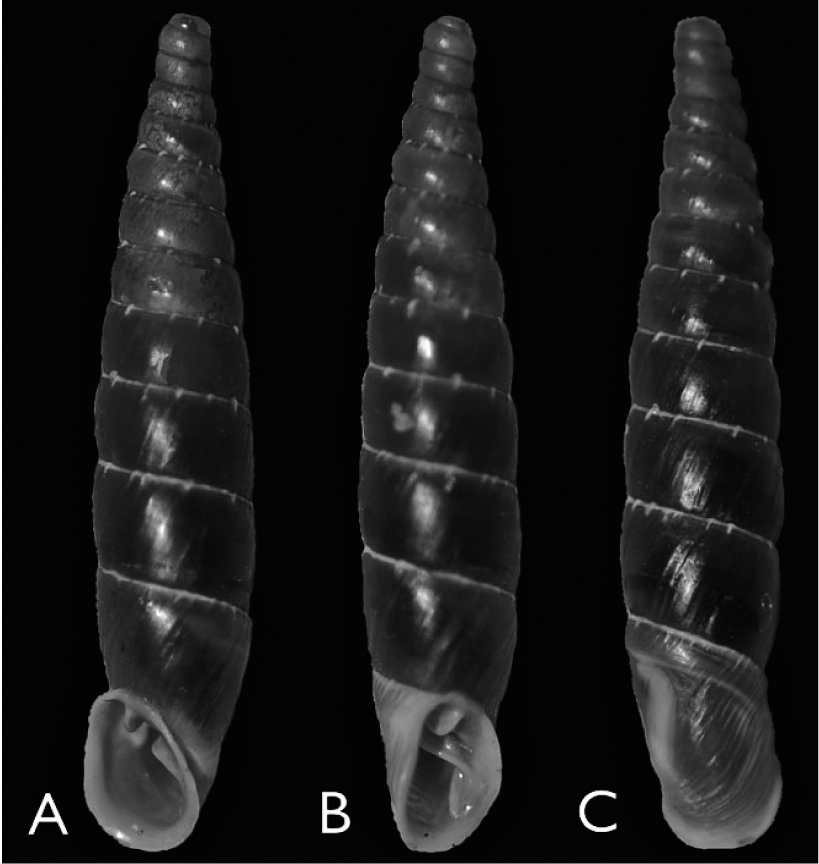
three views of the shell of Inchoatia megdova bruggeni

The specific name bruggeni is in honour of Dutch malacologist Adolph Cornelis van Bruggen.

Diagnosis: The teleoconch is with conspicuous sutural papillae. Parietal side of the apertural border is not protruding. The clausilial apparatus is with a prominent but short plica basalis, a prominent white palatal knob, and a lamella subcolumellaris that is visible in frontal view.

Shell description: The shell is sinistral, with a very slender spire, with nearly straight sides. The shell has 11–12 3/4 whorls. The uppermost whorls are moderately convex and separated by an indented suture, the lower ones increasingly more flattened and separated by an increasingly more shallow suture. The shell is yellowish brown, with a white sutural line and many prominent white papillae along the adapical border of the whorls. On the upper half of the shell, the papillae may be vaguely lengthened in the regular shell colour by striae that reach at most about the periphery of the shell; only the final quarter of the [body whorl] with irregular radial riblets. Cervical part of the body whorl is with a rounded basal keel, separated by an indentation from a rather prominent dorsal hump.

Apertural lip is thickened by a whitish callus, broadly reflected, continuous but not protruding at the parietal side. Clausilial apparatus with a prominent lamella parietalis, reaching about 1/8 whorl into the aperture, where it ends next to the most frontal part of the lamella spiralis, which extends for about 1/2 whorl inside. The lamella columellaris is clearly protruding into the aperture and reaching slightly further than the lamella spiralis inside. The lamella subcolumellaris is prominent, slightly curved and clearly visible in frontal view. Plica principalis is prominent, reaching less far inside than the lamella spiralis, but clearly further than the upper palatal plica, thickened in front where it is connected with a (very) conspicuous white knob, which is shortly lengthened inside, without coming close to the lunella. Lunella situated dorsolaterally; the short posterior part of the upper palatal plica is about as long as the short but relatively conspicuous plica basalis. Clausilial blade is simple, without notches.

The width of the shell is 3.6–4.0 mm. The height of the shell is 16.2–20.3 mm.

Range: The type locality is Greece, Thessaly, Trikala: 7.5 km WNW of Pyli, 8.5 km S of Elati along road to Ag. Prokopios, 675 m alt. This subspecies is known from the type locality only.

=== Inchoatia megdova palatalifera ===
Synonyms include:

- Carinigera (Carinigera) megdova palatalifera Hausdorf, 1987
- Albinaria megdova palatalifera

Diagnosis: The teleoconch is with rather inconspicuous sutural papillae. The parietal side of the apertural border is protruding. The upper palatal plica is prominent. Lamella subcolumellaris is clearly visible in frontal view.

Range: The type locality is "Triklonon 5.5 km Richtung Chalkiopuli"; Greece, West Greece, Aetolia-Acarnania: Triklono, 5.5 km to Chalkiopouli. This subspecies is only known from the type locality.

=== Inchoatia megdova tavropodensis ===
Synonyms include:

- Carinigera (Carinigera) tavropodensis Fauer, 1993
- Carinigera megdova
- Albinaria semilaevis tavropodensis

Diagnosis: Teleoconch is with conspicuous sutural papillae. The parietal side of the apertural border is not or slightly protruding. The upper palatal plica is prominent. Lamella subcolumellaris is not or hardly visible in frontal view.

According to Nordsieck (2007) this taxon is “.. clearly more similar to Carinigera semilaevis than to Carinigera megdova; its occurrence is nearer to the type locality of Carinigera semilaevis than to that of Carinigera megdova.” The obvious similarity should have been specified to take this view into consideration. The location of type localities cannot be accepted as indicative, especially not since according to Hausdorf (1987: 174). According to Gittenberger & Uit de Weerd (2009), the closest congeneric population belongs to Inchoatia megdova megdova.

Range: The type locality is "am Fluß Tavropos, Kalkfelsen bei der Brücke, 26 km von Karpenision, etwa 340 m ü.M.". Gittenberger & Uit de Weerd (2009) have found this subspecies at Evrytania, Greece: 11.5 km WNW of Karpenisi (road to Agrinio), 370 m alt. Most probably this is also the type locality so this subspecies is only known from the type locality.
