= Paiko =

Paiko may refer to:

- Mount Paiko (Greek Πάικον Όρος), a mountain in the Macedonian region of Greece
- Paiko (band), a rock-pop band from Paraguay
