= Krini, Trikala =

Krini Κρήνη
- Community
- Location within Greece
- Coordinates: 39°37′N 22°1′E
- Country: Greece
- Administrative region: Thessaly
- Regional unit: Trikala
- Municipality: Farkadona
- Municipal unit: Oichalia

Population (2021)
  - Community: 631
- Time zone: UTC+2 (EET)
  - Summer (DST): UTC+3 (EEST)
- Vehicle registration: ΤΚ

Krini (Greek: Κρήνη meaning "source", before 1955: Βοστίδι - Vostidi) is a village in the municipal unit of Oichalia in the southeastern part of the Trikala regional unit, Greece. It is situated on the edge of the Thessalian Plain, 6 km northwest of Farkadona.

== Population ==
Year	Population
1981	1,052
1991	1,042
2001	895
2011	733
2021	631

== See also ==
- List of settlements in the Trikala regional unit
