= Achladochori =

Achladochori (Greek: Αχλαδοχώρι, "pear village"), older form Achladochorion (Αχλαδοχώριον) can refer to one of the following localities in Greece:

- Achladochori, Messenia
- Achladochori, Pella
- Achladochori, Serres
- Achladochori, Trikala
