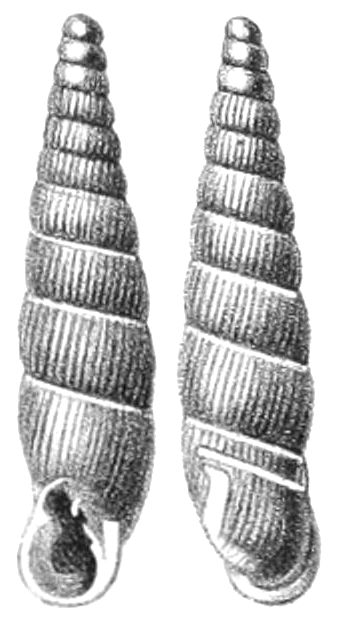
- two views of the shell of Inchoatia haussknechti haussknechti from its type description by Oskar Boettger

Scientific classification
- Domain: Eukaryota
- Kingdom: Animalia
- Phylum: Mollusca
- Class: Gastropoda
- Order: Stylommatophora
- Family: Clausiliidae
- Genus: Inchoatia
- Species: I. haussknechti

Binomial name
- Inchoatia haussknechti (O. Boettger, 1886)

Synonyms
- Clausilia (Albinaria) Haussknechti Boettger, 1886

= Inchoatia haussknechti =

Species of gastropod

Inchoatia haussknechti is a species of air-breathing land snail, a terrestrial pulmonate gastropod mollusk in the family Clausiliidae, the door snails.

== Description ==
The shell is dark horny brownish, very finely striated, slightly coarser at the cervix. The shell has 9-11 whorls. The cervix is with strong basal and dorsal keels and a basal forrow in between, also inside the aperture. The columellaris is not very prominent, the frontal upper palatalis is short, basalis is short, subcolumellaris is visible in an oblique view.

The width of the shell is 3-3.5 mm. The height of the shell is 13–17 mm.

== Distribution ==
Inchoatia haussknechti is distributed in limestone areas from south Epirus to Central Greece.

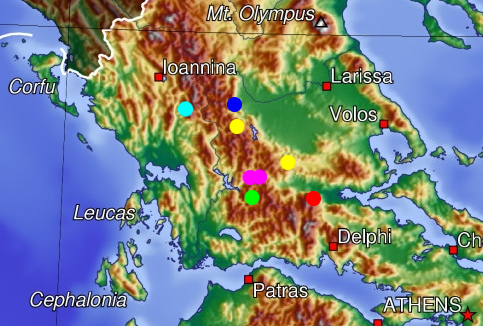
Distribution of Inchoatia haussknechti in Greece: yellow dot = Inchoatia haussknechti haussknechti red dot = Inchoatia haussknechti orina violet dot = Inchoatia haussknechti alticola dark blue dot = Inchoatia haussknechti hiltrudae light blue dot = Inchoatia haussknechti refuga

== Subspecies ==
According to the Gittenberger & Uit de Weerd (2009) the species Inchoatia haussknechti include 6 subspecies:

- Inchoatia haussknechti haussknechti (O. Boettger, 1886)
- Inchoatia haussknechti alticola (Nordsieck, 1974)
- Inchoatia haussknechti hiltrudae (Nordsieck, 1974)
- Inchoatia haussknechti orina (Westerlund, 1894)
- Inchoatia haussknechti refuga (Westerlund, 1894)
- Inchoatia haussknechti semilaevis (O. Boettger, 1889)

=== Inchoatia haussknechti haussknechti ===
Synonyms include:

- Sericata (Sericata) haussknechti haussknechti
- Carinigera (Carinigera) haussknechti haussknechti
- Albinaria haussknechti haussknechti

Diagnosis: The entire teleoconch is with sharp, mostly whitened riblets. The parietal side of the apertural border is not protruding. Lamella columellaris is shortly protruding into the aperture. Lamella parietalis is moderately long, i.e. reaching slightly further than the lamella spiralis. The lunella is prominent.

Range: The type locality is Greece, Thessalia, Karditsa: northern side of the Voutsikaki Mts (= 25 km WSW of Karditsa). The type locality ‘Gion Skala’, apparently a high, narrow passage, cut through the rocks at the northern side of the Voutsikaki Mountains, could be located on the basis of the detailed excursion report by Stussiner, in Boettger (1886: 47). The disjunct range of this subspecies is built up by three populations in the eastern Pindos Mountains.

Notes: The population that was discovered recently at an isolated limestone outcrop near Mesochori, is located 45 km SE of the type locality. The Mount Oeta, where according to Nordsieck (1972, 1974) the same subspecies occurs (see Inchoatia haussknechti orina), is situated 35 km SE of Mesochori and 80 km SE of the Voutsikaki Mts. It should be investigated whether these disjunctions, which are quite extreme when compared with the distributional patterns of the other subspecies, are not correlated with any taxonomically relevant differentiation.

=== Inchoatia haussknechti alticola ===
Synonyms include:

- Carinigera haussknechti alticola Nordsieck, 1974 - pl. 3 fig. 9 (holotype)
- Carinigera (Carinigera) haussknechti alticola
- Albinaria semilaevis alticola

Diagnosis: Initial teleoconch whorls with lengthened white papillae, without regular riblets; parietal side of the apertural border not protruding; lamella parietalis short; lamella columellaris (very) low; lunella rather prominent.

Range: This subspecies is known from the Mt. Timfristos (= Veluchi) area, north of Karpenisi. The type locality is 4 km north of Karpenisi, Mt. Timfristos ski resort, 1900 m alt.

Initially (Nordsieck, 1972) this form was not separated from Inchoatia haussknechti semilaevis.

=== Inchoatia haussknechti hiltrudae ===
Synonyms include:

- Carinigera haussknechti hiltrudae Nordsieck, 1974 - pl. 4 fig. 10 (holotype)
- Carinigera (Carinigera) haussknechti hiltrudae
- Albinaria hiltrudae

Diagnosis: Initial teleoconch whorls with often whitened riblets, which become more irregular and are often not whitened on the lower whorls; parietal side of the apertural border usually protruding; lamella columellaris clearly protruding into the aperture; lamella parietalis moderately long, i.e. reaching slightly further than the lamella spiralis; lunella prominent.

Range: This subspecies is only known from the type locality: Greece, Thessalia, Trikala: 1 km W of Pyli (= Pili), near the classical bridge, 300 m alt.

=== Inchoatia haussknechti orina ===
Synonyms include:

- Clausilia (Albinaria) orina Westerlund, 1894
- Carinigera (Carinigera) haussknechti orina
- Albinaria haussknechti orina

Material.― Greece, Fthiotida/Fokida, Mt. Oiti (= Iti), c. FH1097 (but see ‘Range’).

Diagnosis.― See the notes.

Range: The type locality ‘Koraki Besa im Oetagebirge’ (Westerlund, 1894: 175) could not be located. The Mt Oeta is nowadays called Oiti or Iti Oros (situated 20 km SW of Lamia). Nordsieck (1974: 148) suggested that ‘Koraki Besa’ refers to the Korax Mtn (= Korakas) in the Vardousia Mts (about 35 km SW of Lamia), c. 15 km SW of the Oiti Oros. The area should be visited to get more certainty. The material examined by Gittenberger & Uit de Weerd (2009) is listed as: "Greece, Fthiotida/Fokida, Mt. Oiti (= Iti), c. FH1097".

Neither a detailed description nor a figure is available, but a lectotype has been selected by Nordsieck (1972: 16). Nordsieck (1972: 16; 1974: 148) considered this taxon a synonym of the nominate subspecies, whereas Zilch (1981: 125) and Nordsieck (2007: 48) listed it as a subspecies, without adding more data.

=== Inchoatia haussknechti refuga ===
Synonyms include:

- Clausilia (Albinaria) refuga Westerlund, 1894
- Sericata (Sericata) haussknechti refuga - Nordsieck (1972): plate 2, fig. 21 (lectotype).
- Carinigera (Carinigera) haussknechti refuga
- Albinaria haussknechti refuga

Diagnosis: The entire teleoconch is with sharp, mostly whitened riblets. The parietal side of the apertural border is protruding. Lamella columellaris is shortly protruding into the aperture. The lower part of the lunella is obsolete. The subspecies was characterized, with the designation of a lectotype, by Nordsieck (1972).

Range: Only known from the type locality. ‘Katafiyi (800 m)’ and ‘Katafiyi (2000 m)’, mentioned by Nordsieck (1972), refer to Katafigio (= Katafiyion) at the western foot of the Tschumerka Mts.

=== Inchoatia haussknechti semilaevis ===
Synonyms include:

- Clausilia (Albinaria) haussknechti var. semilaevis O. Boettger, 1889
- Sericata (Sericata) haussknechti semilaevis - Nordsieck (1972): 16, plate 2, figure 20 (lectotype)
- Carinigera (Carinigera) haussknechti semilaevis - Zilch (1981): 125, plate 12, figure 14 (lectotype).
- Albinaria semilaevis semilaevis

Diagnosis: Only the initial whorls of the teleoconch and the cervical part with sharp, partly whitened riblets; parietal side of the apertural border not protruding; lamella columellaris shortly protruding into the aperture; lunella prominent.

Range: The type locality of this subspecies is indicated in a somewhat misleading way because the Mt Veluchi (= Velouhi) or Mt Timfristos is situated a few km N of Karpenisi, where Inchoatia haussknechti alticola occurs, whereas “Kaljakuda” refers to Mt Kaliakouda, 16 km SSW of Karpenisi. The localities ‘Karpenission’ and ‘Timfristos-Geb. 13 km n. Karpenission’, cited for this subspecies by Nordsieck (1972), should be transferred to Inchoatia haussknechti alticola, though only the latter record is repeated (in a slightly different wording) by Nordsieck (1974).
