= Oichalia, Trikala =

Oichalia Οιχαλία
- Municipal unit
- Location within the regional unit

- Location within Greece
- Coordinates: 39°36′N 21°59′E
- Country: Greece
- Administrative region: Thessaly
- Regional unit: Trikala
- Municipality: Farkadona

Area
  - Municipal unit: 85.6 km^{2} (33.1 sq mi)

Population (2021)
  - Municipal unit: 4,178
  - Municipal unit density: 48.8/km^{2} (126/sq mi)
  - Community: 2,115
- Time zone: UTC+2 (EET)
  - Summer (DST): UTC+3 (EEST)
- Vehicle registration: ΤΚ

Oichalia Greek: Οιχαλία, before 1981: Νεοχώρι - Neochori) is a town and a former municipality in the Trikala regional unit, Thessaly, Greece. Since the 2011 local government reform it is part of the municipality Farkadona, of which it is a municipal unit. The municipal unit has an area of 85.628 km^{2}. Oichalia is located 8 km west of Farkadona centre, and 20 km east of the city of Trikala. It is situated on the edge of the Thessalian Plain near the ancient city of Oechalia. The Greek National Road 6 (Larissa - Trikala - Ioannina - Igoumenitsa) passes south of Oichalia.

== Subdivisions ==
The municipal unit Oichalia is subdivided into the following communities:

- Georganades
- Klokotos
- Krini
- Oichalia
- Petroto

== Population ==
Year	Community population	Municipal unit population
1981	3,221	-
1991	3,271	6,567
2001	2,936	5,783
2011	2,357	4,781
2021	2,115	4,178

== See also ==
- List of settlements in the Trikala regional unit
