= Messapio =

Mountain range in Greece

- Μεσσάπιο
- Location within Greece

Highest point
- Elevation: 1,021 m (3,350 ft)
- Coordinates: 38°27′54″N 23°29′13″E

Geography
- Location: Boeotia and mainland Euboea, Greece

The Messapio (Greek: Μεσσάπιο, also known as Ktypas (Κτυπάς)) is a small mountain range located in the northeastern part of Boeotia and the mainland part of Euboea regional unit in central Greece. It borders on the North Euboean Gulf and the Euripus Strait to the north and east. Its highest point is 1,021 m. It is 20 km long and 10 to 15 km wide and covers an area of 300 km^{2}. It separates the area around Chalcis from the Boeotian plains around Thebes. In the south, on the slope of the 740 m high mountain Ypato, there is the monastery of the Transfiguration of the Saviour. The nearest mountain ranges are the Ptoo to the northwest. The A1 motorway (Athens - Larissa - Thessaloniki) passes south of the mountain.

== Settlements ==
- North: Loukisia, Anthidona
- East: Chalcis, Vathy and Ritsona
- South: Ypato
- West: Mouriki

== History ==
The Messapion was mentioned by Pausanias in his Description of Greece. Most of the mountain used to be covered with dense pine forests, and it was rich in animals such as foxes, jackals and wolves. But fires and deforestation have largely destroyed the forests since the 1940s.
