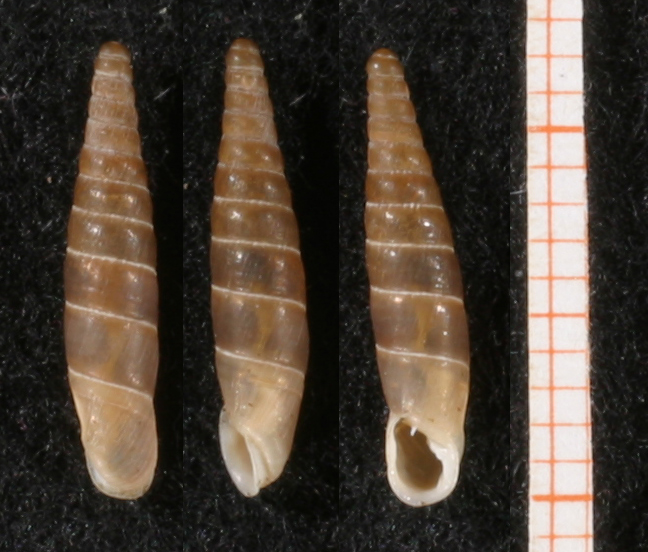
- Abapertural, lateral and apertural views of shells of Inchoatia inchoata

Scientific classification
- Domain: Eukaryota
- Kingdom: Animalia
- Phylum: Mollusca
- Class: Gastropoda
- Order: Stylommatophora
- Family: Clausiliidae
- Genus: Inchoatia
- Species: I. inchoata

Binomial name
- Inchoatia inchoata (O. Boettger, 1889)

Synonyms
- Clausilia (Agathylla) inchoata Boettger, 1889; Sericata inchoata (Boettger, 1889)

= Inchoatia inchoata =

Species of gastropod

Inchoatia inchoata is a species of air-breathing land snail, a terrestrial pulmonate gastropod mollusc in the family Clausiliidae, the door snails.

== Description ==
The shell is horny brown in color, weakly striated and shiny. The shell has 9-12 whorls with white suture, often papillated. The cervix is rounded. The aperture is U-shaped, inside yellowish brown. The apertural margin is white and not connected at parietal side. Parietalis is strong. Columellaris is with nodules and not very prominent. Lunula is lateral and ]-shaped. there is no basalis. Subcolumellaris is visible in the aperture.

The width of the shell is 2.3-2.8 mm. The height of the shell is 10–12 mm.

== Distribution ==
Inchoatia inchoata occurs in Epirus in Greece.

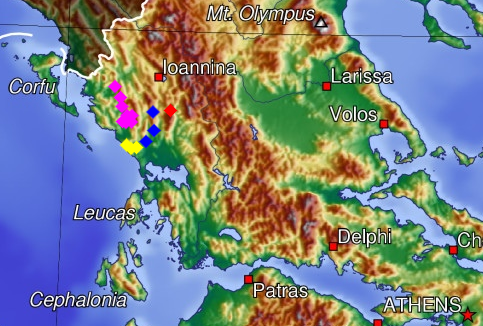
Distribution of Inchoatia inchoata in Greece: yellow diamond = Inchoatia inchoata inchoata red diamond = Inchoatia inchoata klemmi violet diamond = Inchoatia inchoata paramythica dark blue diamond = Inchoatia inchoata regina

== Subspecies ==
According to Gittenberger & Uit de Weerd (2009) the species Inchoatia haussknechti include 4 subspecies:

- Inchoatia inchoata inchoata (O. Boettger, 1889)
- Inchoatia inchoata klemmi (Nordsieck, 1972)
- Inchoatia inchoata paramythica (Nordsieck, 1974)
- Inchoatia inchoata regina (Nordsieck, 1972)

=== Inchoatia inchoata inchoata ===
Synonyms include:

- Clausilia (Agathylla) inchoata O. Boettger, 1889
- Sericata (Sericata) inchoata inchoata
- Sericata inchoata
- Albinaria inchoata inchoata; Nordsieck, 2007: 44.

Diagnosis: The shell is hardly different from Inchoatia inchoata paramythica. Teleoconch is with prominent white papillae, continuing as blunt riblets in the background shell colour, on most of the whorls. Parietal side of the apertural border is not protruding. The lamella parietalis reaches the lamella spiralis or is shorter. The lamella columellaris is very low.

Range: This subspecies occurs in the mountains c. 20 km north of Preveza. The type locality is "Zalongo bei Libochovo", Greece, Ipiros, Preveza: Zalongo, 21 km NNW of Preveza, 200 m and 650–725 m alt.

=== Inchoatia inchoata klemmi ===
Synonyms include:

- Sericata (Sericata) inchoata klemmi Nordsieck, 1972
- Albinaria inchoata klemmi

Diagnosis: With some white papillae on the initial teleoconch whorls only, following whorls rather glossy, without any riblets. Parietal side of the apertural border is not protruding. Lamella columellaris is very low.

Range: This subspecies is only known from near Platanousa. The type locality is "Platanoussa bei Ioannina [650 m]".

=== Inchoatia inchoata paramythica ===
Synonyms include:

- Sericata (Sericata) inchoata paramythica Nordsieck, 1974
- Albinaria inchoata paramythica

This is by far the most common subspecies in Inchoatia.

Diagnosis: The shell is hardly different from Inchoatia inchoata inchoata. Teleoconch with prominent white papillae, continuing as blunt riblets, sometimes whitened but more often in the background shell colour, on most of the whorls. Parietal side of the apertural border is not protruding. Lamella parietalis is reaching beyond the end of the lamella spiralis. Lamella columellaris very low.

Range: Inchoatia inchoata paramythica is known from several localities at relatively low altitudes in Mt Paramithias and the adjoining mountain chains to the north and to the south. The type locality is "Gliki 4 km Richtung Frosini".

=== Inchoatia inchoata regina ===
Synonyms include:

- Sericata (Sericata) regina Nordsieck, 1972
- Sericata regina
- Albinaria regina

Diagnosis: Teleoconch is with some white papillae on the initial whorls only, following whorls rather glossy, without any riblets. Parietal side of the apertural border is protruding. Lamella columellaris is somewhat protruding into the aperture.

Range: The type locality is "Louros-Durchbruch nahe Ay. Yeoryios bei Arta", Louros gorge (of the Louros river) near Ay. Yeoryios.
