= Kromni, Pella =

Kromni, Pella Κρώμνη
- Settlement
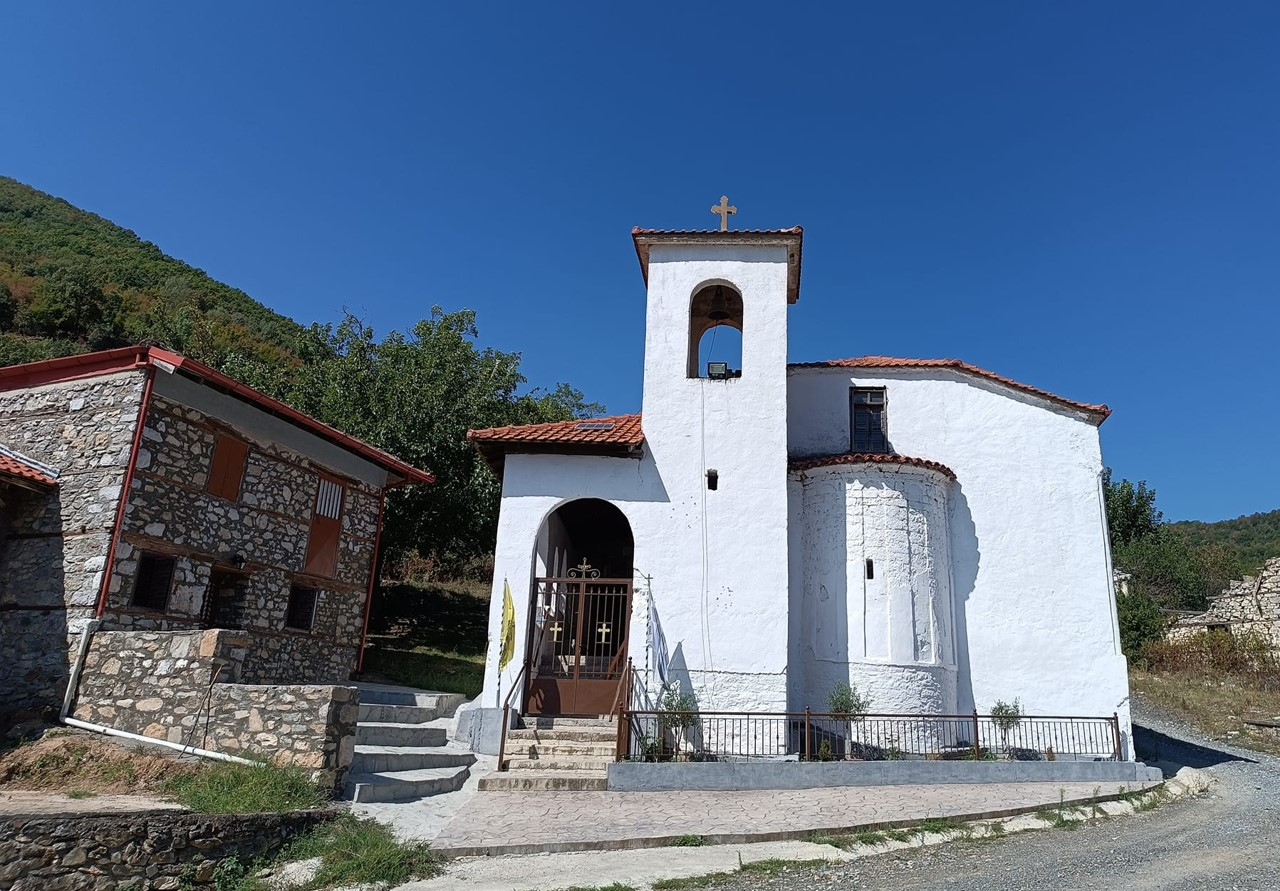
- The Church of Agios Nikolaos

- Location within Greece
- Coordinates: 40°54′13″N 22°19′54″E
- Country: Greece
- Geographic region: Macedonia
- Administrative region: Central Macedonia
- Municipality: Pella
- Municipal unit: Kyrros
- Community: Mylotopos

Population (2021)
  - Rural: 3
- Time zone: UTC+2 (EET)
  - Summer (DST): UTC+3 (EEST)

Kromni (Greek: Κρώμνη, known till 1926 as Kornishor Greek: Κορνισιόρ; Bulgarian: Корнишор) is a historic mountainous village in Greece, located in Pella, Central Macedonia. Administratively, it belongs to the community of Mylotopos, in the municipal unit of Kyrros. The settlement is built on the foothills of Mount Paiko, at an altitude of approximately 580 metres above sea level, within a steep ravine traversed by the Grammoska stream, a tributary of the Axios River. According to the 2021 census, the settlement has a population of three inhabitants.

The natural environment of Kromni is characterised by extensive and dense forest vegetation, within which natural springs, cave formations, and traditional stone-built fountains are encountered. The settlement lies approximately 19 kilometres north of Giannitsa; however, due to the rugged topography of the area, access requires approximately 50 minutes. The safest road access is via Neos Mylotopos.

Kromni is a seasonally inhabited settlement which, despite the absence of a permanent population, maintains an active presence through the care and regular visits of its former residents. Individuals originating from Kromni have established the Cultural Association of Kromniotes "Agios Nikolaos", aiming to preserve and promote the local customs, traditions, and folkloric heritage of the settlement. In the contemporary context, Kromni functions primarily as a place of recreation and historical memory for descendants of its inhabitants and for visitors who maintain cultural and emotional ties to the area.

== Settlement Morphology ==
Kromni was officially designated as a traditional settlement in 1992 and has preserved intact the morphological and structural characteristics of traditional Macedonian architecture. All residential buildings within the settlement survive in an unaltered state and are constructed of stone and wood, either whitewashed or coated with red earth plaster. A defining architectural feature of these houses is the hagiati (covered open gallery), which constitutes a dominant element of the local domestic architecture. The architectural fabric of the settlement provides valuable evidence regarding the everyday life of its inhabitants as well as their formerly prosperous economic conditions. Of particular significance is the post-Byzantine Church of Agios Nikolaos (1858), which is distinguished by its rare wall paintings, icons, and ecclesiastical artefacts dating to the 19th-century. Notably, the settlement lacks of electricity and an organised road network, with the sole exception of a road whose construction remained incomplete. This condition has contributed substantially to the preservation of Kromni’s authentic and unembellished architectural and spatial character.

== History ==
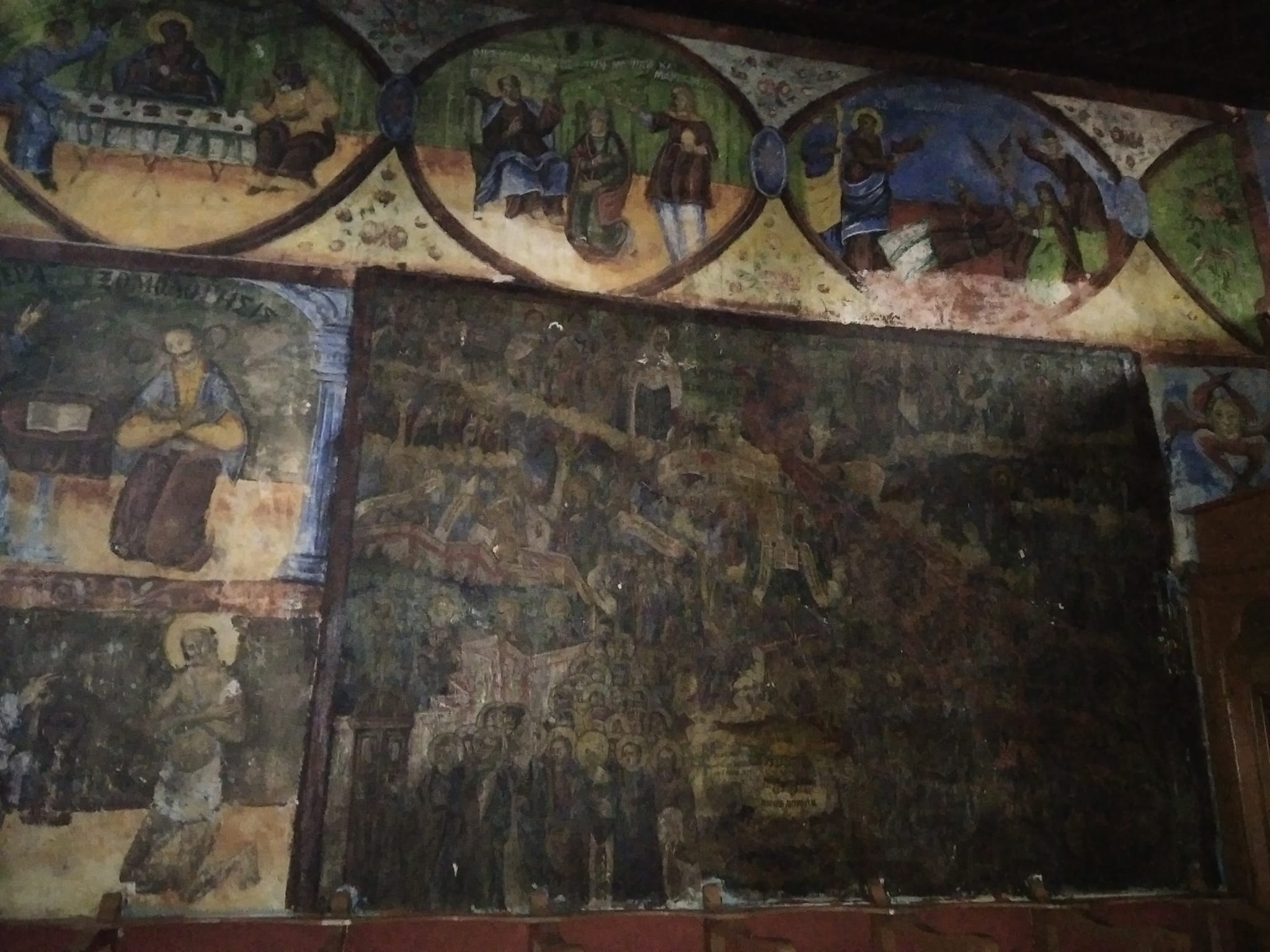
Wall painting inside the church

Kromni constitutes a particularly ancient settlement, a fact supported by local tradition, according to which the village was founded during the Roman period, one or two centuries after the Battle of Pydna (148 BC), as a result of the unification of five smaller settlements scattered across Mount Paiko. Some of these settlements are said to have experienced notable prosperity during the reigns of Philip II of Macedon and Alexander the Great.

The earliest known written reference to Kromni appears on an Ottoman map dated to 1530, where it is recorded under the name Gornișor. The toponym is generally considered to be of Aromanian origin, meaning "small cornel tree", a designation associated with the presence of cornelian cherry trees in the area. On the basis of this etymology, the view has been advanced that the settlement may once have been inhabited by Megleno-Romanians; however, this hypothesis lacks sufficient corroboration, as the inhabitants consistently identify themselves as indigenous to the region. In 1630, Kromni is mentioned in an Ottoman defter as a village comprising 64 Christian households. During the Ottoman period it was administratively subordinated to the kaza of Giannitsa, while ecclesiastically it belonged to the Metropolis of Moglena. Despite its geographical isolation, Kromni displayed notable economic activity and prosperity. The village hosted brickworks, lime kilns, ice-making facilities, and timber-processing installations, reaching a level of technological and productive development comparable to that of Thessaloniki.

Throughout the entire Ottoman period, no permanent Turkish population was established in Kromni. The only Turks officials present were those who arrived from Giannitsa to collect taxes, and even these visits were undertaken with hesitation, owing to the strongly insubordinate reputation of the local population. The inhabitants were Rum, the majority of whom were engaged in logging and pastoralism. They consistently maintained the Orthodox Christian faith and the use of Greek script. At the same time, for practical purposes related to everyday life and agricultural activities, they employed in oral communication a local vernacular, which constituted a linguistic amalgam of Slavic, Greek, and Turkish elements.

During the Greek War of Independence (1821), the village functioned as a refuge for sought-after klephts and outlaws from the wider region. According to local tradition and oral testimonies transmitted across generations, following the Naousa massacre (13–14 April 1822) a substantial number of fighters, along with civilian populations, managed to escape and disperse in groups throughout the surrounding mountainous areas. Two of the principal groups eventually reached Mount Paiko, where they settled in Kromni and were incorporated into the pre-existing population.

In 1840, a Turkish bey settled in the village, an act that was not accepted by the local community. The head of the village, Dimitrios Gontis (or Kontis), accompanied by the interpreter Emmanouil Zinas, traveled to Constantinople, where, through direct appeal to the Sultan, he succeeded in securing an order for the removal of the bey. This development resulted in the transfer of all the land of the settlement to its inhabitants, significantly strengthening communal cohesion and the economic self-sufficiency of Kromni. This distinctive status of local autonomy was further consolidated in the subsequent years. Indicatively, in 1858 the church of Agios Nikolaos was erected, which became a central religious and social point of reference for the village, while also functioning as a school without formal Ottoman authorization.

In the early 20th century, according to statistics by Vasil Kanchov (*Macedonia: Ethnography and Statistics*), Kornishor had a population of 400 Bulgarians and 80 Romani. During the Ilinden Uprising of 1903, the insurgent detachments led by Krastyo Asenov, Apostol Voyvoda, and Ivancho Karasuliyata united in the village. According to Hristo Silyanov, following the Ilinden Uprising, the entire village came under the jurisdiction of the Bulgarian Exarchate in 1904. Due to its steadfast defense of the Bulgarian identity, the village became known as "Little Bulgaria". After 1924, about 260 people emigrated to Bulgaria.
