= Kokkini Rachi =

Mountain in Greece

- Κόκκινη Ράχη
- Location within Greece

Highest point
- Elevation: 1,078 m (3,537 ft)
- Listing: List of mountains in Greece
- Coordinates: 38°11′23″N 20°42′11″E

Geography
- Location: Cephalonia, Greece

Kokkini Rachi (Greek: Κόκκινη Ράχη) is a mountain located in Cephalonia.
