= Voras mountain range =

Mountain range in North Macedonia and Greece

Coordinates: 40.936°N 21.95°E

The Voras Mountain Range or Nidzhe-Kozhuf (Greek: Όρος Βόρας, Macedonian: Ниџе-Koжуф) are a mountain range in the Balkan Peninsula that lies on the border between North Macedonia and Greece.

== Sub-ranges ==
The mountain range is typically divided in three mountain sub-ranges:

- Voras (Greek: Όρος Βόρας) or Nidzhe (Macedonian: Ниџе). Highest Peak is Kaimakchalan at 2,524 m (8,281 ft).
- Kozhuf (Macedonian: Кожуф) or Tzena (Greek: Τζένα). Highest peak is Zelen Breg at 2,176 m (7,139 ft).
- Paiko (Greek: Πάικο) or Payak (Macedonian: Пајак). Highest peak is Gola Chuka at 1,650 m (5,413 ft).

== Geography ==
The mountains form a natural barrier between the Mediterranean and sub-continental climate in the region. The southern slopes drop down rapidly and encircle the Meglen field while the northern slopes gradually fall down towards the rivers Crna and Boshavica.

The mountain range hosts a ski resort at Kozhuf and the hot springs at Loutra Loutrakiou
