= Mount Chelidona =

Coordinates: 38°49′29″N 21°41′09″E

- Location within Greece

- Mount Chelidona (Greece)

Naming
- Native name: Όρος Χελιδώνα (Greek)
- English translation: Mt. Swallow
- Pronunciation: [ˈo.ros çe.liˈðo.na]

Mount Chelidona is a mountain in Central Greece in the regional unit of Evritania. It has a maximum elevation of 1'975 meters. It is connected with the Panaitoliko mountain range in the South, the Kaliakouda East and Tymfristos North, while in the West it ends at the artificial lake of Kremasta.
