= Phayttos =

Town in Pelasgiotis, ancient Thessaly

Coordinates: 39°35′51″N 22°09′25″E

Phayttos (Ancient Greek: Φάυττος) was a town in Pelasgiotis, ancient Thessaly, closely set with Atrax and Larissa. An inscription to Artemis dating from the 3rd century BCE was found here.

Its site in near the modern village of Zarkon.
