= Elati (mountain) =

Mountain in Greece

Elati (Ελάτη)
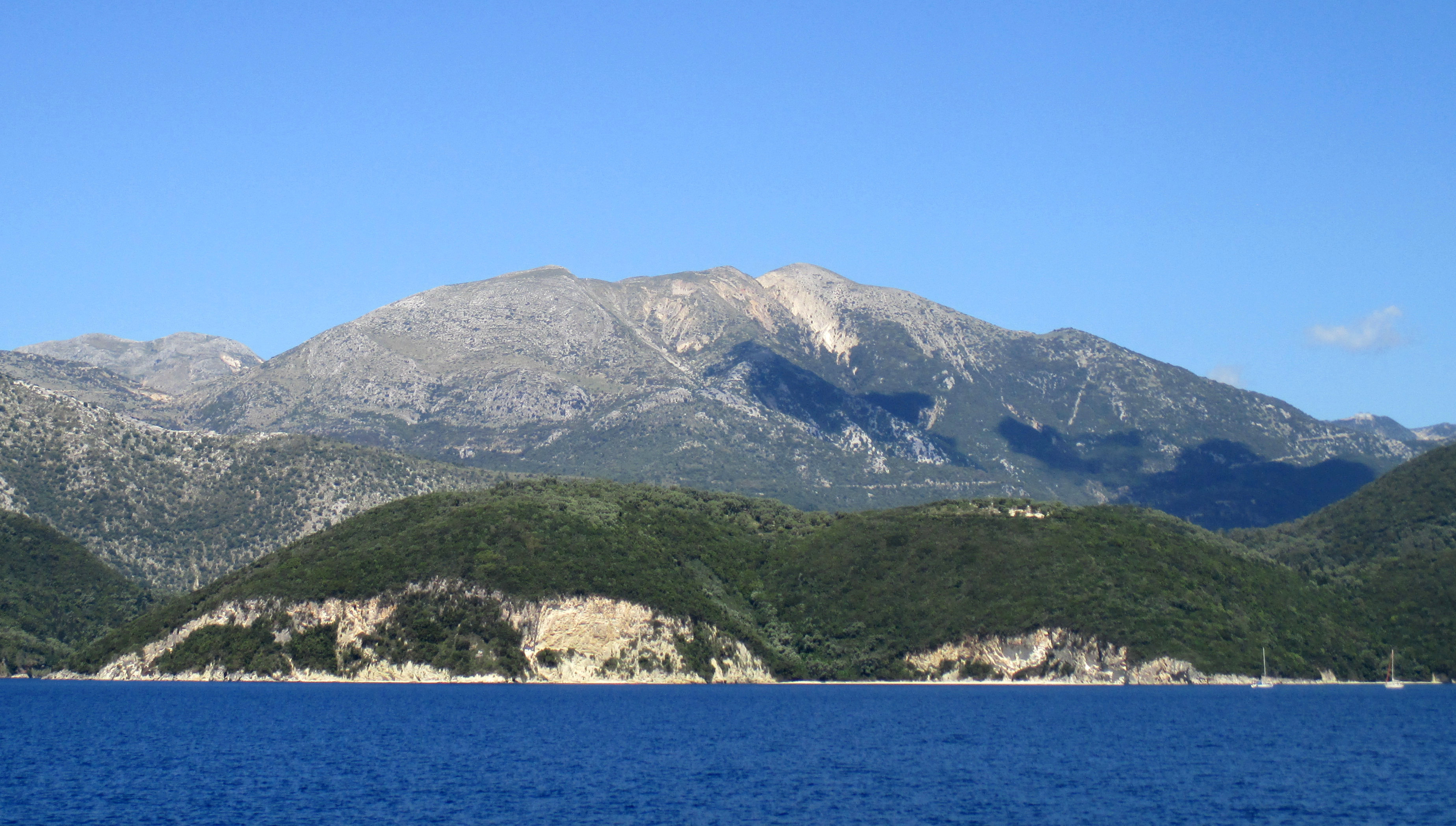

Highest point
- Elevation: 1,182 m (3,878 ft)
- Coordinates: 38°41′56″N 20°37′26″E

Naming
- Pronunciation: Greek: [eˈlati]

Geography
- Location: Lefkada, Greece

Elati (Greek: Ελάτη, meaning "fir tree") is a mountain on the Greek island of Lefkada. It is the island's highest peak.

== Settlements ==
Settlements at or near the mountain are:

- Agios Petros, southwest
- Karya, northwest

== See also ==
- List of mountains in Greece
