= Telethrio =

Mountain range in Greece

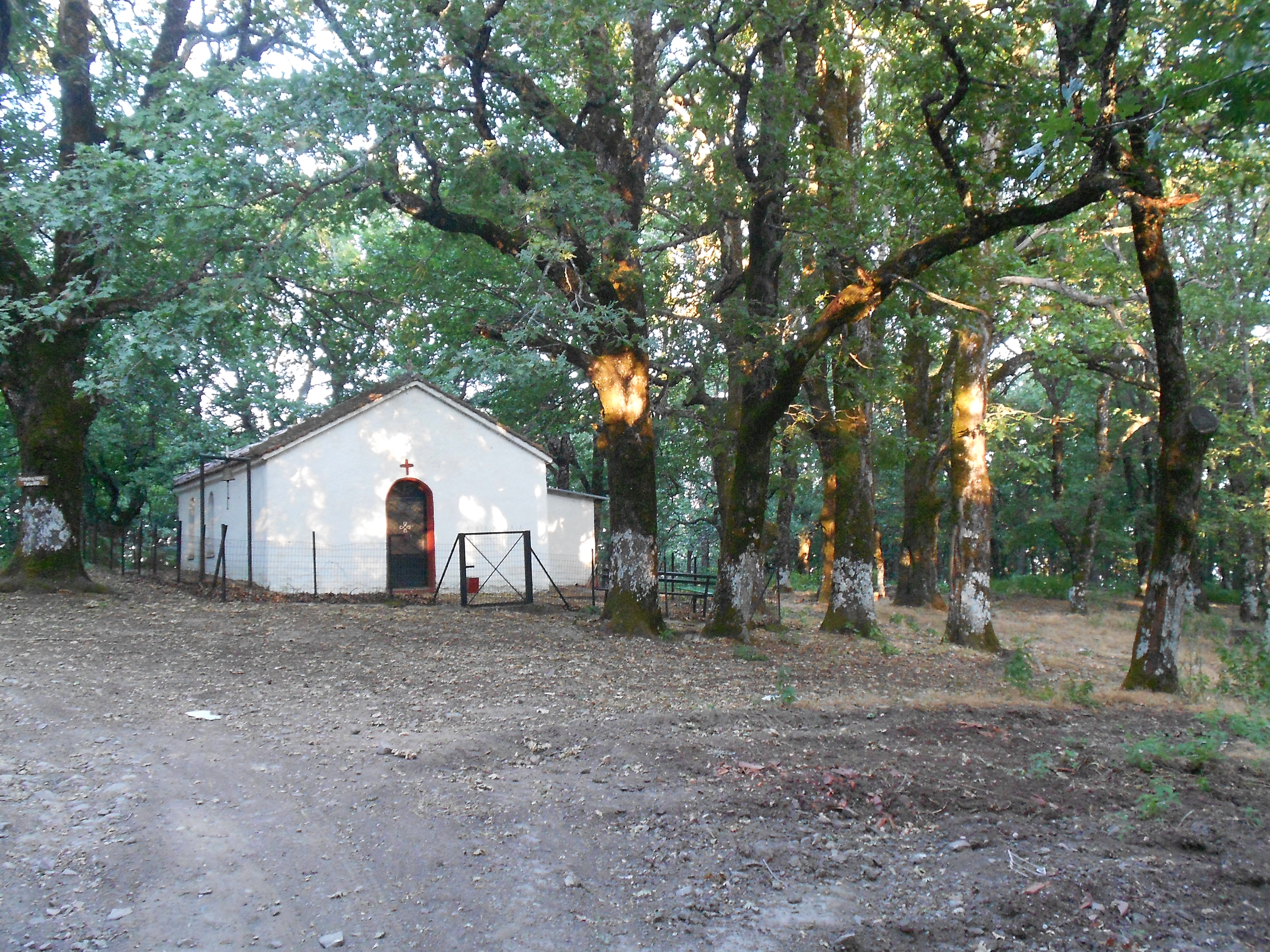
- Chapel at the top of Mount Telethrio.

Highest point
- Elevation: 970 m (3,180 ft)
- Listing: Mountains of Greece
- Coordinates: 38.865°N 23.188°E

Naming
- Pronunciation: Greek: [teˈleθrio]

Geography
- Location within Greece
- Location: Northwest Euboea, Greece

Telethrio (Greek: Τελέθριο, Ancient Greek: Τελέθριος, romanized: Telethrios, Latin: Telethrius) is a small mountain range in the northwestern part of the island of Euboea, Greece. Its maximum elevation is 970 m. It stretches along the west coast of the island, on the North Euboean Gulf, from Aidipsos in the west to Rovies in the east. Its length is about 16 km from east to west. The mountain is forested. There are a few villages on the steep southern slope, including Ilia. Villages on the northern slope are Taxiarchis, Kastaniotissa, Galatsades, Kamatriades and Simia.
