= Mount Paiko =

Mountain in Greece

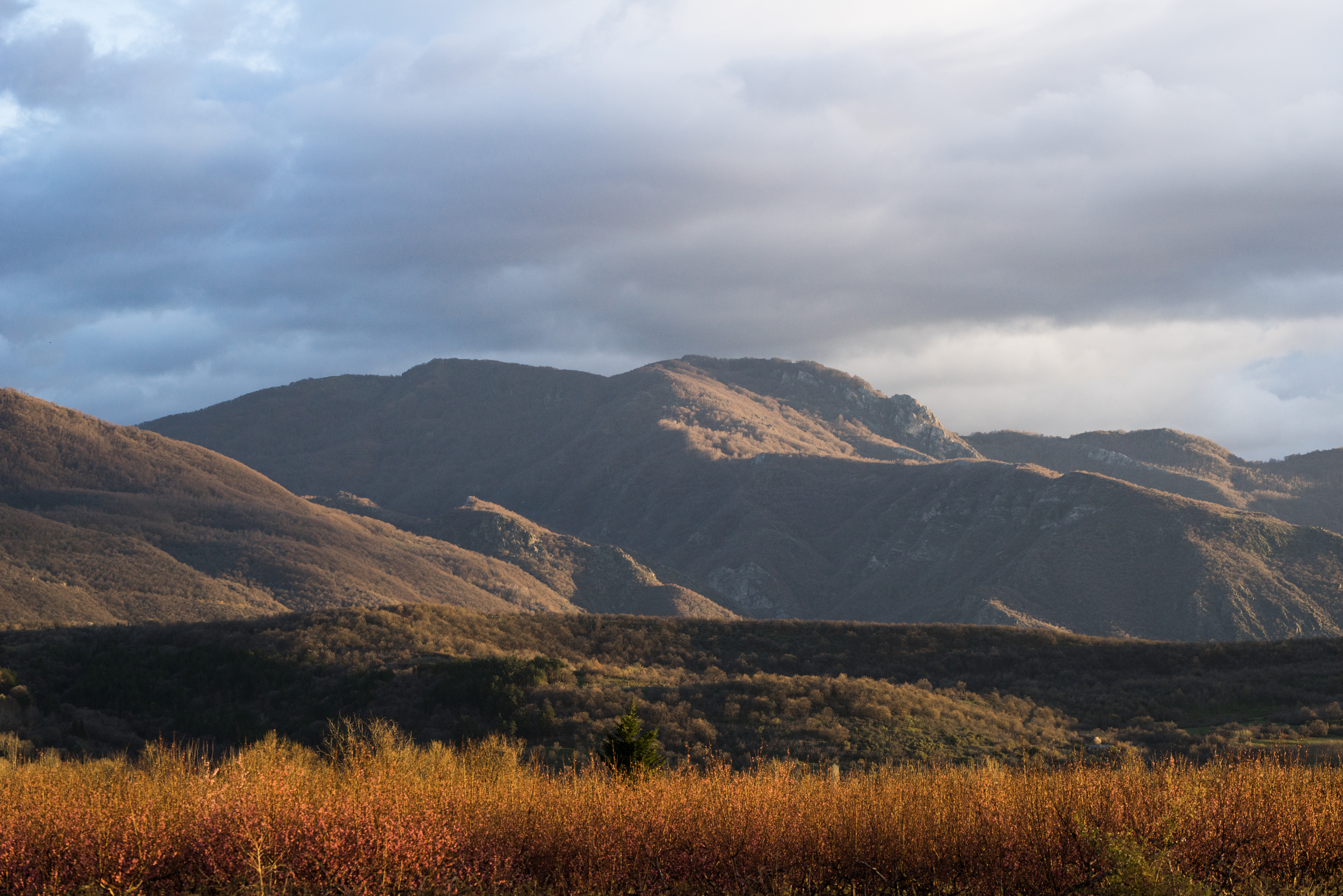
- A view of Mount Paiko

Highest point
- Elevation: 1,650 m (5,410 ft)
- Coordinates: 40°57′11.51″N 22°20′8.98″E

Geography
- Location within Greece
- Location: Greece
- Parent range: Central Macedonia

Mount Paiko (Greek: Πάικο; Bulgarian: Паяк, romanized: Pajak; Megleno Romanian: Paiac or Paic; Aromanian: Paicu) is a low mountain range (surface area: 399 km^{2}) situated along the boundary between the regional units of Pella and Kilkis, in Central Macedonia, Greece. Its highest peak, Gola Tsouka, reaches an elevation of 1,650 metres above sea level. To the west, Mount Paiko is connected to the Voras mountain range, while to the east it borders the Axios River valley. The Paiko massif contains the largest forested area in Greece, characterized by an exceptionally rich and diverse fauna and flora, and is widely known nationwide for its chestnut production.

== Flora-Fauna ==
The flora of Mount Paiko comprises approximately 2,500 recorded plant taxa. The dominant tree species are primarily chestnuts, beeches, pines, oaks, cedars, willows, poplars, and birches. Mount Paiko hosts the largest chestnut forest in Greece, covering an area of approximately 4,500 stremmata (about 450 hectares). More sparsely distributed are plane trees, apple trees, walnut trees, and ivy. The area is also rich in ferns and supports a wide diversity of mushroom species.

The fauna of Mount Paiko consists mainly of wild boar, deer, foxes, roe deer, otters, weasels, hares, martens, forest dormice, edible dormice, and squirrels, while red-breasted flycatchers are also present. Additionally, 60 species of butterflies have been recorded in the area. The aquatic ecosystems of Mount Paiko - including streams, rivers, and waterfalls - support an equally diverse ichthyofauna.

== Villages of Mount Paiko ==
Mount Paiko comprises a group of villages administratively divided between the Regional Units of Pella and Kilkis. All of these settlements have preserved their traditional character, featuring houses constructed in accordance with local architectural styles and materials, a tranquil and largely unspoiled natural environment, and the continued practice and transmission of local customs, social norms, traditions, and folkloric heritage.

=== Kilkis ===
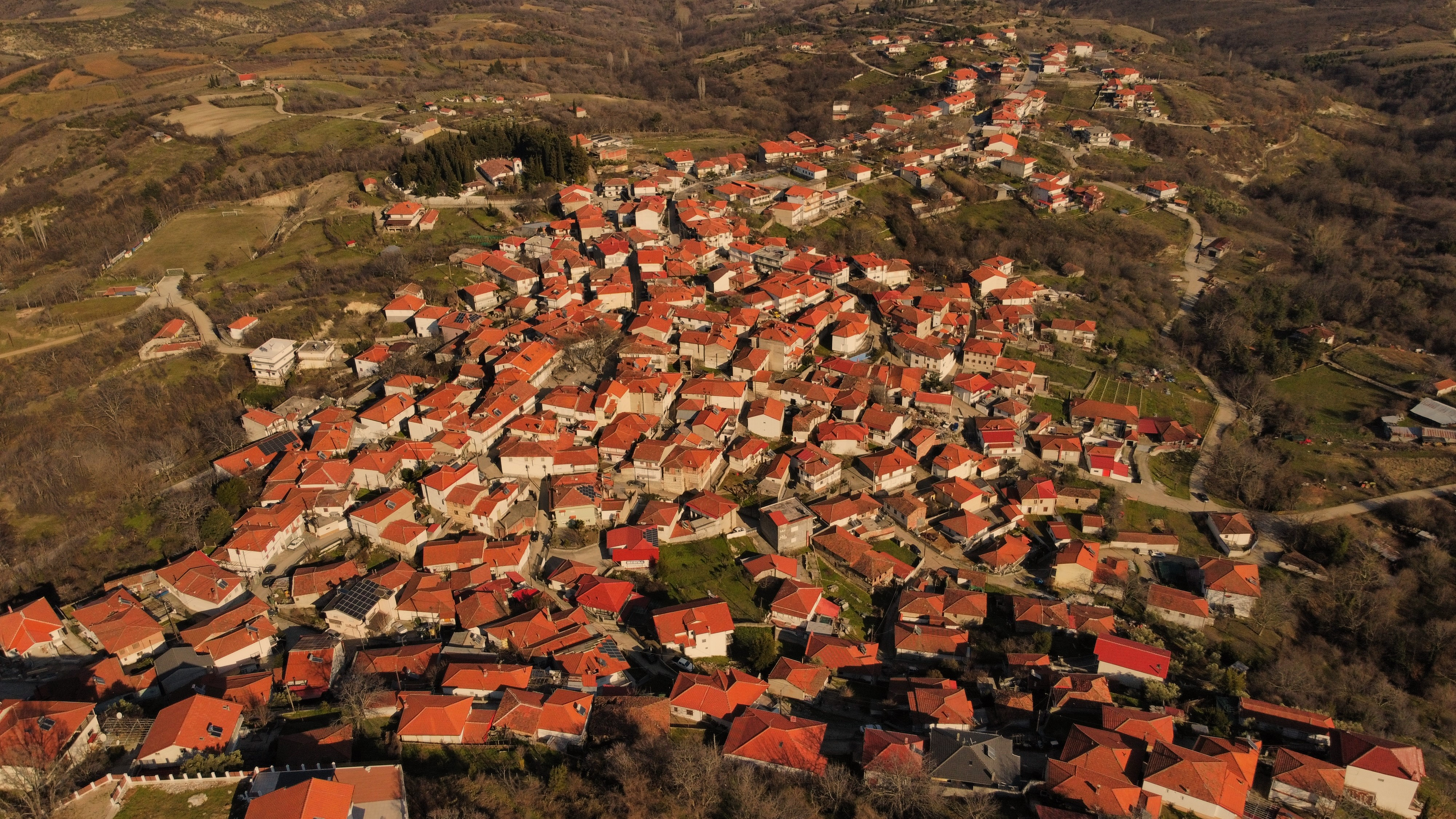
View of Griva

• Griva: Also known as the "lame village", Griva has a long and significant history, having been founded during the Byzantine period. Its inhabitants participated in numerous Greek national liberation struggles during the period of Ottoman rule. The village features houses constructed according to local architectural traditions, an 1800 church, and a landscape characterized by forested slopes. Each year, local folk events, traditional festivities, and celebrations are organized, with particular emphasis on products produced by the village.

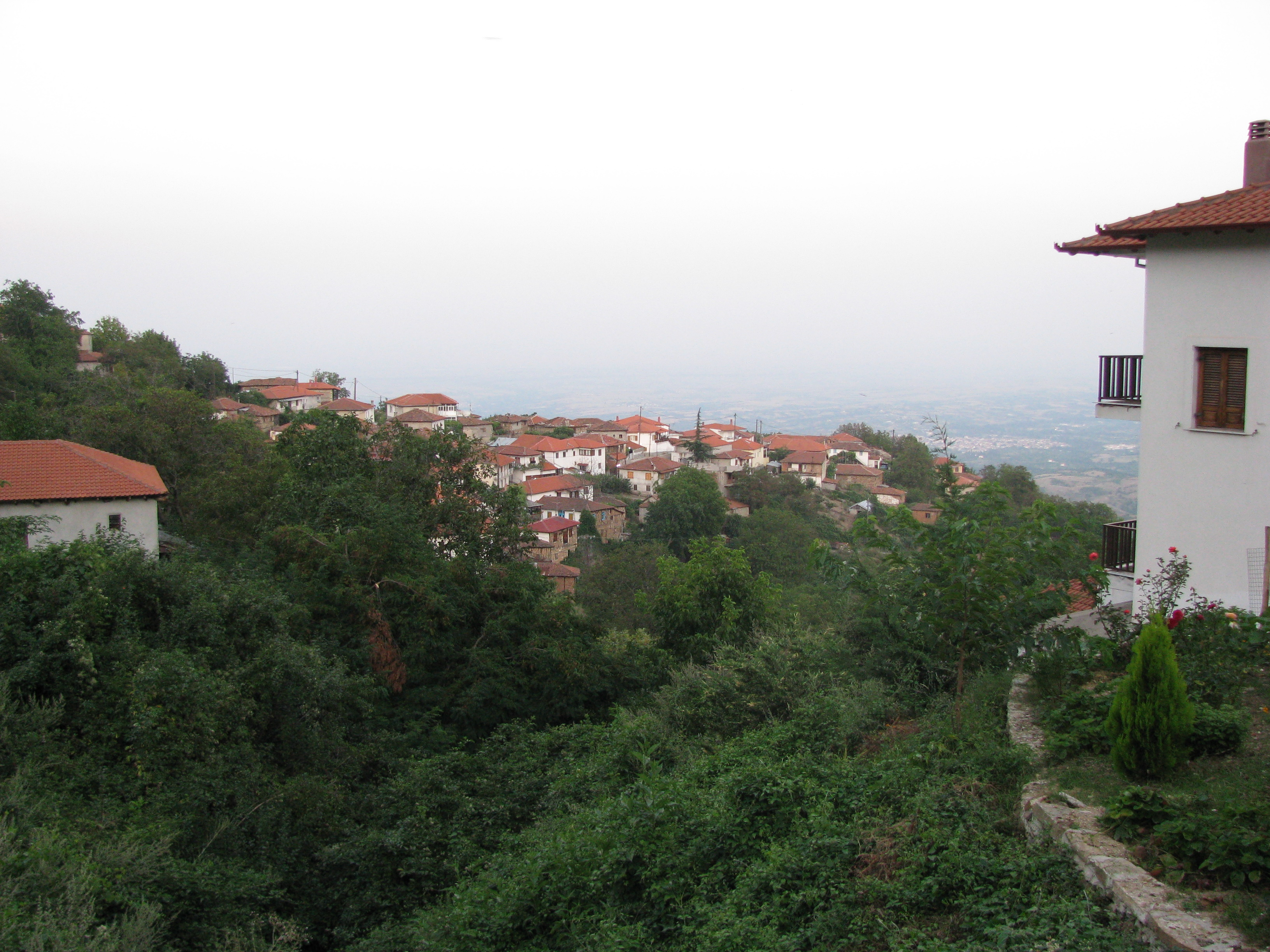
View of Kastaneri

• Pentalofos: A historic village whose wider area has been designated an archaeological site due to the numerous archaeological finds uncovered there. To the northwest lies the Monastery of Saint Nikodemos the Hagiorite, where his skull is preserved. The monastery’s imposing architecture and wall paintings have been officially recognized as works of art.

• Omalo: A village distinguished by rich vegetation and traditional architecture. Its principal landmark is the Holy Monastery of Saint George, a three-aisled basilica dating to the 19th century, which preserves in excellent condition examples of painting and woodcarving from the period of Ottoman rule.

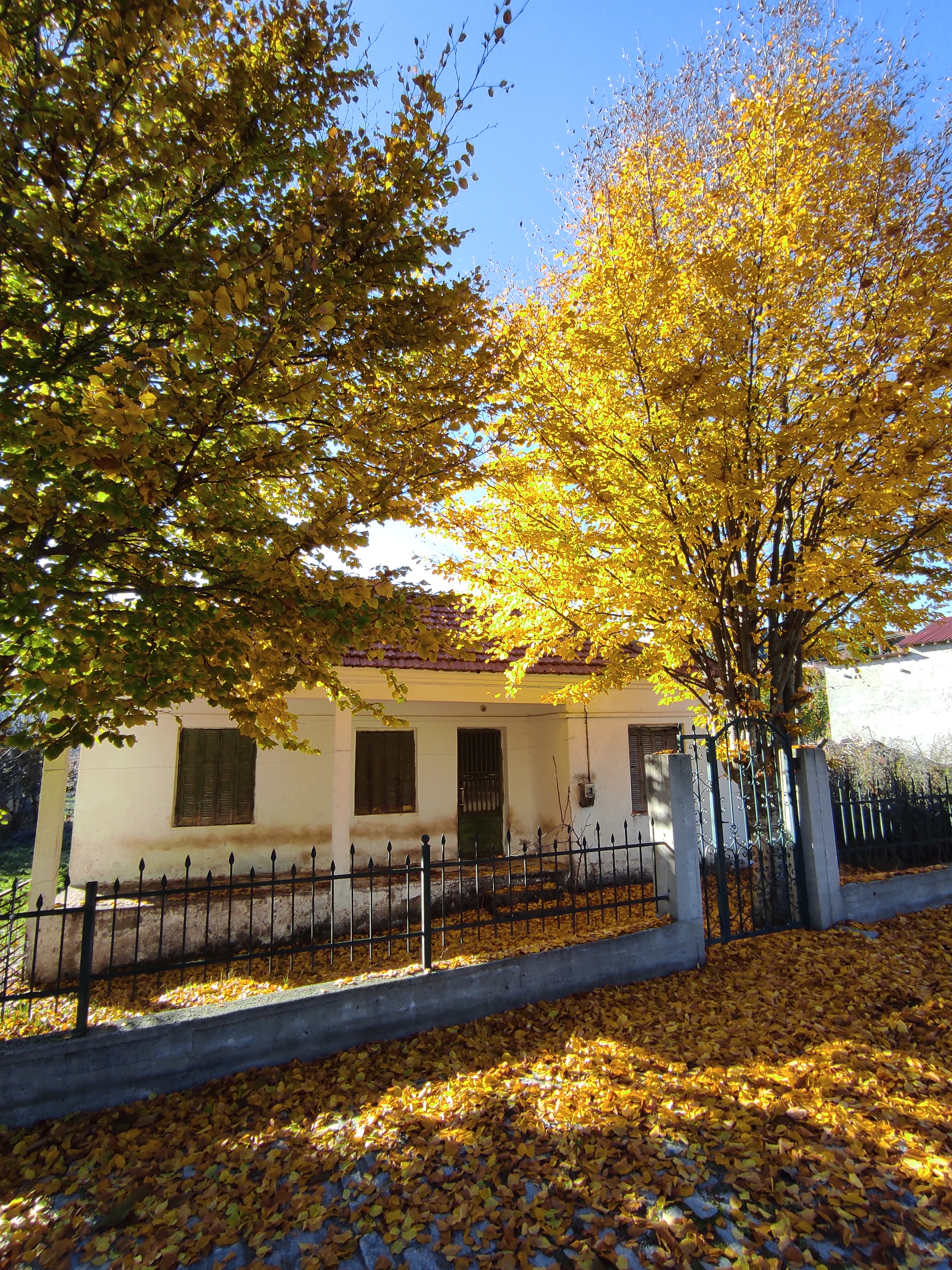
A house in Livadia

• Skra: A historic village with origins dating back to the Byzantine period, whose inhabitants took part in numerous Greek national liberation struggles against Ottoman rule. The village is surrounded by lush vegetation, and its main attractions include the so-called Emerald Lake, the Skra waterfalls, and the World War I – Battle of Skra Museum.

• Kastaneri: A historic hillside village that preserves local traditional architecture, set within an environment of forested hills and abundant water resources. The village is renowned for its picturesque alleys, panoramic views over the Thessaloniki plain, and its chestnut production.

• Karpi: A historic village whose inhabitants participated in numerous Greek national liberation struggles against Ottoman rule. The Church of Saint Athanasios has been designated an archaeological monument. Each year, traditional festivities, local customs, and cultural events are held, including celebrations centered on locally produced goods.

• Livadia: A historic village founded in the 18th century by Vlachs from Epirus who had fled persecution under Ottoman rule. The village is characterized by dense forest vegetation, local traditional architecture, and a way of life rooted in long-established customs and traditions. Its inhabitants took part in several Greek national liberation struggles against the Ottomans. Annual traditional celebrations and cultural events are held, most notably the local festival and the Vlach wedding reenactment.

• Koupa: A historic village that preserves local traditional architecture, including the Church of the Dormition of the Theotokos, constructed in the first half of the 19th century. The village is surrounded by dense vegetation, oak and beech forests, and natural springs with running water.

=== Pella ===
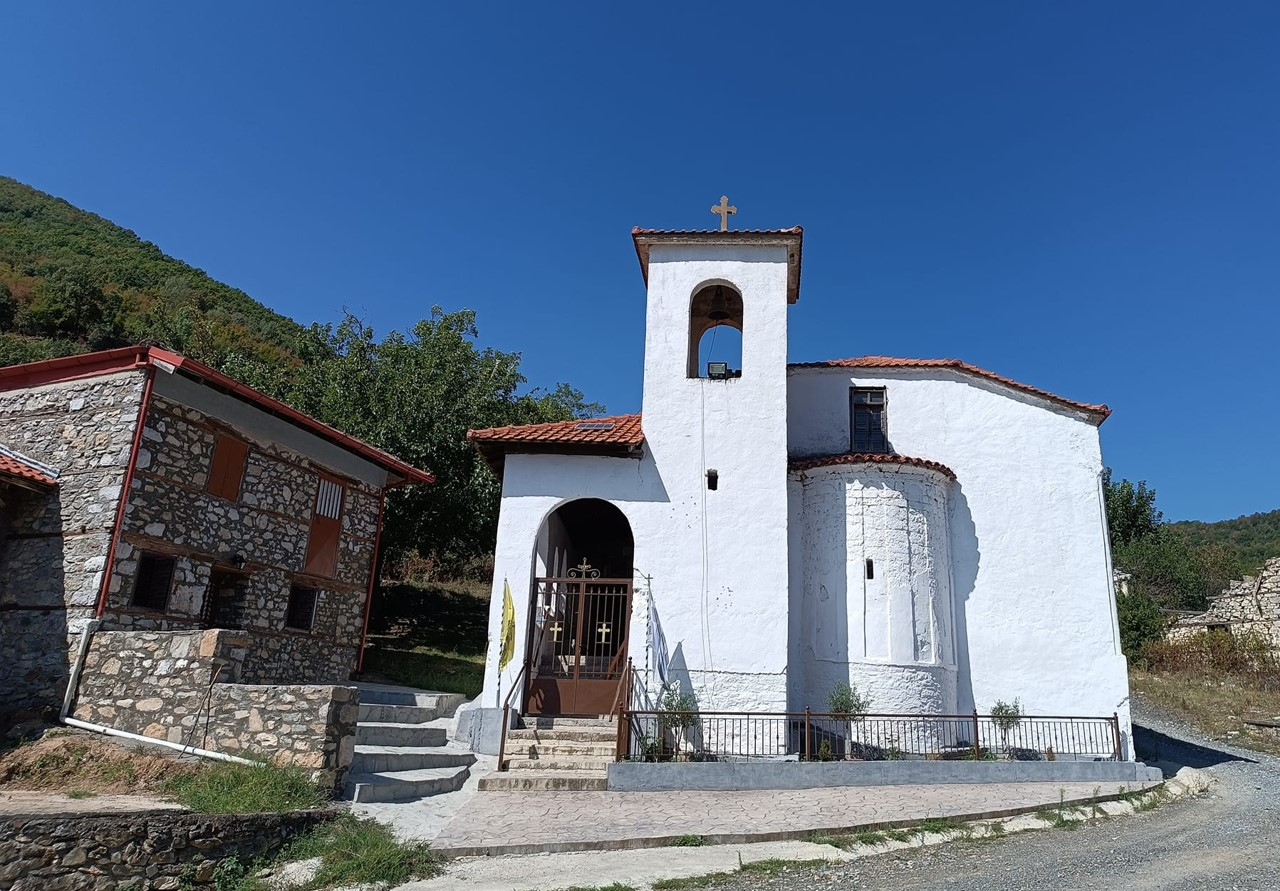
A view of Kromni

• Archangelos: A historic village dating to the Byzantine period, while a Roman cemetery has been identified in the wider area. Notable landmarks include the local traditional architecture and the Monastery of Archangel Michael, founded in the 11th century and designated an officially protected archaeological monument.

• Theodorakeio: A historic village founded during the Byzantine period, whose inhabitants participated in numerous Greek national liberation struggles against Ottoman rule. Today, the village preserves its local traditional architecture, is characterized by rich vegetation and fertile land, and hosts numerous cultural events and traditional festivities each year, with an emphasis on local products.

• Kromni: A historic village traditionally believed to have been founded during the Roman period, built on a steep and rugged slope. It retains its traditional architecture, while additional points of interest include the 19th-century Church of Hagios Nikolaos, the former school building, dense forest vegetation, stone fountains with running water, and nearby caves. Although currently uninhabited, the village is visited annually by former residents, who organize traditional festivities and cultural events.

== Monasteries, Churches and Chapels of Paiko, in the Prefecture of Kilkis ==
The Administrative Head of the Monasteries and Churches of Paionia is the Metropolitan of Goumenissa, Axioupolis and Polykastro Dimitrios.

=== Church of Agios Athanasios ===
The Church of Agios Athanasios is located in Griva.

=== Monastery of Panagia Goumenissa ===
The monastery of Panagia Goumenissa, was the occasion to create the small town of the same name which is the seat of the newly established (since 1991 AD) Diocese of Goumenissi, Axioupolis and Polykastro.

=== Holy Monastery of Saints Raphael, Nicholas and Irene ===
The Holy Monastery of Saints Raphael, Nicholas and Irene is located on a verdant slope of Mount Paikos, at an altitude of 600 m. Overlooking the valley of Axios, in the area of Griva and at a distance of 7 km. from Goumenissa.

=== Chapel of Saints Antonios and Theodoros Grivas ===
Outside Griva and at a distance of about 1.5 km, in a lush oak forest, is the chapel of Agios Antonios, a single-aisled basilica with a dome, which dates from 1901. The church was rebuilt in 1993.

=== Holy Monastery (convent) of Saint Nicodemus of Mount Athos ===
The Holy Monastery of Saint Nicodemus of Mount Athos is located in Central Macedonia and Paeonia of Kilkis. It is built on the eastern slopes of Mount Paiko at an altitude of 700 meters and west of the river Axios. It is 70 km NW. from Thessaloniki, 53 km W. from Kilkis and 22 km W.-ND. from Polykastro. To the east is Goumenissa, to the southeast is Pentalofos and to the northeast is Griva. The monastery is manly and was founded in 1981. It is part of the Holy Monastery of Simon Petra of Mount Athos and ecclesiastically belongs to the Diocese of Goumenissa, Axioupolis and Polykastro.

== Geography ==
Morphologically, Paiko is a curvy extension to the north east of the adjacent Voras mountain range. Together they surround the plain of Aridea. East and south of Paiko are the plains of the Vardar (Axios) river and the plains of Giannitsa respectively.

The highest peaks are Skra (1,097 m (3,599 ft)), Tsouma (1,219 m (3,999 ft)), Vertopia (1,490 m (4,890 ft)), Pirgos (1,494 m (4,902 ft)), Kadasti (1,607 m (5,272 ft)) and Ghola Tsouka (1,650 m (5,410 ft)). Pirgos, Vertopia and Kadasti surround a large plateau (formerly native grassland) at altitude around 1,200 m (3,900 ft). Most areas of the plateau are residential or cultivated.

== Geology ==
Paiko is composed of igneous and sedimentary rocks, mainly carbonatite and ophiolite. Sedimentary rocks are found mostly in the north eastern areas.

== Hydrology ==
Skra lake and waterfalls

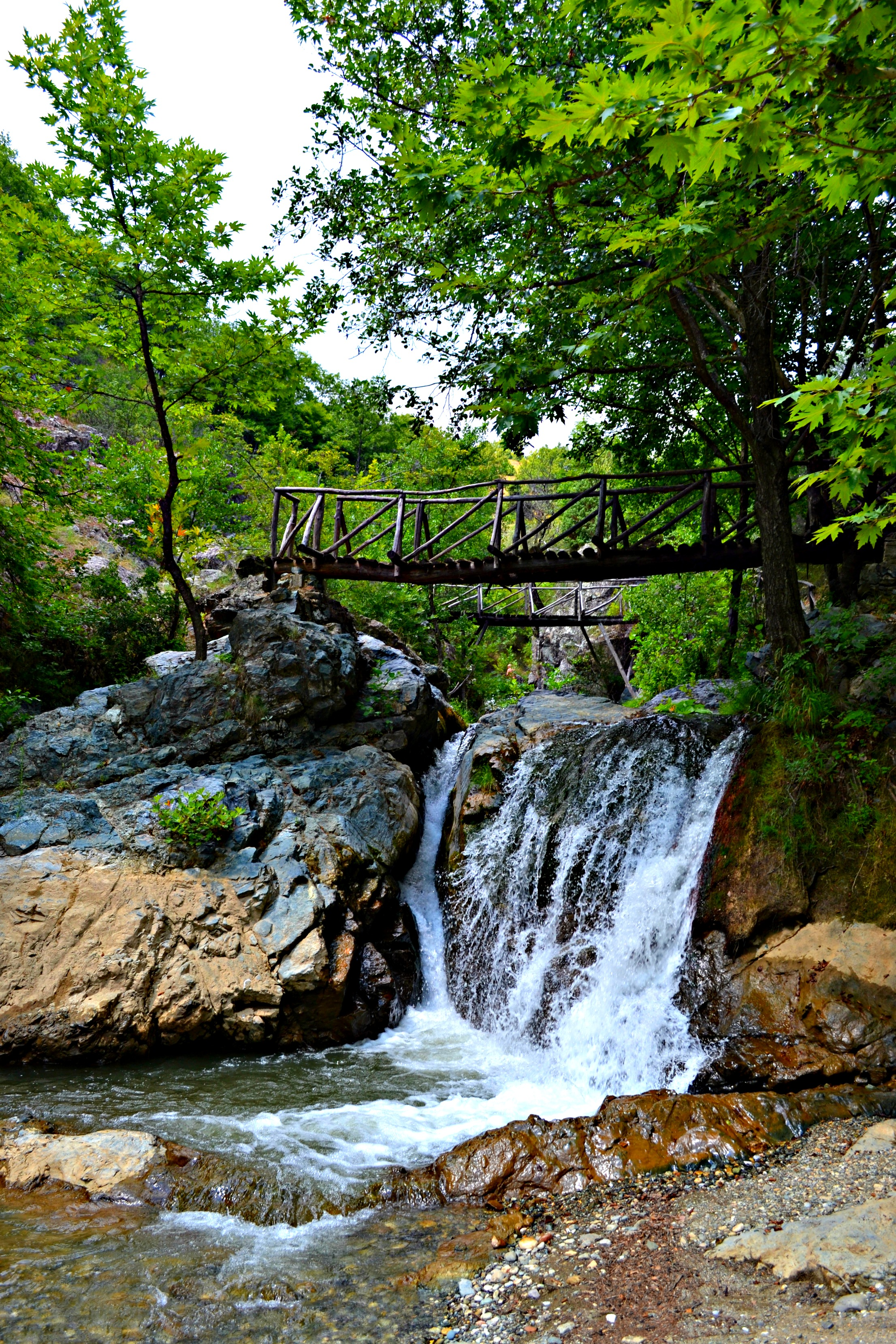
Platanus forest

Paiko is rich in surface and underground bodies of water, often potable. Springs exist at the foothills and small wetlands, connected by several streams, can be found at high altitudes. Two waterfalls and a lagoon of blue-green waters are located near the Skra peak.

East of the mountain is a small artificial lake (Lake Metalleiou) 35 m deep and of circumference around 4 km.

== Life ==
=== Flora and Funga ===
The vegetation of Paiko is considered lush. Large trees include:

- pine
- Quercus (oak) (especially Quercus pubescens and Quercus frainetto)
- plane (especially Platanus orientalis)
- alder (especially Alnus glutinosa)
- beech
- walnut
- chestnut
- cedrus
- willow
- populus
- apple trees

Smaller plants and fungi include:

- Species of grass
- Shrubs such as wild strawberries
- Mushrooms - a rare species (Daedaleopsis septentrionalis) known only in northern areas was discovered in 2009.
- Fern
- Flowers like Primula vulgaris, Scilla bifolia, Viola odorata, Galanthus elwesii and Crocus veluchensis

=== Fauna ===
Beside mammals (deer, rabbits) and vultures, notable animals include:

- Amphibians such as the great crested newt and the yellow-bellied toad.
- Reptiles such as Hermann's tortoise.
- The fish Sabanejewia aurata and the rare Mediterranean barbel.
- Lepidoptera (57 species have been identified) such as the large copper butterfly and the Callimorpha quadripunctata moth.

At Lake Metalleiou humans have introduced trout. Fishing is allowed under controlled conditions.

== See also ==
- List of mountains in Greece
- Battle of Skra-di-Legen
