= Kalon Oros (Cephalonia) =

Mountain in Greece

Coordinates: 38°20′N 20°35′E

Kalon Oros is one of the mountains in the North West of Cephalonia Height 901m
