= Zarko =

Zarko Ζάρκο
- Community
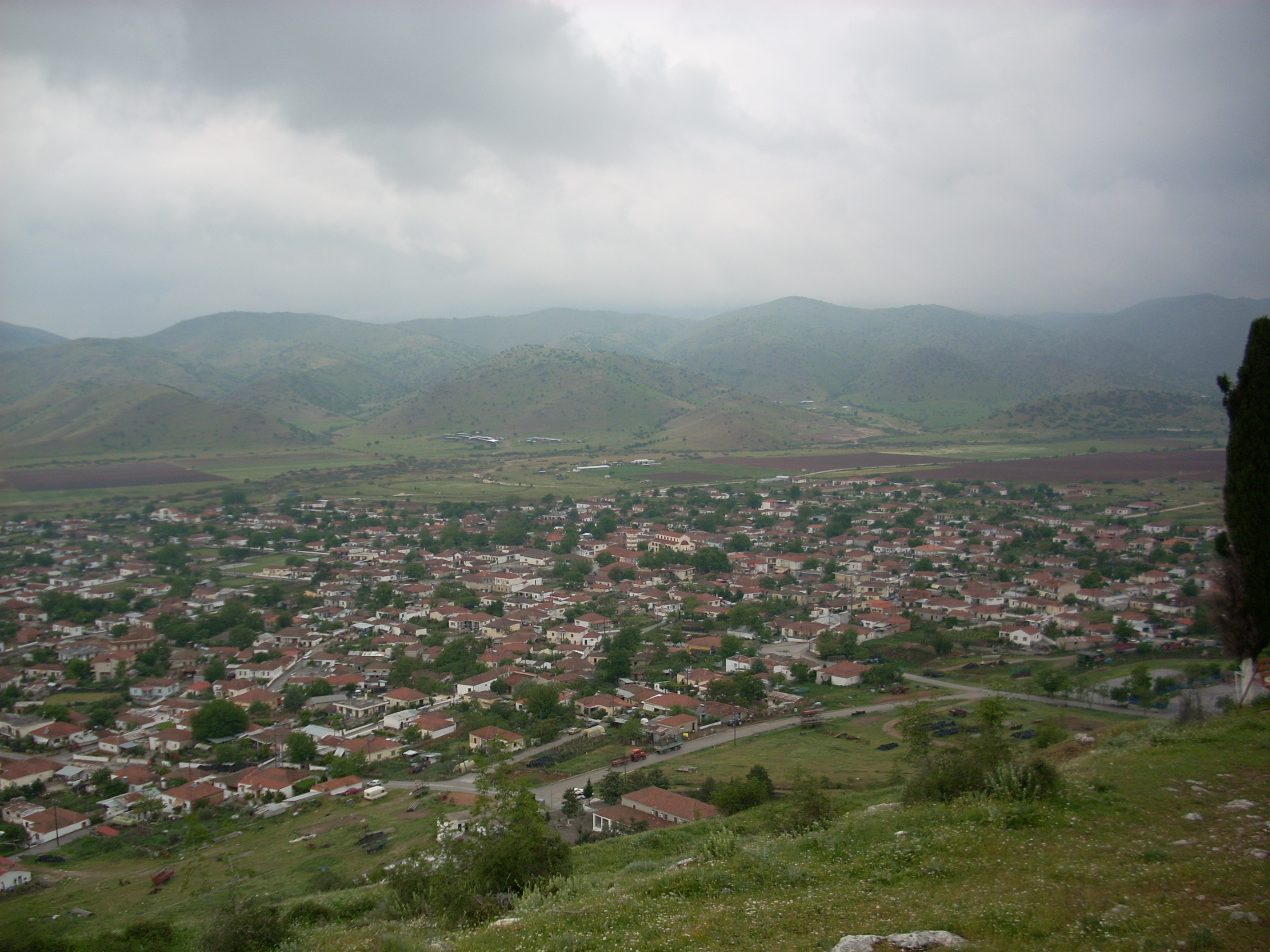

- Location within Greece
- Coordinates: 39°37′N 22°8′E
- Country: Greece
- Administrative region: Thessaly
- Regional unit: Trikala
- Municipality: Farkadona
- Municipal unit: Farkadona

Population (2021)
  - Community: 957
- Time zone: UTC+2 (EET)
  - Summer (DST): UTC+3 (EEST)
- Vehicle registration: ΤΚ

Zarko (Greek: Ζάρκο, also: Zarkos) is a village in the Farkadona municipality, Trikala regional unit, Greece. Zarko had a population of 957 in 2021. Zarko is located on the edge of the Thessalian Plain, 5 km east of Farkadona proper, and 25 km west of Larissa.

== Population ==
| Year | Population |
|---|---|
| 1981 | 1,825 |
| 1991 | 1,711 |
| 2001 | 1,498 |
| 2011 | 1,247 |
| 2021 | 957 |

== History ==
Zarko's initial name was Fayttos (Φαϋττός), however still it is not clear at which exactly point the name changed to Zarko. The name Fayttos reflects the ancient town of Phayttos that was located within the bounds of the town. There is also much speculation regarding the source of the name Zarko. Some people say that many roe deer (zarkadia, Greek: ζαρκάδια) used to live around the area, while others believe that this is actually the name (Zarko) of a Serbian leader who ruled the area in the 14th century.

The fact is that it all started thousands of years ago as archaeological excavations in the wider area brought up buildings of a prehistoric settlement, probably of around 6500-5800 BC.

During the Turkish occupation years Zarko was one of the main centres of the wider Thessaly area. It had more than 5000 inhabitants and there was a Greek, a Turkish and a Jewish area. Zarko's people were mainly working in the fields producing cotton and they were quite capable of producing fabrics of the highest quality; in the late 19th century the 'Zarkina pania' (cotton fabrics of Zarko) were well known in the area.

Along with most of Thessaly, Zarko joined Greece in 1881. Nowadays you can still see the Turkish and the Greek forts that were built in the 19th century in order to define the borders between the two countries. In 1886, not far from the village, the battle of Koutras took place. The outcome of the battle was defeat to the Greek forces by the Turks.

In the mid 1950s Zarko was the very first village in the area to start modernising the traditional way of agriculture. It introduced the first ‘fabric made water-pipes’ that were used in order to water the cotton fields, as well as bringing in the area the first tractors.

A special note needs to be done regarding the 12th century St. John’s monastery which is located around 2 kilometres north of Zarkos. Deserted for many years it is now reconstructed and occupied with nuns.

== See also ==
- List of settlements in the Trikala regional unit
