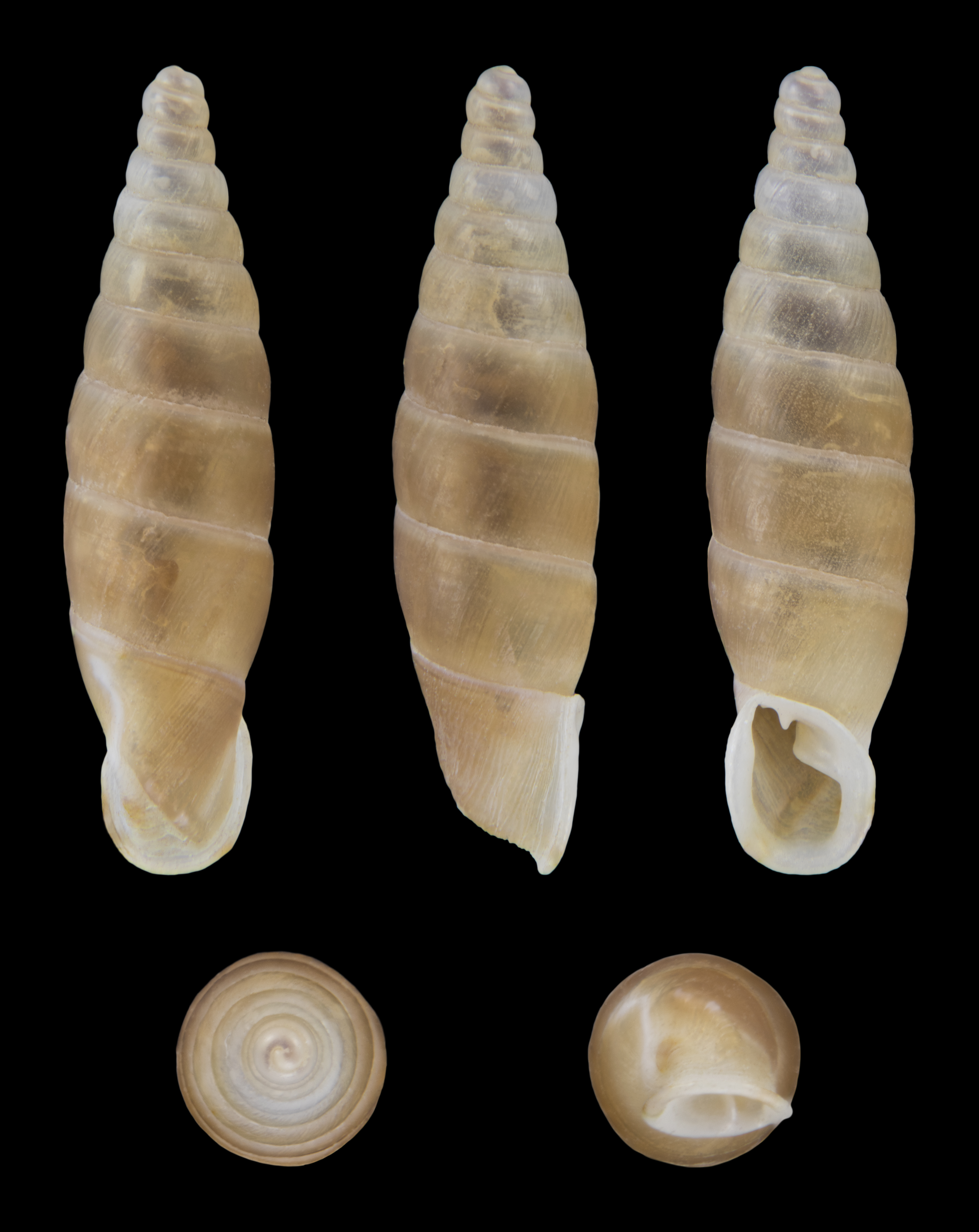
- Isabellaria lophauchena (Sturany, 1894)

Scientific classification
- Domain: Eukaryota
- Kingdom: Animalia
- Phylum: Mollusca
- Class: Gastropoda
- Order: Stylommatophora
- Family: Clausiliidae
- Genus: Isabellaria; Vest, 1867

Synonyms
- Sericata Boettger, 1878

= Isabellaria =

Genus of molluscs

Isabellaria is a genus of gastropods belonging to the family Clausiliidae.

The species of this genus are found in Mediterranean.

Species:

- Isabellaria abyssoclista (O.Boettger, 1883)
- Isabellaria almae (O.Boettger, 1889)
- Isabellaria bathyclista (O.Boettger, 1879)
- Isabellaria clandestina (Rossmässler, 1857)
- Isabellaria isabellina (L.Pfeiffer, 1842)
- Isabellaria lutracana (H.Nordsieck, 1977)
- Isabellaria parnassia (O.Boettger, 1888)
- Isabellaria perplana (O.Boettger, 1877)
- Isabellaria regina H.Nordsieck, 1972
- Isabellaria riedeli R.A.Brandt, 1961
- Isabellaria saxicola (L.Pfeiffer, 1848)
- Isabellaria sericata (L.Pfeiffer, 1850)
- Isabellaria thermopylarum (L.Pfeiffer, 1850)
