= Koulochera =

Mountain in Greece

Coordinates: 36°50′N 23°00′E

Koulochera (Greek: Κουλοχέρα) is a mountain in southeastern Laconia, Greece. Its elevation is 1,125 m.
