= Grizano =

Grizano Γριζάνο
- Community
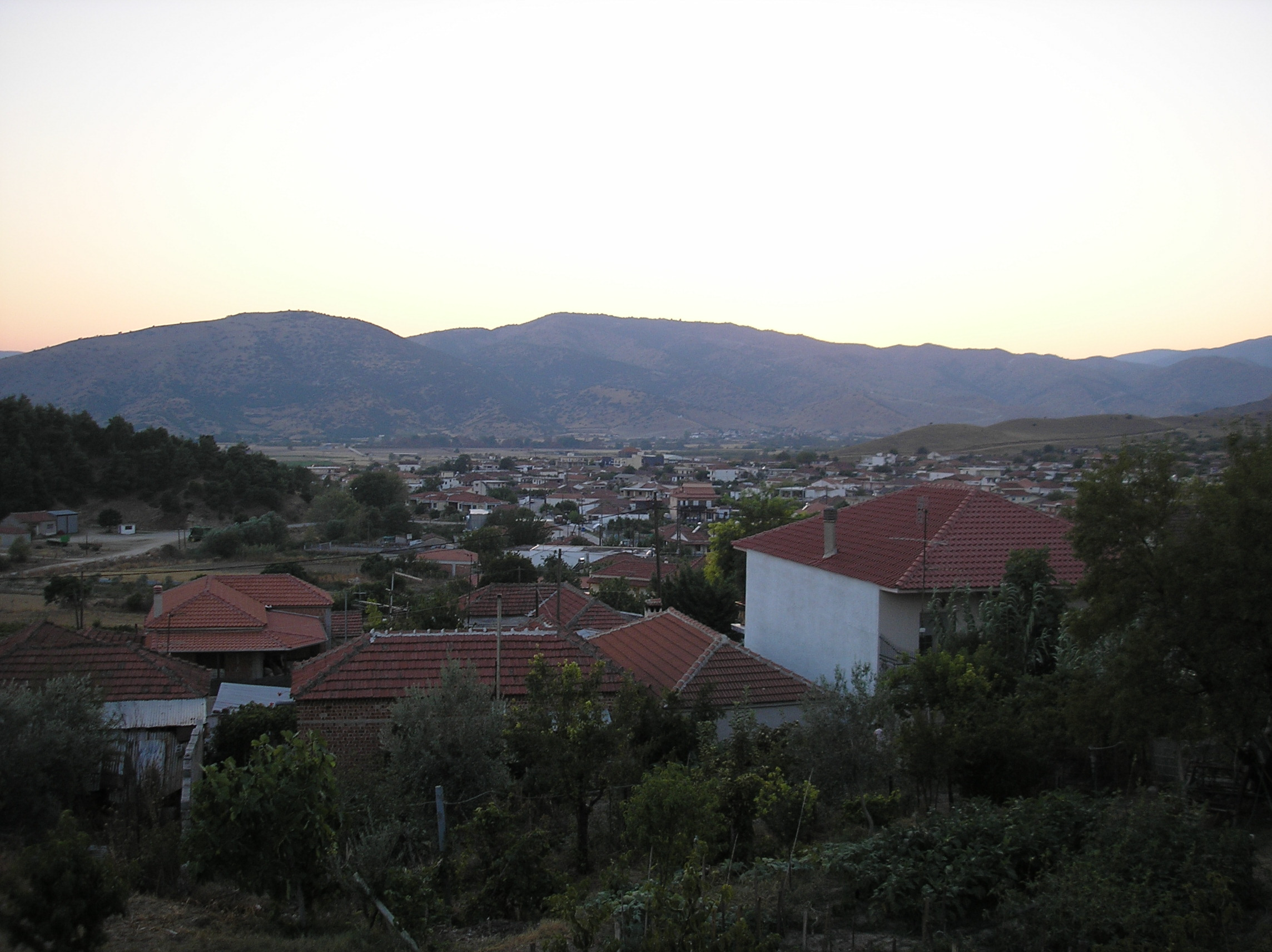

- Location within Greece
- Coordinates: 39°37′54″N 022°03′19″E
- Country: Greece
- Administrative region: Thessaly
- Regional unit: Trikala
- Municipality: Farkadona
- Municipal unit: Farkadona
- Elevation: 140 m (460 ft)

Population (2021)
  - Community: 1,192
- Time zone: UTC+2 (EET)
  - Summer (DST): UTC+3 (EEST)
- Vehicle registration: ΤΚ
- Elevation and coordinates

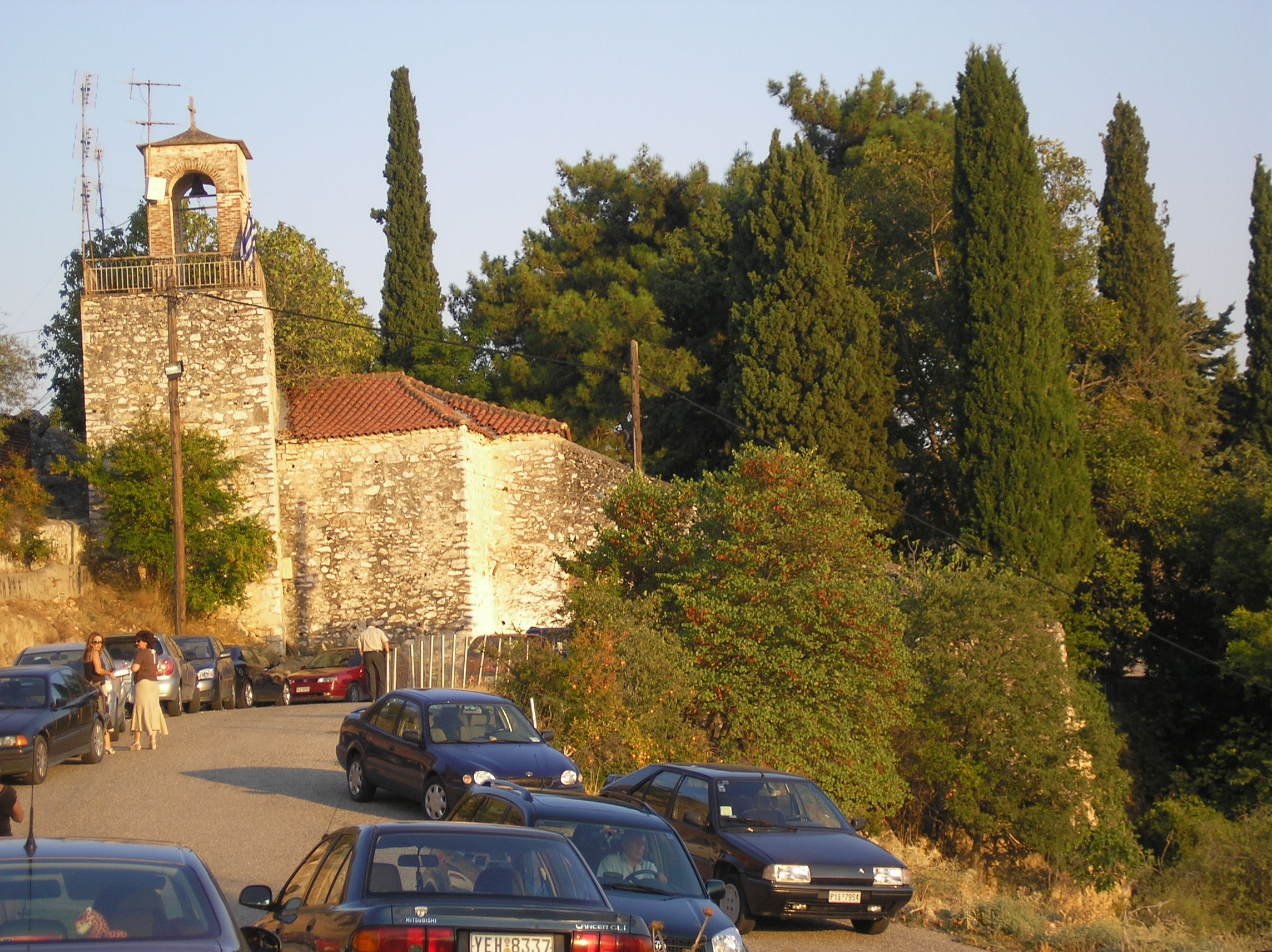
St. Dimitrios Monastery in Grizano

Grizano (Greek: Γριζάνο) is a village in the Trikala regional unit, Greece, part of the Farkadona municipality. In 2021 its population was 1,192. Grizano is located on the edge of the Thessalian Plain, 4 km (2.5 mi) north of Farkadona town, and 25 km (16 mi) east of the city of Trikala. With most of Thessaly, it joined Greece in 1881.

== Population ==
Year	Population
1981	1,453
1991	1,601
2001	1,548
2011	1,290
2021	1,192

== History ==
One of the largest inland castles built in Greece is the castle of Grizano, that is located on a hill north east of the village. The castle was built during the Middle Ages but the exact date is unknown.

== See also ==
- List of settlements in the Trikala regional unit
