= Carinigera =

Scientific classification
- Kingdom: Animalia
- Phylum: Mollusca
- Class: Gastropoda
- Order: Stylommatophora
- Family: Clausiliidae
- Genus: Carinigera; Möllendorff, 1873

Genus of land snails

Carinigera is a genus of gastropods belonging to the family Clausiliidae.

The species of this genus are found in Mediterranean.

Species:

- Carinigera albicosta (O.Boettger, 1877)
- Carinigera buresi (A.J.Wagner, 1928)
- Carinigera calabacensis (Westerlund, 1892)
- Carinigera chelidromia (O.Boettger, 1889)
- Carinigera dextrorsa (O.Boettger, 1877)
- Carinigera drenovoensis (R.A.Brandt, 1961)
- Carinigera eximia (Möllendorff, 1873)
- Carinigera leucorhaphe (O.Boettger, 1878)
- Carinigera liebegottae (H.Nordsieck, 1984)
- Carinigera lophauchena (Sturany, 1894)
- Carinigera octava R.A.Brandt, 1962
- Carinigera pellucida Dedov & Neubert, 2002
- Carinigera praecipua (Sajó, 1968)
- Carinigera praestans (Westerlund, 1893)
- Carinigera schuetti R.A.Brandt, 1962
- Carinigera septima R.A.Brandt, 1962
- Carinigera stussineri (O.Boettger, 1885)
- Carinigera superba H.Nordsieck, 1977
- Carinigera tantilla (R.A.Brandt, 1962)
- Carinigera thessalonica (H.Nordsieck, 1972)
- Carinigera torifera (O.Boettger, 1885)
