= Achladochori, Trikala =

Achladochori Αχλαδοχώρι
- Community
- Location within Greece
- Coordinates: 39°38′15″N 22°01′18″E
- Country: Greece
- Administrative region: Thessaly
- Regional unit: Trikala
- Municipality: Pyli
- Municipal unit: Aithikes

Population (2021)
  - Community: 82
- Time zone: UTC+2 (EET)
  - Summer (DST): UTC+3 (EEST)

Achladochori (Greek: Αχλαδοχώρι) is a village in the regional unit of Trikala in Thessaly, Greece. It forms part of the municipal unit of Farkadona, in the municipality of the same name. According to the 2021 census, its population was 82.

The village features a unique 13th-century church dedicated to the Dormition of the Theotokos. The church has a cross shaped roof along with a narthex at the west wall.
