= Farkadona =

Farkadona Φαρκαδόνα
- Municipality
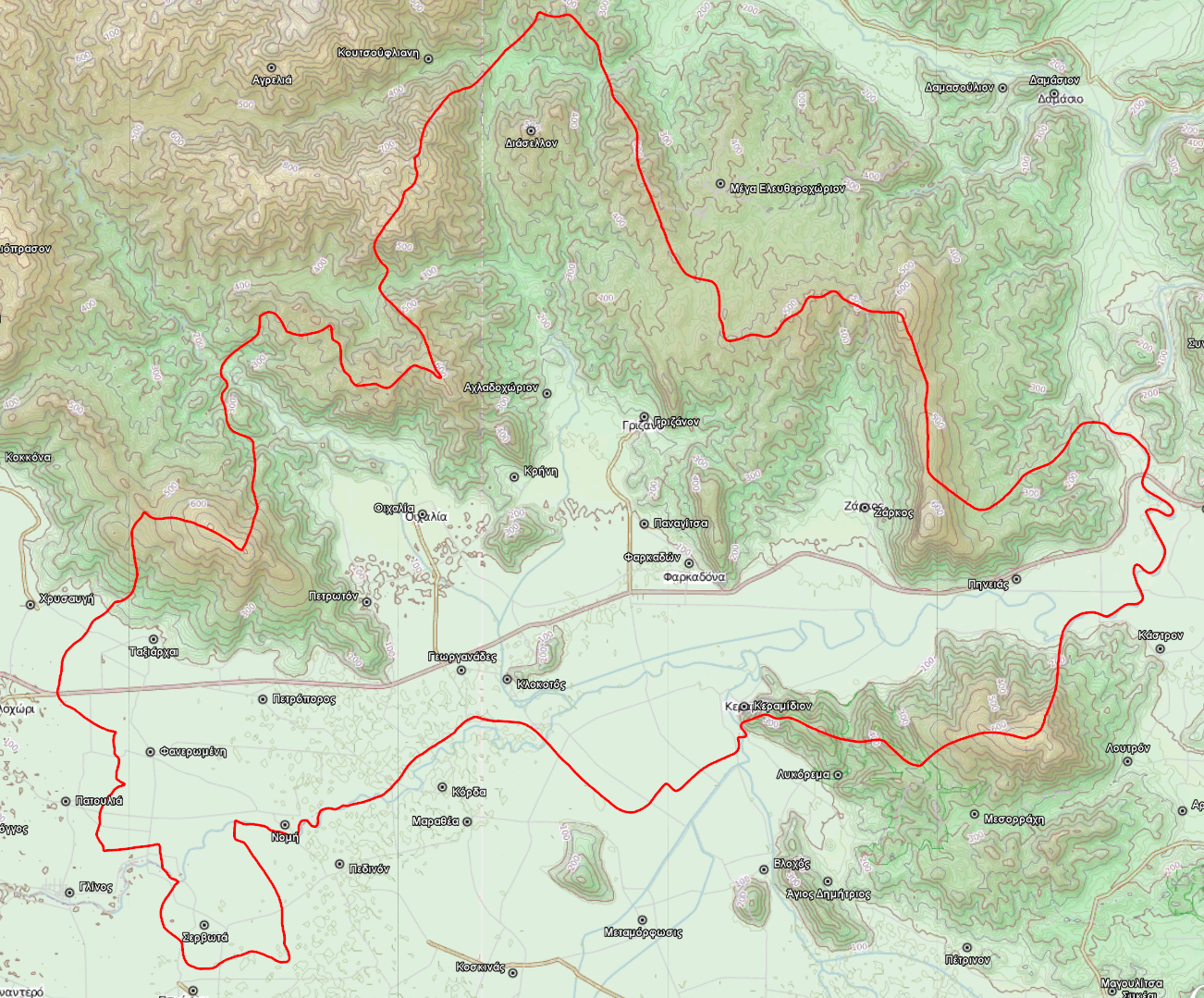

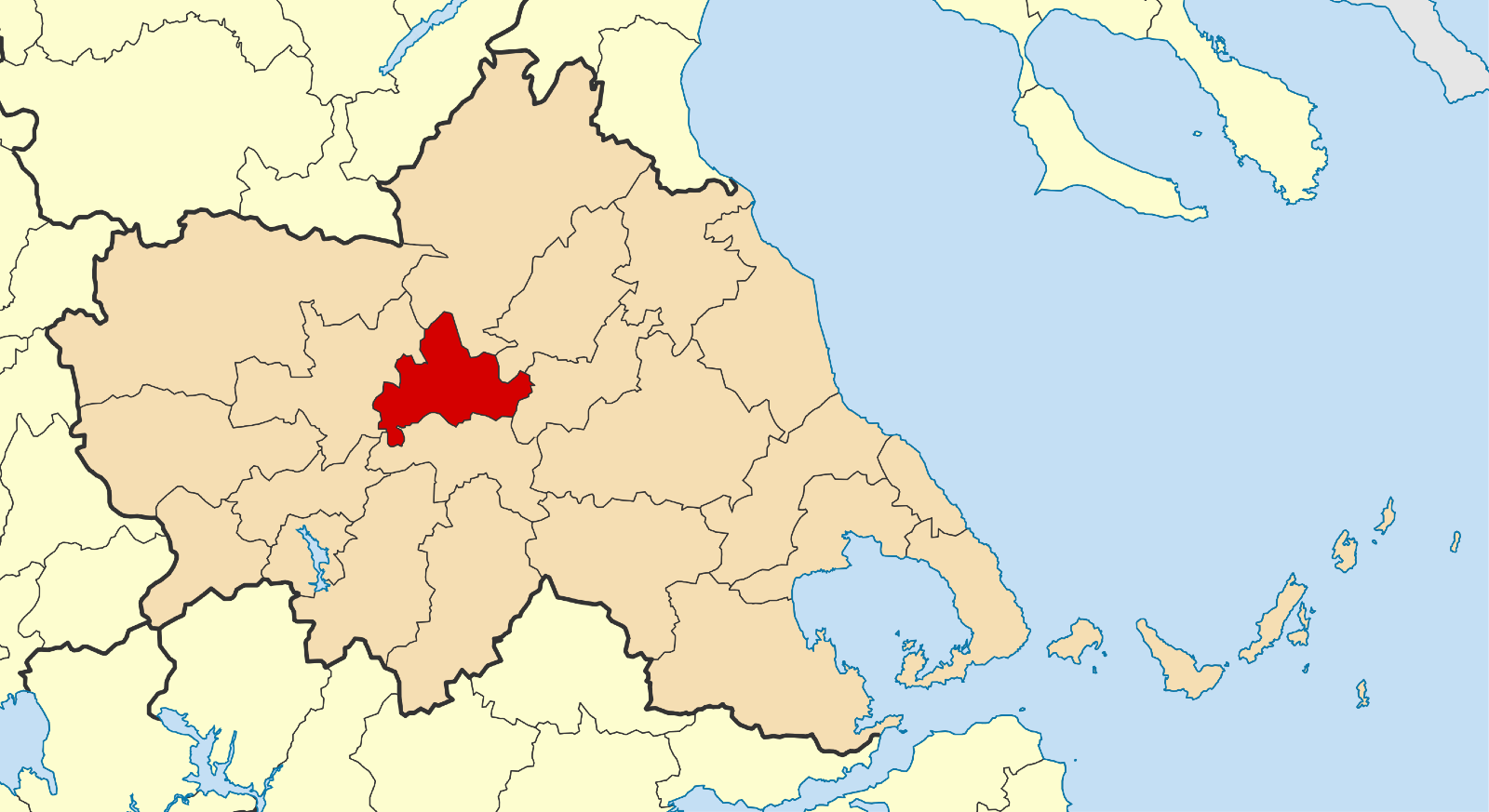

- Location within Greece
- Coordinates: 39°35′N 22°04′E
- Country: Greece
- Administrative region: Thessaly
- Regional unit: Trikala

Area
  - Municipality: 368.67 km^{2} (142.34 sq mi)
  - Municipal unit: 219.78 km^{2} (84.86 sq mi)
- Elevation: 248 m (814 ft)

Population (2021)
  - Municipality: 11,350
  - Density: 30.79/km^{2} (79.74/sq mi)
  - Municipal unit: 5,002
  - Municipal unit density: 22.76/km^{2} (58.95/sq mi)
  - Community: 1,829
- Time zone: UTC+2 (EET)
  - Summer (DST): UTC+3 (EEST)
- Vehicle registration: ΤΚ
- Website: www.e-farkadona.gov.gr

Farkadona (Greek: Φαρκαδόνα, romanized: Farkadóna, [farkaˈðona]; before 1955: Τσιότι, Tsióti, [ˈt͡sjo.ti]) is a municipality in the southeastern Trikala regional unit, part of Thessaly in Greece. It is located about halfway between the cities Larissa to the east, and Trikala to the west, at about 30 km from both. It is situated in the Thessalian Plain, near the river Pineios. Farkadona is on the Greek National Road 6 (Larissa - Trikala - Ioannina - Igoumenitsa).

== Municipality ==
The municipality Farkadona was formed at the 2011 local government reform by the merger of the following 3 former municipalities, that became municipal units:

- Farkadona
- Oichalia
- Pelinnaioi

The municipality has an area of 368.674 km^{2}, the municipal unit 219.776 km^{2}.

=== Subdivisions ===
The municipal unit of Farkadona is divided into the following communities:

- Achladochori
- Grizano
- Diasello
- Farkadona
- Keramidi
- Panagitsa
- Pineias
- Zarko

== Population ==
Year	Town	Municipal unit	Municipality
1981	2,117	-	-
1991	2,330	7,456	-
2001	2,387	7,093	-
2011	2,052	5,877	13,396
2021	1,829	5,002	11,350

== History ==
Farkadona is named after the ancient Thessalian town Pharcadon (Ancient Greek: Φαρκαδών - Pharkadon). The ruins of ancient Pharcadon are located on a hill near the village of Klokotos, 5 km southwest of the modern town. The modern town of Farkadona was known as Tsioti before 1955.
