= Kaliakouda =

Mountain in Central Greece

- Καλιακούδα
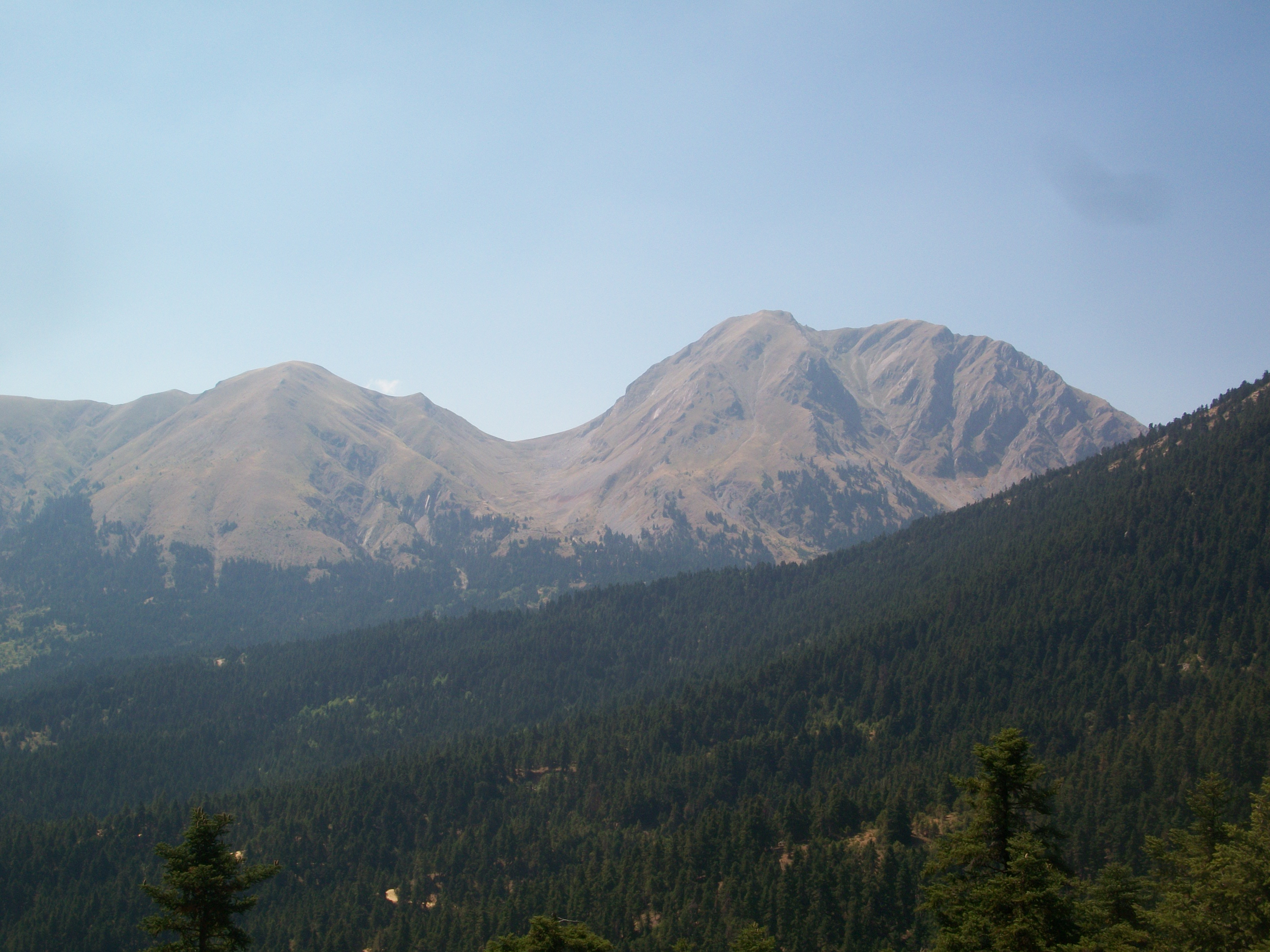
- View of Kaliakouda

Highest point
- Elevation: 2,101 m (6,893 ft)
- Coordinates: 38°47′45″N 21°45′32″E

Geography
- Location within Greece
- Location: Evrytania, Central Greece
- Parent range: Pindus Mountains

Mount Kaliakouda (Greek: Καλιακούδα) is a mountain in the Evrytania regional unit, Central Greece. It has a height of 2,101 metres above sea level.

Kaliakouda is a south-eastern extension of the southern Pindus Mountains, and is located between the mountains of Vardousia, Tymfristos and Panaitoliko. An unpaved road leads to the saddle at 1,741 m (5,712 ft), east of the mountain.
