= George E. Mylonas =

Greek archaeologist (1898–1988)

- Γεώργιος Μυλωνάς
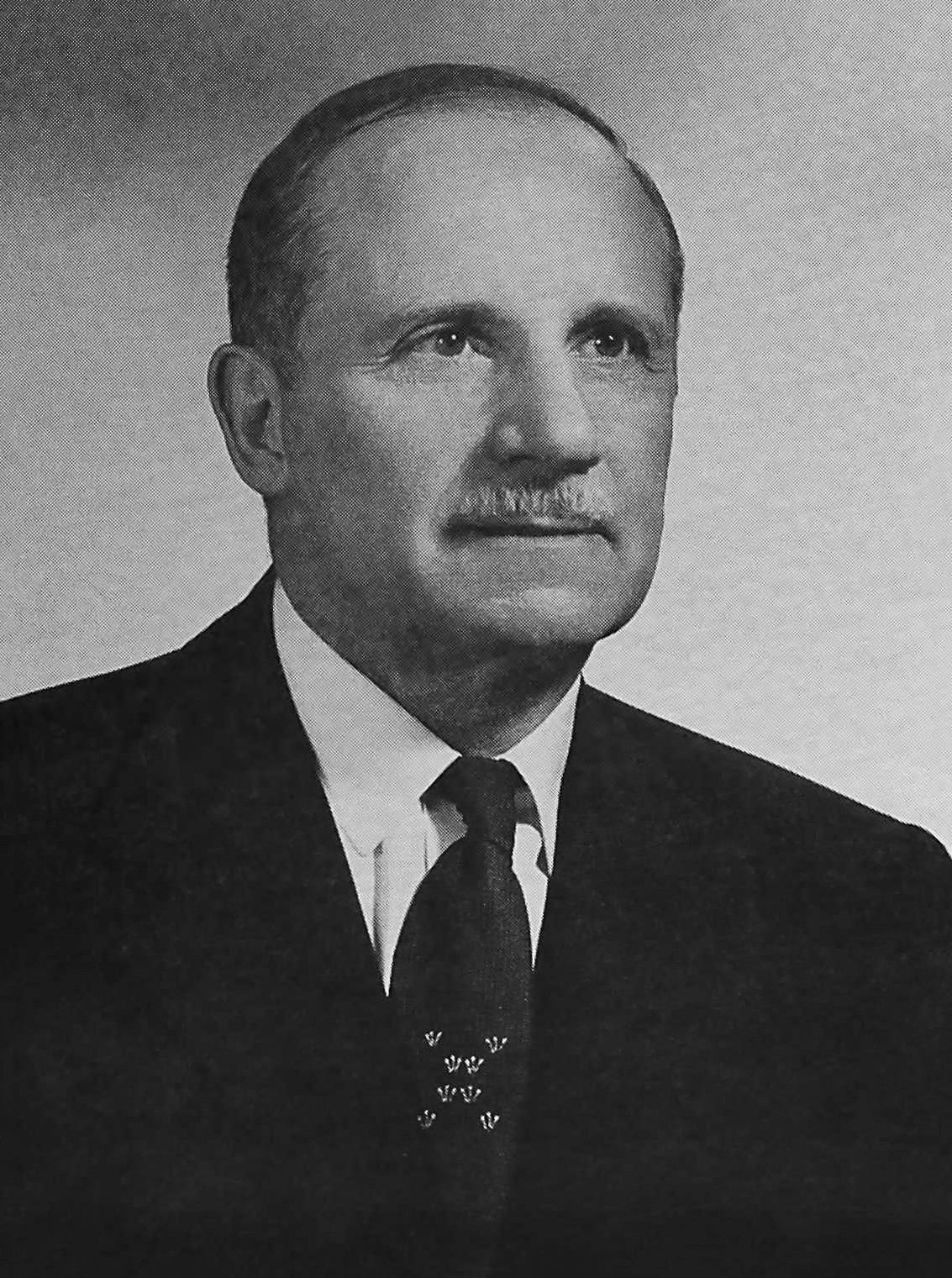
- Mylonas in 1961
- Born: Georgios Mylonas; December 21 [O.S. December 9] , 1898; Smyrna, Ottoman Empire
- Died: April 15, 1988 (aged 89); Athens, Greece
- Resting place: Mykines, Greece
- Occupation: Classical archaeologist
- Known for: Excavations, including Grave Circle B at Mycenae
- Spouse: Lena Papazoglou (m. 1925)
- Children: 4, including Ione Mylonas Shear
- Awards: Order of George I (Commander); Royal Order of the Phoenix (Grand Commander); Gold Medal of the Archaeological Institute of America

Academic background
- Education: International College of Smyrna; University of Athens; Johns Hopkins University
- Thesis: Η νεολιθική εποχή εν Ελλάδι [The Neolithic Period in Greece] (1928)

Academic work
- Institutions: University of Chicago; University of Illinois; Washington University in St. Louis
- Notable students: Michael Cosmopoulos; Elizabeth Schofield
- Military career
- Allegiance: Kingdom of Greece
- Service years: 1919–1923
- Wars: Greco-Turkish War (1919–1922)

George Emmanuel Mylonas (Greek: Γεώργιος Μυλωνάς, romanized: Georgios Mylonas, Greek pronunciation: [/ʝe'oɾʝios milo'nas/], ye-OR-yios mee-loh-NAS; 21 December [O.S. 9 December] 1898 – April 15, 1988) (Note: Greece adopted the Gregorian calendar in 1923; February 28 [O.S. February 15] was followed by March 1.) was a Greek archaeologist of ancient Greece and of Aegean prehistory. He excavated widely, particularly at Olynthus, Eleusis and Mycenae, where he made the first archaeological study and publication of Grave Circle B, the earliest known monumentalized burials at the site.

Mylonas was born in Smyrna, then part of the Ottoman Empire, and received an elite education. He enrolled in 1919 at the University of Athens to study classics, joined the Greek Army, and fought in the Greco-Turkish War of 1919–1922. He witnessed the destruction of Smyrna in September 1922, and was subsequently taken prisoner; he was recaptured after a brief escape, but was released in 1923 after bribing his captors with money sent by his American contacts.

In 1924, Mylonas began working for the American School of Classical Studies at Athens, with which he retained a lifelong association. He became its first bursar the following year, and took part in excavations at Corinth, Nemea, and Olynthus under its auspices. After receiving his Ph.D. from the University of Athens in 1927, he moved to Johns Hopkins University in the United States to study under David Moore Robinson, his excavation director from Olynthus. He subsequently taught at the University of Chicago. After a brief return to Greece, during which he taught at a gymnasium and made his first excavations at Eleusis, he was hired by the University of Illinois at Urbana-Champaign in 1931, before moving to Washington University in St. Louis in 1933, where he remained until returning permanently to Greece in 1969. There, he was prominent in the Archaeological Society of Athens and in efforts to conserve the monuments of the Acropolis of Athens.

Mylonas's excavation work included the sites of Pylos, Artemision, Mekyberna, Polystylos and Aspropotamos. Along with John Papadimitriou, he was given responsibility for the excavation of Mycenae's Grave Circle B in the early 1950s, and from 1957 until 1985 excavated on the citadel of the site. His excavations helped to establish the chronological relationships between Mycenae's structures, which had been excavated piecemeal over the preceding century, and to determine the religious function of the site's Cult Center, to which he gave its name. He was awarded the Order of George I, the Royal Order of the Phoenix and the Gold Medal of the Archaeological Institute of America, of which he was the first foreign-born president. His work at Mycenae has been credited with bringing coherence to the previously scattered and sporadically published record of excavation at the site. At the same time, his belief that ancient Greek mythical traditions, particularly concerning the Trojan War and the Eleusinian Mysteries, could be verified by archaeological excavation was controversial in his day and has generally been discredited since.

== Early life ==
George Emmanuel Mylonas was born on December 21, [O.S. December 9] 1898, to a Greek-speaking family in Smyrna in Ionia, then part of the Ottoman Empire. According to a 1958 profile, he first took an interest in archaeology at the age of eight, when his father's gardener unearthed an ancient burial on the family property. Mylonas attended Smyrna's Evangelical School, considered the most important Greek school in the city, until 1915, (Note: Cosmopoulos 2013, p. 11. For the Evangelical School, see Georgiadou 2004, p. 141.) and subsequently graduated with a bachelor's degree from the American-run International College of Smyrna in 1918. He entered the University of Athens in 1919, joining the second year of its course in classics. He was a classmate of John Papadimitriou, later an archaeologist with the Greek Archaeological Service, and was taught by Christos Tsountas, who had excavated at the Bronze Age site of Mycenae and at prehistoric sites throughout Greece.

During the Greco-Turkish War of 1919–1922, Mylonas joined the Greek Army and was deployed to Turkey as part of the Army of Asia Minor. He was present at the destruction of Smyrna by the Turks in September 1922. (Note: Mylonas 1940, p. 29. On the origins of the fire, see Prott 2016, p. 181, and Goalwin 2022, p. 126.) Alexander MacLachlan, a witness to the city's destruction, recalled seeing Mylonas deliver a Christian service in Greek on the morning of Sunday, September 10 [O.S. August 28], following an English-language service for refugees who had sheltered in the chapel of the International College. While fleeing from Smyrna towards Samos, Mylonas was captured and imprisoned at Manisa and Smyrna; he was tortured during his captivity and almost killed. After escaping from the camp at Smyrna in early March 1923, he obtained passage on a French merchant ship, whose crew handed him back to the Turks. He was helped to survive by American friends, his former teachers at the International College, who lent him money to pay bribes and secure his release.

== Early archaeological career ==
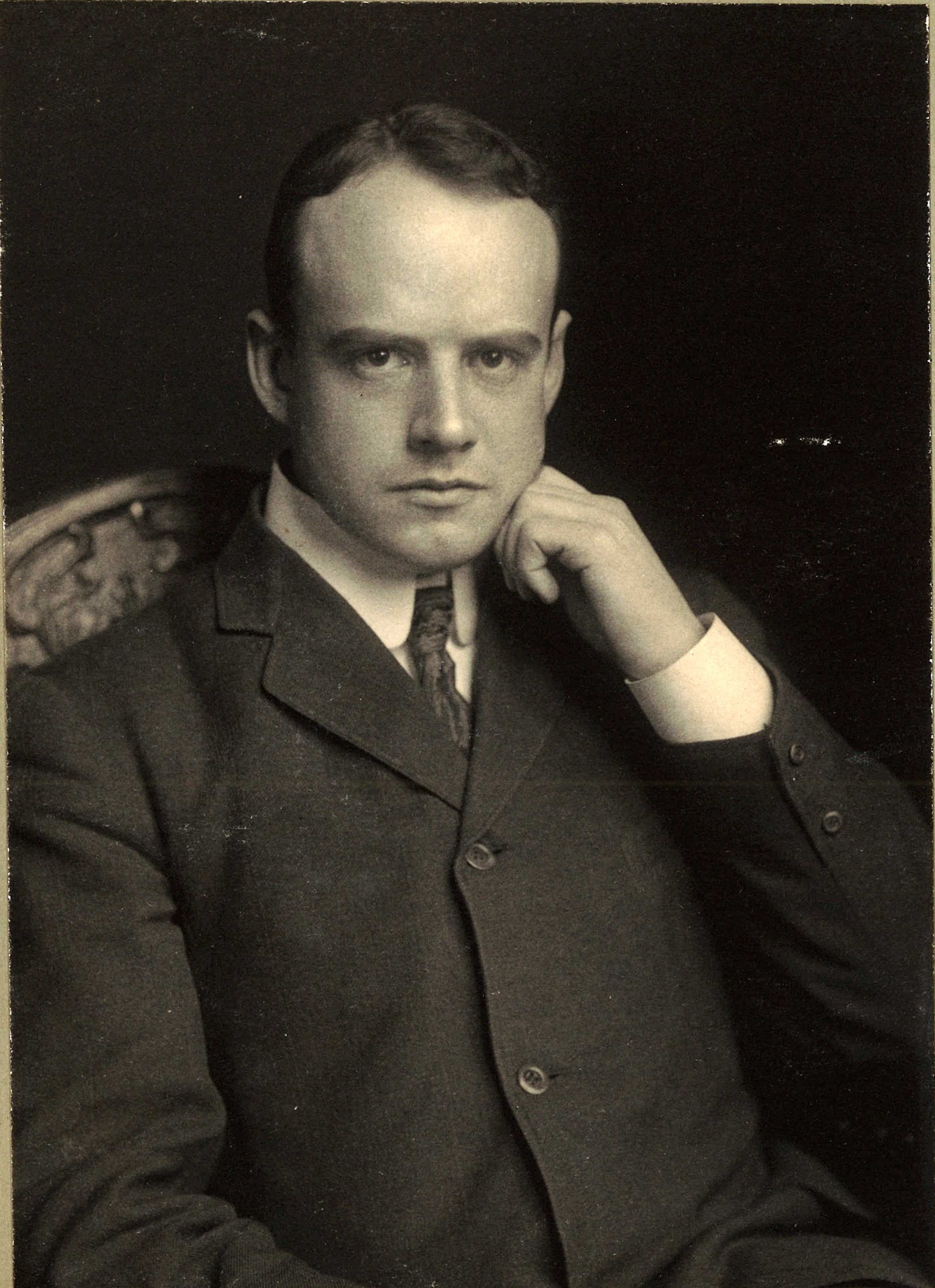
David Moore Robinson, Mylonas's early mentor and lifelong friend, photographed in 1909

After his release, Mylonas returned to Athens, arriving in April 1923. According to Michael Cosmopoulos, who later studied under Mylonas, he may have suffered from post-traumatic stress in the early years after his release. (Note: Cosmopoulos 2013, p. 11. For Cosmopoulos's relationship with Mylonas, see Cosmopoulos 2015, p. xv.) In the second half of 1924, he was hired as a translator at the American School of Classical Studies at Athens (ASCSA), one of Greece's foreign schools of archaeology. The ASCSA had assisted in the evacuation and resettlement of Greek refugees from Ionia and employed many of them in the construction of its Gennadius Library, conducted under the architect W. Stuart Thompson between September 1923 and 1925. According to Natalia Vogeikoff-Brogan, later the archivist of the ASCSA, Mylonas may have been introduced to the school by Hazel Dorothy Hansen, an American archaeologist who probably studied with Mylonas at Athens. He acted as an interpreter for Thompson and wrote his own doctoral dissertation, The Neolithic Period in Greece, in his free time. (Note: Iakovidis 1989, p. 235. The thesis is The thesis is Mylonas 1928.) From July 1, 1925, he worked part-time as the ASCSA's first bursar; he was also seconded as an assistant to Gilbert Campbell Scoggins, the librarian of the Gennadius. (Note: Capps 1926, p. 17; for Scoggin's full name, see Luce 1945, p. 583.)

Mylonas worked on the excavations of Corinth under the ASCSA's director Bert Hodge Hill, who led them until 1926; (Note: Iakovidis 1989, p. 235. For the dates of Hill's excavations, see Robinson 2011, p. xxiii.) between 1923 and 1928, he worked with Carl Blegen, Hill's lifelong friend who also served as assistant and acting director of the ASCSA, at the sites of Nemea and Aghiorghitika. (Note: Iakovidis 1989, p. 235; de Grummond 1996, p. 790. For Blegen and Hill, see Davis & Vogeikoff-Brogan 2015, p. 5.) Mylonas taught at the University of Athens, from which he received his Ph.D. summa cum laude in 1927. (Note: Kaiser 2023, p. 46; Iakovidis 1989, p. 235 (for the grade).) In 1928, he resigned from his bursary post at the ASCSA and emigrated to the United States to study at Johns Hopkins University in Baltimore under David Moore Robinson, the excavator of the classical site of Olynthus in the Chalkidiki region of northern Greece. He was with Robinson as a representative of the ASCSA, in whose name the dig was conducted, for the Olynthus excavation season of February 17 to June 2, 1928.

== Academic career in the United States ==
Mylonas was awarded his second Ph.D. by Johns Hopkins in 1928; his dissertation was published as the first volume in the series presenting the results of the Olynthus excavations. In the same year, he took a temporary teaching job at the University of Chicago, which allowed him to remain in the US until 1930. On his return to Greece, he directed the excavations of the Mycenaean site of Aghios Kosmas in Attica. The project, under the auspices of the Archaeological Service, began in 1930 and continued in 1931. He also made a study of the topography of Attica and taught part-time at the Ioannis Metaxas gymnasium, a high school. From 1930, he excavated at Eleusis alongside the Greek archaeologist Konstantinos Kouroniotis, who tasked him with uncovering the Bronze Age remains towards the southwestern part of the site and with excavating under the building considered to have been the Telesterion, the focal point of the Eleusinian Mysteries. Mylonas was at Olynthus with Robinson for the 1931 excavation season, having been sent by the ASCSA in response to the school's dissatisfaction with Robinson's excavation methods. Mylonas returned to the United States later in 1931: he was hired by William Abbott Oldfather, the dean of the University of Illinois at Urbana-Champaign, as a temporary assistant professor on an annual salary of $2,200 (equivalent to $42,400 in 2025). Mylonas excavated at Olynthus in 1932 and 1933, and at Eleusis each year from 1932 until 1934.

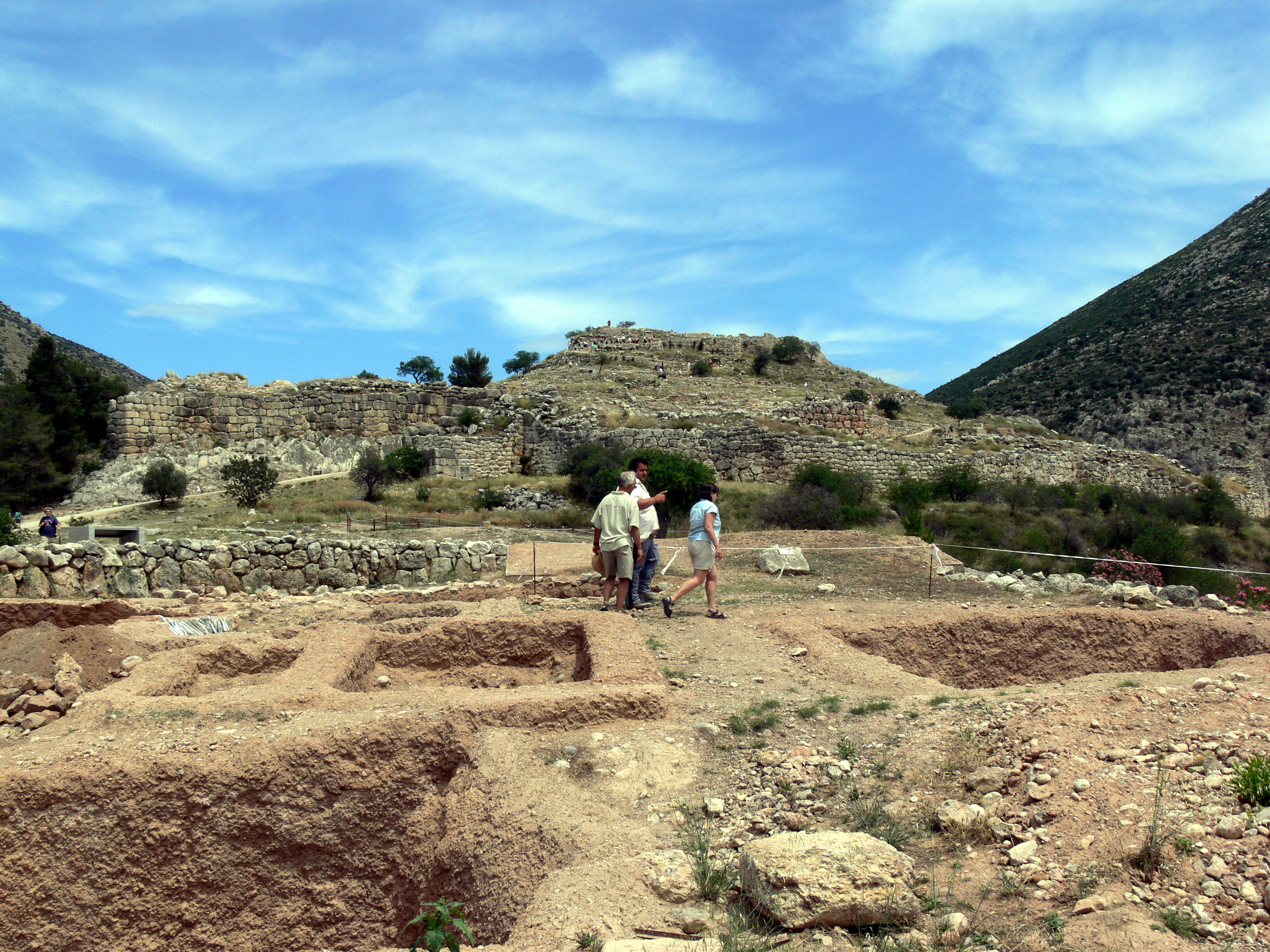
Grave Circle B at Mycenae, excavated by Mylonas and Papadimitriou in 1952–1953

In 1933, Mylonas was hired on a permanent basis at Washington University in St. Louis as an assistant professor in the Department of Art History and Archaeology. (Note: Kaiser 2023, p. 120; Iakovidis 1989, p. 235 (for Mylonas's initial academic rank).) Robinson had previously tried to maneuver another of his students, James Walter Graham, into the position. Mylonas wrote to Robinson, crediting him with securing him the position through his influence and contacts. Mylonas became a naturalized US citizen in 1937, though spent most of his time in Greece. By 1938, he had been promoted to full professor. He served on the ASCSA's managing committee between 1937 and 1939, returned to Olynthus as co-director of the excavation with Robinson in March–June 1938, and made exploratory excavations at Mekyberna – the port of Olynthus – Polystylos and Aspropotamos, all in Greek Macedonia, in the same year.

Mylonas became chair of Washington University's Department of Art History and Archaeology in 1939. He returned briefly to the University of Illinois for the 1939–1940 academic year, before resuming his post in St. Louis. During World War II, he orchestrated the founding of the Greek War Relief Association, a charity which raised money to alleviate poverty in Greece. He also delivered lessons to officers of the United States Army on the Eastern Mediterranean, and wrote An Introduction to the History of the Balkan States, which aimed to make a historical case against the legitimacy of the annexation of Greek Macedonia by Bulgaria and was published in 1946. He returned to the ASCSA's managing committee in the same year.

The Greek government suspended all archaeological investigation in the country after the war, a state of affairs which continued until 1952. (Note: The Greek Civil War lasted from 1944 until 1949; 1952 was the year that Greece adopted its post-war constitution.) Mylonas spent the 1951–1952 academic year on a Fulbright scholarship, teaching at the National and Kapodistrian University of Athens (as the University of Athens had been renamed). Simultaneously, he served as an annual professor at the ASCSA; following the suggestion of the chairman, Charles Morgan, that a vice-chairman be appointed in case he was called for military service, Mylonas was given the position. Mylonas also led the school's 1951–1952 "Summer Session" for visiting archaeology students.

Once the Greek ban on excavation was lifted, Mylonas entered what Vogeikoff-Brogan calls "an excavation frenzy". He worked at Pylos under Blegen, where he cleared a Mycenaean chamber tomb in the nearby cemetery at Volimidia; he also worked at Aghios Kosmas, and at Eleusis in the same season. On December 22, 1951, he visited, along with John Papadimitriou, what would become known as Grave Circle B at Mycenae, which had been discovered that November by the ephor Seraphim Charitonidis during restoration of the nearby Tomb of Clytemnestra. Mylonas and Papadimitriou cleared the area of the grave circle between January 5 and 11 the following year, funded by Washington University. Papadimitriou was appointed to lead the excavation, and himself organized a committee of archaeologists, consisting of Mylonas, Charitonidis, Antonios Keramopoulos and Spyridon Marinatos, to oversee the work. The first season of excavation began on July 3 and continued until October 10, by which point seven tombs had been fully uncovered. That September, Mylonas also directed a return excavation of the underwater shipwreck first discovered at Artemision in 1926. He co-directed the second season at Grave Circle B, which ran from July 31 to the first third of October 1953, with Papadimitriou; in this season, a further eleven tombs were excavated. The two returned to co-direct the third and final season of excavation, which Mylonas considered the most productive, between July 8 and September 6, 1954: this time, six more tombs were uncovered, leaving the central area of the grave circle fully excavated, and remains of Middle Helladic buildings in the eastern area of the site were investigated.

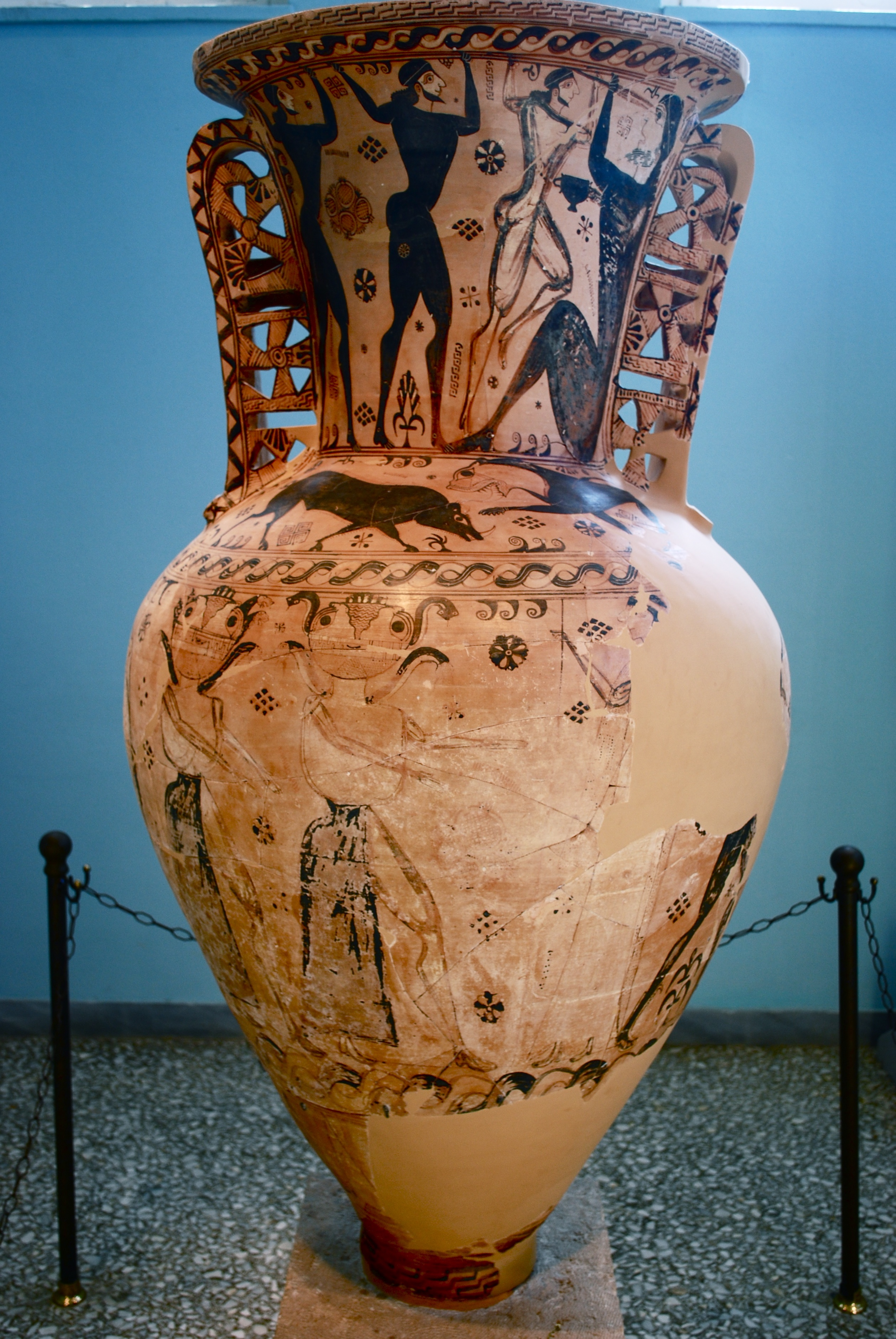
The "Eleusis Amphora", discovered by Mylonas in 1954, showing the blinding of Polyphemus

Between 1952 and 1957, Mylonas co-directed the excavations at Eleusis with John Travlos: in 1954, his work in the Western Cemetery uncovered the Eleusis Amphora, considered among the finest examples of proto-Attic art. From 1957 until 1985, he led excavations on the citadel of Mycenae. (Note: "G. E. Mylonas, 89, Archeologist Who Led Greek Excavations, Dies". The New York Times. May 2, 1988. Section D, p. 14.; Shelton 2010, p. 26 (for the dates).) He re-excavated most of the acropolis of the site: Tsountas had cleared it in the late nineteenth century, but died before publishing the results of his work. (Note: Shelton 2010, p. 26. For the dates of Tsountas's excavations, see Shelton 2006, p. 161.) Much of Mylonas's work on the acropolis concerned the establishment of a chronological sequence for its various constructions, particularly the palace and the fortifications surrounding it; he traced the initial fortification of the site to the fourteenth century BCE, with further development throughout the thirteenth century BCE. He excavated areas of settlement to the north and west of the citadel, including (between 1962 and 1964) a section which he named the "House M Quarter". He also investigated the site's Cult Center, to which he gave its modern name on the grounds of his interpretation of the structure as a focus for religious ritual.

Mylonas held a Fulbright Professorship at Athens in 1954, and spent periods throughout the 1950s at the Institute for Advanced Study in Princeton, New Jersey. His M.A. students in the late 1950s included the Anglo-American archaeologist Elizabeth Schofield, later known for her work at Knossos, at Lefkandi and on the island of Kea. He served as president of the Archaeological Institute of America between 1957 and 1960, becoming the first foreign-born person to hold the post, and held a visiting professorship at the ASCSA in 1963–1964, during which he conducted a tour of Crete and offered a course in Mycenaean civilization. In 1964, he stepped down as department chair at Washington University; he was made the inaugural Rosa May Distinguished Professor in the Humanities in 1965.

== Return to Greece and later life ==
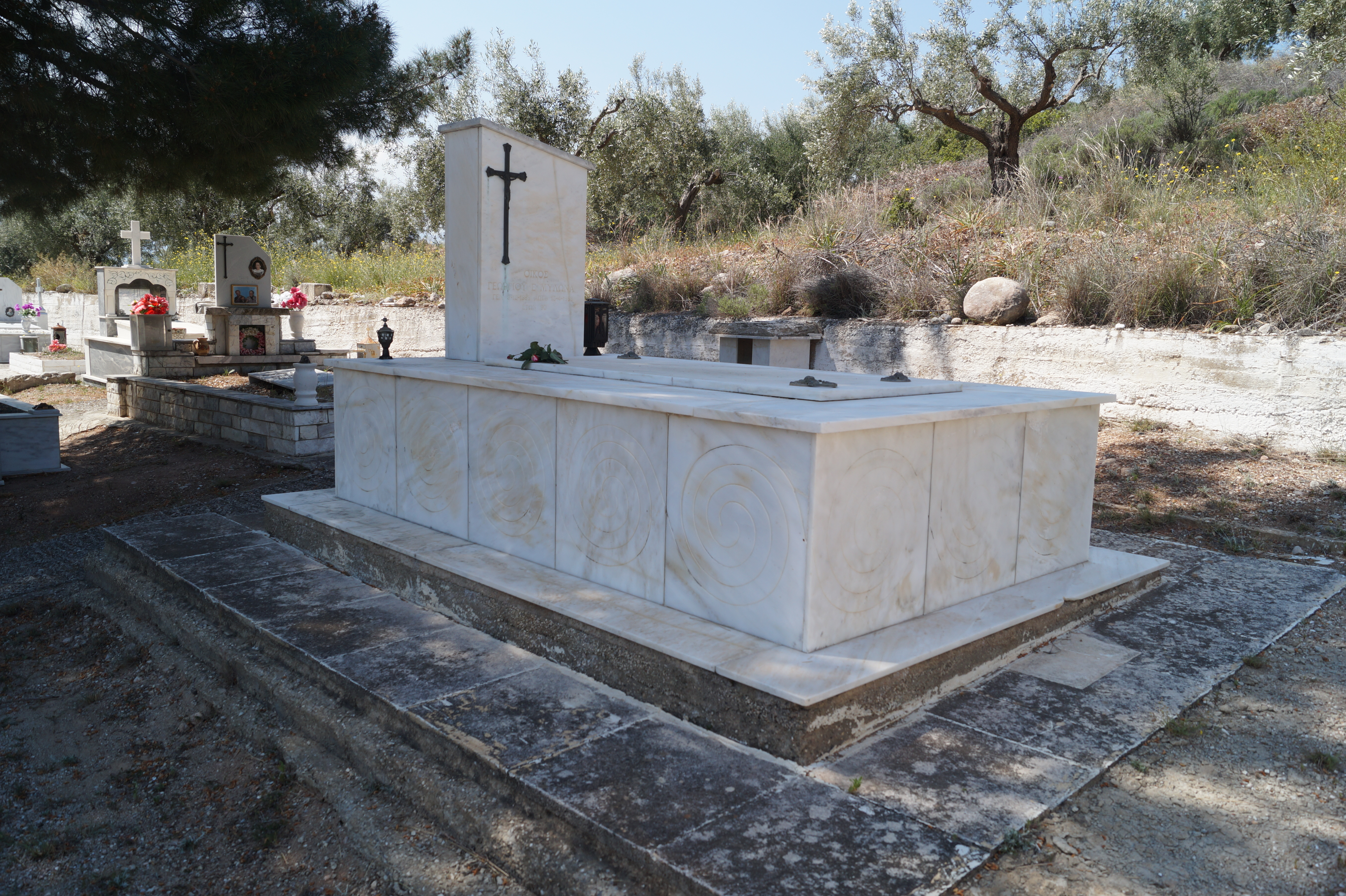
Mylonas's tomb at Mykines

Mylonas retired from Washington University in 1969 and returned to Greece. Between 1969 and 1971, he served on the council of the Archaeological Society of Athens, a learned society with a prominent role in the excavation and conservation of archaeological heritage; he was its vice president from 1978 to 1979, and its secretary general from 1979 until 1986. Between 1978 and 1986, he served as chairman of the Committee for the Conservation of the Acropolis Monuments, an organization of archaeologists, architects, engineers and other specialists created by the Greek Ministry of Culture to oversee restorations on the Acropolis.

Mylonas appeared in Michael Wood's televised series, In Search of the Trojan War, in 1985. In an interview conducted at the citadel of Mycenae, Mylonas spoke of coming to the site by night to converse with the mythical king Agamemnon. He once said that the task of the archaeologist was to "infer from withered flowers the hour of their bloom". A Festschrift in his honor was published in four volumes by the Archaeological Society between 1986 and 1990. (Note: Vogeikoff-Brogan 2017. The volumes of the Festschrift are Archaeological Society of Athens 1986, Archaeological Society of Athens 1987, Archaeological Society of Athens 1989 and Archaeological Society of Athens 1990.) He died in Athens on April 15, 1988, two weeks after having a heart attack at his home. (Note: The archaeological historian Vasileios Petrakos attributes Mylonas's heart attack to unfounded accusations of malpractice made against him in connection with the construction of a new museum at Mycenae.) He was buried at Mykines, the modern village adjacent to the site of Mycenae.

== Personal life ==
Mylonas met Lena Papazoglou, another Greek refugee from Ionia, shortly after his return to Greece in 1923; the couple married in 1925. Mylonas remained a friend of Robinson, his former doctoral advisor, throughout his life; upon his death in 1958, Robinson left Mylonas a Greek vase from his collection and $20,000 (equivalent to $223,183 in 2025) towards his research. According to the Canadian archaeologist Mary Ross Ellingson, who excavated with Mylonas at Olynthus, he was formal and aloof in his manners, preferring to address fellow excavation staff by their surnames and as "Mr." or "Miss".

Mylonas and Lena had a son, Alexander, shortly after their marriage; Alexander died in a car accident in 1959. They also had three daughters, one of whom, Ione Mylonas Shear (born in 1936), became an archaeologist, and frequently assisted her father in his excavations at Mycenae. Another daughter, Eunice (Nike), born in 1934, married the artist and teacher Robert Beverly Hale. Lena Mylonas died in 1993.

== Honors, legacy and assessment ==
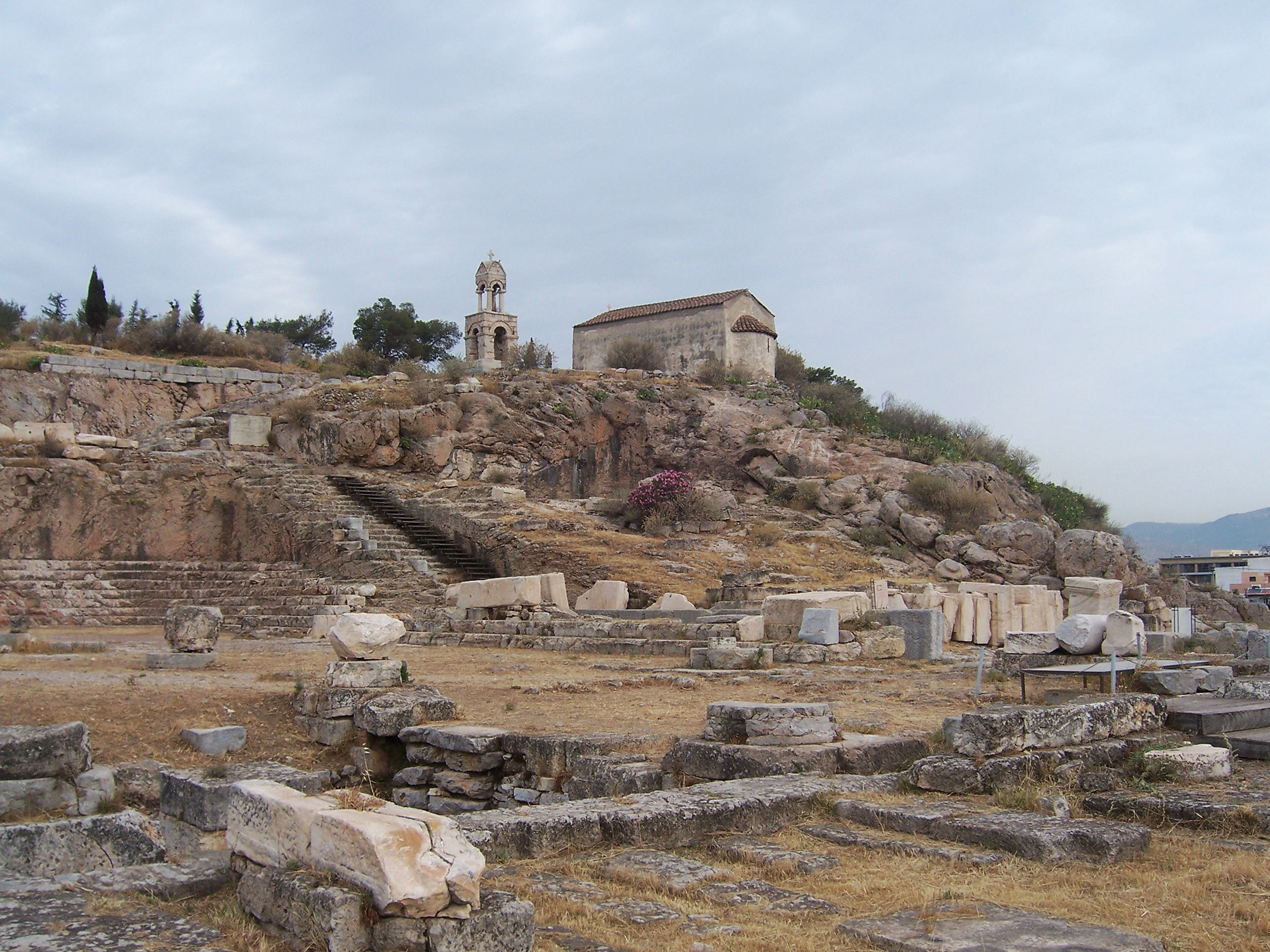
The ruins at Eleusis of the building identified by Mylonas as the Telesterion, the focal centre of the Eleusinian Mysteries

Mylonas was a prolific writer and lecturer, publishing around 150 articles in academic journals and delivering over 1000 public lectures. At Mycenae, his excavations uncovered tombs and structures outside the citadel and established the function of the Cult Center within it. His investigations of the citadel's fortifications established their date, while his excavations of the approach-routes to the palace revealed the full extent of the structure. Spyros Iakovidis, who succeeded Mylonas as director of the excavation of Mycenae, credits him with connecting the work of Tsountas, which was prolific but largely unpublished, with that of Alan Wace, who excavated various areas of the site throughout the first half of the twentieth century. The archaeologist Diamantis Panagiotopoulos has called Mylonas's 1927 dissertation the first publication to systematically synthesize the Neolithic material from the Greek mainland and the island of Crete.

Vogeikoff-Brogan has called Mylonas a pioneer in archaeological fundraising; without the large institutional budgets of colleagues like Blegen, Mylonas cultivated relationships with wealthy members of St. Louis society, encouraged his financial supporters to visit and participate in his excavations, and reported his work energetically in the St. Louis local press. Between 1963 and his retirement in 1969, he led archaeological cruises to Greece, whose ticket price included a donation to his excavation work. During his time at Washington University, Mylonas established the philanthropic Mycenaean Foundation with support from American friends and students. The foundation opened an archaeologists' hostel, known as McCarthy House, and a cultural center and medical clinic, known as the Mycenaean Melathron, in the village of Mykines in 1969. He also played a role in the establishment of a new museum at the archaeological site of Mycenae. A scholarship for undergraduate humanities majors at Washington University is named in Mylonas's honor. His personal scrapbooks are held by the archive of the American School of Classical Studies in Athens.

Mylonas believed in the essential historicity of the Greek mythical tradition; in his work on Mycenae, he attempted to establish chronological dates for the reign of Agamemnon and the Trojan War. At Eleusis, he claimed to have followed the directions of the ancient geographer Pausanias and to have discovered the tombs of the mythical Seven against Thebes. More recent study has suggested that the tradition that the Seven were buried at Eleusis may significantly postdate the supposed date of their existence, and most modern scholars reject the suggestion that the myths of Agamemnon and Troy can be connected to any archaeological material. A contemporary review of his 1966 book, Mycenae and the Mycenaean Age, described his practice of using the mythological tradition to reconstruct historical events as "a dangerous procedure at best". Similarly, Mylonas's contention that he had discovered a Bronze Age temple to the goddess Demeter at Eleusis, following the narrative of the ancient Homeric Hymn to Demeter by which the goddess ordered the construction of her first temple at the site, is now considered unsupported by the available evidence. (Note: Glowacki 2016, p. 676. For Mylonas's own statement of this theory, see Mylonas 1947, pp. 131–133.)

Mylonas was awarded honorary degrees by Washington University, the University of Thessaloniki, Ohio State University and Southern Illinois University. (Note: Iakovidis 1989, p. 237; "Corrigendum: George Emmanuel Mylonas (1898–1988)". American Journal of Archaeology. 93 (4): 629. 1989. JSTOR 505356.) He received two Guggenheim Fellowships, the first in 1955 and the second in 1968. In 1955, he was made a Commander of the Order of George I by King Paul of Greece; he also became a Grand Commander of the Royal Order of the Phoenix. He was awarded the Archaeological Institute of America's Gold Medal for Distinguished Archaeological Achievement in 1970. He was also made an honorary citizen of Eleusis and Mycenae, and presented with a golden key to the city of Washington, D.C. He became a member of the Academy of Athens, Greece's national academy, in 1970, (Note: Iakovidis 1989, p. 237; Τακτικά μέλη της Ακαδημίας Αθηνών κατά σειρά εκλογής [Regular Members of the Academy of Athens in Order of Election] (in Greek). Academy of Athens. November 11, 2015.) and served as its president in 1980. He was elected an honorary fellow of the Society of Antiquaries of London in 1978, and was also a member of the American Academy of Arts and Sciences.

== Published works ==
=== As author ===
- Mylonas, George E. (1928). Ἠ νεολιθική ἐποχή ἐν Ἑλλάδι [The Neolithic Period in Greece] (Ph.D. thesis) (in Greek). University of Athens – via HathiTrust.
- — (1936). "Review: Homer and Mycenae by Martin P. Nilsson". The Classical Journal. 31 (5): 319–321. JSTOR 3291559.
- — (1937). "A Mycenaean Figurine at the University of Illinois". American Journal of Archaeology. 41 (2): 237–247. JSTOR 498413.
- — (1940). "Athens and Minoan Crete". Harvard Studies in Classical Philology. 51: 11–36. JSTOR 45134343.
- — (1942). The Hymn to Demeter and Her Sanctuary at Eleusis. Washington Universities Studies. St. Louis: Washington University. OCLC 217621407.
- — (1947) [1946]. The Balkan States: An Introduction to Their History. Washington, D.C.: Public Affairs Press. hdl:2027/mdp.39015014645280.
- — (1947). "Eleusis and the Eleusinian Mysteries". The Classical Journal. 43 (3): 130–146. JSTOR 3293727.
- — (December 1954). "Mycenae, City of Agamemnon". Scientific American. 191 (6): 72–79. Bibcode:1954SciAm.191f..72M. doi:10.1038/scientificamerican1254-72. JSTOR 24943710.
- — (June 1955). "Archaeology in Greece: An International Heritage". The Atlantic.
- — (1956). "Mycenaean Greek and Minoan–Mycenaean Relations". Archaeology. 9 (4): 273–279. ISSN 0003-8113. JSTOR 41663417.
- — (1957). Ancient Mycenae: The Capital City of Agamemnon. Princeton: Princeton University Press. OCLC 459757596.
- — (1959). Aghios Kosmas: An Early Bronze Age Settlement and Cemetery in Attica. Appendix by John Lawrence Angel. London: Oxford University Press. OCLC 499843.
- — (1961). Eleusis and the Eleusinian Mysteries. Princeton: Princeton University Press. ISBN 9780691648873.
- — (1966). Mycenae and the Mycenaean Age. Princeton: Princeton University Press. ISBN 9780691035239.
- — (1972). Ὁ ταφικὸς Κύκλος Β τῶν Μυκηνῶν [Grave Circle B at Mycenae] (PDF) (in Greek). Vol. 1. Athens: Archaeological Society of Athens. OCLC 563477782.
- — (1973). Ὁ ταφικὸς Κύκλος Β τῶν Μυκηνῶν [Grave Circle B at Mycenae] (PDF) (in Greek). Vol. 2. Athens: Archaeological Society of Athens. OCLC 563477782.
- — (1975). Τὸ δυτικὸν νεκροταφεῖον τῆς Ἐλευσῖνος [The Western Cemetery at Eleusis] (PDF) (in Greek). Vol. 1. Athens: Archaeological Society of Athens. OCLC 1229191075.
- — (1975). Τὸ δυτικὸν νεκροταφεῖον τῆς Ἐλευσῖνος [The Western Cemetery at Eleusis] (PDF) (in Greek). Vol. 2. Athens: Archaeological Society of Athens. OCLC 1229191075.
- — (1980). Ἁναστυλώτικαι ἐργασίαι εἰς τὴν Ακρόπολιν [Restoration Works on the Acropolis]. Πρακτικὰ τῆς Ἀκαδημίας Ἀθηνῶν [Proceedings of the Academy of Athens] (in Greek). 55 (2): 26–58.
- — (1981). Mycenae: A Guide to Its Ruins and Its History. Athens: Ekdotike Athenon. OCLC 8005169.
- — (1983). Mycenae Rich in Gold. Athens: Ekdotike Athenon. OCLC 11201724.

=== As editor ===
- Mylonas, George E.; Raymond, Doris, eds. (1951–1953). Studies Presented to David Moore Robinson on His Seventieth Birthday. St. Louis, MO: Washington University. OCLC 427342596.

== Works cited ==
- Anderson, A. Sebastian (2015). "The Seven Against Thebes at Eleusis". Illinois Classical Studies. 40 (2): 297–318. doi:10.5406/illiclasstud.40.2.0297. ISSN 0363-1923. JSTOR 10.5406/illiclasstud.40.2.0297.
- Buck, Robert J. (1967). "Reviewed Work(s): Mycenae and the Mycenaean Age by George E. Mylonas". The Classical Journal. 62 (8): 374. ISSN 0009-8353. JSTOR 3295601.
- Cadogan, Gerald (2006). "Elizabeth Schofield, 1935–2005". American Journal of Archaeology. 110 (1): 157–159. doi:10.3764/aja.110.1.157. ISSN 1939-828X. JSTOR 40026363.
- Capps, Edward (1926). "Forty-Fifth Annual Report of the American School of Classical Studies at Athens". Forty-Fifth Annual Report of the Managing Committee of the American School of Classical Studies at Athens (PDF). American School of Classical Studies at Athens. pp. 9–21.
- Cosmopoulos, Michael B. (2013). Ο Γεώργιος Μυλωνάς στο St. Louis [George Mylonas at St. Louis]. In Petrakos, Vasileios (ed.). Γεώργιος Εμμ. Μυλωνάς: Βίος και έργο 1898–1988 [George Emm. Mylonas: His Life and Work 1898–1988] (PDF). Library of the Archaeological Society of Athens (in Greek). Vol. 290. Archaeological Society of Athens. pp. 11–18. ISBN 978-618-5047-09-2.
- Cosmopoulos, Michael B. (2014). The Sanctuary of Demeter at Eleusis: The Bronze Age: I (PDF). Library of the Archaeological Society of Athens. Vol. 295. Archaeological Society of Athens. ISBN 978-618-5047-16-0.
- Cosmopoulos, Michael B. (2015). Bronze Age Eleusis and the Origins of the Eleusinian Mysteries. Cambridge University Press. ISBN 978-1-107-01099-4.
- Daleziou, Eleftheria (2013). "'Adjuster and Negotiator': Bert Hodge Hill and the Greek Refugee Crisis, 1918–1928". Hesperia. 82 (1): 49–65. doi:10.2972/hesperia.82.1.0049. ISSN 1553-5622. JSTOR 10.2972/hesperia.82.1.0049.
- Davis, Jack L.; Vogeikoff-Brogan, Natalia (2015). "Introduction". In Vogeikoff-Brogan, Natalia; Davis, Jack; Florou, Vasiliki (eds.). Carl Blegen: Personal and Archaeological Narratives. Atlanta: Lockwood Press. pp. 1–15. ISBN 978-1-937040-23-9.
- de Grummond, Nancy (1996). "Mylonas, George Emmanuel (1898–1988)". In de Grummond, Nancy (ed.). An Encyclopaedia of the History of Classical Archaeology. Abingdon: Routledge. pp. 789–790. ISBN 1-884964-80-X.
- Ecenbarger, William (October 31, 1999). "Getting More out of Greece". The Chicago Tribune.
- Filetici, Maria Grazia, ed. (2003). I restauri dell'Acropoli di Atene: 1975–2003 [The Restorations of the Acropolis of Athens: 1975–2003] (in Italian). Rome: Gangemi. ISBN 88-492-0516-3.
- Finley, Moses (August 3, 1967). "Digging the Trojans". New York Review of Books.
- Georgiadou, Maria (2004). Constantin Carathéodory: Mathematics and Politics in Turbulent Times. Berlin: Springer. ISBN 3-540-20352-4.
- Glowacki, Kevin T. (2016). "Review: New Insights into Bronze Age Eleusis and the Formative Stages of the Eleusinian Cults". American Journal of Archaeology. 120 (4): 673–677. doi:10.3764/aja.120.4.0673. ISSN 1939-828X. JSTOR 10.3764/aja.120.4.0673.
- Goalwin, Gregory J. (2022). Borders of Belief: Religious Nationalism and the Formation of Identity in Ireland and Turkey. Rutgers University Press. ISBN 978-1-9788-2648-9.
- Greer, William R. (November 15, 1985). "Robert Hale Dies; A Former Curator". The New York Times. Section D, p. 19.
- Hatzivassiliou, Evanthis (2022). "The Ghost of Trials Past: Transitional Justice in Greece, 1974–1975". Contemporary European History. 31 (2): 286–298. doi:10.1017/S096077732100014X. ISSN 0960-7773.
- Iakovidis, Spyros (1989). "George Emmanuel Mylonas, 1898–1988". American Journal of Archaeology. 93 (2): 235–237. doi:10.1086/AJS505090. ISSN 1939-828X. JSTOR 505090. S2CID 245264983.
- Iakovidou, Athena (2013). Στιγμές του βίου του Γεωργίου Μυλωνά [Moments in the Life of George Mylonas]. In Petrakos, Vasileios (ed.). Γεώργιος Εμμ. Μυλωνάς: Βίος και έργο 1898–1988 [George Emm. Mylonas: His Life and Work 1898–1988]. Library of the Archaeological Society of Athens (in Greek). Archaeological Society of Athens. pp. 209–218. ISBN 978-618-5047-09-2.
- Jenkins, Ian (2007). The Parthenon Sculptures. Cambridge: Harvard University Press. ISBN 978-0-674-02692-6.
- Kaiser, Alan (2023). Archaeology, Sexism, and Scandal: The Long-Suppressed Story of One Woman's Discoveries and the Man Who Stole Credit for Them (2nd ed.). London: Rowman and Littlefield. ISBN 978-1-5381-7498-2.
- Kiminas, Demetrius (2009). The Ecumenical Patriarchate. San Bernardino: The Borgo Press. ISBN 978-1-4344-5876-6.
- Lord, Louis E. (1947). A History of the American School of Classical Studies at Athens 1882–1942 (PDF). Cambridge: Harvard University Press. OCLC 648555.
- Luce, Stephen B. (1945). "Archaeological News and Discussion". American Journal of Archaeology. 49 (4): 582–599. doi:10.2307/499873. ISSN 1939-828X. JSTOR 499873.
- MacKendrick, Paul Lachlan (1981) [1962]. The Greek Stones Speak: The Story of Archaeology in Greek Lands (2nd ed.). New York: Norton. ISBN 0-393-30111-7.
- MacLachlan, Alexander (1937). A Potpourri of Shadows and Sidelights from Turkey (PDF). Documents held in the archive of Kingston University, Ontario. OCLC 933157359.
- Marinatos, Spyridon (1955). Ανασκαφαί εν Πύλῳ [Excavations at Pylos] (PDF). Πρακτικά της εν Αθήναις Αρχαιολογικής Εταιρείας [Proceedings of the Archaeological Society of Athens] (in Greek). 107: 473–496. ISSN 1105-0969.
- Meritt, Lucy Shoe (1984). History of the American School of Classical Studies at Athens, 1939–1980 (PDF). Princeton: American School of Classical Studies at Athens. ISBN 0-87661-942-1.
- Muskett, Georgia (2014). "The Aegean World". In Bahn, Paul (ed.). The History of Archaeology: An Introduction. Abingdon: Routledge. pp. 39–56. ISBN 978-1-317-99942-3.
- Nagel, Else (November 1958). "Profile: Professor George Mylonas" (PDF). Topics. Junior League of St. Louis. p. 5.
- Panagiotopoulos, Diamantis (2015) [2012]. "Mylonas, Georgios". In Cancik, Hubert; Landfester, Manfred; Schneider, Helmuth (eds.). Der Neue Pauly Supplemente I Online – Band 6: Geschichte der Altertumswissenschaften: Biographisches Lexikon [The New Pauly Supplements I Online – Volume 6: History of Ancient Studies: Biographical Dictionary]. Der Neue Pauly – Supplemente, 1. Staffel (in German). Stuttgart: Brill. doi:10.1163/2452-3054_dnpo6_COM_00505.
- Petrakos, Vasileios (August 8, 2003). Αρχαιολογικές έρευνες στις Μυκήνες [Archaeological Discoveries at Mycenae]. I Kathimerini (in Greek).
- Pliatsika, Vassiliki (2015). "Tales of the Unexpected: Identifying Cult Practice in the House M Quarter of the Mycenae Citadel". In Schallin, Ann-Louise; Tournavitou, Iphiyenia (eds.). Mycenaeans up to Date: The Archaeology of the North-Eastern Peloponnese – Current Concepts and New Directions. Stockholm: Swedish Institute at Athens. pp. 597–612. ISBN 978-91-7916-063-0.
- Robinson, Betsy Ann (2011). Histories of Peirene: A Corinthian Fountain in Three Millennia. Princeton: American School of Classical Studies at Athens. ISBN 978-0-87661-965-0.
- Schofield, Louise (2007). The Mycenaeans. New York: J. Paul Getty Museum. ISBN 978-0-89236-867-9.
- Shelton, Kim (2006). "The Long Lasting Effect of Tsountas on the Study of Mycenae". In Darcque, Pascal; Fotiadis, Michael; Polychronopoulou, Olga (eds.). Mythos: La préhistoire égéenne du XIXe au XXIe siècle après J.-C. Actes de la table ronde internationale d'Athènes (21–23 novembre 2002) [Mythos: Aegean Prehistory from the 19th to the 21st Century CE. Acts of the International Round Table in Athens (21–23 November 2002)]. Bulletin de Correspondance Hellénique Suppléments. Vol. 46. French School at Athens. pp. 159–164. ISBN 2-86958-195-5.
- Shelton, Kim (2010). "Mycenae: Archaeology of Mycenae". In Gagarin, Michael (ed.). The Oxford Encyclopedia of Ancient Greece and Rome. Oxford University Press. pp. 23–28. doi:10.1093/acref/9780195170726.001.0001. ISBN 978-0-19-517072-6.
- Shelton, Kim (2022). Well-Built Mycenae: Fascicule 14: The Tsountas House Area. Oxford: Archaeopress. doi:10.2307/j.ctv2ngx5zx. ISBN 978-1-80327-155-2. JSTOR j.ctv2ngx5zx.
- Spitzer, Doreen C. (1993). "New World and Old". The Princeton University Library Chronicle. 54 (2/3): 289–292. doi:10.2307/26403823. ISSN 2994-9157. JSTOR 26403823.
- Vasilikou, Dora (2013). Ο Ταφικός Κύκλος Β: μία ανασκόπηση [Grave Circle B: A Review]. In Petrakos, Vasileios (ed.). Γεώργιος Εμμ. Μυλωνάς: Βίος και έργο 1898–1988 [George Emm. Mylonas: His Life and Work 1898–1988]. Library of the Archaeological Society of Athens (in Greek). Vol. 290. Archaeological Society of Athens. pp. 55–84. ISBN 978-618-5047-09-2.
- Vogeikoff-Brogan, Natalia (October 1, 2015). "Tales of Olynthus, Spoken and Unspoken". From the Archivist's Notebook.
- Vogeikoff-Brogan, Natalia (February 2, 2017). "The Spirit of St. Louis Lives in Athens, Greece". From the Archivist's Notebook.
- Vogeikoff-Brogan, Natalia (April 19, 2020). "Forgotten Friend of Skyros: Hazel Dorothy Hansen (Part I)". From the Archivist's Notebook.
- Vogeikoff-Brogan, Natalia (October 10, 2021). "The Artemision Shipwreck: Sinking into the ASCSA Archives". From the Archivist's Notebook.
- Prott, Volker (2016). The Politics of Self-Determination: Remaking Territories and National Identities in Europe, 1917–1923. Oxford University Press. ISBN 978-0-19-108354-9.
- Whitley, James (2020). "Homer and History". In Pache, Corinne Ondine; Dué, Casey; Lupack, Susan; Lamberton, Robert (eds.). The Cambridge Guide to Homer. Cambridge University Press. pp. 257–266. ISBN 978-1-107-02719-0.
- Φίλια ἔπη εἰς Γεώργιον Ἐ. Μυλωνᾶν διὰ τὰ 60 ἔτη τoῦ ἀνασκαφικoῦ τoυ ἔργoυ [Words of Friendship to George E. Mylonas Upon the Sixtieth Year of His Excavation Work] (PDF). Library of the Archaeological Society of Athens 103. Vol. 1. Athens: Archaeological Society of Athens. 1986. ISBN 960-85025-8-6.
- Φίλια ἔπη εἰς Γεώργιον Ἐ. Μυλωνᾶν διὰ τὰ 60 ἔτη τoῦ ἀνασκαφικoῦ τoυ ἔργoυ [Words of Friendship to George E. Mylonas Upon the Sixtieth Year of His Excavation Work] (PDF). Library of the Archaeological Society of Athens 103. Vol. 2. Athens: Archaeological Society of Athens. 1987. ISBN 960-85025-8-6.
- Φίλια ἔπη εἰς Γεώργιον Ἐ. Μυλωνᾶν διὰ τὰ 60 ἔτη τoῦ ἀνασκαφικoῦ τoυ ἔργoυ [Words of Friendship to George E. Mylonas Upon the Sixtieth Year of His Excavation Work] (PDF). Library of the Archaeological Society of Athens 103. Vol. 3. Athens: Archaeological Society of Athens. 1989. ISBN 960-85025-8-6.
- Φίλια ἔπη εἰς Γεώργιον Ἐ. Μυλωνᾶν διὰ τὰ 60 ἔτη τoῦ ἀνασκαφικoῦ τoυ ἔργoυ [Words of Friendship to George E. Mylonas Upon the Sixtieth Year of His Excavation Work] (PDF). Library of the Archaeological Society of Athens 103. Vol. 4. Athens: Archaeological Society of Athens. 1990. ISBN 960-85025-8-6.
