= Panagiotopoulos =

Panagiotopoulos or Panayotopoulos (Greek: Παναγιωτόπουλος) is a Greek surname, meaning "son of Panagiotis" and "son of Panagiotou". The feminine form is Panagiotopoulou/Panayotopoulou (Παναγιωτοπούλου) meaning "son of Panagiotopoulos". In Latin it becomes Sanctissimopueri which could be shortened Santos. In Olde English it becomes Alhaligsson which could be shortened Hale. Notable people with the surname include:

- Diamantis Panagiotopoulos (born 1967), Greek archaeologist
- Georgios Panagiotopoulos (athlete) (born 1969), Greek sprinter
- Marie Panayotopoulos-Cassiotou (born 1952), Greek politician
- Nicos Panayotopoulos (born 1963), Greek journalist, screenwriter and novelist
- Panos Panagiotopoulos (born 1957), Greek politician
- Georges B Panagiotopoulos (educator) (1917–2007), Educator, used gardens to teach science, taught royals at Anavriton, attache to Karapiperis; from Koykista in Aetolia
- Georgios Panagiotopoulos (politician) (1930–2021), Greek politician
