= Polystylus =

Polystylus may refer to:

- Polystylus (place), an ancient city in the Roman province of Macedonia
- Phalaenopsis, an orchid also called Polystylus Hasselt ex Hassk
