= Georgios Panagiotopoulos =

Georgios Panagiotopoulos may refer to:

- Georgios Panagiotopoulos (athlete)
- Georgios Panagiotopoulos (politician)
