= Koumasa =

Archaeological site on Crete

Coordinates: 34.9833°N 25.0131°E

Koumasa archaeological site
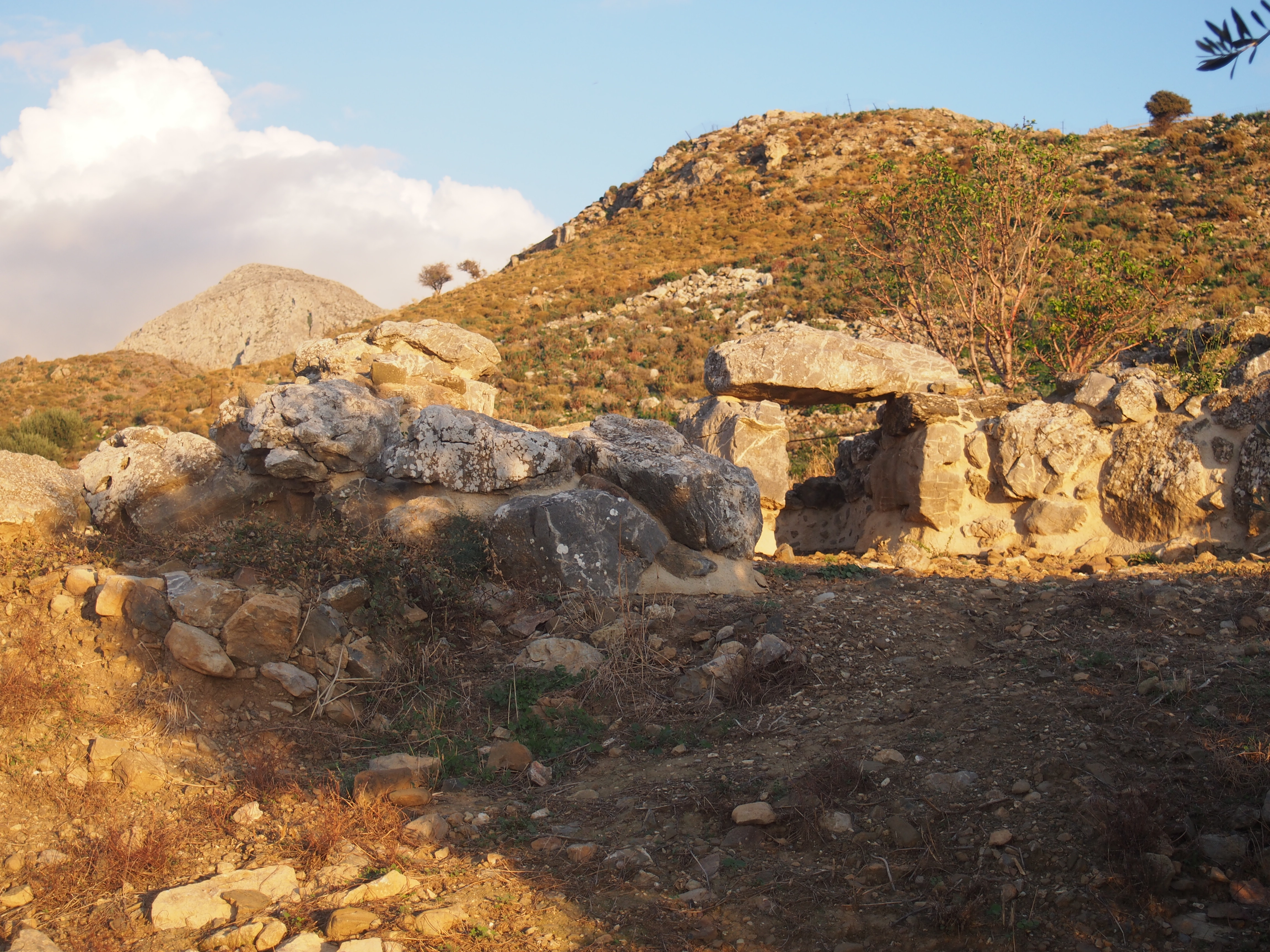
- The archaeological site of Koumasa
- Religion: Minoan religion (tentative)
- Language: Minoan (undeciphered)
- Horizon: Early Bronze Age
- Geographical range: Southern Crete, Mesara Plain
- Period: Prepalatial Minoan
- Dates: c. 3000–1700 BCE
- Type site: Koumasa
- Major sites: Koumasa cemetery and settlement
- Characteristics: Notable for tholos tombs and Koumasa-style figurines
- Followed by: Protopalatial Minoan
- Defined by: Stephanos Xanthoudides (1904–1906)

Koumasa is a Minoan archaeological site in southern Crete, best known for its large prepalatial cemetery. It is located between the villages of Loukia and Koumasa, at the southern edge of the Mesara Plain and near the foothills of the Asterousia Mountains. The site was first excavated by Stephanos Xanthoudides between 1904 and 1906, followed by a second campaign in 1991–1992 by Alexandra Karetsou and Athanasia Kanta. Since 2012, systematic excavations and digital mapping by Heidelberg University under the direction of Prof. Diamantis Panagiotopoulos have revealed new architectural remains, domestic areas, and burial layers that shed light on settlement organization, funerary practices, and cross-cultural artistic influences during the Early Bronze Age.

Koumasa includes both a Prepalatial cemetery and an associated settlement extending across the saddle of the Korakies hill. The site contains large rectangular buildings, storage areas and terraced slopes that indicate long-term occupation and organized settlement planning. The tholos tombs are built with dry-stone masonry and rock-cut foundations, and some show evidence of plastered and painted surfaces.

Burial practices at Koumasa were varied and included cremation, the use of lime, secondary burials and ritual offerings such as pottery, beads and obsidian tools. Many of these items were deliberately broken and placed in specific deposits, reflecting structured ceremonial behavior. The site is also notable for its marble folded-arm figurines, which combine Cycladic features with local Minoan styles. Several figurines were found without heads, and some show modifications that suggest ritual handling.

== Site description ==
The site features four tombs: three tholos tombs and one rectangular tomb. Around 10 metres (30 ft) in diameter and a couple of metres (around 2 metres (7 ft) in height, Minoan tholoi are considered to be the tombs of the elite and are often stocked with valuable artifacts. Though it is known mainly for the presumed burial goods that Stephanos Xanthoudides discovered in his original excavation, the site also extends further to the east. Archaeologists expect the position of the actual city and a precinct of Bronze Age Koumasa to be found there on the steep slope, as well as on top of the mound itself.

== Excavations ==
Koumasa was first excavated by Stephanos Xanthoudides from 1904 to 1906, with findings published in his book The Vaulted Tombs of Mesara. Some time after that, the site was robbed. The site declined until 1991, when Alexandra Karetsou and Athanasia Kanta began another excavation, which continued into 1992.

Excavations were begun again in 2012 with the permission of the Greek Archaeological Service. These excavations were conducted by a multi-year interdisciplinary research programme of Heidelberg University, under the direction of Prof. Dr. Diamantis Panagiotopoulos. The aim of this program was to investigate the site and its vicinity using combined archaeological and scientific methods. Experts from the Heidelberg Geological Institute, supervised by Olaf Bubenzer, were to examine the area using laser technology. The group also includes a team of micromorphology experts from Tel Aviv University, supervised by Yuval Goren.

== Settlement structure at Koumasa ==
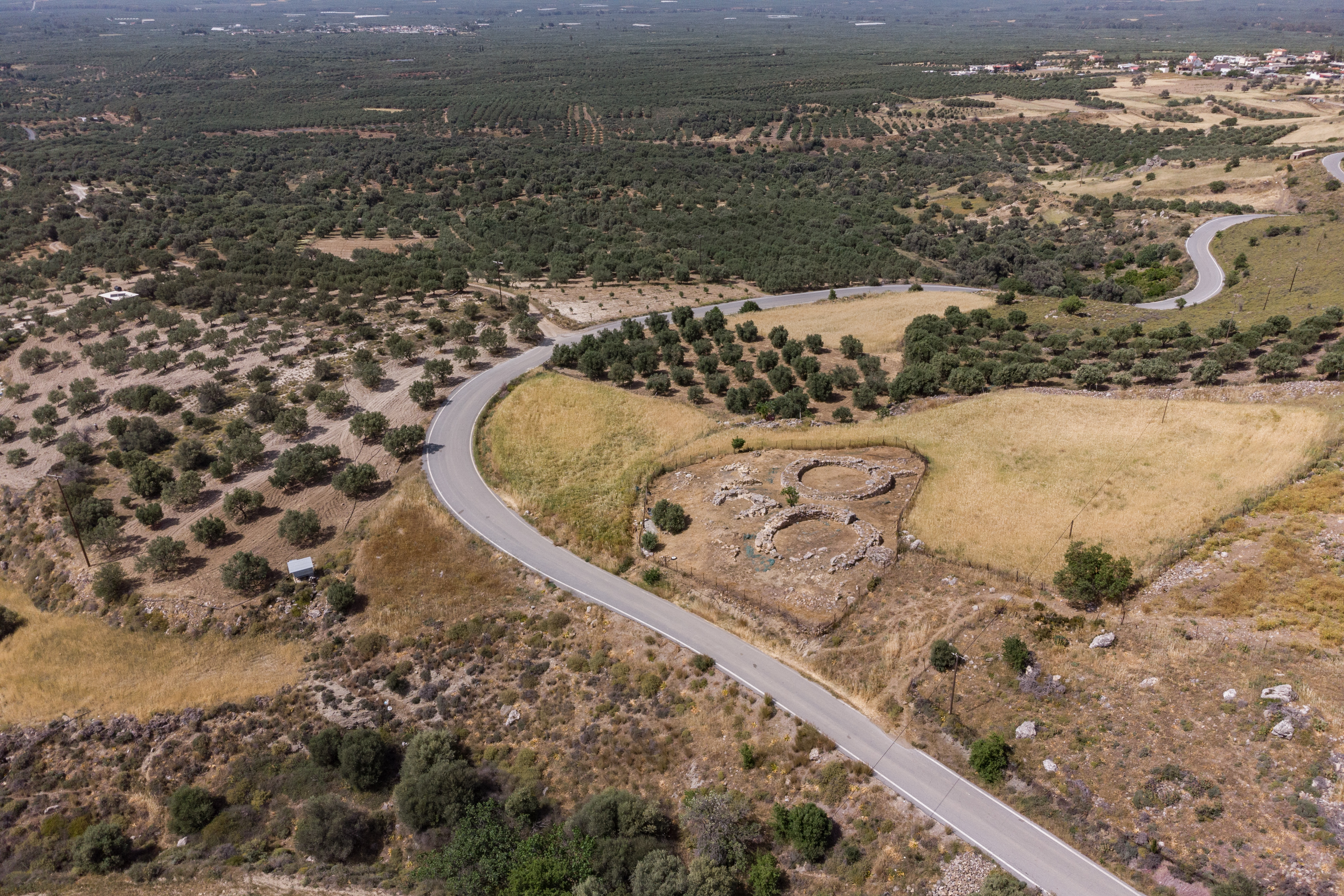
Koumasa settlement excavation area

D. Panagiotopoulos (left) in Koumasa, 2026

=== Spatial extent and layout ===
Between 2012 and 2019, new excavations at Koumasa, led by D. Panagiotopoulos, revealed updated information about the layout of the Minoan settlement. Four trenches were opened on the hill of Korakies. These confirmed that the site covered almost the entire saddle of the hill, extending across at least 30 stremmata. Most buildings followed a southwest-to-northeast orientation.

The excavations revealed multiple building types, including storage rooms, paved floors, and large multi-room structures with several occupational layers. These layers demonstrated continuous use from the Protopalatial period through to the Neopalatial period, indicating that the site remained an active settlement across various phases of Minoan history. Among the structures identified were buildings with thick stone walls, suggesting defensive or administrative purposes, as well as domestic spaces where pottery, stone tools, and bone fragments were recovered.

=== Digital survey and functional zoning ===
In 2014, a research team from Heidelberg University conducted a digital mapping project using LiDAR, QGIS, and Digital Elevation Models (DEM), producing a highly detailed topographic map of the settlement. This survey confirmed the locations of previously excavated tholos tombs but also identified new architectural remains and road networks, which are believed to be associated with residential areas. The mapping process uncovered walls and terraces that had not been recorded in earlier excavations, suggesting the presence of domestic infrastructure, including retaining walls for terraced housing.

The application of QGIS analysis to the distribution of ceramic finds across the site revealed distinct concentration zones, indicating areas likely designated for ritual activities, domestic life, or public gatherings. The spatial differentiation of these concentrations supports the interpretation of Koumasa as a socially active settlement with specialized functional zones. Additionally, DEM analysis demonstrated that the settlement occupied an elevated and strategically advantageous location, overlooking the Mesara Plain. The natural terraces of Korakies hill provided both defensibility and visual control of the surrounding landscape, reinforcing the site's selection based on topographic benefits.

By integrating digital mapping data with the early 20th-century excavation records of Stefanos Xanthoudides, the Heidelberg team re-evaluated the site's spatial extent. Their reassessment proposed that Minoan activity at Koumasa spanned approximately 52,633 m^{2} (566,540 sq ft), a figure that significantly refines earlier estimates. This comprehensive digital approach not only clarified the settlement's architectural organization but also highlighted its long-term occupation and adaptation to the landscape.

== Burial architecture ==
=== Tholos tomb construction ===
The burial architecture at Koumasa is dominated by large circular tholos tombs constructed during the Prepalatial Minoan period. These tombs are built from locally sourced limestone, employing dry-stone construction techniques without the use of mortar. The stability of the tombs relies on the precise stacking of irregularly shaped stones, with the weight of the stones securing the structure. The walls consist of large limestone blocks, placed with skill to form the characteristic circular layout, while entrances are framed by long horizontal lintel stones, spanning the openings. Some tholos tombs, such as Tholos B, exhibit a double-walled construction, where a second outer wall encases the primary chamber, potentially for added stability or symbolic reasons.

Within the precinct area, a 2017 microarchaeological study identified traces of lime plaster and pigmented surfaces applied to architectural elements. The lime plaster was produced through the calcination of limestone, generating quicklime, which was then slaked with water and applied to walls and floors. The plaster surfaces typically exhibited a light color, creating a reflective background for painted decoration. Under microscopic examination, the diffuse and irregular boundaries between the pigment and the plaster substrate indicated the use of both al fresco (on wet plaster) and fresco secco (on dry plaster) painting techniques. These decorative treatments were identified in multiple architectural spaces, including corridors and annexes, suggesting that not only the burial chambers but also auxiliary areas were adorned with painted finishes.

=== Architectural continuity and ritual use ===
The chemical composition of the plaster at Koumasa shares notable similarities with that found at major Minoan centers like Knossos and Phaistos. These findings point to shared technological traditions across the Minoan world, combined with regional adaptations in the application and style of decorative materials. In Building Gamma, located within the cemetery complex, fragments of red-colored plaster floors were uncovered in secondary spaces, indicating a ceremonial use of these areas. The floor surfaces in these annexes were paved with cut slabs and coated with plaster, with layers of colored pigments applied in successive phases of use.

Archaeological investigations also demonstrate that many tombs underwent multiple construction and renovation phases. At Tholos B, stratigraphic analysis revealed blocked passages, reworked floor levels, and added annexes, which suggest that these burial structures were modified over time to accommodate shifting ritual practices or evolving burial needs. In several cases, corridor-like spaces adjoining main tombs were identified, with evidence of red-painted walls and blue plastered floors. These features were uncovered in the so-called sanctuary complex, located at a higher elevation above the main settlement, further connecting the architectural landscape of Koumasa to ritual and ceremonial functions.

In Room 1 of the sanctuary, a red plaster floor was overlaid with a later blue-painted floor at approximately the same level, suggesting four distinct construction phases. Each phase involved remodeling or redecorating, possibly aligning with changes in ritual use over time. These repeated modifications, alongside the application of decorative plaster and pigments in burial and ceremonial spaces, illustrate the architectural complexity and symbolic significance embedded in Koumasa's funerary landscape.

== Tomb astronomical alignment ==
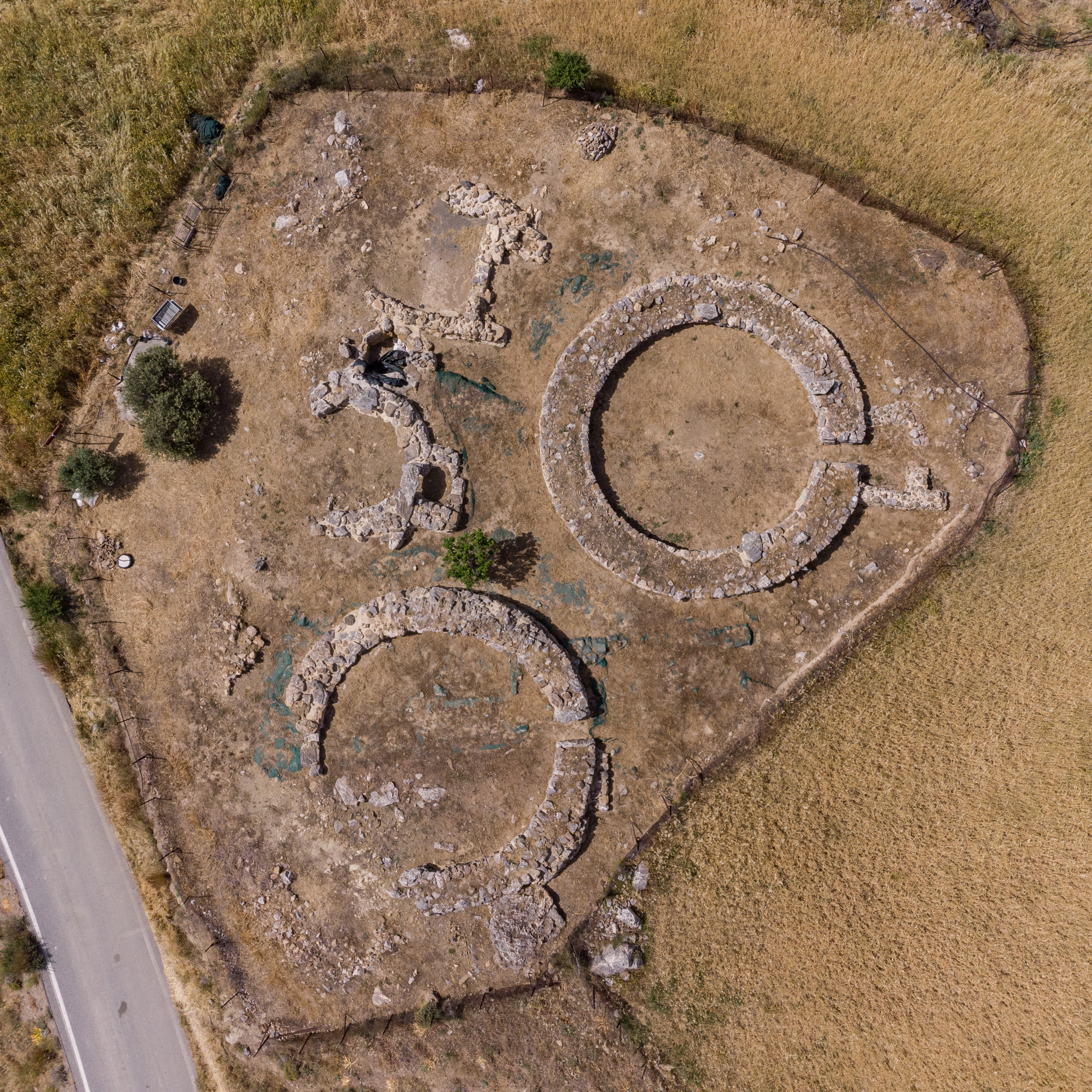
View of the Koumasa archaeological site, with Tholos B at the bottom and Tholos E above

=== Debate on the double entrance of Tholos B ===
One of the most debated architectural features at Koumasa is the suggestion that Tholos B possessed two entrances. In 1924, archaeologist Stefanos Xanthoudides described this as a unique case among Minoan tholos tombs, where typically only a single entrance exists. His plan of Tholos B illustrated two openings: one on the northeast and another on the northwest side. However, a 2012 re-evaluation using 3D scanning and photogrammetry questioned this interpretation. The analysis demonstrated that the supposed second entrance may have resulted from errors in earlier records or alterations during restoration work in the 1970s. The northwest wall exhibited irregularities, which may have been mistakenly recorded as an entrance due to collapsed masonry or reconstruction gaps. No physical traces of an entrance threshold, door slabs, or lintel stones were detected at this secondary position, strengthening the argument that the tomb was originally designed with a single entrance.

=== Astronomical alignment of Tholos E ===
Beyond architectural debates, the tombs at Koumasa also display intentional astronomical alignments. Tholos E, located northeast of the settlement, is aligned to capture the sunrise on the day of the summer solstice. The entrance faces 67° azimuth, oriented precisely northeast, which aligns with the point where the sun rises behind the Korakies hill on the solstice. This hill, positioned about 220 metres (720 ft) northeast of the tomb and standing approximately 31.6 metres (104 ft) higher than the tomb entrance, raises the local horizon to an altitude of 8.1°. This elevation alters the apparent position of the sun's rise, causing a visual shift compared to the flat horizon.

At 6:55 am on the summer solstice, the sun emerges at an azimuth of 67° and altitude of 8.1°, aligning precisely with the tomb's 1-metre-high entrance. As the sun climbs, direct sunlight enters the tomb and projects a beam of light that travels approximately 7 metres (23 ft) into the interior, illuminating about two-thirds of the tomb's 9.25-metre (30.3 ft) diameter chamber. This illumination event lasts for roughly 20 minutes, as the sun continues to ascend and passes beyond the tomb's visibility window. The duration and intensity of this light phenomenon indicate that the tomb's alignment was not accidental but the result of deliberate calculations based on solar observations and topographic knowledge.

=== Ritual meaning ===
Researchers propose that this alignment may have served ritualistic purposes, connecting the tomb's interior with the solar cycle. The summer solstice likely held significance in Minoan funerary practices. The entrance orientation and light penetration could symbolize renewal, transition, or the connection between life and the cosmos. Similar astronomical alignments have been documented at other Minoan and Aegean sites, reinforcing the idea that light and celestial events played a central role in the design of burial spaces.

== Mortuary practices ==
=== Cremation and lime use ===
Excavations at Tholos Beta in 2017 revealed multiple layers of burning deposits within the tomb, providing evidence of complex funerary practices at Koumasa. Micromorphological analysis identified charred organic material, human bone fragments, and lime residues across the tomb's floor surfaces and along sections of the walls. The burning layers were evenly distributed, suggesting that these deposits were not the result of isolated fires but rather systematic ritual burning associated with funerary activities. No complete human skeletons were recovered from the tomb. Instead, archaeologists found dispersed bone fragments, interwoven with burnt material, indicating that cremation or purification burning may have taken place inside the tomb. The presence of lime alongside the burnt remains suggests that lime was applied during these processes, potentially to assist in body decomposition or to serve a purification function.

The use of lime in funerary contexts is documented at other Minoan sites but appears particularly prominent at Koumasa. Its chemical traces were detected both on bone surfaces and within the burnt organic deposits, showing that lime may have been applied directly onto human remains as part of the funeral rites.

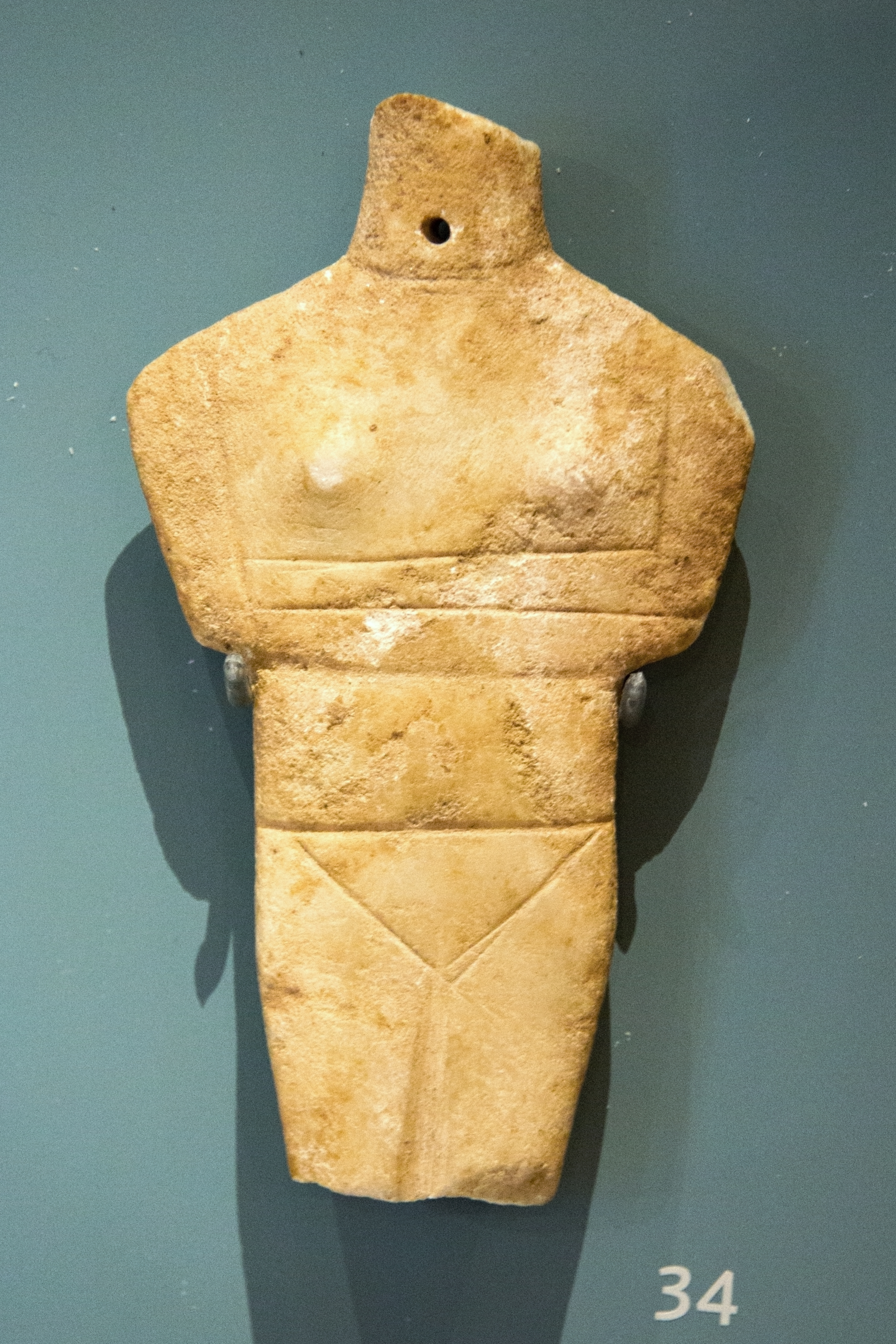
Headless folded-arm figurine from Koumasa

=== Secondary burials ===
Between 2016 and 2019, excavations across the Koumasa cemetery revealed widespread instances of secondary burial practices. In Tholos B and the lower levels of the cemetery's open areas, archaeologists recovered layers of human and animal bones, arranged in separate stratigraphic levels, suggesting the rearrangement or reburial of remains over extended periods. Outside Tholos B, a secondary burial deposit yielded an assemblage of 140 multicolored beads, seven stone seals, gold foil bands, a small rock crystal phiale, obsidian blades, and bronze tools. These objects, scattered across multiple layers, reflect the prolonged use of the burial area for ritual purposes and the accumulation of offerings over time.

=== Figurines and grave goods ===
In the entrance area of Tholos B, archaeologists found concentrations of intentionally broken pottery. This included decorated vessels and handleless conical cups from the Early Minoan IIA period. The fragments were carefully arranged in piles, indicating ritual breakage before deposition. Inside the tomb and its annexes, several figurine heads were recovered, including a fragment of a Koumasa-style marble folded-arm figurine, which typifies the Cycladic influence on local Minoan burial goods. In 2017, a Dokathismata-type Cycladic figurine head, retaining traces of pigment, was discovered among the burial deposits, suggesting that colored figurines were placed as grave goods during certain burial phases.

Other artifacts from the tombs, including pottery shards and figurines, exhibited red pigment traces, indicating that coloring or painting occurred prior to burial. In the southwest section of Tholos B, finds included a gold amulet shaped like a bull's head, a silver ring with linear decoration, and seals carved from hippopotamus ivory and local stone, all recovered from the same burial deposits that contained human and animal remains. The combination of grave goods, rearranged bones, and burnt layers illustrates the complex and multi-layered mortuary customs practiced at Koumasa.

== Koumasa-style figurines ==
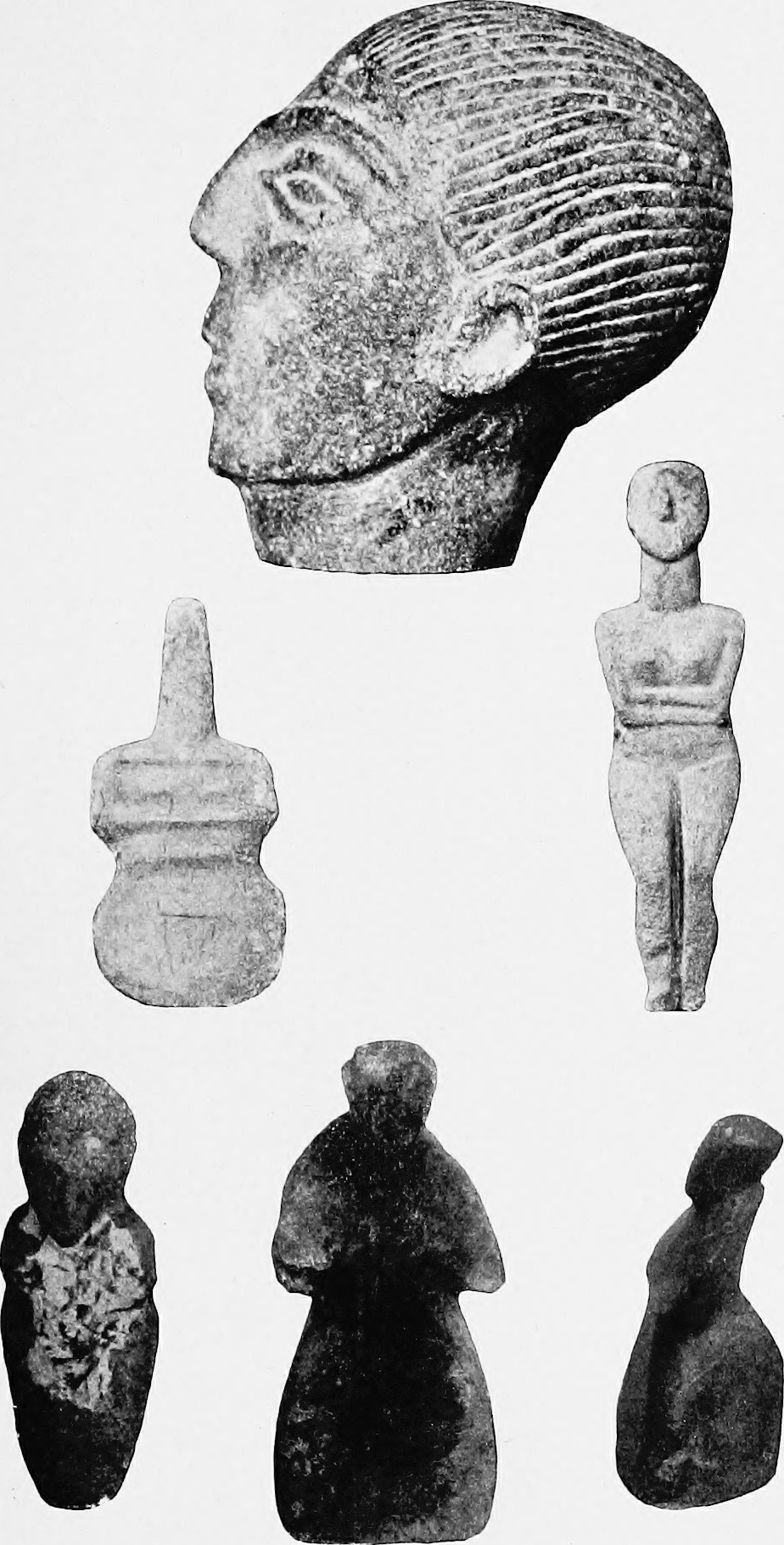
Figurines from Koumasa

=== Figurine types and formal characteristics ===
A series of folded-arm figurines (FAFs) have been discovered at Koumasa, representing what has come to be known as the “Koumasa type”. These figurines are generally made of marble and exhibit a combination of Cycladic influence and local Minoan stylistic features. They are typically shown with arms folded left over right, flat or slightly curved bodies, and minimal or absent facial details.

One figurine was recovered from below the eastern wall of the vestibule of Tholos Tomb A. This piece follows the canonical folded-arm pose, with long thin forearms crossing just above the waist. The breasts are indicated in low relief, and the pubic triangle is marked by a deep incision. The body is nearly flat, and the front surface is well-polished, while the back is left rougher. The figurine was found without a head and has no clear evidence of facial modeling.

Another figurine, found east of funerary Building Gamma, presents a cross-shaped outline, an angular chest, and bifurcated legs. The arms are marked only by a diagonal incision rather than sculpted limbs. Its simplified features and abstract proportions differ from Cycladic examples, suggesting a localized Koumasa adaptation. Notably, this figurine has a perforation near the neck area, likely for attaching the head with a string. This feature supports interpretations that the head may have been deliberately detached or removed during ritual deposition.

A third figurine was found inside the burial layer of Tholos B. It has a narrow torso, short flexed legs, and small protrusions on the back that may represent reduced arm stumps. The torso occupies only about one-seventh of the total height, and the chest is rendered in minimal form. The figurine's features are more closely aligned with the Spedos type but still deviate from standard forms, suggesting variation in workshop practices or symbolic meaning.

All three figurines were found decapitated. The neck perforation observed on the Gamma Building figurine indicates that its head was attached separately, possibly removed intentionally as part of funerary or ritual activity. The absence of heads in all three figurines points to shared ritual practices, where the removal or destruction of the head may have carried symbolic meaning.

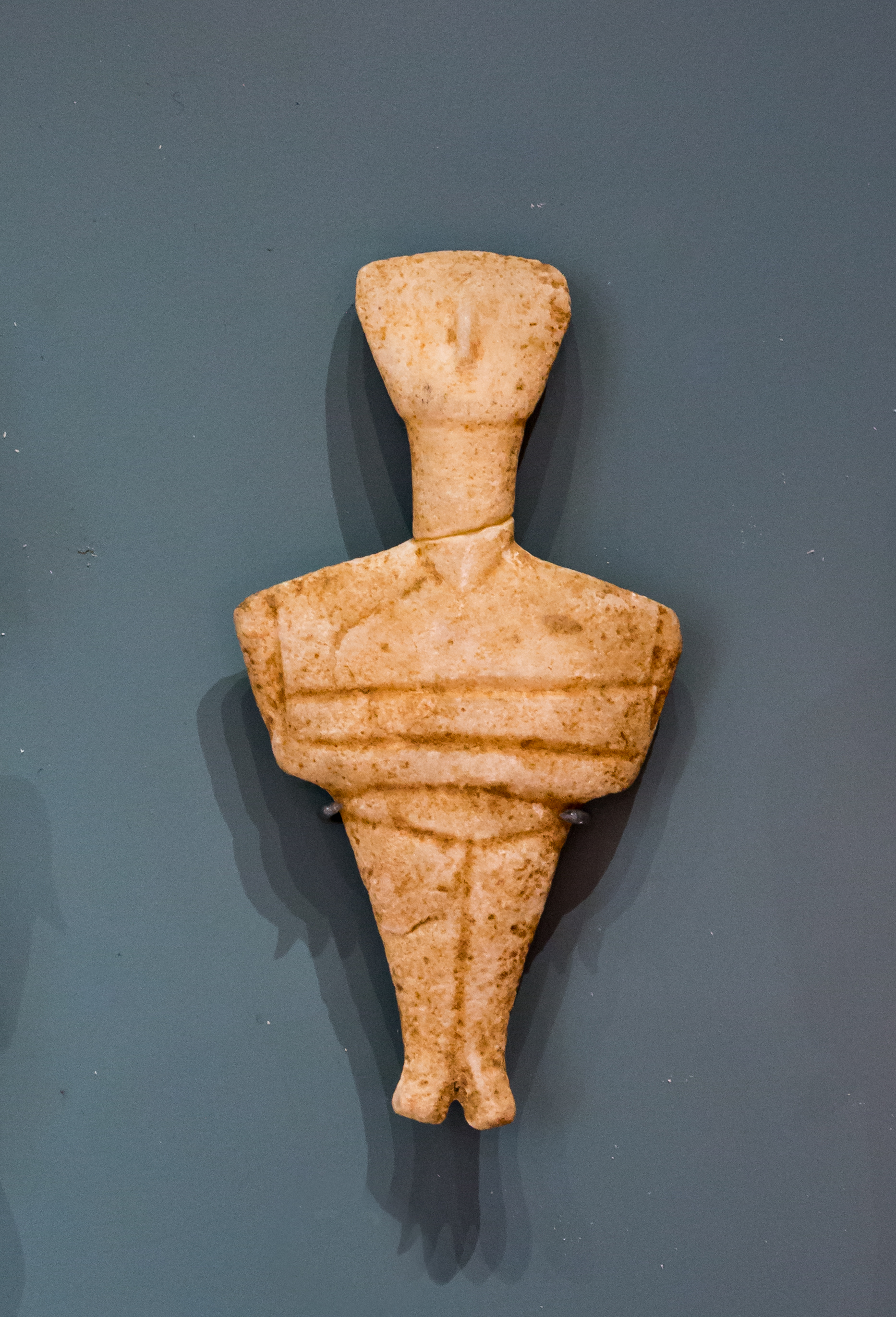
Koumasa type female figurine

=== Ritual function and symbolism ===
The stylistic variation among these figurines, even within the same site, highlights the complexity of local artistic production. While Cycladic influence is evident, the Koumasa examples diverge in carving techniques, body proportions, and levels of abstraction. These figurines illustrate the dynamic nature of cultural exchange and local reinterpretation in Early Bronze Age Crete. Scholars propose that the Koumasa-style figurines may encompass multiple subtypes, reflecting different artisan choices, regional workshop traditions, or even specific ritual functions depending on context of use. The distribution of these figurines across different burial sites within Koumasa, including Tholos A, Tholos B, and Building Gamma, further suggests that these objects played versatile roles in burial rituals, potentially acting as symbolic offerings, status markers, or ritual tools integrated into the social and religious fabric of the Koumasa community.

== Archaeological finds ==
Artifacts discovered at Koumasa include:

- Pottery of the Early Minoan IIA Koumasa style
- Clay and stone vases
- Seals
- Figurines
- Tools
- Three silver daggers
