= Ione Mylonas Shear =

American archaeologist (1936–2005)

- At her father's excavations on the citadel of Mycenae, c. 1960–1985
- Born: Ione Mylonas; February 19, 1936; Champaign, Illinois, United States
- Died: January 15, 2005 (aged 68); Princeton, New Jersey
- Spouse: T. Leslie Shear, Jr. (m. 1959)
- Father: George E. Mylonas

Academic background
- Education: Wellesley College; Bryn Mawr College
- Thesis: Mycenaean Domestic Architecture (1968)

Ione Mylonas Shear (née Mylonas; February 19, 1936 – January 15, 2005) was an American archaeologist who specialized in the domestic spaces of Mycenaean Greece. She was the daughter of George E. Mylonas, a Greek-born archaeologist teaching in the United States. Ione Mylonas was educated at Wellesley College and undertook graduate study in archaeology at Bryn Mawr College and at the American School of Classical Studies at Athens (ASCSA). She excavated under her father at Eleusis, at Isthmia in central Greece, and at Morgantina on Sicily. At Eleusis, she met the archaeologist T. Leslie Shear, Jr., whom she married in 1959.

Shear's publications included works on ancient Greek art and the Acropolis of Athens in addition to her primary field of Mycenaean archaeology. She published three monographs, including two in which she argued that the Homeric poems (the Iliad and Odyssey) were accurate reflections of the world of Bronze Age Greece. These beliefs, which she shared with her father, were generally rejected as outdated.

== Biography ==
Ione Mylonas was the daughter of the Greek archaeologist George E. Mylonas and his wife, Lena (née Papazoglou). (Note: Duhoux 2006, p. 519. For Lena Papazoglou, see "G. E. Mylonas, 89, Archeologist Who Led Greek Excavations, Dies". The New York Times. May 2, 1988. Section D, p. 14.) She was born on February 19, 1936, in Champaign, Illinois, and grew up in St. Louis, where her father was a professor at the Washington University. She was then educated at Wellesley College, a women's college in Massachusetts, before undertaking graduate study in archaeology at Bryn Mawr College, another women's college in Pennsylvania, and spent the 1959–1960 academic year at the American School of Classical Studies at Athens (ASCSA). Her doctoral dissertation, Mycenaean Domestic Architecture, was published in 1968. In her early career, she excavated at Eleusis in Attica, where her father was director, and at Isthmia, and in Sicily at Morgantina. At Isthmia in 1960, she supervised the excavation of human remains found in the so-called "Theater Cave".

She met the American archaeologist T. Leslie Shear, Jr. in 1956 when they were both excavating at Eleusis. The two married in 1959; they had two daughters, one of whom, Julia Shear, also became an archaeologist. (Note: "Obituary for Ione M. Shear". Bryn Mawr College. 2005. Archived from the original on September 29, 2007. For Julia Shear, see "Shear, Julia L., Ph.D." The Kolb Society of Fellows at the University of Pennsylvania Museum of Archaeology and Anthropology. Archived from the original on March 23, 2016.) Ione Shear joined the ASCSA's excavations of the Ancient Agora of Athens in 1967, (Note: The excavations were directed by her husband, T. Leslie Shear, Jr., from 1968.) and remained on the project until 1975. She returned to the excavations in 1979, and worked as a supervisor there until 1993. In 1981, she supervised with Margaret Miles the excavation of the Stoa Poikile. She published The Panagia Houses of Mycenae in 1987, in which she coined the term "three-room unit" to refer to the basic domestic structure common in Mycenaean archaeology.

In 2000, Shear published Tales of the Heroes: The Origins of the Homeric Texts, in which she argued that the Iliad and Odyssey had their origins in the Mycenaean Bronze Age but were definitively composed through oral dictation in sixth-century Athens. Reviewing the work in the Bryn Mawr Classical Review, Jonathan Burgess considered the argument creative but ultimately unconvincing, partly due to Shear's reliance on then-outdated hypotheses such as Spyridon Marinatos's conjecture that the Bronze Age volcanic eruption of Santorini was reflected in the later story of Atlantis, and partly due to her limited engagement with more recent scholarly approaches to the question of the poems' origins. Stephanie West, in The Classical Review, called its argument "more ingenious than persuasive".

She followed this in 2004 with Kingship in the Mycenaean World and Its Reflections in the Oral Tradition, which aimed to demonstrate, contrary to mainstream scholarly opinion but in line with the views of her father (to whom she dedicated the book), (Note: Duhoux 2006, p. 519. On George Mylonas's views of Homer, see Finley 1967.) that the Homeric poems represent an accurate portrayal of the Late Bronze Age world. In the American Journal of Archaeology, Erwin Cook rejected this argument as relying on special pleading, selecting examples from archaeology and within the Homeric poems which supported it and ignoring those which did not. Yves Duhoux, in L'Antiquité Classique, similarly rejected the argument for ignoring too many discrepancies between the poems and the archaeological record, while James Whitley, in The Classical Review, criticized Shear for misunderstanding previous approaches to the problem (particularly that of Moses Finley) and ignoring more recent ones, particularly that of Anthony Snodgrass; John Bennet called Shear's views "extreme". Victor Parker, in Gnomon, considered Shear's thesis broadly correct, disagreeing only in what he considered to be points of detail.

Shear was a life member of the Archaeological Institute of America. She died on January 15, 2005, of cancer, at the University Medical Center in Princeton, and was buried in Princeton Cemetery. A fellowship in her name was established at the ASCSA: as of 2019, this offered graduate students a stipend of $11,500 and accommodation at the school to study Mycenaean or Athenian archaeology.

== Published works ==
- Shear, Ione Mylonas (1963). "Kallikrates". Hesperia. 32 (4): 375–424. ISSN 0018-098X. JSTOR 147361.
- — (1968). Mycenaean Domestic Architecture (Ph.D. thesis). Bryn Mawr College.
- — (1976). "Thorikos, Attica, Greece". In Stillwell, Richard (ed.). The Princeton Encyclopedia of Classical Sites. Princeton University Press. ISBN 0-691-03542-3.
- — (1987). The Panagia Houses at Mycenae. University Museum Monographs. Vol. 68. Philadelphia: University of Pennsylvania Museum of Archaeology. pp. 112–113. OCLC 16524438.
- — (1998). "Bellerophon Tablets from the Mycenaean World? A Tale of Seven Bronze Hinges". Journal of Hellenic Studies. 118: 187–189. doi:10.2307/632241. ISSN 0075-4269. JSTOR 632241.
- — (1999). "Maidens in Greek Architecture: The Origin of the 'Caryatids'". Bulletin de Correspondance Hellénique. 123 (1): 65–85. doi:10.3406/bch.1999.7211. ISSN 0007-4217.
- — (1999). "The Western Approach to the Athenian Akropolis". The Journal of Hellenic Studies. 119: 86–127. doi:10.2307/632313. ISSN 0075-4269. JSTOR 632313.
- — (2000). "Review: Excavations on the Acropolis of Midea". American Journal of Archaeology. 104 (1): 133–134. doi:10.2307/506802. ISSN 0002-9114. JSTOR 506802.
- — (2000). Tales of Heroes. The Origins of the Homeric Texts. New York and Athens: A. D. Caratzas. ISBN 0-89241-537-1.
- — (2002). "Mycenaean Centaurs at Ugarit". The Journal of Hellenic Studies. 122: 147–153. doi:10.2307/3246210. ISSN 0075-4269. JSTOR 3246210.
- — (2004). Kingship in the Mycenaean World and Its Reflections in the Oral Tradition. Prehistory Monographs. Philadelphia: INSTAP Academic Press. doi:10.2307/j.ctt3fgvs0. ISBN 1-931534-12-8. (Note: For reviews, see Cook 2006, Duhoux 2006, Whitley 2006 and Parker 2007.)
- — (2004). "Mycenaean Centaurs Still". The Journal of Hellenic Studies. 124: 166–168. doi:10.2307/3246157. ISSN 0075-4269. JSTOR 3246157.

== Works cited ==
- Bennet, John (2008). "The Aegean Bronze Age". In Scheidel, Walter; Morris, Ian; Saller, Richard P. (eds.). The Cambridge Economic History of the Greco-Roman World: Part II – Early Mediterranean Economies and the Near East. Cambridge University Press. pp. 173–210. doi:10.1017/CHOL9780521780537. ISBN 978-0-521-78053-7.
- Burgess, Jonathan (October 18, 2002). "Review: Tales of Heroes: The Origins of the Homeric Texts". Bryn Mawr Classical Review.
- Cook, Erwin (2006). "Review: Kingship in the Mycenaean World and Its Reflections in the Oral Tradition by Ione Mylonas Shear". American Journal of Archaeology. 110 (4): 666–667. doi:10.1086/AJS40025067. ISSN 0002-9114. JSTOR 40025067.
- Duhoux, Yves (2006). "Kingship in the Mycenaean World and Its Reflections in the Oral Tradition (Prehistory Monographs, 13) by Ione Mylonas Shear". L'Antiquité Classique. 75: 518–520. ISSN 0770-2817. JSTOR 41665498.
- Finley, Moses (August 3, 1967). "Digging the Trojans". New York Review of Books.
- Jazwa, Kyle A. (2019). "Building Change: Domestic Architecture and Identity During the Bronze Age to Iron Age Transition". In Scahill, David; Sapirstein, Philip (eds.). New Directions and Paradigms for the Study of Greek Architecture: Interdisciplinary Dialogues in the Field. Leiden: Brill. pp. 151–167. ISBN 978-90-04-41665-9.
- Meritt, Lucy Shoe (1984). History of the American School of Classical Studies at Athens, 1939–1980 (PDF). Princeton: American School of Classical Studies at Athens. ISBN 0-87661-942-1.
- Parker, Victor (2007). "Reviewed Work: Kingship in the Mycenaean World and Its Reflections in the Oral Tradition by Ione Mylonas Shear". Gnomon. 79 (7): 660–662. ISSN 0017-1417. JSTOR 40494422.
- Rife, Joseph L (2012). Isthmia, Volume IX, The Roman and Byzantine Graves and Human Remains: Excavations by the University of Chicago, Under the Auspices of the American School of Classical Studies at Athens. Princeton: American School of Classical Studies at Athens. ISBN 978-0-87661-939-1.
- Saxon, Jamie (October 7, 2022). "T. Leslie Shear Jr., classical archaeologist, 'rigorous scholar' and 'inspiring teacher,' dies at 84". Princeton University.
- Shear, T. Leslie (1984). "The Athenian Agora: Excavations of 1980–1982". Hesperia. 53 (1): 5–19. ISSN 0018-098X. JSTOR 147938.
- Tournavitou, Iphiyenia (2006). "A Mycenaean Building Reconsidered: The Case of the West House at Mycenae". Annual of the British School at Athens. 101: 217–267. doi:10.1017/S0068245400021328. ISSN 0068-2454.
- West, Stephanie (2003). "Notes: I. M. Shear: Tales of Heroes: The Origins of the Homeric Texts" (PDF). The Classical Review. 53 (1): 247. doi:10.1093/cr/53.1.247. ISSN 0009-840X.
- Whitley, James (2006). "Review: Mycenaean Kingship". The Classical Review. 56 (2): 378–379. doi:10.1017/S0009840X06002022. ISSN 0009-840X. JSTOR 3873691.
