= Polythea, Trikala =

Polythea Πολυθέα
- Community
- Location within Greece
- Coordinates: 39°35.9′N 21°17.7′E
- Country: Greece
- Administrative region: Thessaly
- Regional unit: Trikala
- Municipality: Meteora
- Municipal unit: Aspropotamos

Area
  - Community: 24.293 km^{2} (9.380 sq mi)
- Elevation: 1,100 m (3,600 ft)

Population (2021)
  - Community: 3
  - Density: 0.12/km^{2} (0.32/sq mi)
- Time zone: UTC+2 (EET)
  - Summer (DST): UTC+3 (EEST)
- Postal code: 420 36
- Area code: +30-2432
- Vehicle registration: TK

Polythea (Greek: Πολυθέα) is a village and a community of the Meteora municipality. Before the 2011 local government reform it was part of the community of Aspropotamos, of which it was a communal district. The 2021 census recorded 3 residents in the village. The community of Polythea covers an area of 24.293 km^{2}.

== See also ==
- List of settlements in the Trikala regional unit
