= Michael Cosmopoulos =

Greek archaeologist

Michael Basil Cosmopoulos (Greek: Μιχαήλ Βασιλείου Κοσμόπουλος; born 1963) is Professor of Greek History and Archaeology with the Department of Anthropology and Archaeology; and Holder of the Endowed Professorship in Greek Studies at the University of Missouri–St. Louis. He is a Fellow of the St. Louis Academy of Science, a Fellow of the Royal Society of Canada, a member of the Athens Academy of Arts and Sciences, of the European Academy of Sciences and Arts, and of the American Academy of Arts and Sciences. In 2022 he was decorated by the president of Greece with the Gold Cross of the Order of Phoenix.

== Early life and education ==
He was born in Athens in 1963 and graduated from the Anavryta Magnet High School. He studied archaeology, Ancient History, Anthropology, and Classical Languages at the University of Athens (B.A., summa cum laude, 1981), the University of Sorbonne-Paris IV (D.E.U.G., 1983), and Washington University in St. Louis (M.A. 1986, Ph.D. 1991), where he was taught by George E. Mylonas, the excavator of Eleusis. He also holds a Diploma in Underwater Archaeology from the Council of Europe (1984).

== University career ==
In 1989, at the age of 26, he was appointed assistant professor of Classical Studies and Anthropology at the University of Manitoba in Winnipeg, Canada, where he taught a wide range of subjects and received two teaching awards. At the University of Manitoba he founded the Center for Hellenic Civilization.

In August 2001 he moved to St. Louis to take up the Hellenic Government-Karakas Family Foundation Endowed Professorship of Greek Studies as Professor of History and Archaeology with the Department of Anthropology and Archaeology at the University of Missouri–St. Louis.

== Archaeological work ==
He has excavated at various archaeological sites in Greece and Ukraine, including Mycenae, Epidavros, Ancient Corinth, Naxos, Ithaca, Oropos and Olbia (now Berezan) in the Black Sea. He is the director of Archaeological Research in Eleusis and since 1999 he directs the excavations of the Archaeological Society of Athens at Iklaina Messenia (IK.A.P.: Iklaina Archaeological Project) near Pylos. His excavations in Iklaina brought to light an important center of Mycenaean civilization with Cyclopean walls, frescoes, paved streets, and the oldest record of Linear B of Mainland Greece.

== Greek Studies ==
Cosmopoulos has been actively involved in the dissemination of Greek Studies in North America. In Canada, in addition to the Hellenic Center at the University of Manitoba, he founded the Pan-Macedonian Association of Manitoba, and the Canadian Committee for the Restitution of the Parthenon Marbles.

In the United States, he created the University of Missouri–St. Louis Greek Studies Program, with annual enrollments of 300 students and one of the few Degrees of Greek Studies in North America. He also founded the Nicholas and Theodora Matsakis Center for Hellenic Culture. He has organized many international conferences, public lectures, and events to inform the Canadian and US public on issues of Greek culture. He has given hundreds of lectures on Greek archaeology issues in Canada, United States, Greece, Germany, and the UK.

For his research accomplishments he has been awarded the Canada Rh Award for Outstanding Contributions to Scholarship and Research in the Humanities. He has also received numerous teaching awards, including the Archaeological Institute of America Award for Excellence in Teaching.

== Publications ==
Cosmopoulos has published 16 books and more than 100 articles and scholarly papers on the archaeology, culture, and socio-political history of ancient Greece. His books include:

- 2018: Iklaina. The Monumental Buildings. ISBN 978-618-5047-39-9.
- 2016: The Political Geography of a Mycenaean District. The Archaeological Survey at Iklaina. ISBN 978-618-5047-27-6.
- 2015: Bronze Age Eleusis and the Origins of the Eleusinian Mysteries. Cambridge University Press, Cambridge. ISBN 9781107010994.
- 2014: The Sanctuary of Demeter at Eleusis. The Bronze Age, Vols. I-II. Library of the Athens Archaeological Society 295–296, Athens. ISBN 9786185047153.
- 2007: Experiencing War: Trauma and Society in Ancient Greece and Today. Ares Publishers, Chicago. ISBN 978-0056064973.
- 2004: The Parthenon and Its Sculptures. Cambridge University Press, Cambridge ISBN 978-0521836739.
- 2004: Η Νάξος και το Κρητομυκηναϊκό Αιγαίο. Στρωματογραφία, Κεραμική και Οικονομική Οργάνωση του Υστεροελλαδικού Οικισμού στη Γρόττα. Πανεπιστήμιο Αθηνών, Δημοσιεύματα Περιοδικού Αρχαιογνωσία, Αρ. 3 ([2]) ISBN 9789608313583
- 2003: Greek Mysteries. The Archaeology and Ritual of Greek Secret Cults. Routledge, London and New York ISBN 978-0415248730. Greek translation: Ελληνικά Μυστήρια. Αρχαιολογία και Τελετουργικό των Αρχαίων Ελληνικών Μυστηριακών Λατρειών, Eκδόσεις Ενάλιος, Αθήνα 2007 ISBN 978-960-536-277-5
- 2001: The Rural History of Ancient Greek City-States: the Oropos Survey Project. British Archaeological Reports-International Series 1001, Oxford ISBN 9781841712826
- 2001–2008: Journal of Modern Hellenism (co-editor, with A. Gerolymatos, H. Psomiades, C. Ioannides)
- 1992: Macedonia. An Introduction to its Political History. Manitoba Studies in Classical Civilization. Winnipeg ISBN 978-0969669104.
- 1991: The Early Bronze 2 in the Aegean. Studies in Mediterranean Archaeology XCVIII. Jonsered.ISBN 978-9170810190.
- 1984: Νεολιθική Μικρά Ασία. Αθήνα
- 1982: Αρχαικα Εργαστήρια Γλυπτικής. Η Σάμος. Αθήνα
- 1981: Υστεροελλαδικοί Θαλαμωτοί Τάφοι. Αθήνα
- 1979: Περικλής. Εκδόσεις Παπαδήμα. Αθήνα.
