= Anthousa, Trikala =

Anthousa Ανθούσα
- Community
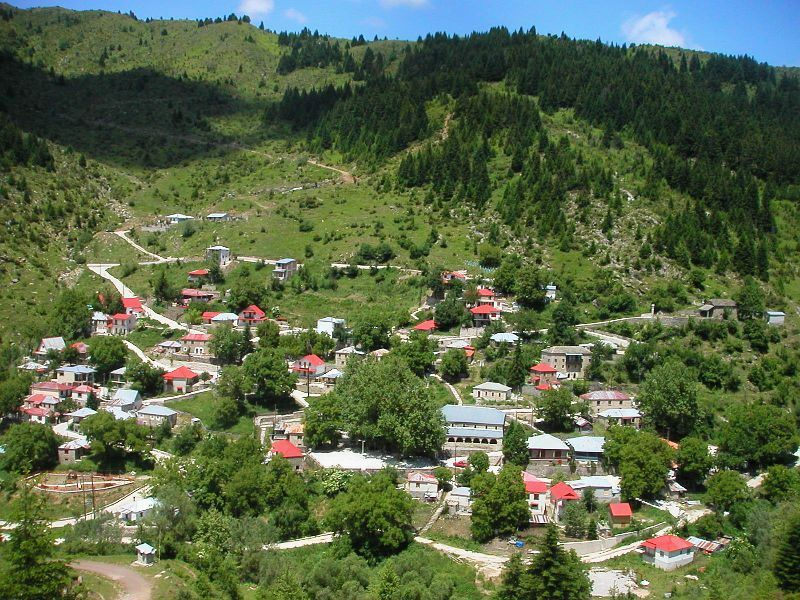
- View of Anthousa village

- Location within Greece
- Coordinates: 39°40′N 21°13′E
- Country: Greece
- Administrative region: Thessaly
- Regional unit: Trikala
- Municipality: Meteora
- Municipal unit: Aspropotamos

Area
  - Community: 38.723 km^{2} (14.951 sq mi)

Population (2021)
  - Community: 10
  - Density: 0.26/km^{2} (0.67/sq mi)
- Time zone: UTC+2 (EET)
  - Summer (DST): UTC+3 (EEST)
- Postal code: 420 36
- Area code: +30-2432
- Vehicle registration: ΤΚ

Anthousa (Greek: Ανθούσα, before 1928: Λεπενίτσα - Lepenitsa) is an Aromanian (Vlach) village in the municipal unit of Aspropotamos in the western part of the Trikala regional unit, Greece. It is located in the southern Pindus mountains, 36 km west of Kalambaka, and 12 km south of Metsovo. The 2021 census recorded 10 residents in Anthousa. The community of Anthousa covers an area of 38.723 km^{2}.

== Population ==
Year	Population
1981	34
1991	37
2001	114
2011	61
2021	10

== See also ==
- List of settlements in the Trikala regional unit
