= Agia Paraskevi, Aspropotamos =

Agia Paraskevi Αγία Παρασκευή
- Community
- Location within Greece
- Coordinates: 39°34.1′N 21°15.5′E
- Country: Greece
- Administrative region: Thessaly
- Regional unit: Trikala
- Municipality: Meteora
- Municipal unit: Aspropotamos

Area
  - Community: 29.641 km^{2} (11.444 sq mi)
- Elevation: 900 m (3,000 ft)

Population (2021)
  - Community: 30
  - Density: 1.0/km^{2} (2.6/sq mi)
- Time zone: UTC+2 (EET)
  - Summer (DST): UTC+3 (EEST)
- Postal code: 420 37
- Area code: +30-2432
- Vehicle registration: TK

Agia Paraskevi (Greek: Αγία Παρασκευή, Aromanian: Giúrgea) is a village and a community of the Meteora municipality. Before the 2011 local government reform it was part of the community of Aspropotamos, of which it was a communal district. Now Aspropotamos is a municiplal unit. The 2021 census recorded 30 permanent residents in the village. In the summer season the number expands considerably as former residents and other tourists come to vacation. The community of Agia Paraskevi covers an area of 29.641 km^{2}.

As might be hypothesized from the low population, Agia Paraskevi is a remote mountain village, formerly difficult of access, but today fairly modern accessed by automobiles and good roads. It is on the right, or western bank, of the ravine through which the Achelous River flows in a N-S direction. Not being near any naturally flat land, the village takes advantage of the sloping, uneven terrain with numerous terraces and retaining walls. The red roofs add considerable color to the well-fitted stonework and light stucco walls.

== Aromanians of Agia Paraskevi ==
Ag. Paraskevi was not the original name. Being Christian, in 1955 they adopted the name of Saint Paraskevi, a female healer and martyr of the Roman Empire, probably after a nearby church. The name was in common use for churches and toponyms. Paraskevi means Friday in Greek. Apparently the saint was named by her parents after the day of the week on which she was born. Inheriting a fortune from her parents, she used it to establish herself as a minister and advance the cause of Christianity, which brought her to the attention of the pagan emperors.

It is always difficult to determine how much of saint stories are true, and how much fiction, even to church investigators appointed to examine them. In her story, she was tortured and boiled in oil for her Christianity by Antoninus Pius, even though he offered to marry her if she gave up Christianity. Seeing that she appeared not to suffer, he questioned how hot the oil was. She threw some in his face, blinding him. Subsequently she restored his sight causing him to convert to Christianity. Under Marcus Aurelius, however, having been tortured by that emperor, and having smashed pagan idols with a magical word, she was beheaded. These two emperors were among "good emperors" known for their humane and enlightened reigns.

Before the saintly name the village was called Tzourtzia (Giurgia) after the name of a waterfall (or vice versa) 119 m (390 ft) high at 2.63 km (1.63 mi) up the Kali Pini and Kourtziotikos Rivers. The stream connects with the Acheloos River at the village. Visitors may swim in the extensive plunge pool if they hike the distance from the village to the waterfall over a choice of trails. White water boating or rafting is available for the return journey. Thus the village profits from the tourists, to whom they offer advice, support, and terraced cafes.

The falls were named by the Aromanian language-speaking settlers, ethnic Vlachs. Aromanian is a Romance language of the Balkans south of the Danube. It began with the Romanization in the 3rd century of Celtic tribes displaced to the south by Germanic and Hungarian tribes. A major settlement area was the province of Wallachia in Romania. Aromanian is closely related to Romanian. Giurgia is generally conceded to be the name George, as in the Romanian city, Giurgiu, although whether short for an original Saint George remains unknown.

By the 5th-7th centuries the Vlachs (Vlach=Wallach) were nomadic tribes wandering the Balkans and conflicting with other peoples there. They settled temporarily at first in mountainous pockets of Greece, Albania, and Bulgaria. Roman and then Byzantine control over them in these inaccessible locations was marginal. Giurgia was one of these locations. They mainly wintered there and kept sheep on the mountains during the season. Their position with respect to the Greeks cannot be described as full assimilation, as they kept a Vlach identity. They were bilingual, speaking both Greek and Vlachko. They adopted Greek Christianity, supporting the monasteries of Meterora. They are loyal Greek nationals.

The Vlachs, however, never founded a nation of their own. Consequently in modern times they have migrated to quite a few nations, participating in a Vlach diaspora. Specifically a population of Vlachs from Agia Paraskevi as Greeks can be found in eastern Massachusetts and Annapolis, Maryland, with many notable figures.

The local Aromanians of Agia Paraskevi call themselves in singular armâń gurțań. In this armâń can be seen the native word for English Aromanian. A particularity of the Aromanian dialect in Agia Paraskevi, who speak a Pindus dialect, is that they have preserved the Latin word for flower, floare, as opposed to the majority of Aromanians that call it lilice or chitcă. They are all Orthodox Christians who worship at the Meteora monasteries located nearby to the village.

== History of the Vlachs of Pindus ==
=== The Vlachs come to Greece ===
The Greeks of ancient Epirus, Thessaly, and Macedonia have succumbed to ethnic invasions from the north, just as the indigenous inhabitants of the Balkans once succumbed to the Indo-European invaders who became the proto-Greeks. The two principal ethnic groups that took over ancient Greek country are the Slavs and the Vlachs. The Slavs have managed to remain within the confines of Slavic-speaking countries, such as Serbia, Bulgaria, and North Macedonia. Similarly the Turks were in Greece for a time but after the Greek revolution maintained themselves in a different nation. There are no pockets of Slavic or Turkish speakers within Greece, although many Greek speakers have ancestors deriving from those backgrounds.

The Vlachs, however, driven by transhumance and permitted by the favor of the Roman Empire, whose language they spoke, spread over what became Rumelia under the Ottoman Empire. In the 12th century they formed a puppet state of the Byzantines called Great Vlachia or just Vlakia. In the 14th century it had subsumed all of Thessaly. This was undoubtedly the time when the chief Vlach pockets were formed in what was soon to become Rumelia. By the 15th century Great Vlachia was out of Greece altogether and applied only to the densest concentration of Vlachs, Wallachia.

Meanwhile the Vlachs were located in 80 villages of the Pindus Mountains. There are other pockets in Thessaly and Macedonia, some in Albania, and some in North Macedonia. In the late 19th century there were about 150,000 belligerent and confident Vlachs. In 2003 there were 20,000 unself-confident Vlachs, trying to hide their identity, and even to rid themselves of it. Many important persons in Greek politics have been secret Vlachs. This has been the fate of many other minority ethnic groups that aspire to nationality and fail. In this case the change in fortune resulted from a divisive ideological split that developed after WWI.

== See also ==
- List of settlements in the Trikala regional unit
