= Elizabeth Schofield =

American archaeologist

- Born: Elizabeth Virginia Milburn; 1935; United States
- Died: 2005 (aged 69–70); Cambridge, United Kingdom

Academic background
- Education: University of Cincinnati

Academic work
- Discipline: Archaeology
- Institutions: Cornell University; St John's College, Cambridge

Elizabeth Virginia Schofield (1935–2005) was a British–American archaeologist and classical scholar.

== Career ==
Schofield attended Cheltenham Ladies' College in the UK before studying in the United States at Wilson College in Pennsylvania. She followed her college studies with a master's degree from Washington State University and then, in 1959, a PhD at the University of Cincinnati under Jack Caskey.

Schofield taught at Cornell University before moving with her partner and family to a teaching position at St John's College, Cambridge. Academically, she focused full-time on excavations at Kea; first with Jack Caskey and then directing the archaeological project there after Caskey's death.

In 2005 she was awarded the distinguished service award by the College of Arts and Sciences at the University of Cincinnati.

== Select publications ==
- Schofield, Elizabeth (1990). "Conical Cups in Context". In Betancourt, Paul; Karageorghis, Vassos; Laffineur, Robert; Niemeier, Wolf-Dietrich (eds.). MELETEMATA: Studies in Aegean Archaeology Presented to Malcolm H. Wiener as He Enters his 65th year. Aegeum. Vol. 20. pp. 757–760. ISBN 1935488147.
- — (1990). "Evidence for Household Industries on Thera and Kea". In Hardy, D.A; Doumas, Christos G.; Sakellarakis, J.A.; Warren, Peter M. (eds.). Thera and the Aegean World III, Vol I: Archaeology, Proceedings of the Third International Congress Santorini, Greece 3–9 September 1989. London: The Thera Foundation. pp. 201–211. ISBN 0950613347.
- — (2011). Keos: Results of Excavations Conducted by the University of Cincinnati Under the Auspices of the American School of Classical Studies at Athens. Vol. X: Ayia Irini: The Western Sector. Darmstadt: Philipp Von Zabern Verlag. ISBN 9783805343336.
