= Aspropotamos, Trikala =

Aspropotamos Ασπροπόταμος
- Municipal unit
- Location within the regional unit

- Location within Greece
- Coordinates: 39°38′N 21°18′E
- Country: Greece
- Administrative region: Thessaly
- Regional unit: Trikala
- Municipality: Meteora

Area
  - Municipal unit: 297.082 km^{2} (114.704 sq mi)

Population (2021)
  - Municipal unit: 218
  - Municipal unit density: 0.734/km^{2} (1.90/sq mi)
- Time zone: UTC+2 (EET)
  - Summer (DST): UTC+3 (EEST)
- Postal code: 420 36, 420 37
- Area code: +30-2432
- Vehicle registration: TK

Aspropotamos (Greek: Ασπροπόταμος meaning "white river") is a former community in the Trikala regional unit, Thessaly, Greece. Since the 2011 local government reform it is part of the municipality Meteora, of which it is a municipal unit. The 2021 census recorded 218 residents in the municipal unit. The seat of the community was in Kallirroi.

== Name ==
The community was named after the river Aspropotamos, a tributary of the Acheloos.

== Geography ==
Aspropotamos is located in the southern Pindus mountains, in the westernmost part of Trikala regional unit, about 40 km west of Trikala and 20 km southeast of Metsovo. Aspropotamos covers an area of 297.082 km^{2}. The largest community in the municipal unit is Kallirroi (pop. 55).

== Subdivisions ==
The municipal unit Aspropotamos is subdivided into the following communities (constituent villages in parentheses):

- Agia Paraskevi
- Anthousa
- Chaliki
- Kallirroi
- Katafyto (Katafyto, Milia)
- Krania (Krania, Doliana, Konakia)
- Polythea
- Stefani

== Population ==
Year	Population
1991	1,028
2001	1,404
2011	419
2021	218

== See also ==
- List of settlements in the Trikala regional unit
