= Hazel D. Hansen =

American classicist

- Born: September 28, 1899
- Died: December 19, 1962 (aged 63)

Academic background
- Education: Stanford University
- Thesis: Early civilization in thessaly (1926)

Hazel Dorothy Hansen (28 September 1899 – 19 December 1962) was a professor at Stanford University. She was an American classicist known for her work in Skyros, Greece.

== Early life and education ==
Hansen was born was born in California 28 September 1899. Her father was a foundryman. Hansen graduated from the San Mateo Union High School and later taught Latin at the San Mateo Junior College.

She joined Stanford University in 1916 and received her B.A. and M.A. in 1920 and 1921 respectively with her Master's thesis about "Study of the Persians of Aeschylus." Hansen continued her studies at the American School of Classical Studies, Athens, Greece between the years 1922 to 1925. She received her Ph.D. from Stanford University in 1926 with her dissertation entitled "Early Civilisation in Thessaly", which was later published as a book in 1933. In the year 1927-28 she received the Alice Freeman Palmer Fellowship of the American Association of University Women

== Career ==
In 1928, she became an instructor in the Department of Classics at Stanford University. Hansen was known for her work in the field of Aegean prehistory. In 1931 was became an assistant professor at Stanford University. She was promoted to associate professor in 1935, and to full professor in 1940.

In 1960 Hansen founded the Stanford branch of the American Institute of Archaeology.

== Research ==
Hansen is known for her investigations into the history of Greece. Several trips to Thessaly in the years 1923-1924 led to her work focus in Thessalian topography and prehistory. Hansen's interest on the Greek island Skyros, led her to spend many summers cataloguing and excavating the island. Through her work the island of Skyros was able to establish its first museum displaying the excavations of pottery and other objects which she had found in graves. The Archaeological Service of the Greek Ministry asked Hansen to write a guidebook for the Skyros museum. In the 1930s, Hansen talked about her work on an excavation in Athens.

Hansen also worked with students at Stanford to assemble shards of pottery, the resulting pieces were collected into a workshop at Stanford.

Hansen died on 19 December 1962 at the Stanford Hospital in Palo Alto, due to an ongoing heart condition.

== Selected publications ==
- Hansen, Hazel D. (1971). Early civilization in Thessaly. OCLC 686449.
- Hansen, Hazel D. (1937). "The Prehistoric Pottery on the North Slope of the Acropolis, 1937". Hesperia: The Journal of the American School of Classical Studies at Athens. 6 (4): 539–570. ISSN 0018-098X. JSTOR 146470.

== Honors and awards ==
Hansen was named an honorary Greek citizen of Skyros. Hansen was a fellow of the Archaeological Institute of America.

== Bibliography ==
- Vogeikoff-Brogan, Natalia, et Leda Costaki. « Hazel D. Hansen: A forgotten American prehistorian ». Pencil and Dust. Women Who Shaped Archaeology in Greece and the Greek World, Sylviane Déderix and Maguelone Bastide (eds), École française d’Athènes, 2025, https://doi.org/10.4000/15xfq.
