= Casey Dué Hackney =

Academic background
- Education: Brown University (BA); Harvard University (MA, PhD)

Academic work
- Discipline: Classics
- Institutions: University of Houston

Casey Dué Hackney, sometimes cited or referred to as Casey Dué, is an American classicist. She is a professor of classical studies at the University of Houston, and the Executive Editor for the Center for Hellenic Studies. Her research interests centre around Homeric poetry, Greek tragedy and Greek oral traditions.

== Education ==
Dué Hackney received her B.A. in classical philology from Brown University in 1996, then her M.A. and Ph.D. from Harvard University in 1998 and 2001, respectively.

== Career ==
Dué Hackney joined the department of Modern and Classical Languages at the University of Houston in 2002. She held a Center for Hellenic Studies fellowship in the academic year 2004–2005.

Since 2001, Dué Hackney has been the co-editor of the Homer Multitext Project, incorporating the older Homer & the Papyri project, with Mary Ebbott at the Center for Hellenic Studies. This project aims to offer a digital edition of Homer through free access to a library of texts and images of or relating to manuscripts of the Iliad or the Odyssey. In 2013, Dué Hackney was awarded a three-year grant from the National Endowment for the Humanities, as co-principal investigator with Ebbott, for a project to further the progress of the Homer Multitext Project, by linking a digital edition of Venetus A, the oldest complete extant manuscript of the Iliad, with images of the manuscript.

Dué Hackney is a co-leader of the University of Houston arm of the Texas Digital Humanities Consortium, an organisation for digital humanities in four Texas-based universities, begun in 2014.

== Selected bibliography ==
- Homeric Variations on a Lament by Briseis (Lanham, Md.: Rowman and Littlefield Press, 2002). ISBN 0-7425-2219-9
- "Homer's Post-Classical Legacy." in J. M. Foley, ed., A Companion to Ancient Epic (Oxford: Blackwell, 2005).
- The Captive Woman’s Lament in Greek Tragedy (Austin: University of Texas Press, 2006). ISBN 0-292-70946-3
- (ed.) Recapturing a Homeric Legacy: Images and Insights from the Venetus A Manuscript of the Iliad (Cambridge, MA: Harvard University Press, 2009). ISBN 978-0-674-03202-6
- (with Mary Ebbott) Iliad 10 and the Poetics of Ambush: A Multitext Edition with Essays and Commentary (Cambridge, MA: Harvard University Press, 2010). ISBN 978-0674035591
- Achilles Unbound: Multiformity and Tradition in the Homeric Epics (Cambridge, MA: Harvard University Press, 2019). ISBN 9780674987364
