= Georgios Panagiotopoulos (politician) =

Greek politician and lawyer (1930–2021)

Minister of Trade
- In office 1970–1980

Minister of Transport
- In office May 1980 – October 1981

Personal details
- Born: 1 January 1930; Kavala, Greece
- Died: 13 December 2021 (aged 91)
- Political party: New Democracy
- Parent: Nikolaos Panagiotopoulos (father)

Georgios Panagiotopoulos (Greek: Γεώργιος Παναγιωτόπουλος; 1 January 1930 – 13 December 2021) was a Greek lawyer and politician.

== Biography ==
The son of politician Nikolaos Panagiotopoulos, a former MP of the People's Party, Georgios Panagiotopoulos was born in Kavala. After he completed his law studies at the University of Athens, he returned to his hometown and started a career as a lawyer. Immediately after the dictatorship, he became involved in politics. In the first elections in 1974, he was elected MP from Kavala under the banner of the New Democracy party and was appointed undersecretary of Commerce (1974–1977). Reelected MP in 1977, he was appointed Trade Minister (1977–1980) and later Transport Minister (May 1980 – October 1981). Always under the New Democracy banner, he was reelected MP from Kavala in 1981, 1985, 1989, 1993, 1996 and 2000 - his only failure was in the 1990 elections. His seat was taken over by his nephew Nikos Panagiotopoulos in 2007.

Panagiotopoulos died on 13 December 2021, at the age of 91.
