= Polystylus (place) =

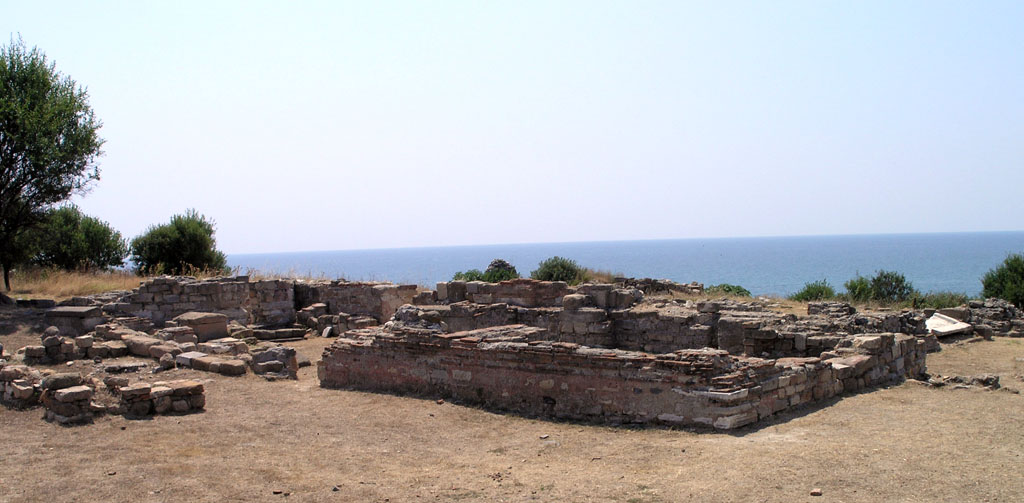
Church on the acropolis of Abdera/Polystylon, Greece

Polystylus is the name of an ancient town and bishopric in the late Roman province of Macedonia Secunda, whose metropolis was Philippi. Its name is given in this form in the Catholic Church's list of titular sees. A 1911 article by Sophrone Pétridès called it Polystylum.

== Identity ==
John VI Kantakouzenos, who restored and fortified the city, stated that it was the ancient Abdera, a statement that also occurs in a Byzantine list of names of cities published by Parthey. Pétridès rejected this identification, saying that Polystylus/Polystylum was what in his time (1911) was called Bouloustra, a village situated 5 or 7 kilometres from the ruins of ancient Abdera, and which is now called Avdira.

== History of the see ==
When Philippi was made a metropolitan see, Polystylum was one of its suffragans. It figures as such in: the Notitiæ episcopatuum of Leo VI the Wise about 901-7; the Nova Tactica of c. 940; "Notices" 3 and 10 of Parthey, which belong to the 13th century. In 1212 Pope Innocent III mentions it among the suffragans of the Latin Archdiocese of Philippi.

In 1363 the Greek bishop Peter became Metropolitan of Christopolis and the see was united to the Archdiocese of Maroneia, the metropolitan see of Rhodope.
