= Diamantis Panagiotopoulos =

Greek archeologist

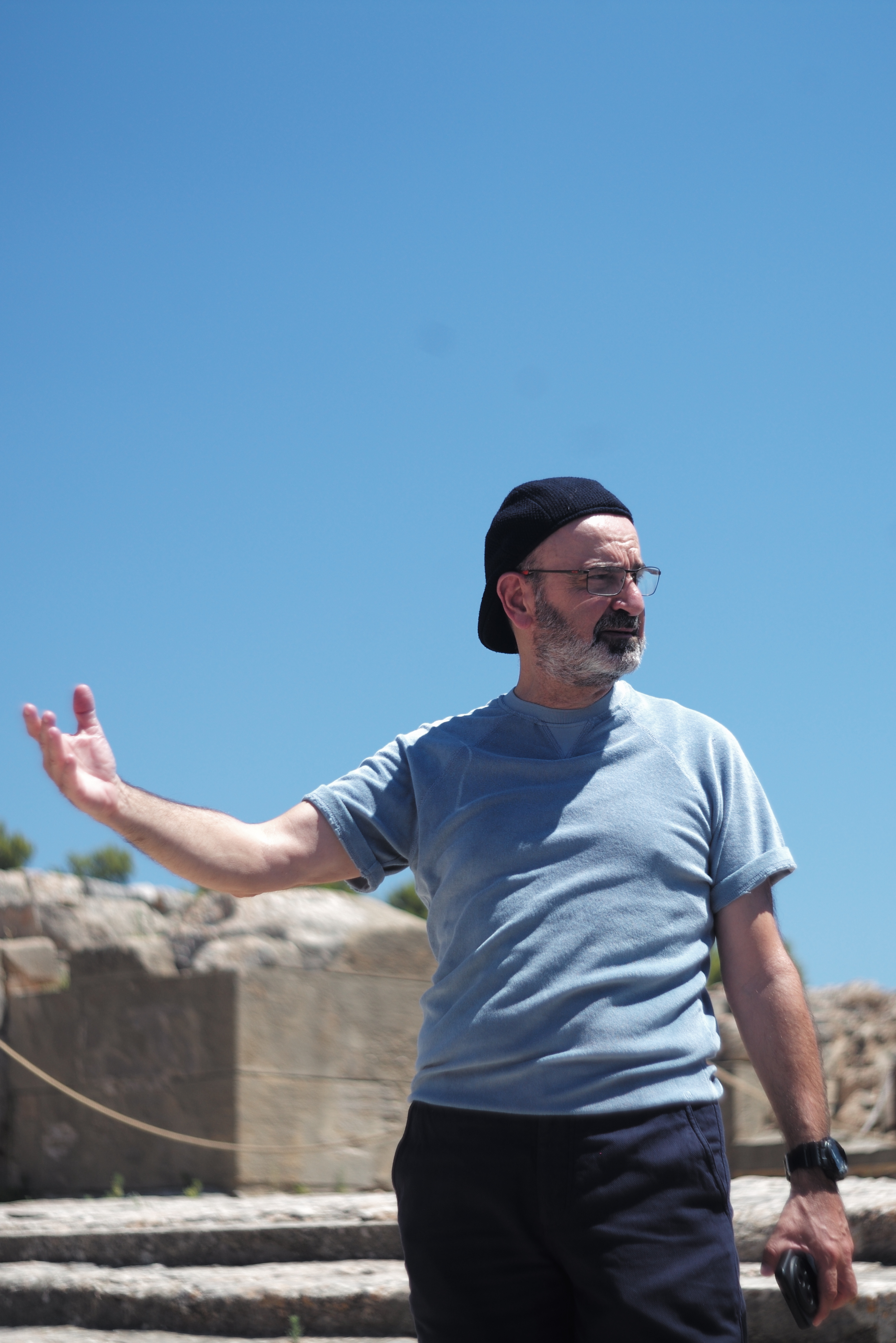
Panagiotopoulos guiding his students in Phaistos.

Diamantis Panagiotopoulos (born 6 July 1967, Athens, Greece) is an Aegean Bronze Age archaeologist and Director of the Institute of Classical Archaeology at the University of Heidelberg.

== Education ==
Diamantis Panagiotopoulos studied Classical Archaeology, History, Prehistory and Art History at the University of Athens, where he finished his diploma in 1989. 1990 he became PhD at the University of Heidelberg. There he added Egyptology and Ancient Near Eastern Studies to his expertise.

1996 he received his doctor's degree at the Ruprecht-Karls University of Heidelberg, with the title: "Das Tholosgrab E in der Nekropole von Phourni (Archanes). Studien zu einem nördlichen Außenposten der Mesara-Bestattungskultur". Seven years later Panagiotopoulos promoted to professor for Classical Archaeology with "Untersuchungen zur mykenischen Siegelpraxis" at the Philosophical Institute at the Paris Lodron University of Salzburg.

1997 he participated as scientific contributor for the Heraklion Archaeological Museum, devising the exhibition: Crete and Egypt. 1999-2000 Panagiotopoulos was associate member of the Centre for the Study of Greek and Roman Antiquity at the Corpus Christi College in Oxford.

In Summer 2000 he started giving lectures in Heidelberg, later also Salzburg (2003) and Catania (2011).

Since 2003 Panagiotopoulos is a steady member of the Archaeology of Heidelberg as a full professor of Classical Archaeology. 2008 he became the Director of the Institute for Classical Archaeology in Heidelberg and is since 2011 a leading member of the Cluster of Excellence "Asia and Europe in a Global Context" (RA A; RA D). Since December 2011 in cooperation with Dr. Maria Anastasiadou, he is supervising the CMS (Corpus of the Minoan and Mycenean seals).

== Honours ==
- 2002: Research Scholarship from the Institute of Aegean Prehistory in New York City
- 2009: Member of the German Archaeological Institute
- 1998-2001: Postdoctoral Fellowship of the German Research Foundation
- 1991-1996: DAAD PhD Fellowship

== Research interests ==
Panagiotopoulos research interests include the social structures of Minoan and Mycenaean civilisations (partic.: social hierarchy, political organisation, economy and religion), landscape archaeology, sealing practices, visual language and the interconnections between the Aegean and the Near East in the second millennium BC.

== Selected publications ==
- Minoan Realities. Approaches to images, architecture and society in the Aegean Bronze Age, 2012 (with Ute Günkel-Maschek).
- Inseln der Winde. Die maritimen Kulturen der bronzezeitlichen Ägäis, Heidelberg: Institute of Classical Archaeology (with Th. Guttandin, H. Pflug, G. Plath).
- Mykenische Siegelpraxis. Funktion, Kontext und administrative Verwendung mykenischer Tonplomben aus dem griechischen Festland und Kreta. Athens: German Archaeological Institute.
- Encountering the Alien. (De-)Constructing Alterity in the Archaeologies of the Bronze Age Eastern Mediterranean in: Maran - Stockhammer (eds.), Materiality and Social Practice. Transformative Capacities of Intercultural Encounters.
- The Stirring Sea. Conceptualising Transculturality in Late Bronze Age Eastern Mediterranean, in: Duistermaat - Regulski (eds.), Intercultural Contacts in the Ancient Mediterranean.
- In the Grip of their Past? Tracing Mycenaean Memoria, in Bennet - Sherratt (eds.), Homer and Archaeology.
