= Lagkada =

Lagkada (Greek: Λαγκάδα) may refer to several places in Greece:

- Lagkada, Chios, a village in the island of Chios
- Lagkada, Ioannina, a village in the Ioannina regional unit
- Lagkada, Itanos, a village in Lasithi, municipality Itanos
- Lagkada, Makrys Gialos, a village in Lasithi, municipality Makrys Gialos
- Lagkada, Messenia, a village in Messenia
- Lagkadas, a municipality in the Thessaloniki regional unit
- Loutra Lagkadas, a village and a thermal spring in the Thessaloniki regional unit
- Lake Lagkada, a lake in Greece

== See also ==
- Lagkadia (disambiguation)
