= Ardani =

Ardani may refer to several places in Greece:

- Ardani, Evros, a village in the municipal unit of Feres, Evros regional unit
- Ardani, Trikala, a village in the municipal unit of Paliokastro, Trikala regional unit

Ardanion may refer to:

- Ardanion (ἀρδάνιον), was a container of water was set at the entrance of an ancient Greek house where a deceased person lay, so that anyone exiting could cleanse themselves by sprinkling the water.
