= Ardani, Trikala =

Ardani Αρδάνι
- Community
- Location within Greece
- Coordinates: 39°38′N 21°47′E
- Country: Greece
- Administrative region: Thessaly
- Regional unit: Trikala
- Municipality: Trikala
- Municipal unit: Paliokastro

Population (2021)
  - Community: 324
- Time zone: UTC+2 (EET)
  - Summer (DST): UTC+3 (EEST)
- Vehicle registration: ΤΚ

Ardani (Greek: Αρδάνι) is a village in the municipal unit of Paliokastro in the Trikala regional unit, Greece. Ardani had a population of 324 in 2021. Ardani is located 8 km north of Trikala, on the edge of the Thessalian Plain. The nearest village is Platanos.

== Population ==
Year	Population
1981	538
1991	610
2001	465
2011	374
2021	324

== See also ==
- List of settlements in the Trikala regional unit
