= Langadia =

Langadia (Greek: Λαγκάδια) or seldom Lagkadia may refer to the following places in Greece:

- Langadia, Arcadia, a municipal unit in northwestern Arcadia
- Langadia, Arta, a village in the Arta regional unit, part of the municipal unit Athamania
- Langadia, Pella, a village in the Pella regional unit, part of the municipal unit Exaplatanos
- Langadia, Trikala, a village in the Trikala regional unit, part of the municipal unit Paliokastro
