= Vasilis Gregoriou =

Researcher, inventor, technology entrepreneur

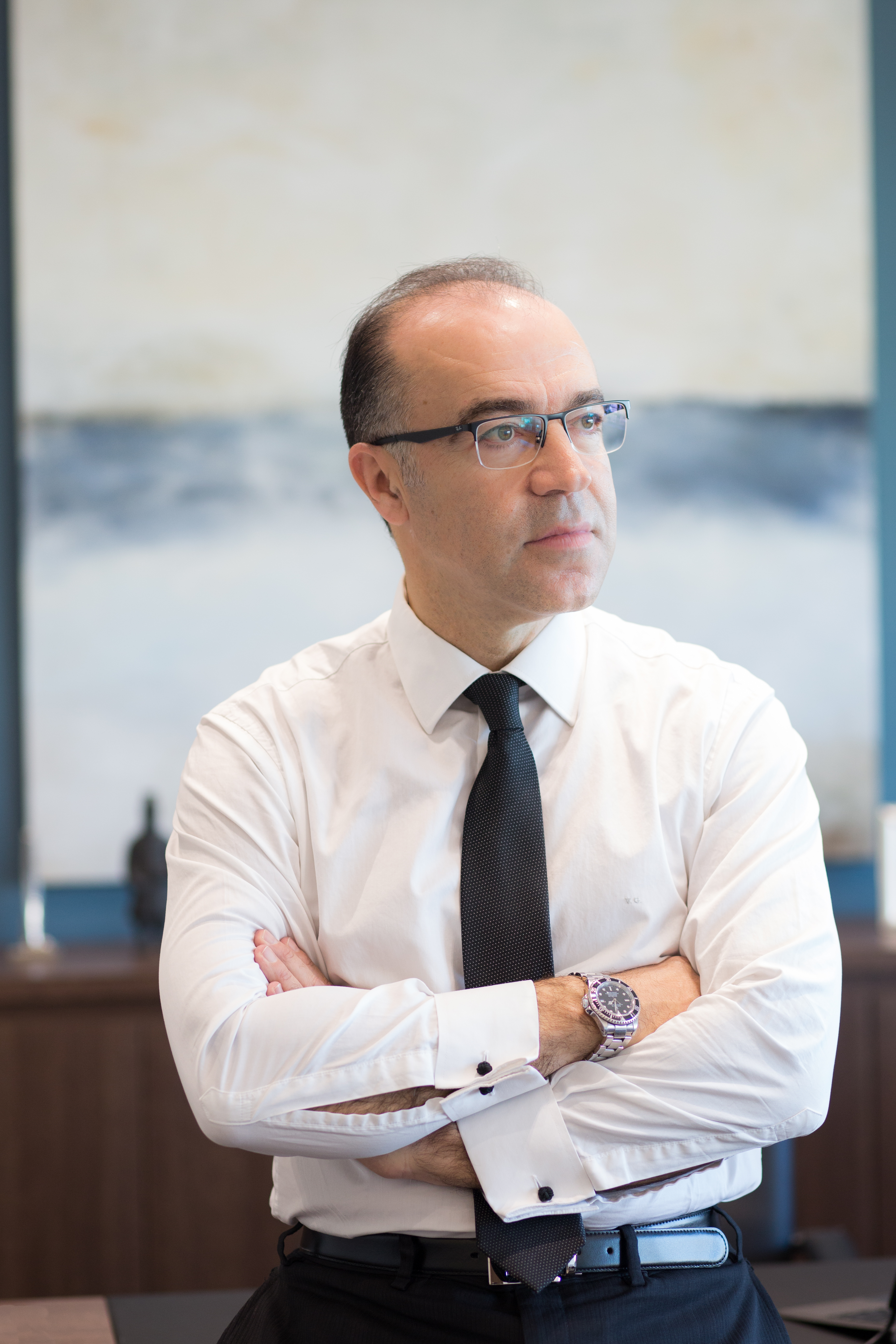
- Born: 1965; Trikala
- Education: University of Patras, Duke University, Princeton University, Northeastern University, East Carolina University
- Occupations: Researcher, inventor, entrepreneur

Vasilis Gregoriou (born 1965, Trikala, Greece) is a researcher, inventor, technology entrepreneur and former Director and Chairman of the Board of Directors at National Hellenic Research Foundation (NHRF) in Athens, Greece. During his career, he has achieved international recognition by serving in research and administrative positions both in Greece and the US. His studies in Greece began at the University of Patras (BSc. Chemistry) while his studies in the United States took place at Duke University where he received a PhD degree in Physical Chemistry. He was also a National Research Service Award recipient at Princeton University.

== Career ==
His academic teaching experience spans in both undergraduate level at the University of Massachusetts and postgraduate level at the University of Connecticut and the University of Patras. His published work as co-author includes three books, six chapters in other authors' books, 92 scientific papers and 146 research presentations. Vasilis Gregoriou is also co-inventor of 15 patents. His research interests include flexible photovoltaic cells based on organic semiconductors, optically active materials based on conjugated oligomers, and nanostructured polymer materials. He has served as President of Society for Applied Spectroscopy (SAS) in 2001 and now he participates as National Representative of Greece in the Committee of the European Research Council (ERC) for the Horizon 2020 program, the Mari Sklodowska-Curie actions and the Future and Emerging Technologies (FET). Vasilis Gregoriou has been the Director of the National Hellenic Research Foundation since 2013. As a technology entrepreneur, Vasilis Gregoriou is the co-founder and the CEO of Advent Technologies which is based in Cambridge, Massachusetts. Advent Technologies develops advanced technology and devices in the field of energy and defense and it has also developed research collaborations with Northeastern University in Boston, US, Patras University in Greece, and the Institute of Chemical Engineering Sciences (ICE-HT/FORTH).

== Awards and achievements ==
- National Representative for Greece in Horizon 2020 Committee in the European Union for the European Research Council (ERC),

the Mari Sklodowska-Curie actions, and the Future and Emerging Technologies (FET) Brussels, Belgium (2014–present)

- National Deputy Representative for Greece and Specialist for Nanotechnology in the European Union, Brussels (2007-2010)
- President, Society for Applied Spectroscopy (SAS), 2001.
- Board of Governors, Eastern Analytical Symposium (EAS), 1998 - .
- President, New England Section, Society for Applied Spectroscopy (1997 –1998).
- National Research Service Award recipient, NIH postdoctoral fellowship, Princeton University, 1994.
- Tomas Hirschfeld Award, Federation of Analytical Chemistry and Spectroscopy Societies (FACSS), 1992.
- Coblentz Society Student Award, 1992.

== Books ==
- “Vibrational Spectroscopy of Biomolecules and Polymers” V.G. Gregoriou and M. Braiman, Editors, Taylor & Francis Co, New York, NY, (2006). ISBN 1574445391
- “Polymer Spectroscopy” V.G. Gregoriou Editor, Wiley-VCH, Weinheim, Germany (2004). ISBN 352731038X
- “Modern Infrared Spectroscopy: Principles and Applications” A.A. Christy, Y. Ozaki, and V.G. Gregoriou, Elsevier Science, Amsterdam, the Netherlands (2001).
