= Osman Shah Mosque =

Former mosque in Trikala, Greece

- Τέμενος Οσμάν Σαχ
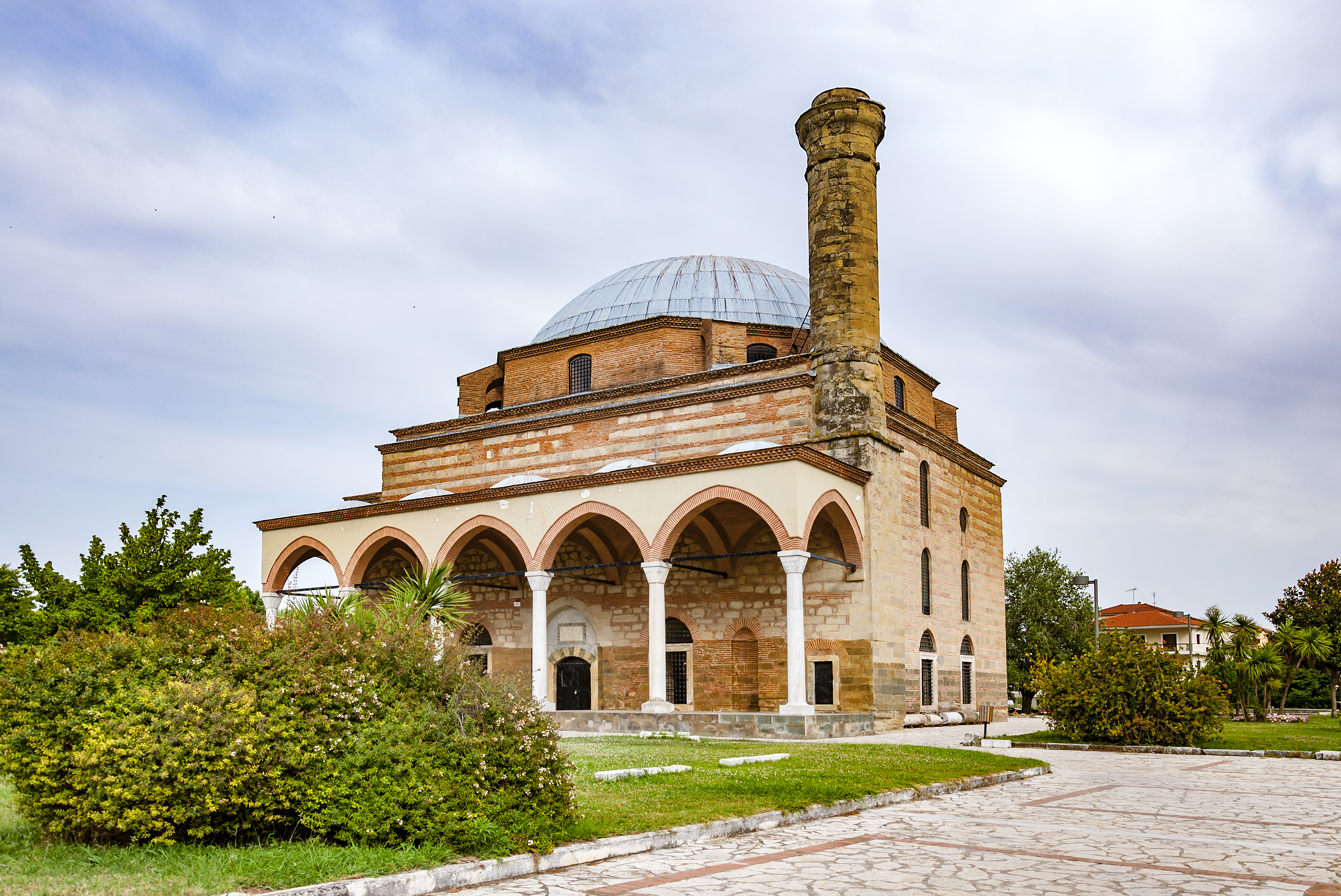
- The former mosque in 2016

- Location of the former mosque in Greece

Religion
- Affiliation: Islam (former)
- Ecclesiastical or organisational status: Mosque (c. 1570–c. 1890s)
- Status: Abandoned (as a mosque); Repurposed (for cultural use)

Location
- Location: Trikala, Thessaly
- Country: Greece
- Interactive map of Osman Shah Mosque
- Coordinates: 39°33′00″N 21°46′16″E

Architecture
- Architect: Mimar Sinan
- Type: Mosque
- Style: Ottoman
- Groundbreaking: c. 1566
- Completed: 1570

Specifications
- Dome: 1
- Dome dia. (outer): 18 m (59 ft)
- Minaret: 1
- Materials: Brick; stone

The Osman Shah Mosque (Greek: Τέμενος Οσμάν Σαχ), also known as the Kursum Mosque (Κουρσούμ Τζαμί, from Turkish: kurşun camii, lit. 'Leaden Mosque') is a former mosque in the city of Trikala, in the Thessaly region of Greece. The mosque was completed in 1570 during the Ottoman era, was abandoned in c. 1890s, and the building was subsequently repurposed for cultural use.

== Overview ==
The mosque was commissioned by Osman Şah Bey, also known as Kara Osman Pasha, who was the son of Hatice Sultan and Kapudan Iskender Pasha. Osman Shah for a long time dwelt in Trikala as the governor of the local province, the Sanjak of Trikala. The mosque was designed by the Ottoman imperial architect Mimar Sinan and is the only one by him that lies in modern Greece.

The exact dating of the mosque is uncertain, but it was probably built in the period 1550–60, most likely in the late 1550s. Osman attached several charitable establishments to the mosque, among others a madrasah, an alms house, and a caravanserai, and was himself buried in a türbe in the mosque's southern courtyard at the time of his death in 1567/8. By the time of Evliya Çelebi's visit a century later, the mosque was the principal mosque of the city.

It is also the only mosque still standing in the city of Trikala out of the at least eight that Evliya Çelebi reported seeing. The building itself consists of a square prayer hall topped by a large 18-metre (59 ft) diameter semi-spherical dome. The front portico (revak) was completely rebuilt in the 1998 renovations. The ashlar minaret is located on the northwestern corner and is well preserved, except for its missing roof. All other buildings attached to the mosque have since vanished, except for the founder's octagonal türbe (tomb), which is used as a storage site for artefacts recovered from archaeological excavations.

The building is currently used as an events space. Due to its historic significance and architectural value as a building designed by Sinan, the Turkish Directorate General of Foundations has offered to restore the mosque.

== See also ==
- List of Friday mosques designed by Mimar Sinan
- List of former mosques in Greece
- Islam in Greece
- Ottoman Greece
