= Trikala Castle =

- Κάστρο Τρικάλων
- Trikala, Thessaly, Greece
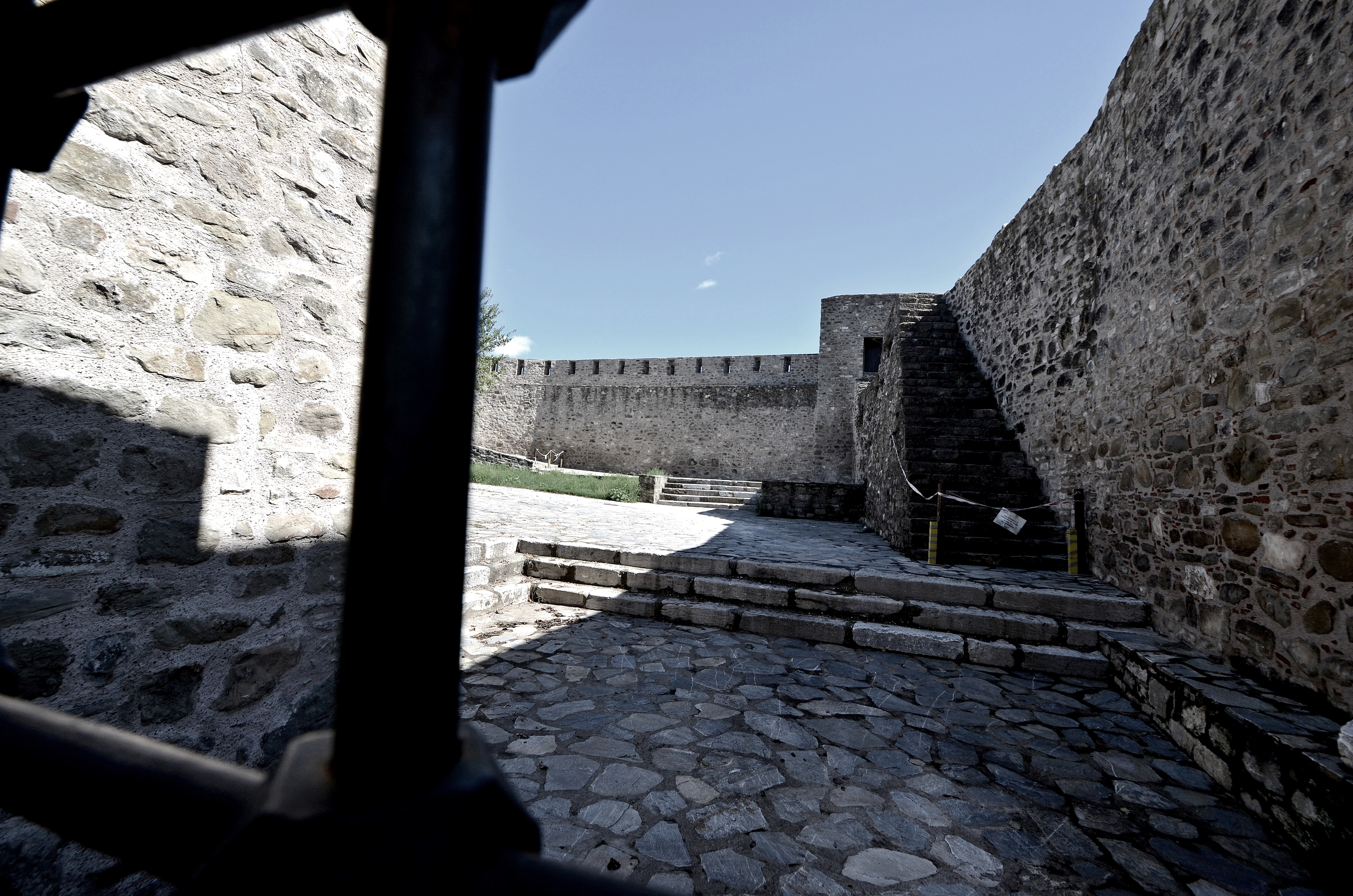
- Inside the castle

Site information
- Type: medieval citadel
- Owner: Greece

Location
- Coordinates: 39°33′30″N 21°45′45″E

Site history
- Built: originally 6th century; present form largely 14th century with Ottoman modifications
- Built by: Byzantine Empire

The Trikala Castle (Greek: Κάστρο Τρικάλων) is the Byzantine-era citadel of the city of Trikala in western Thessaly, Greece.

== History ==
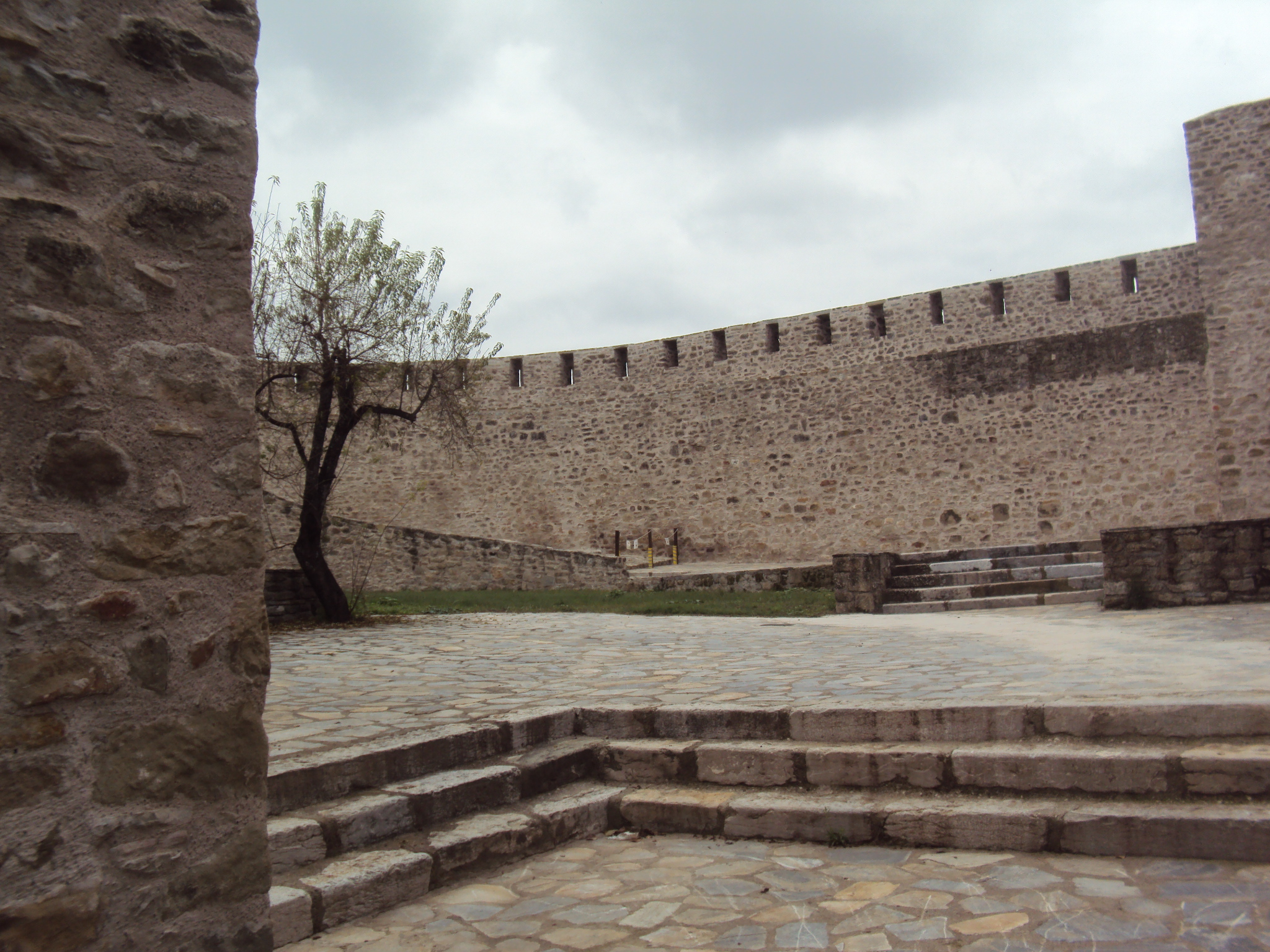
Interior

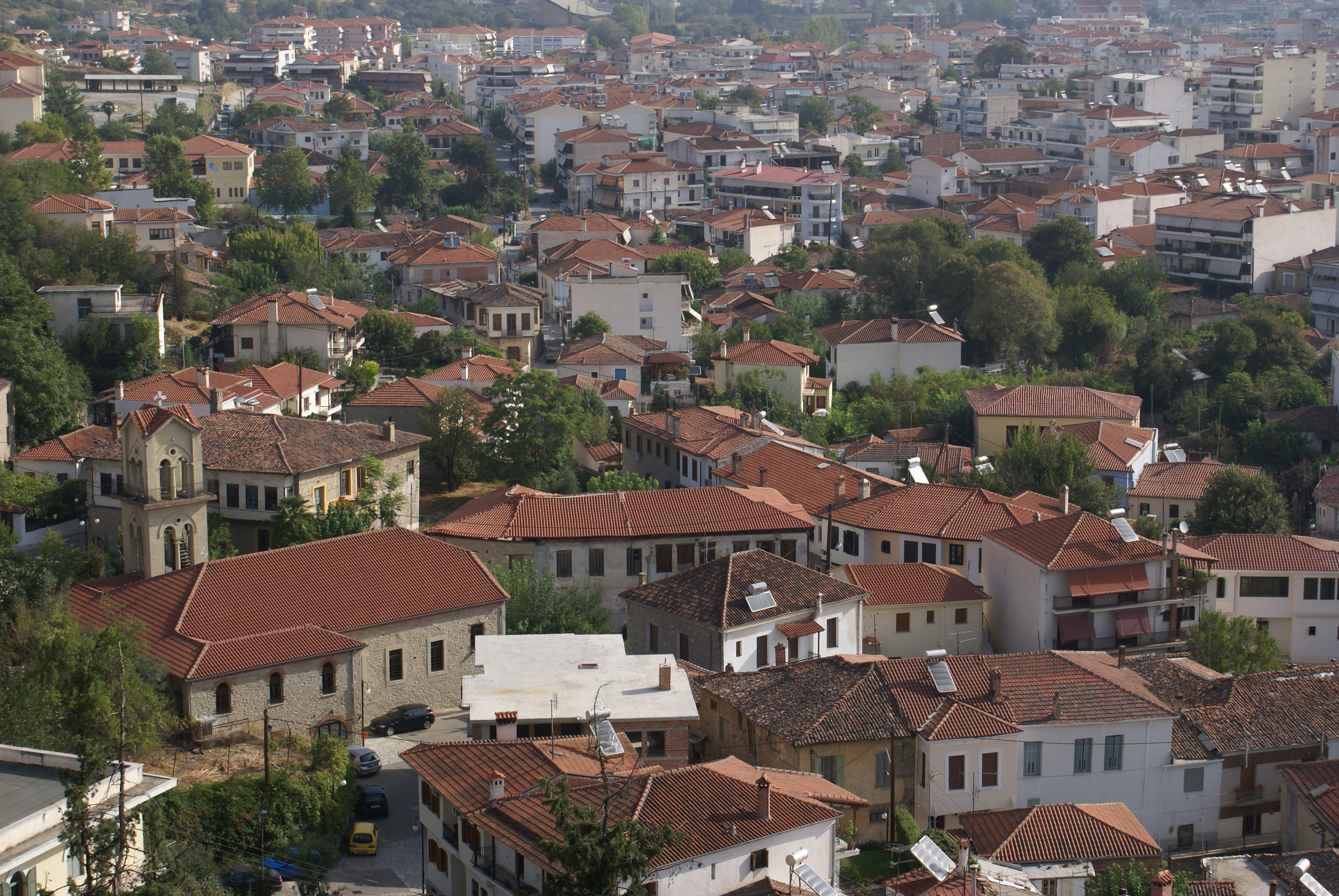
View of the old town (Varousi) from the castle

The castle lies on a hill at the northeastern side of the city, and was first built, according to Procopius of Caesarea, by Emperor Justinian I (r. 527–565) on the ruins of the acropolis of the ancient city of Trikke. In its current form it largely dates from the Palaiologan period, where it was extensively rebuilt and remodelled. The citadel suffered much damage during its conquest by the Ottoman Turks in 1393/4, but the city's importance as a bulwark against the restless inhabitants of the Pindus mountains and the Agrafa region, as well as being the centre of the Ottoman administration in Thessaly, meant that it was quickly repaired and strengthened. The castle suffered damage and was repaired after the failed rebellions of 1854 and 1878 against Ottoman rule.

== Description ==
The castle is, according to the archaeologist Krystallo Mantzana, a "typical Byzantine fortification", with an elongated shape along an axis from southwest to north, strengthened by square towers. The castle comprises three distinct enceintes on different levels of the hill: the lower fortress on the southern slope of the hill; the middle fortress, which is the largest of the three; and the inner fortress, also known by its Turkish name Its Kale (Ιτς Καλέ), which lies on the northeastern corner of the castle is protected by four particularly large and tall towers. Traces of the original Justinianian fortification have been found in the southern slopes, as well as the area of the inner citadel.

On the eastern side of the castle is the Clock Tower of Trikala, originally erected in the mid-17th century by the Ottomans. The original tower was destroyed by the Germans during World War II, and was rebuilt after the war.
