= Paliokastro, Trikala =

Former municipality in Greece

Paliokastro Παληόκαστρο
- Municipal unit
- Location within the regional unit

- Location within Greece
- Coordinates: 39°36′N 21°49′E
- Country: Greece
- Administrative region: Thessaly
- Regional unit: Trikala
- Municipality: Trikala

Area
  - Municipal unit: 197.9 km^{2} (76.4 sq mi)

Population (2021)
  - Municipal unit: 2,316
  - Municipal unit density: 11.70/km^{2} (30.31/sq mi)
- Time zone: UTC+2 (EET)
  - Summer (DST): UTC+3 (EEST)
- Vehicle registration: ΤΚ

Paliokastro (Greek: Παληόκαστρο) is a former municipality in the Trikala regional unit, Thessaly, Greece. Since the 2011 local government reform it is part of the municipality Trikala, of which it is a municipal unit. It is located in the east-northeastern part of the regional unit. Its population was 2,316 at the 2021 census, and it has a land area of 197.878 km². The seat of the municipality was in the village of Palaiopyrgos (pop. 773). Its largest other communities are Krinítsa (pop. 540), Zilevtí (387), Ardáni (324), and Agreliá (145). The name of the municipality comes from the greek words παληο, paleo + κάστρο, kastro meaning "old castle" (from the name of the village Palaiopyrgos, "old tower").
