= Trikala =

City in Thessaly, Greece

Trikala Τρίκαλα
- Municipality
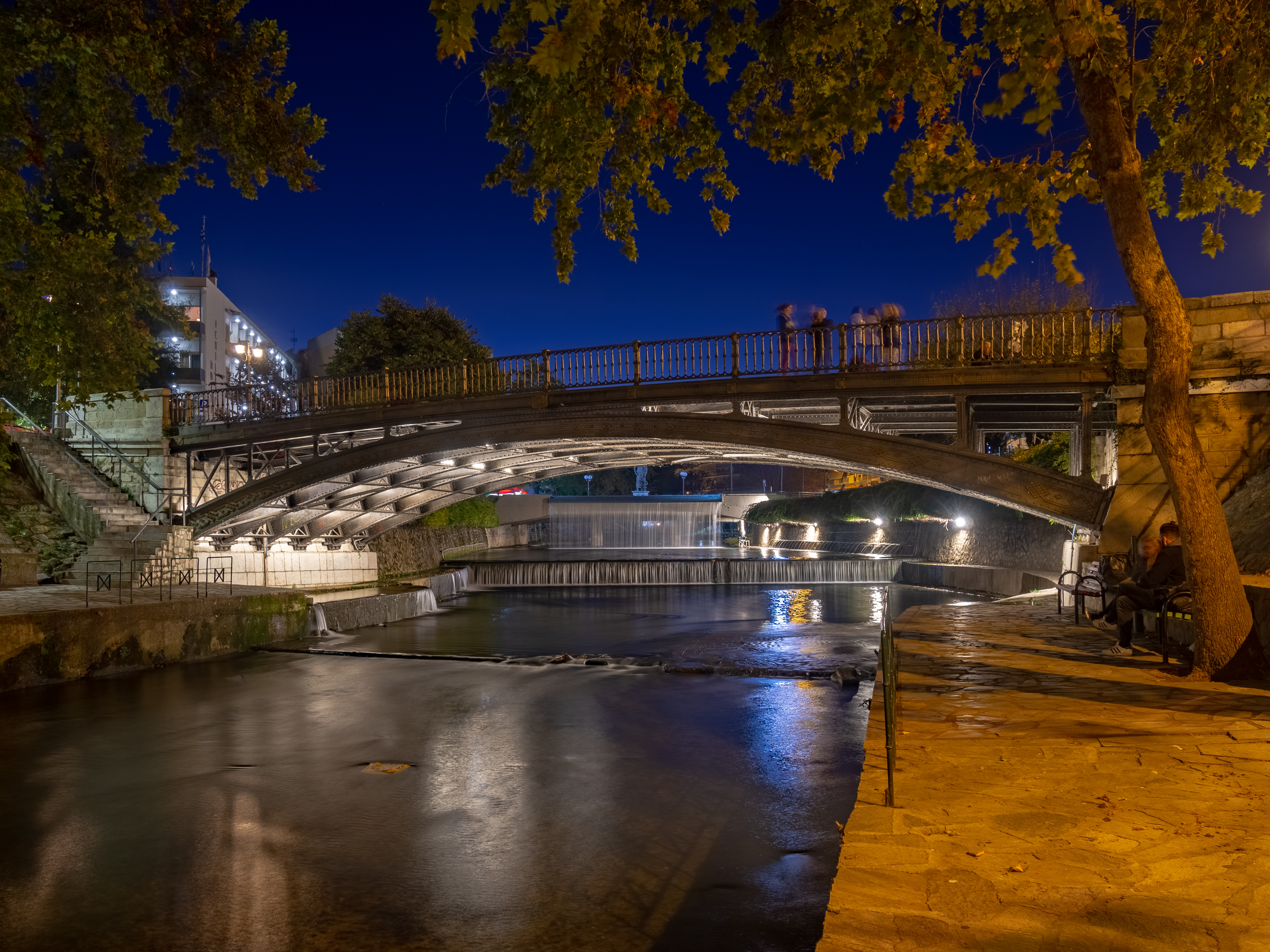
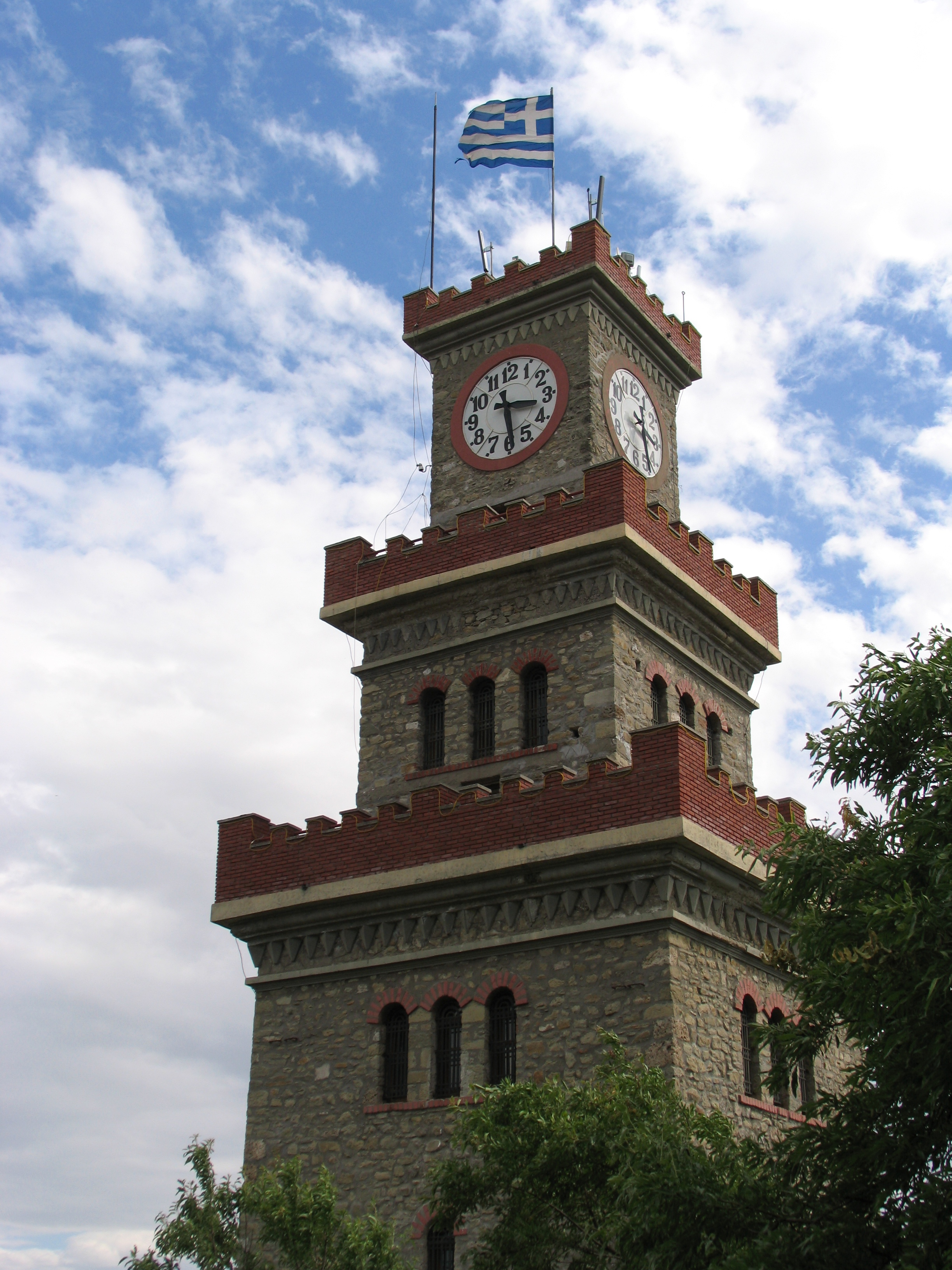
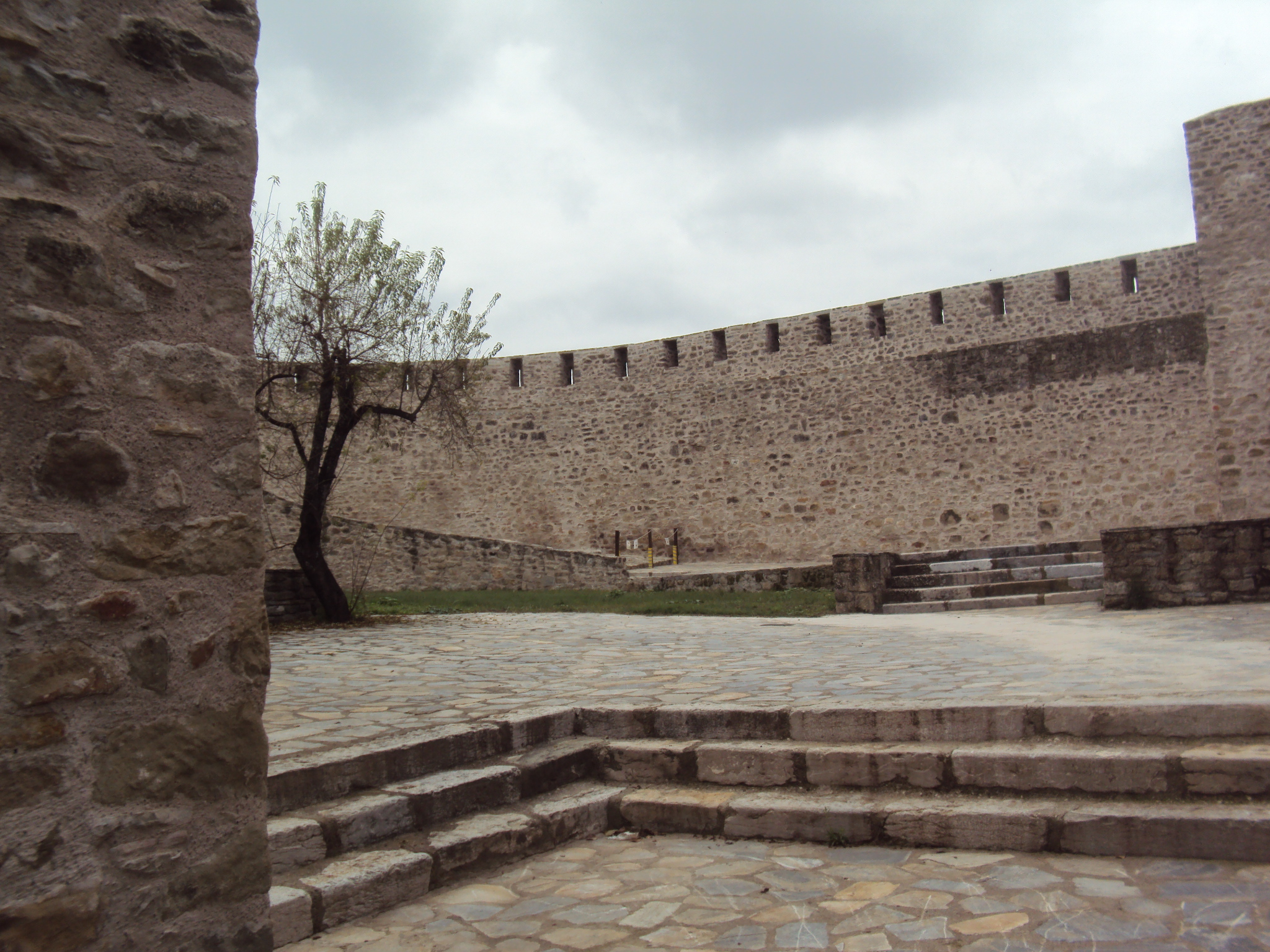
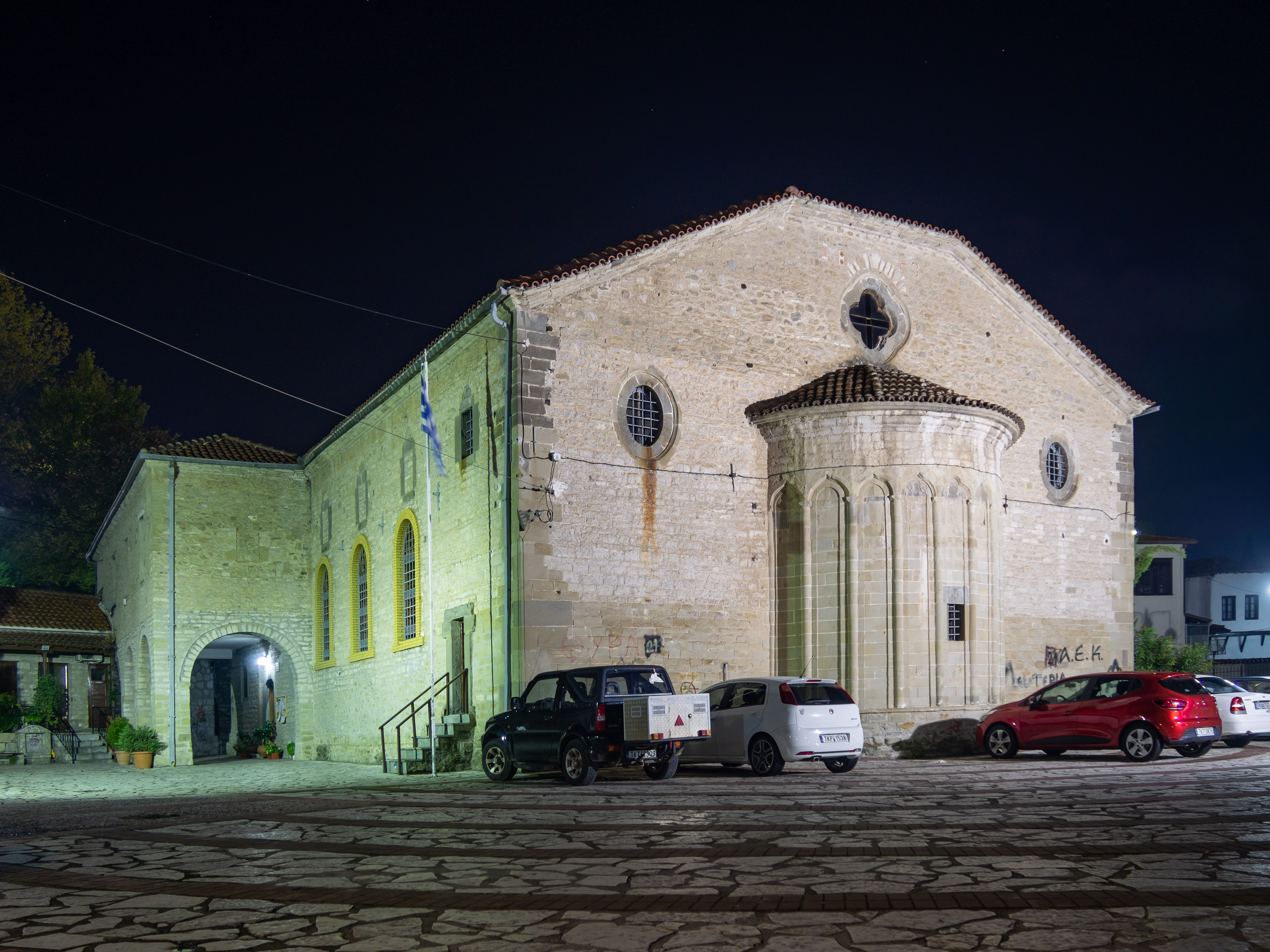
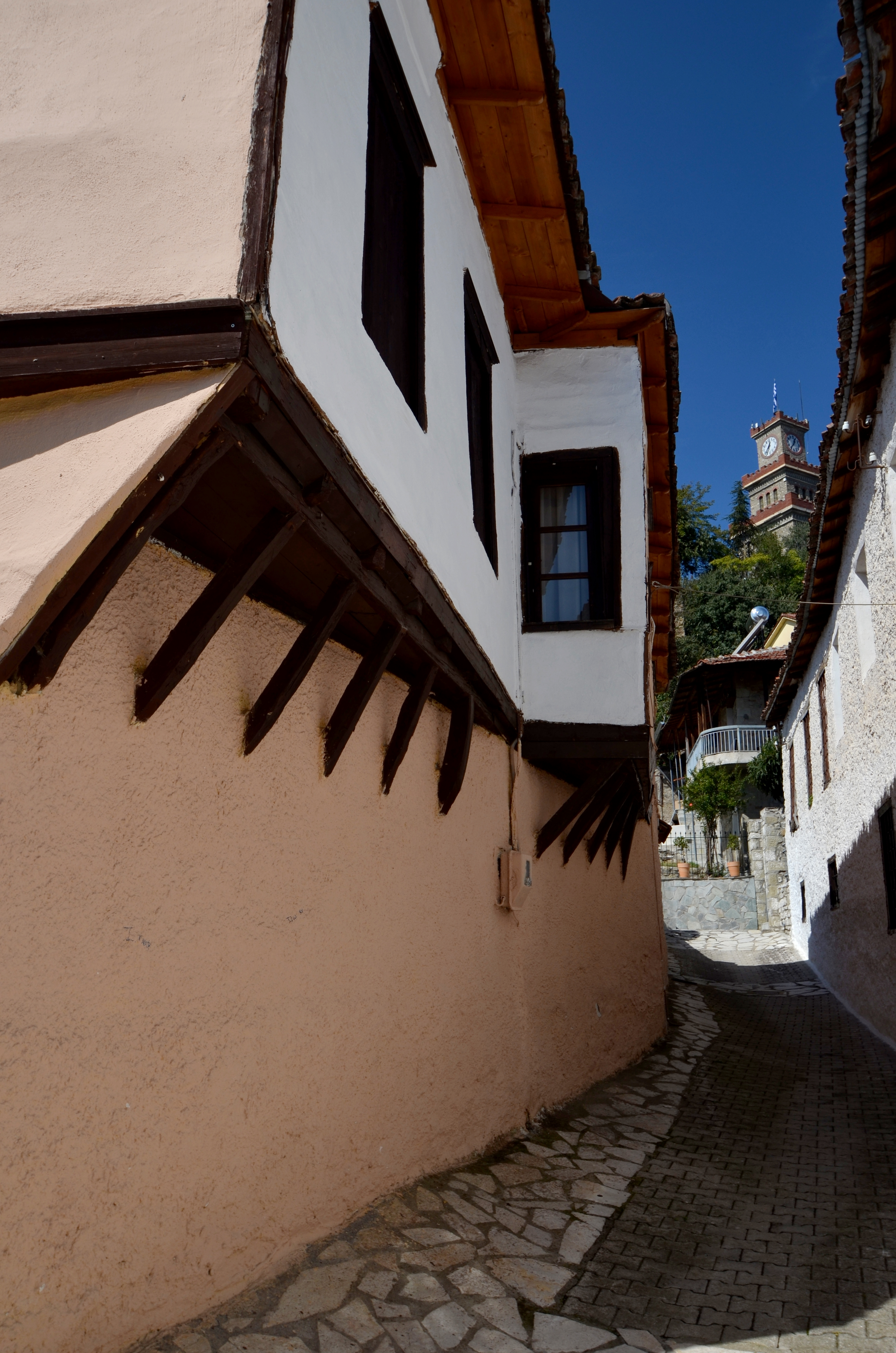
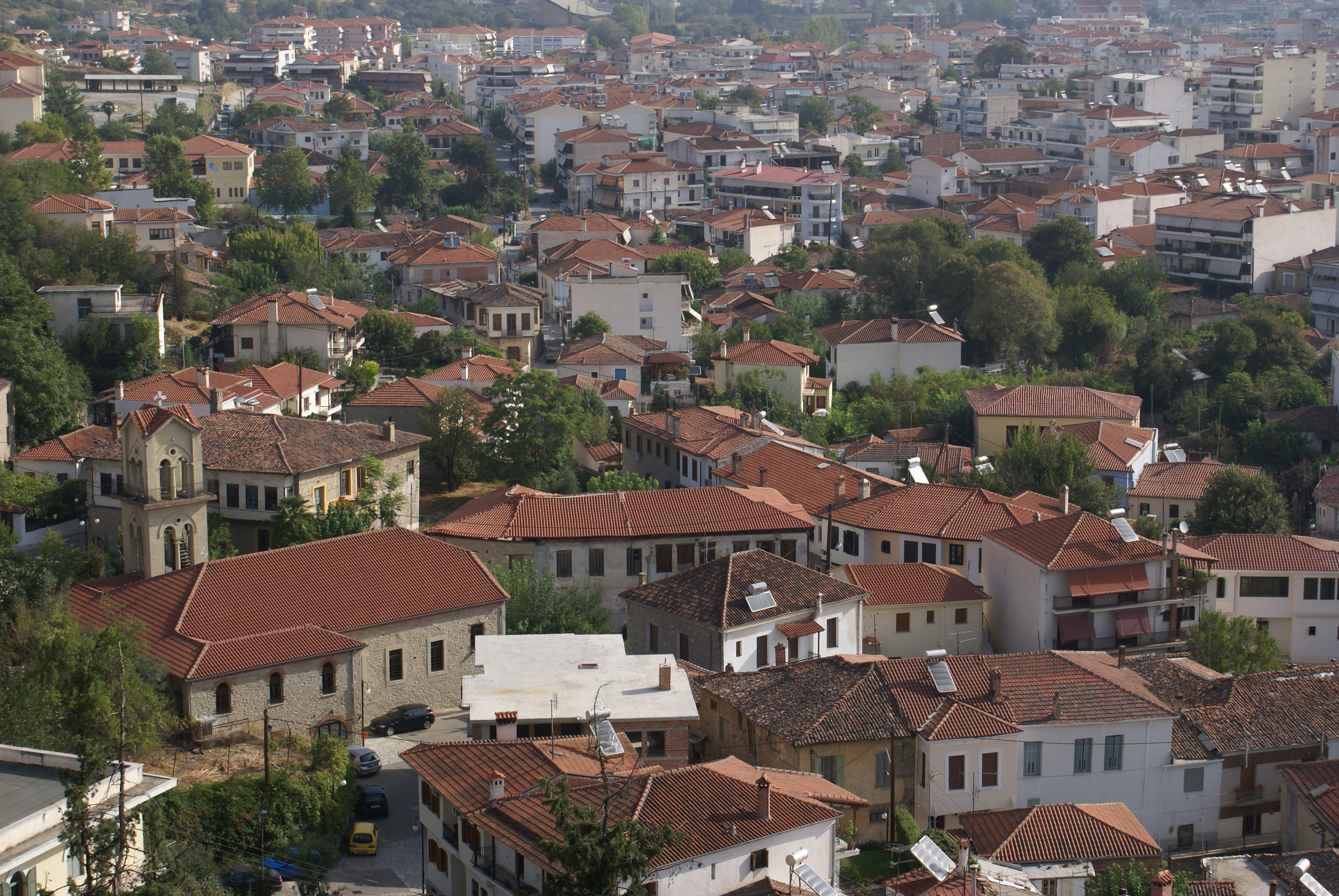
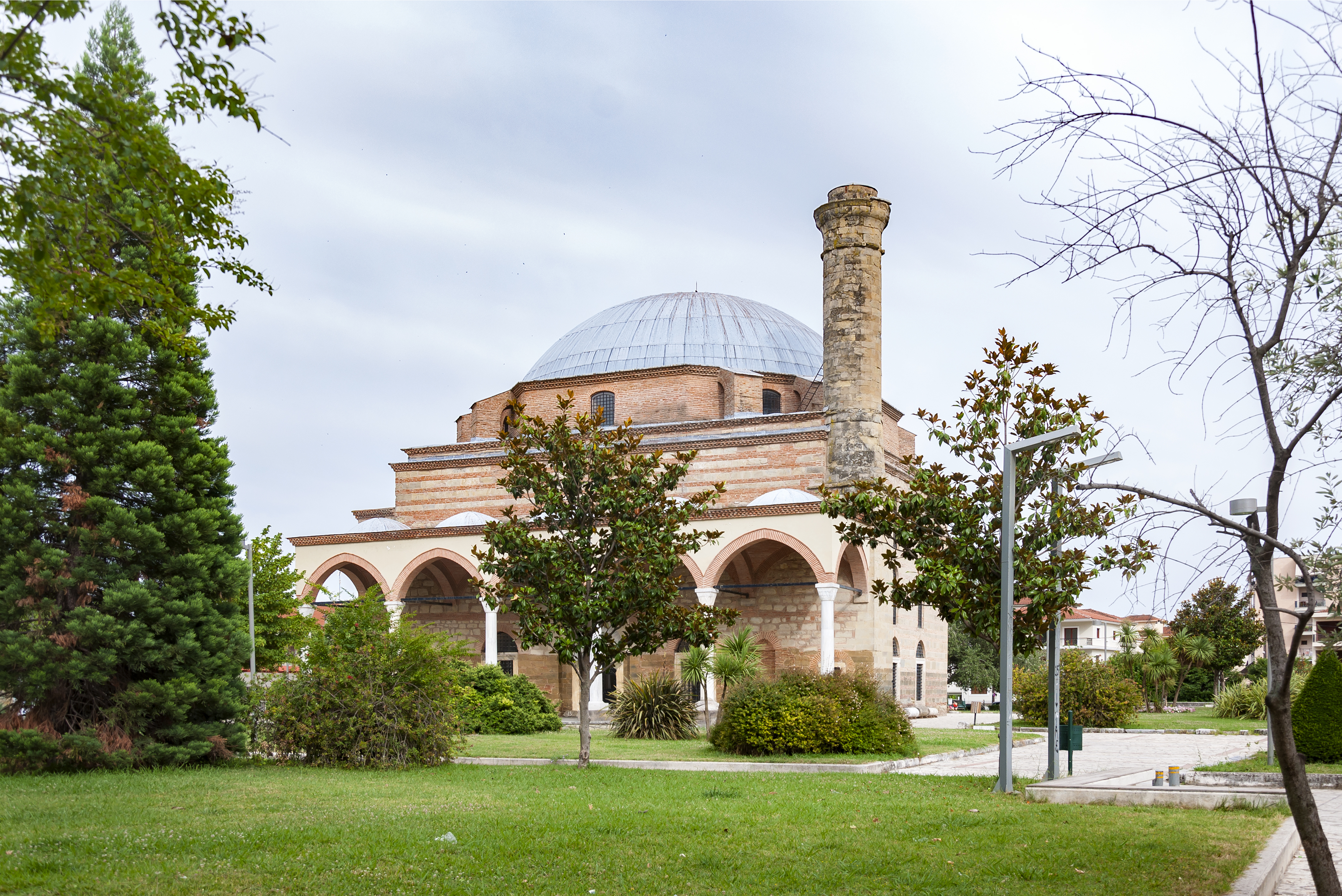
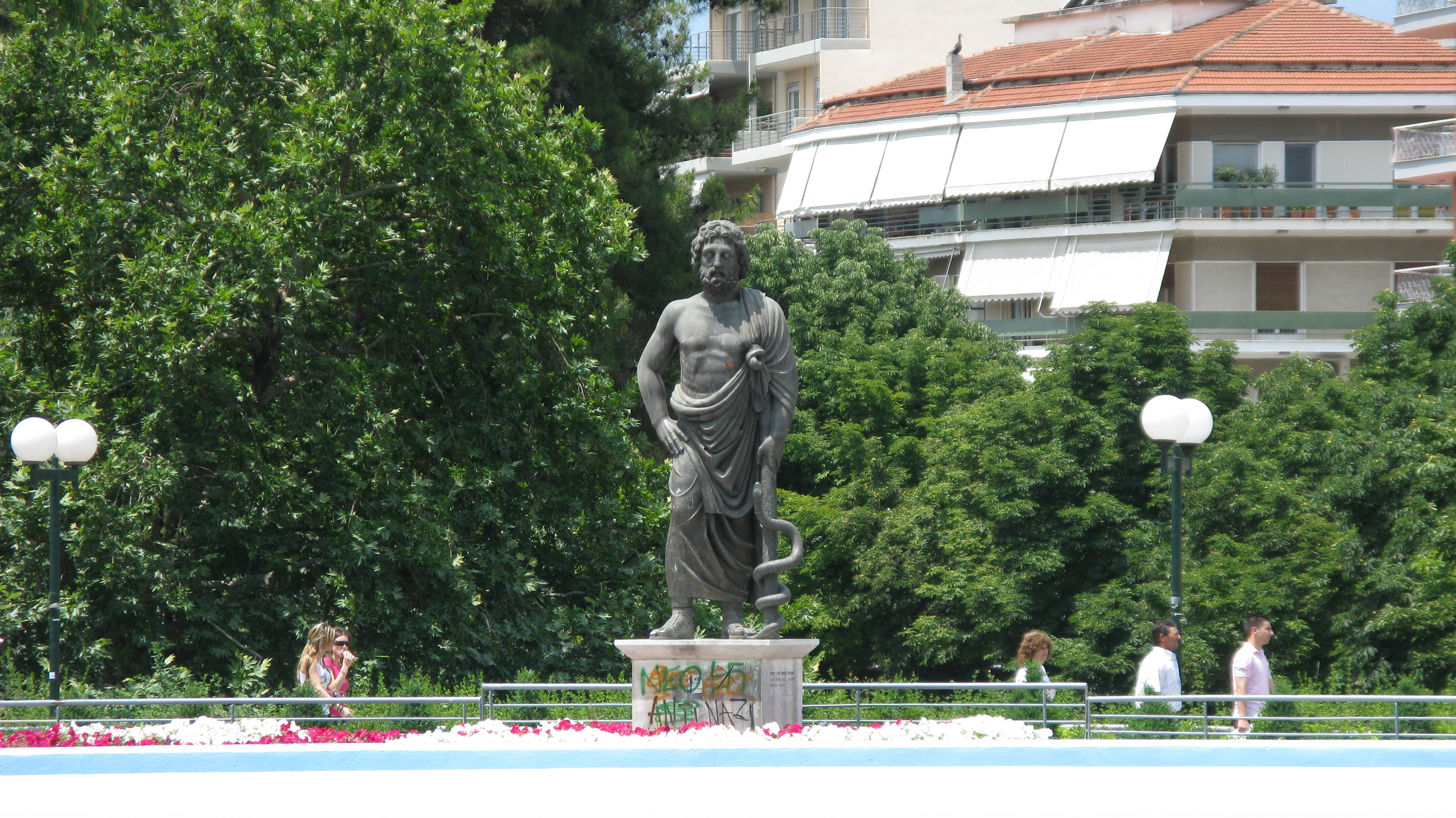
- Clockwise from top: Central Bridge, Trikala Castle, a street in Varousi (old town), Osman Shah Mosque, Asclepius Statue, view of Varousi (old town), Panagia Faneromeni Church, Trikala Clock Tower

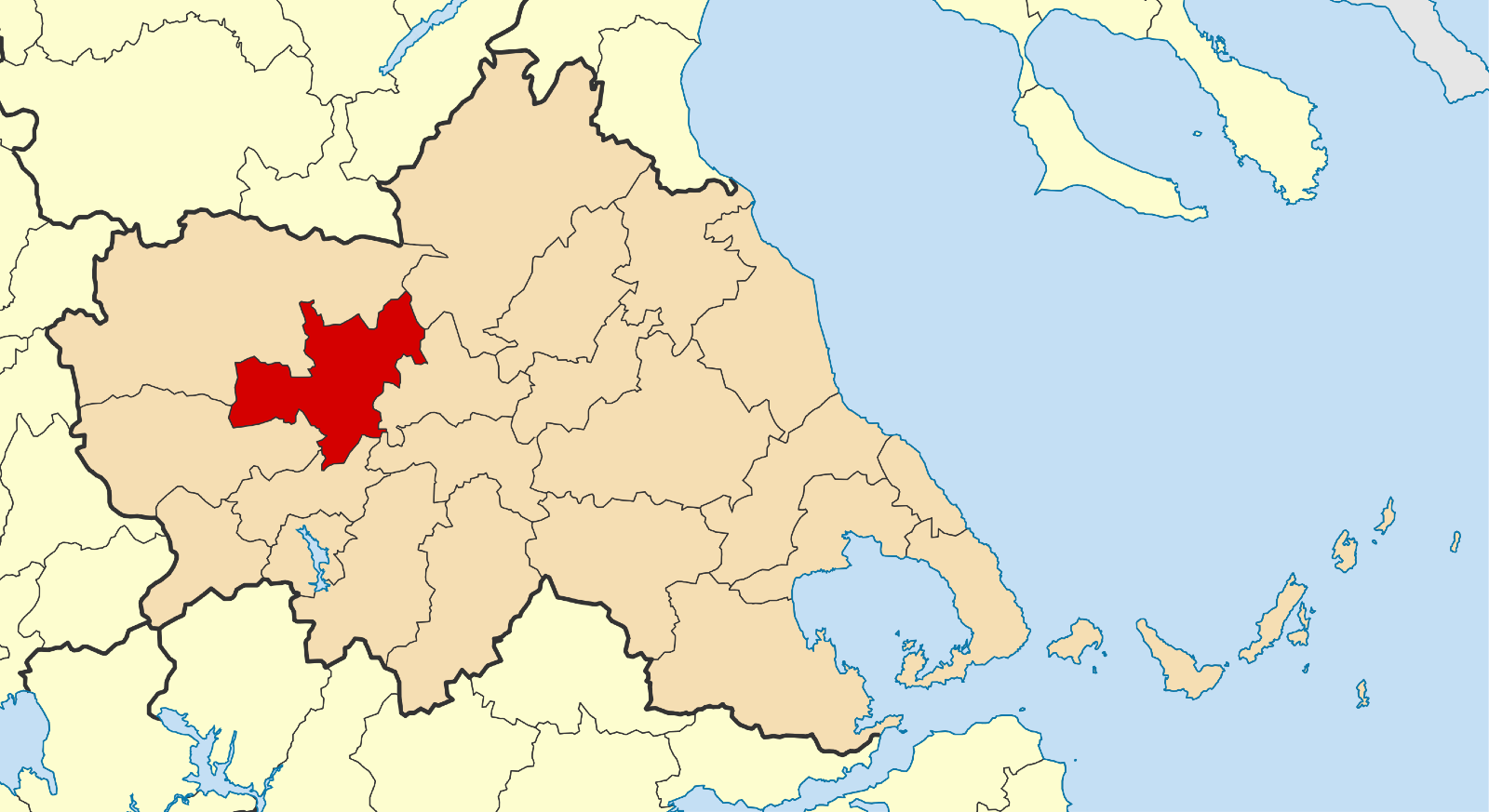

- Location within Greece
- Coordinates: 39°33′N 21°46′E
- Country: Greece
- Administrative region: Thessaly
- Regional unit: Trikala

Government
  - Mayor: Nikolaos Sakkas (since 2023)

Area
  - Municipality: 607.59 km^{2} (234.59 sq mi)
  - Municipal unit: 69.2 km^{2} (26.7 sq mi)
- Elevation: 115 m (377 ft)

Population (2021)
  - Municipality: 78,605
  - Density: 129.37/km^{2} (335.07/sq mi)
  - Municipal unit: 62,064
  - Municipal unit density: 897/km^{2} (2,320/sq mi)
- Time zone: UTC+2 (EET)
  - Summer (DST): UTC+3 (EEST)
- Postal code: 421 00
- Area code: 24310
- Vehicle registration: ΤΚ
- Website: www.trikalacity.gr

Trikala (Greek: Τρίκαλα) is a city in northwestern Thessaly, Greece, and the capital of the Trikala regional unit. The city straddles the Lithaios river, which is a tributary of Pineios. It is located within close proximity to both Meteora and the southern Pindus mountain range.

According to the Greek National Statistical Service, Trikala is populated by 62,064 inhabitants (2021), while the municipality of Trikala is populated by 78,605 inhabitants (2021).

== Name ==
The city's name derives from the ancient Trikka or Trikke (Ancient Greek: Τρίκκα or Τρίκκη), which was itself named after a nymph that was a daughter of Peneus or Asopos. The name Trikala appears in the Byzantine period. In Turkish, the city is known as Tırhala. In Aromanian it is known as Trikolj and in Albanian as Tërhalla.

== History ==
=== Antiquity ===
Silver hemidrachm struck in Trikka 440-400 BC.
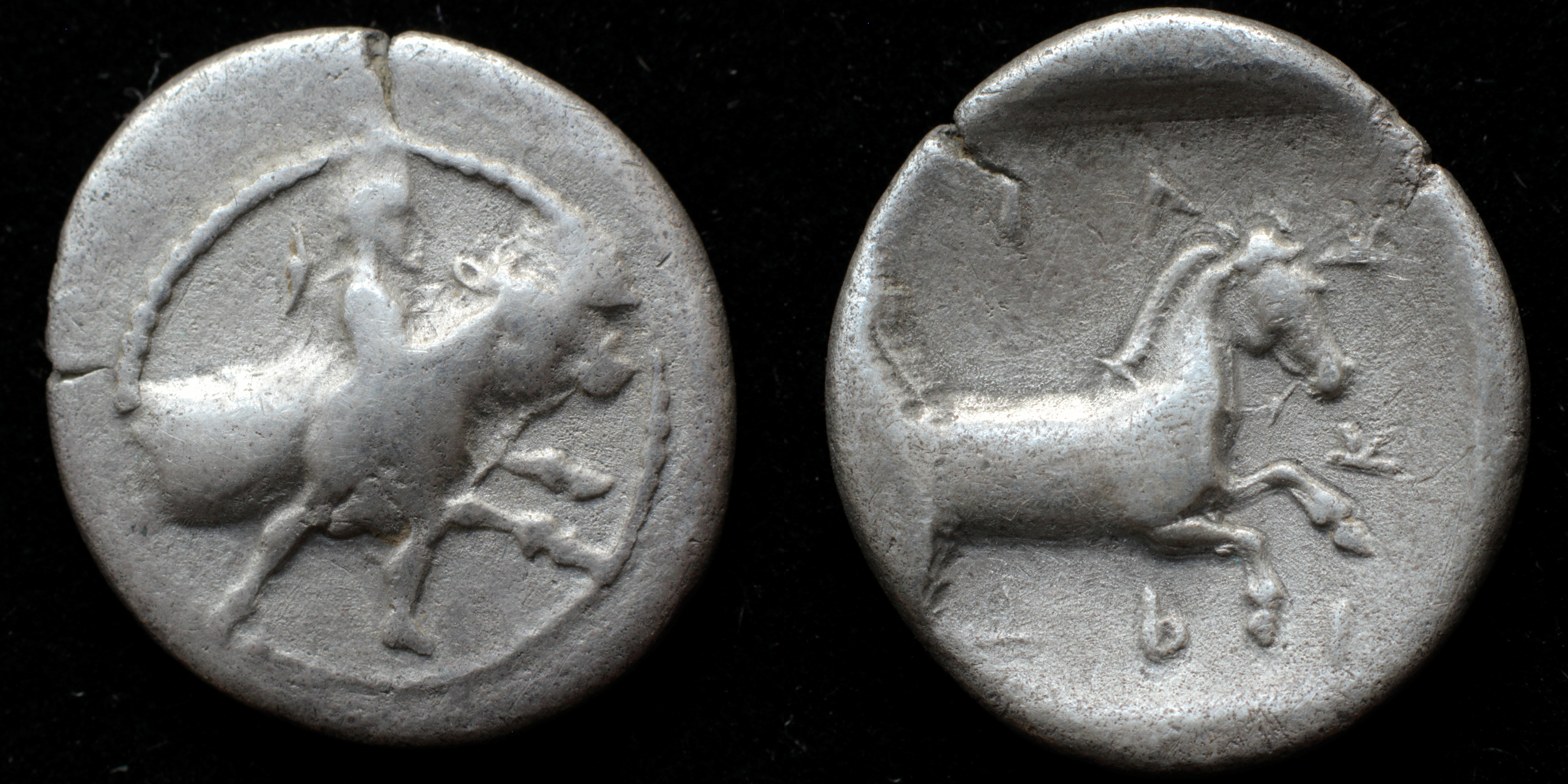
First side of the image: O: naked Thessalian youth restraining forepart of unruly prancing bull
Second side of the image: R:forepart of bridled prancing horse

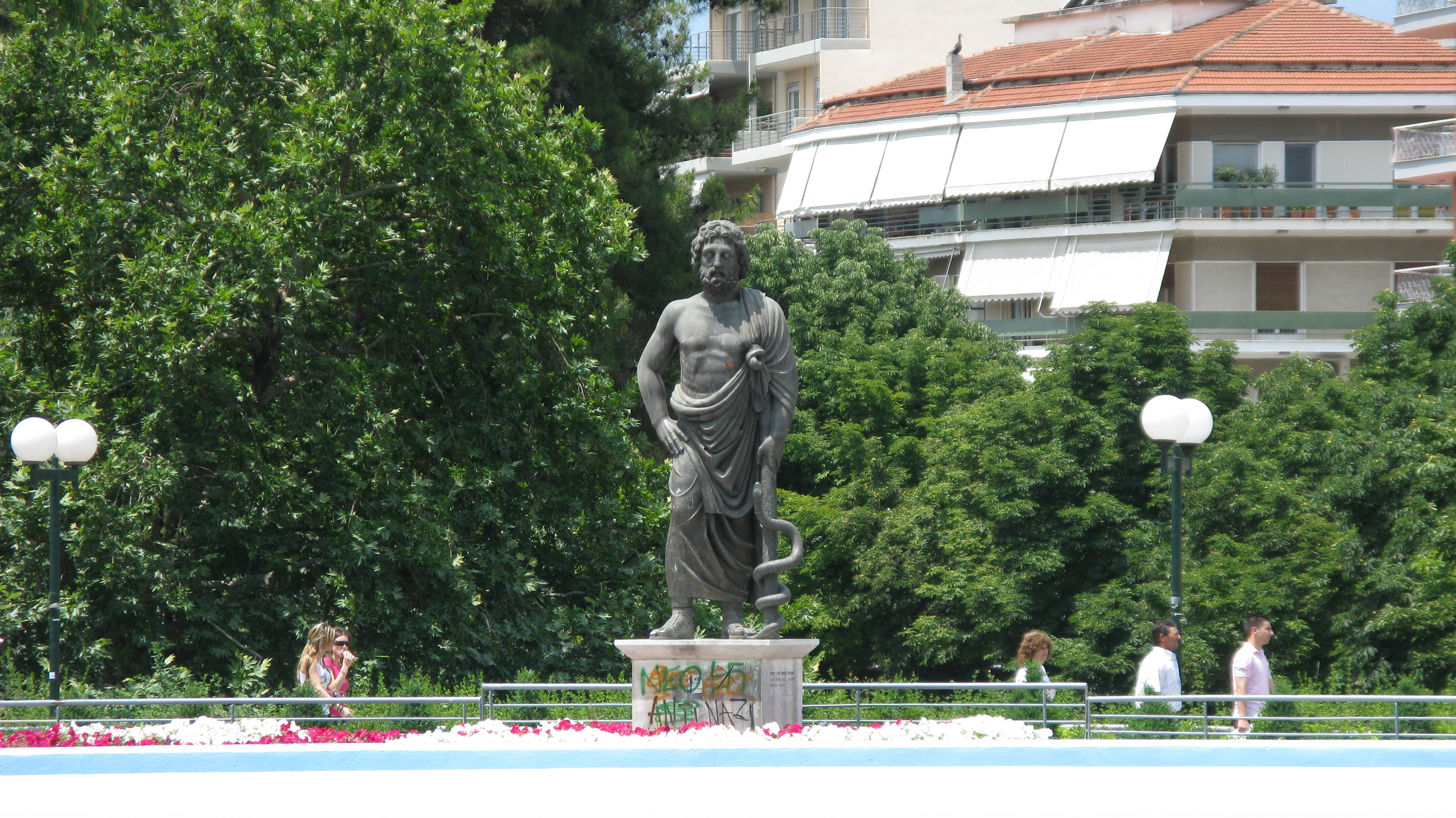
A statue of Asclepius

The region of Trikala has been inhabited since prehistoric times. The first indications of permanent settlement have been uncovered in the cave of Theopetra, and date back to approx. 49,000 BC. Neolithic settlements dating back to 6,000 BC have been uncovered in Megalo Kefalovriso and other locations.

The city of Trikala is built on the ancient city of Trikka or Trikke, which was founded around the 3rd millennium BC and took its name from the nymph Trikke, daughter of Peneus, or according to others, daughter of the river god Asopus. The ancient city was built at a defensive location in between the local hill and the river Lithaios. The city became an important center in antiquity and it was considered to be the birthplace and main residence of the healing god Asclepius. The city exhibited one of the most important and ancient of Asclepius' healing temples, called asclepieia. The city is mentioned in Homer's Iliad as having participated in the Trojan War with thirty ships under Asclepius' sons Machaon and Podalirius. In the Mycenean period, the city was the capital of a kingdom, and later it constituted the main center of the Thessalian region of Estaiotis, which occupied roughly the territory of the modern Trikala Prefecture.

In historical times, the city of Trikke and the surrounding area experienced prosperity. It fell to the Achaemenid Persians in 480 BC, while ten years later it joined the Thessalian monetary union. In 352 BC it was united with the Macedonia of Philip II. The city became a location of hard battles between Macedonia and Rome. While Philip V of Macedon and his son Perseus tried to keep the city, after 168 BC it fell to the Roman Republic.

=== Middle Ages ===
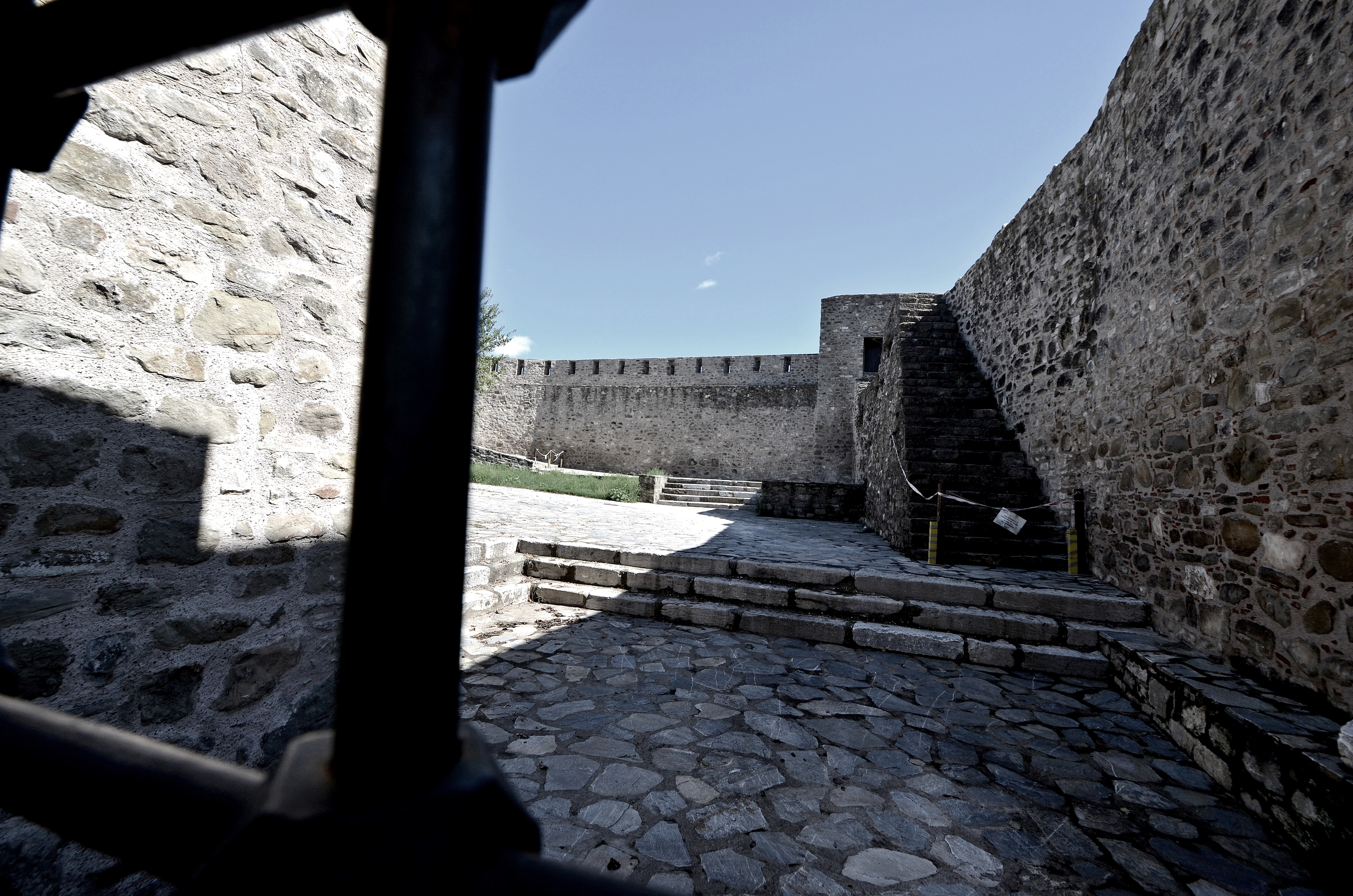
Inside the Byzantine castle

While the area was considered to be firmly under the rule of the Byzantine Empire, it was invaded nevertheless by a succession of raiders and nomadic tribes. Some of these tribes that raided the area include: Goths (396), Huns (447), Slavs (577), Bulgarians (986–1000), Normans (1082/3), Catalans (1309–1311).

The current name of Trikala first appears in the 11th-century Strategikon of Kekaumenos, where "Trikalitan Vlachs" are mentioned, and then in the early 12th-century Alexiad of Anna Komnene. Later in the century, the Arab traveller and geographer al-Idrisi recorded the town as "an important agrarian center with abundant vineyards and gardens" (T.E. Gregory).

After the dissolution of the Byzantine state by the Fourth Crusade in 1204, Trikala does not appear to have fallen into Frankish hands, but became part of the Despotate of Epirus. Epirote rule lasted until 1259, when the town was taken without resistance by the Empire of Nicaea (after 1261 the renewed Byzantine Empire) following the Battle of Pelagonia. In the early 14th century the town was the capital of a semi-independent domain under the sebastokrator Stephen Gabrielopoulos, which extended across much of western Thessaly and Macedonia. After his death in 1332/3 the city, along with most of Gabrielopoulos' lands, was seized by the Epirote ruler John II Orsini, but he was in turn expelled and the area incorporated into the Byzantine Empire by Andronikos III Palaiologos.

In 1348, Thessaly was conquered by Stefan Dušan and incorporated into the newly established Serbian Empire. The Serbian general Preljub was made the region's governor, and established himself at Trikala. In 1359, Dušan's half-brother Symeon Uroš established his court at Trikala, and in 1366/7 he founded the Meteora monasteries nearby. Symeon was succeeded by his son John Uroš, and he in turn by the local magnates Alexios Angelos Philanthropenos and Manuel Angelos Philanthropenos, who ruled until the Ottoman conquest of Thessaly in 1393/4.

=== Ottoman period ===
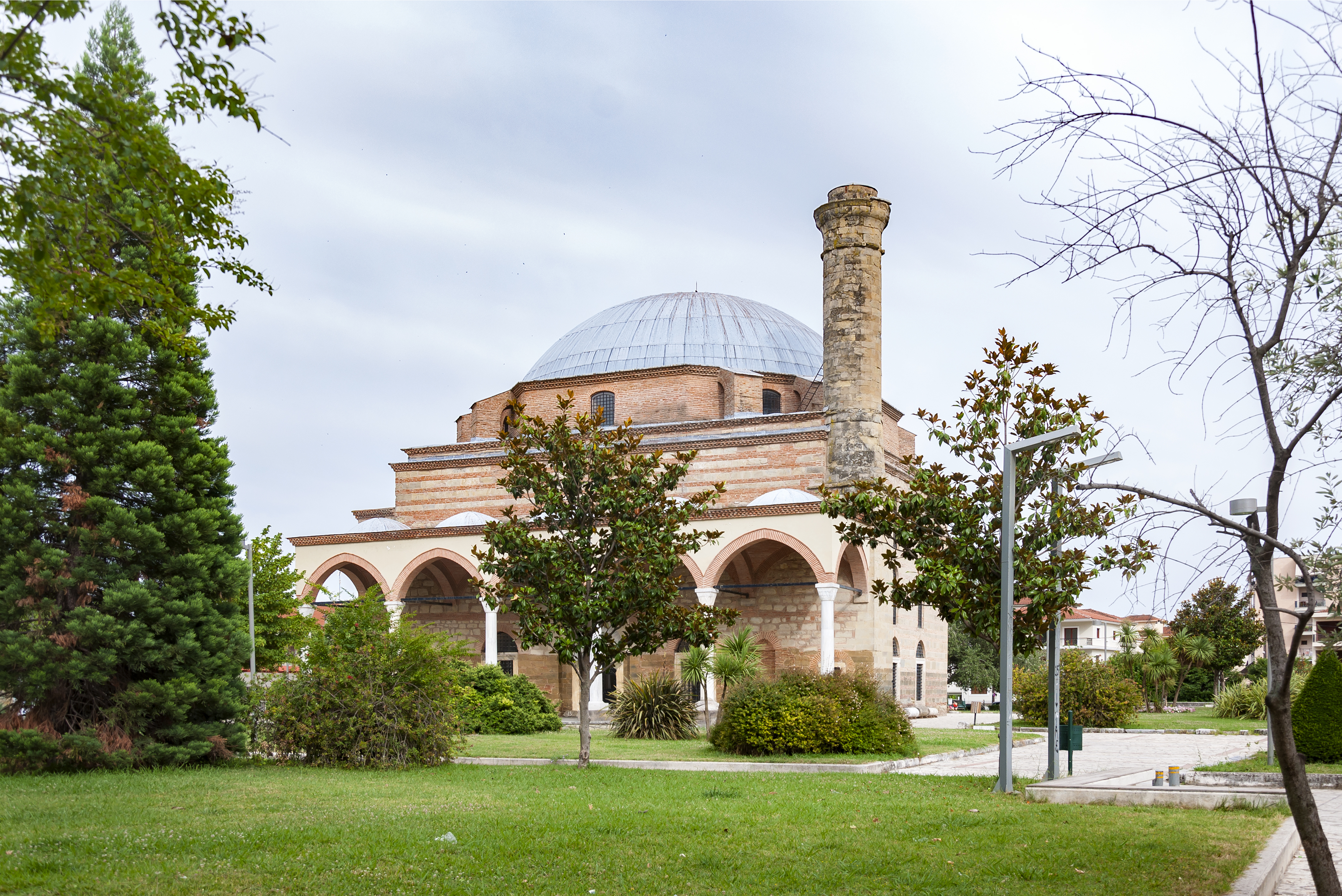
Osman Shah Mosque

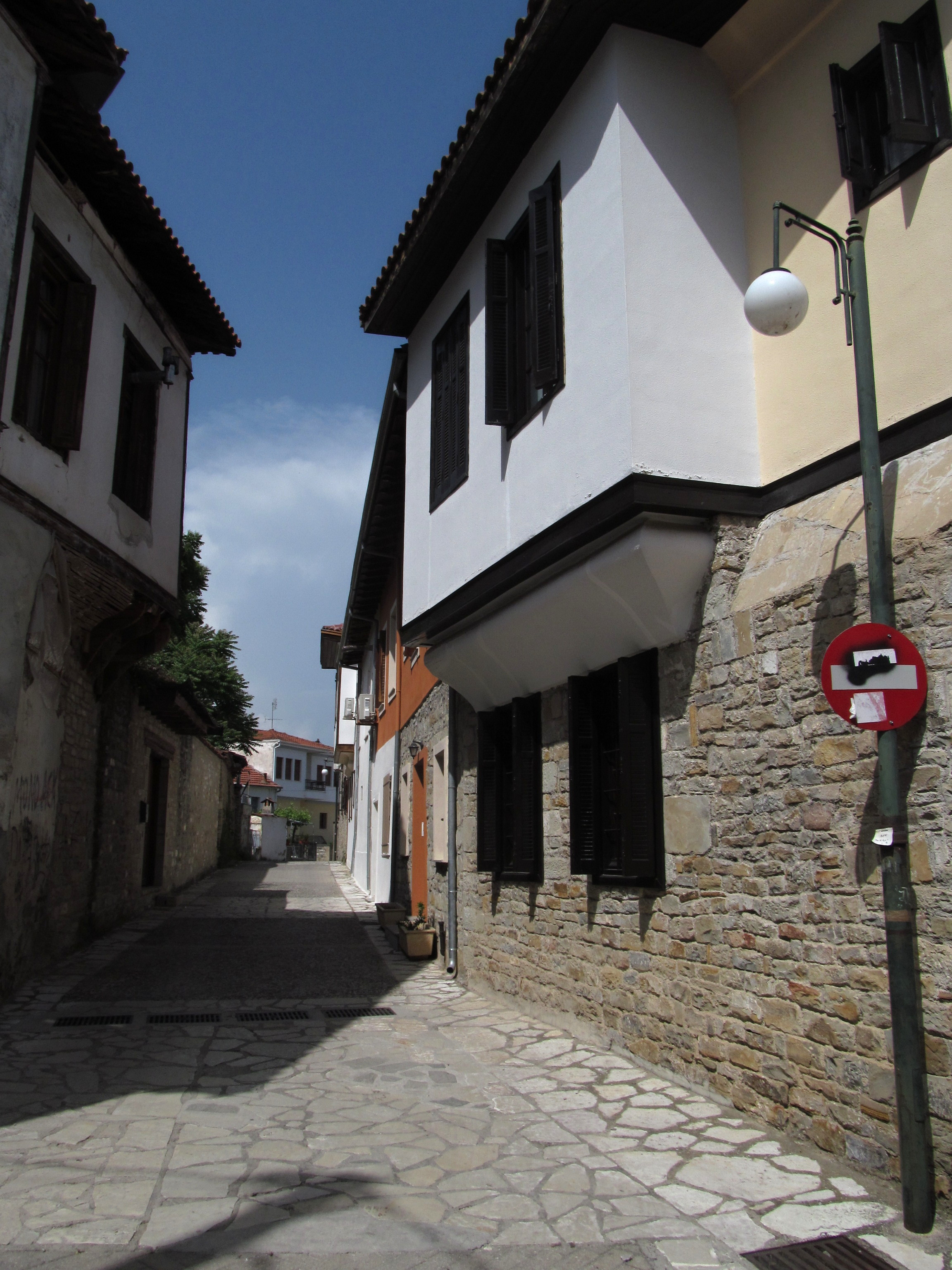
A street in Varousi

Under Ottoman rule, the city was called Tırhala. Its fortunes in the early period of Ottoman rule are unclear: it is reported as being part of a large sanjak under Ahmed, the son of Evrenos Bey, but in the early 15th century it formed part of the domain of Turahan Bey, who brought in Muslim settlers and granted privileges to the local Greek population. Turahan and his son and successor, Ömer Bey, erected many buildings in the city, helping it, in the words of the historian Alexandra Yerolimpos, to "[acquire] the appearance of a typical Ottoman town, with mosques, medreses, a hammam, imaret, khan and karwansaray extending beyond the citadel and the Varoussi (Varosh) quarter which remained Christian".

As the administrative center of the local province (the Sanjak of Trikala), the city attracted Muslim immigrants and had large Muslim and Jewish communities: in the 1454/5 census, the city had 2,453 inhabitants (251 Muslim families and 9 widows, and 212 Christian families and 73 widows); in 1506, the city numbered 3,100 inhabitants, with 260 Muslim, 310 Christian and 19 Jewish families; in 1520/38, the number had risen to 301 Muslim, 343 Christian, and 181 Jewish families. The city also became an important intellectual center during these years (1543–1854) with the Trikke School (and later Greek School), where famous intellectuals of the time, such as Dionysius the Philosopher, taught. Christian children from Trikala also became Janissaries. According to the 1603-4 "eşkal defter" Christian boys from the villages around the town were included in the batch that the Turnacıbaşı, the Chief collection officer levied. During the 18th and 19th centuries, the city was a center of the Modern Greek Enlightenment (Diafotismos). The Trikkala School operated during the Ottoman period, providing education in the Greek language.

The 17th-century Ottoman traveller Evliya Çelebi reports that the city had 2,300 houses divided into sixteen Muslim and eight Christian quarters (mahalla); eight mosques, of which only the city's main mosque, the Osman Shah Mosque built by Mimar Sinan, survives today; four hammams; six tekkes; and the probably exaggerated number of 1,000 shops, although Evliya curiously does not mention the city's impressive bezesten (covered market) which was demolished in the early 20th century. The city was largely burned down in a great fire in 1749, a destruction repeated by Albanian irregulars following an abortive uprising by the local Christian population during the Orlov Revolt. Despite the destruction, its population seems to have remained the same, ca. 25,000, until the outbreak of the Greek Revolution in 1821. By 1840, it reportedly had only 10,000 inhabitants, with the last Ottoman census in 1877/8 listing 25,000 inhabitants for the entire sanjak of Trikala.

=== Modern period ===
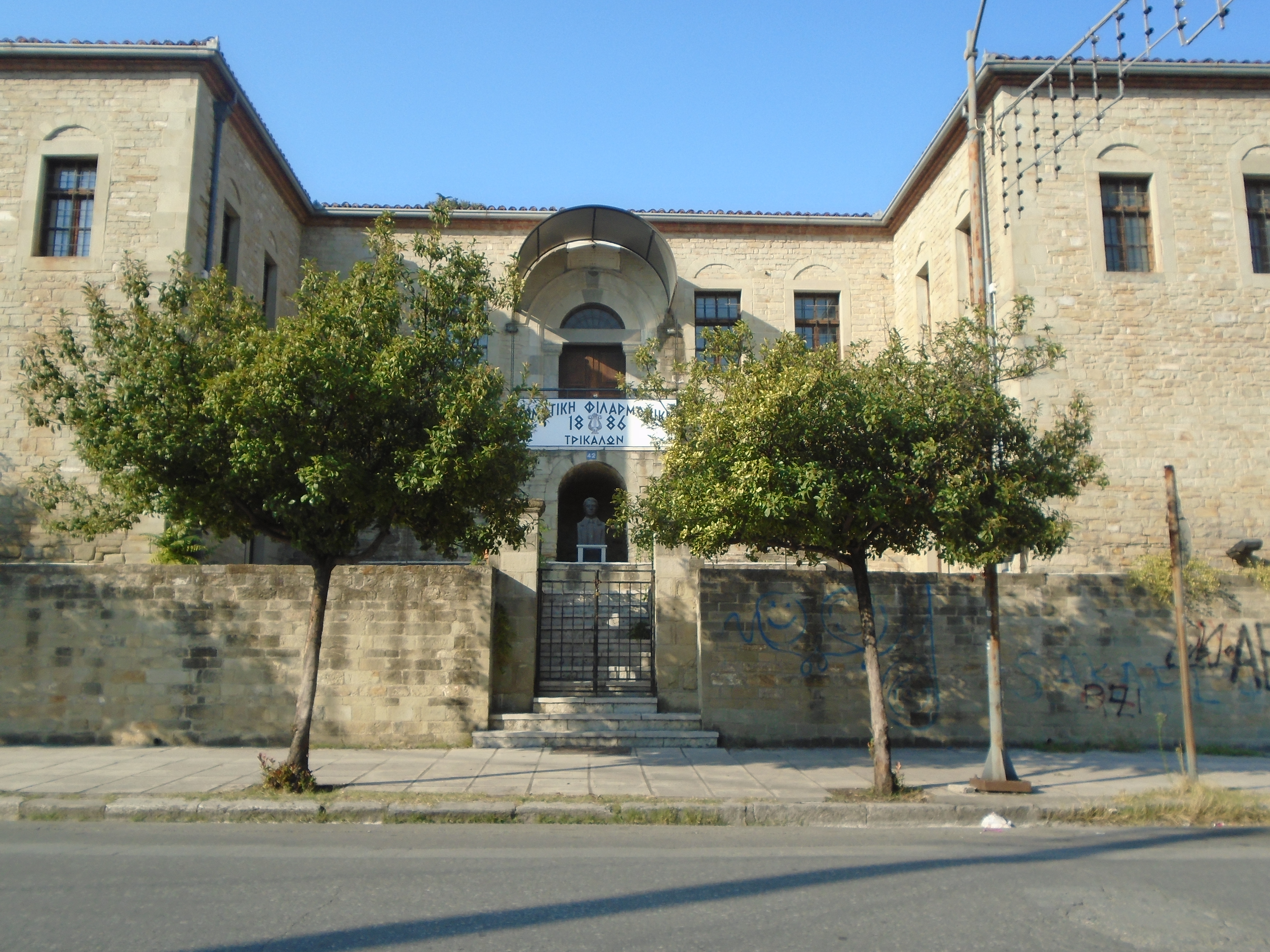
Dorothea School houses also the Philharmonic Society of Trikala

On 23 August 1881 with the Treaty of Constantinople between the Ottoman Empire and the Kingdom of Greece, the city passed in Greek sovereignty, along with the rest of Thessaly. It became occupied again by Ottoman forces briefly during the Greco-Turkish War of 1897. In the years that followed, Trikala played a fundamental role in the rural workers' mobilizations, in the early 20th century, against the Thessalian landlords (Greek: Τσιφλικάδες). Trikala eventually became the city that the first Agricultural Cooperative of Greece was founded, in 1906.

Historically, Trikala and its surroundings had a notable concentration of Aromanians, including from other regions.

Following the cession of Thessaly to Greece in 1881, the city transitioned from a traditional Ottoman layout to a characteristic 19th-century new urban plan. This transformation incorporated a Hippodamian grid and introduced Neoclassical architecture throughout the city center, significantly reshaping the urban landscape during the late 19th and early 20th centuries. In the following decades, particularly after World War II, the architectural style evolved to adopt modern trends; however, a large number of listed buildings, architectural monuments, and historic districts have been successfully preserved to this day. In the 21st century, the city center of Trikala underwent pedestrianization, and the Lithaios river was environmentally revitalized.

== Sights ==
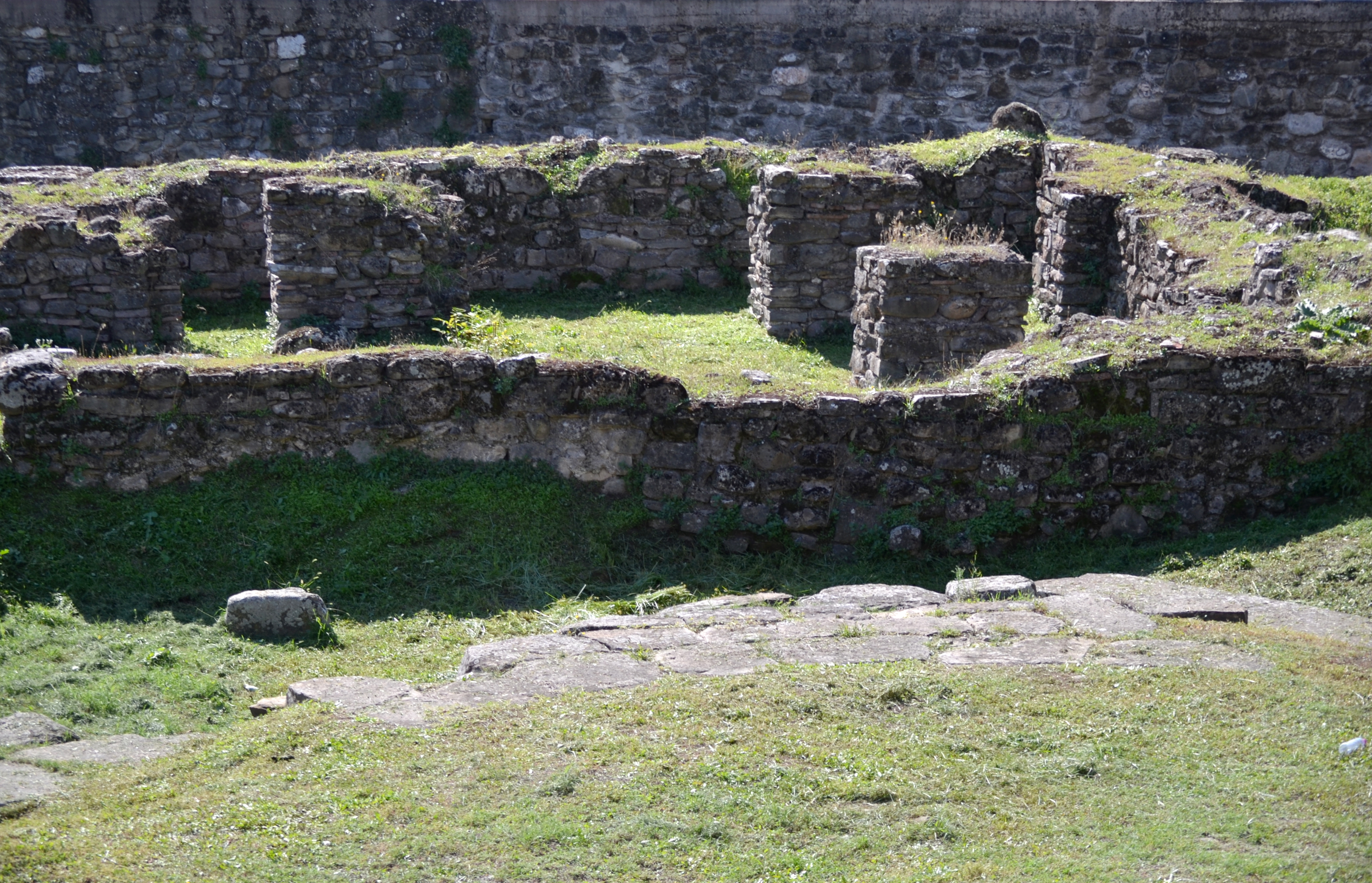
Ruins of the ancient greek Asclepieion in the archaeological site of Ancient Trikka

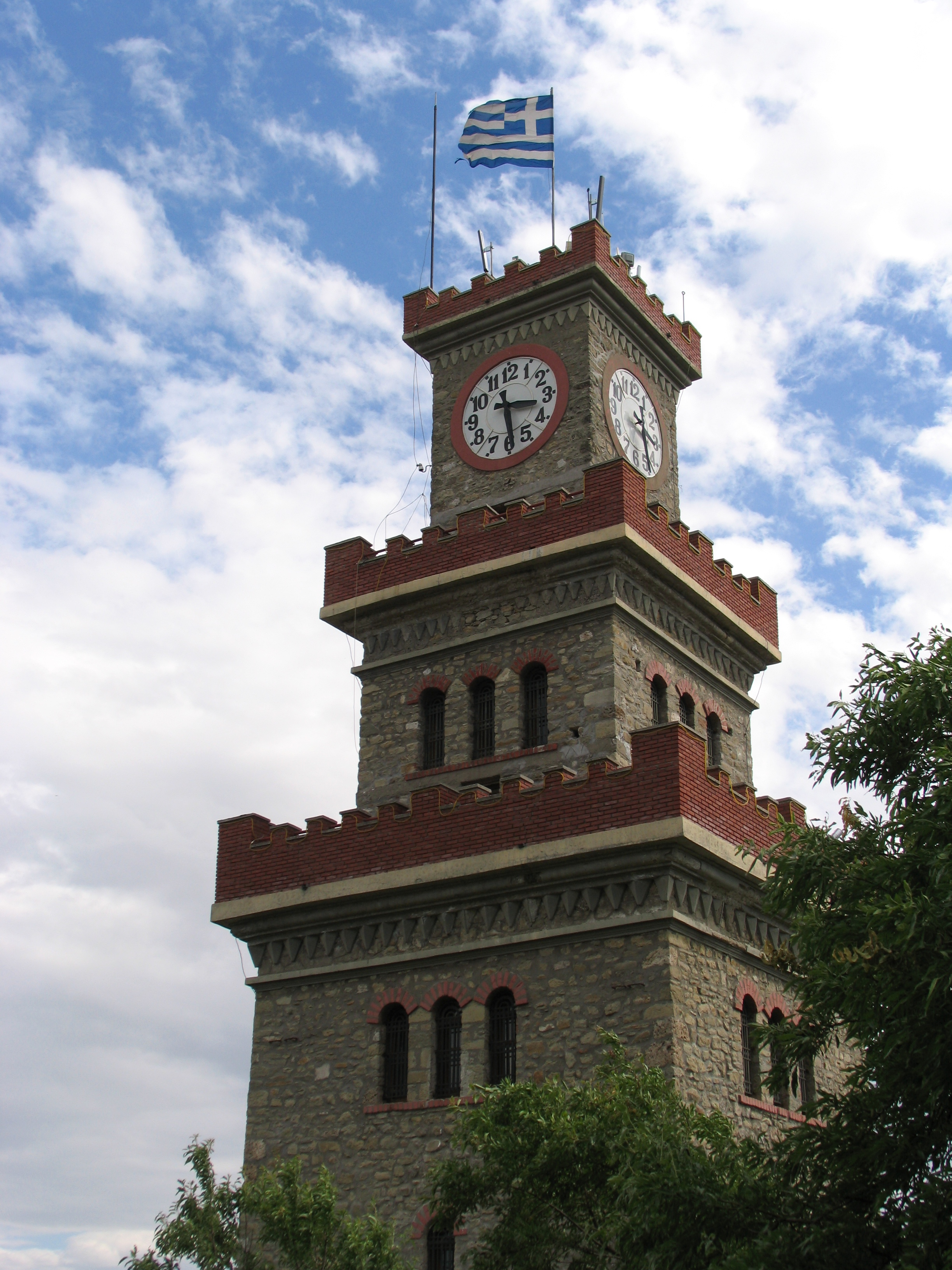
View of the clock tower, located within the Byzantine castle of the old town (Varousi).

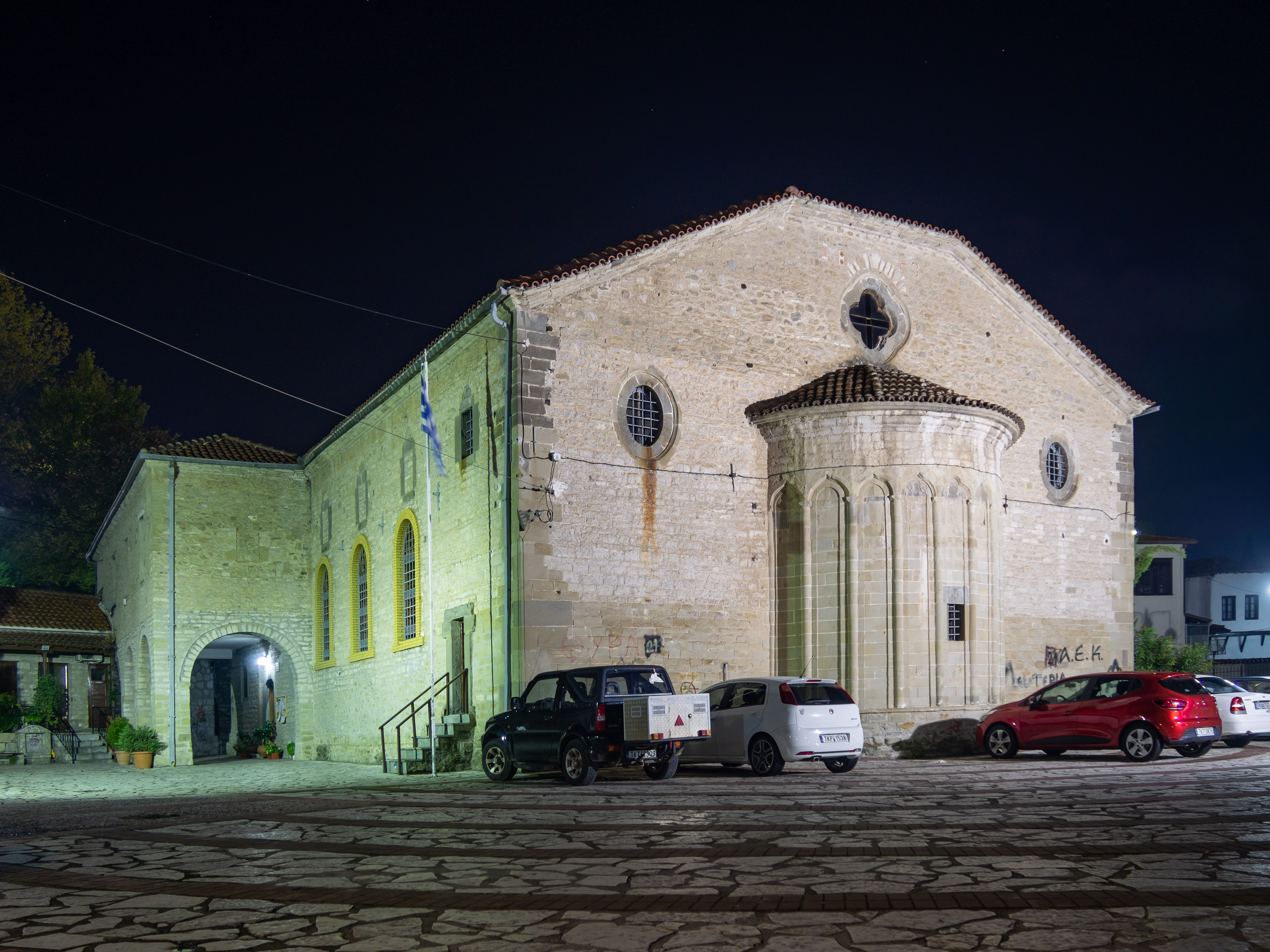
Panagia Faneromeni church in Varousi

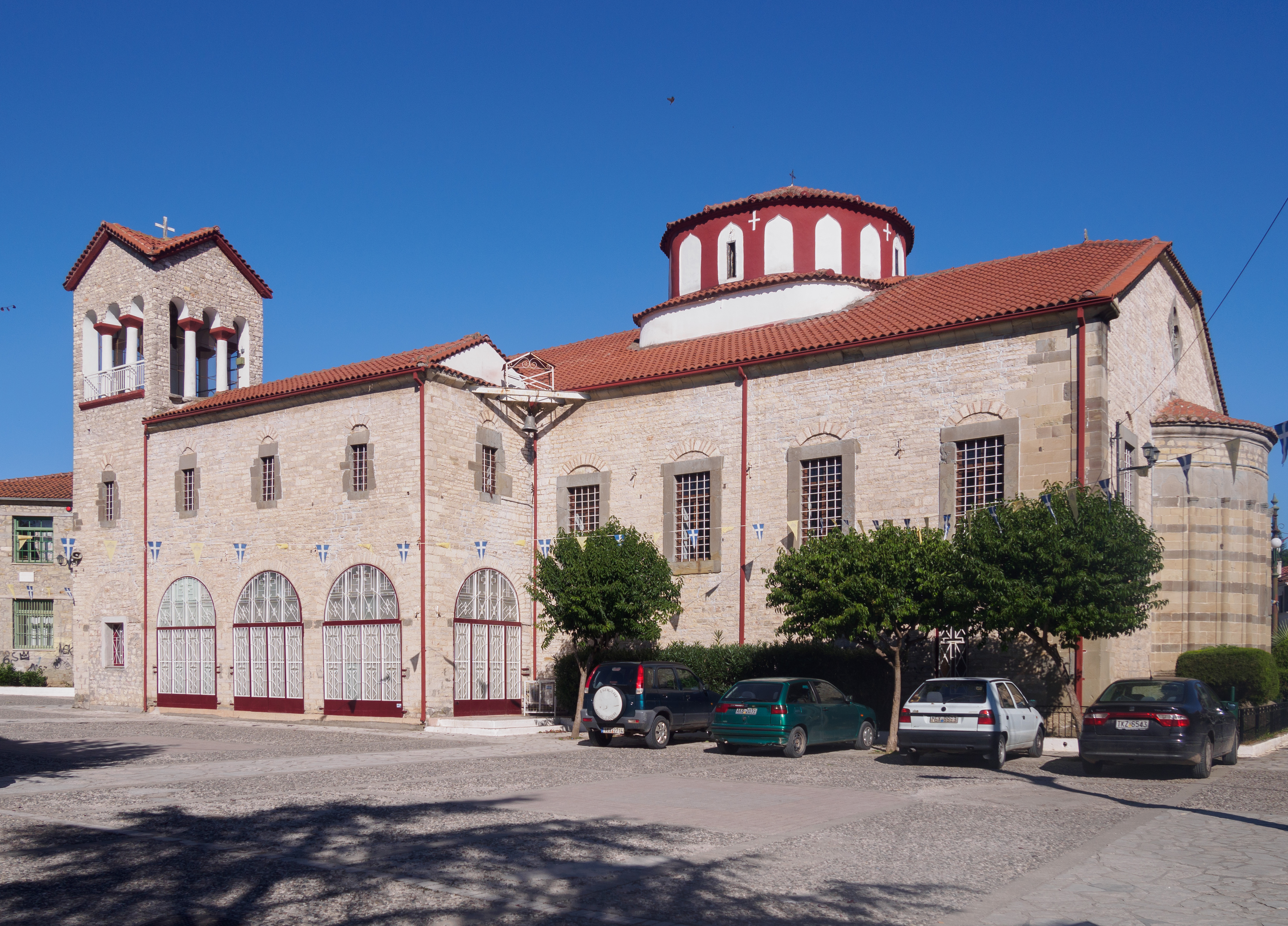
Panagia Episkepsi church in Varousi

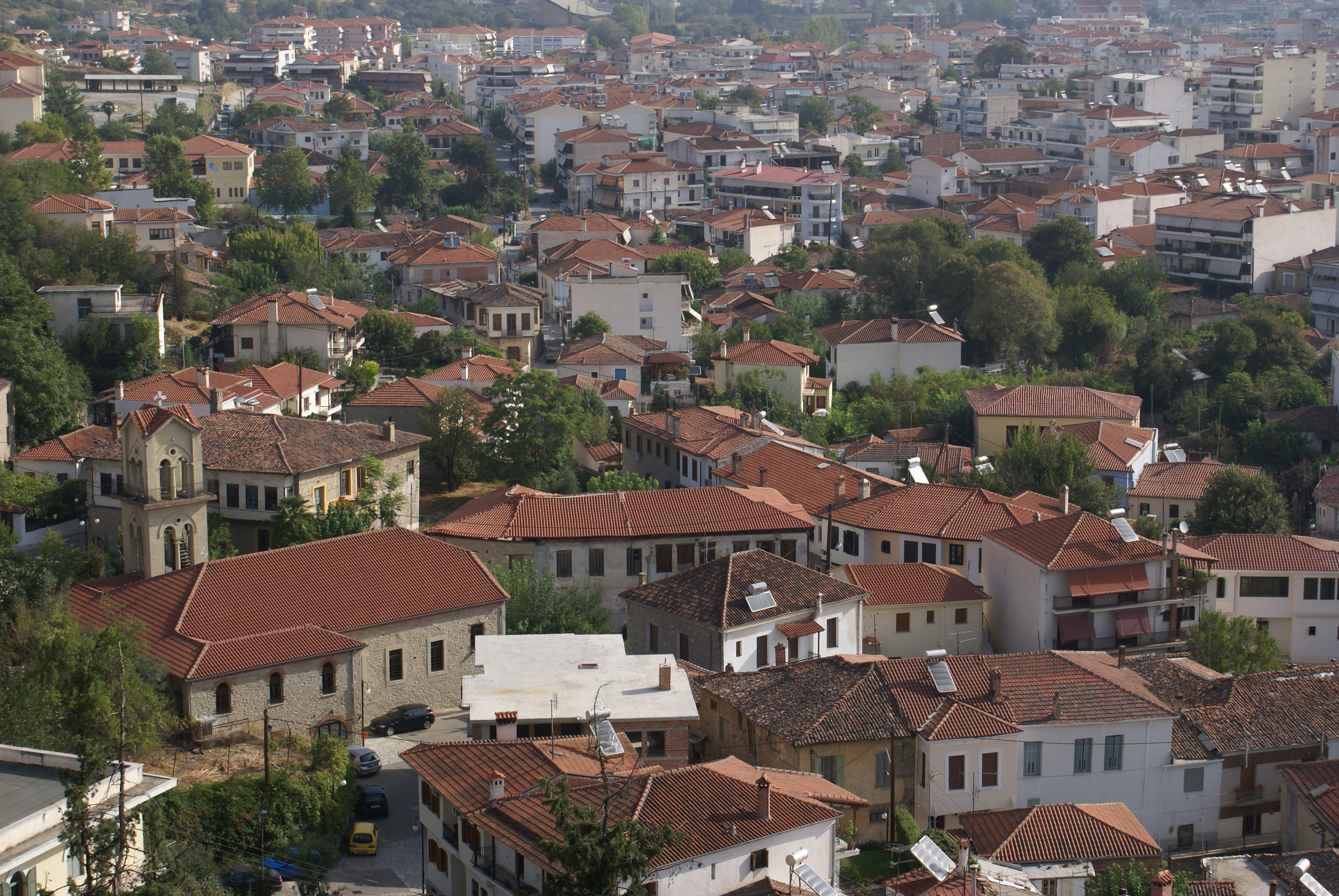
View of the old town of Varousi from the castle.

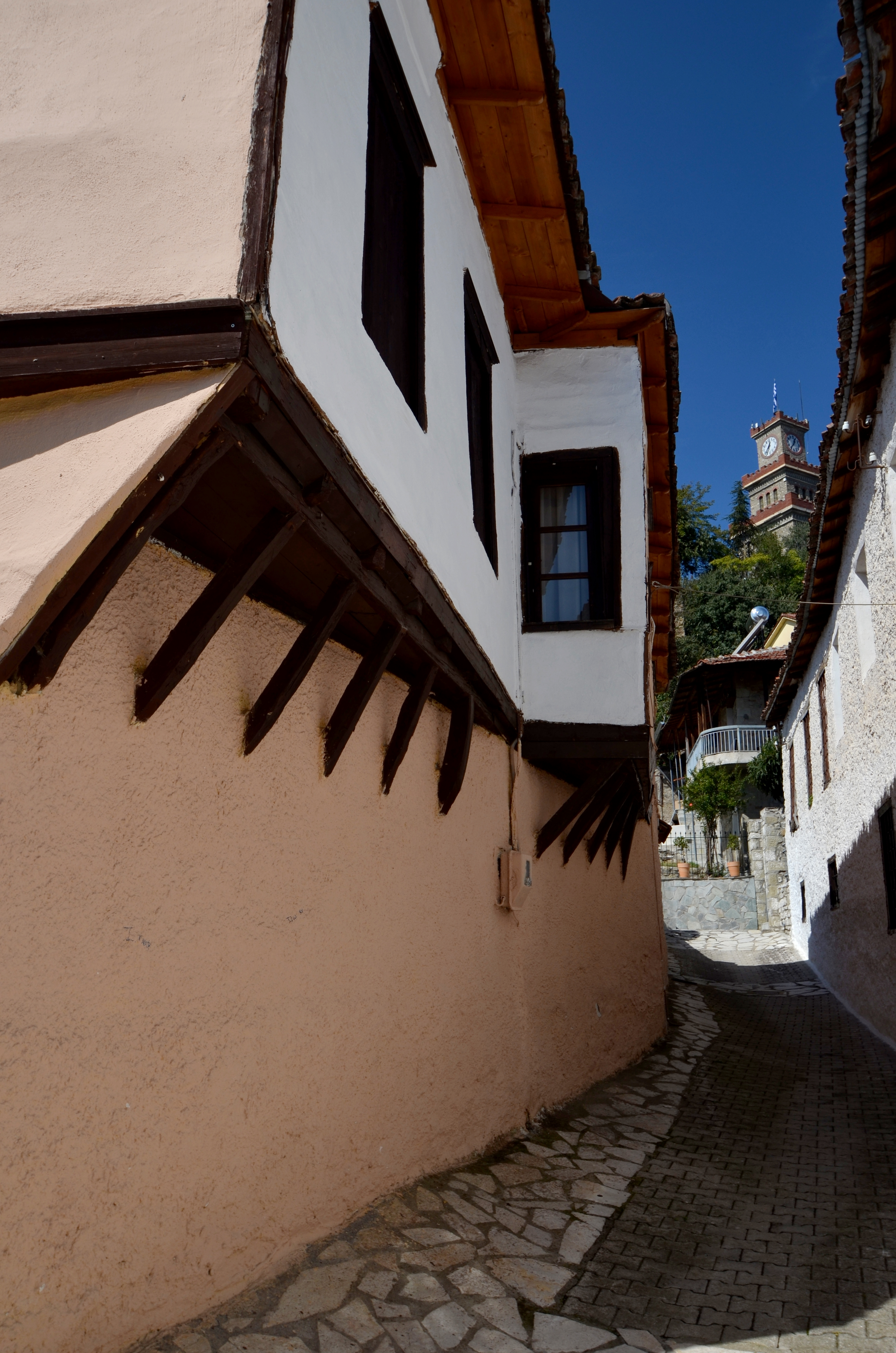
Traditional architecture in Varousi

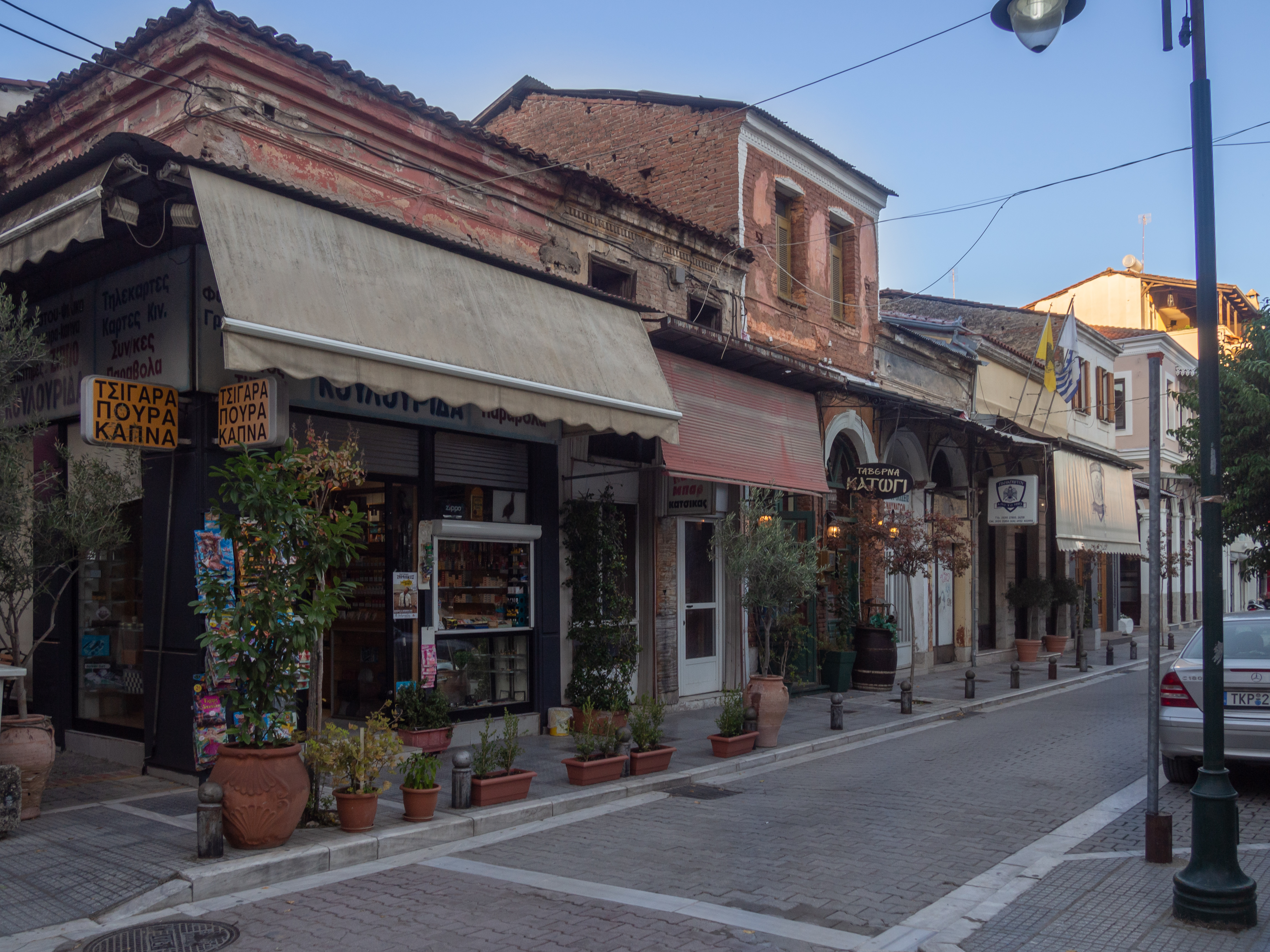
A street in Manavika

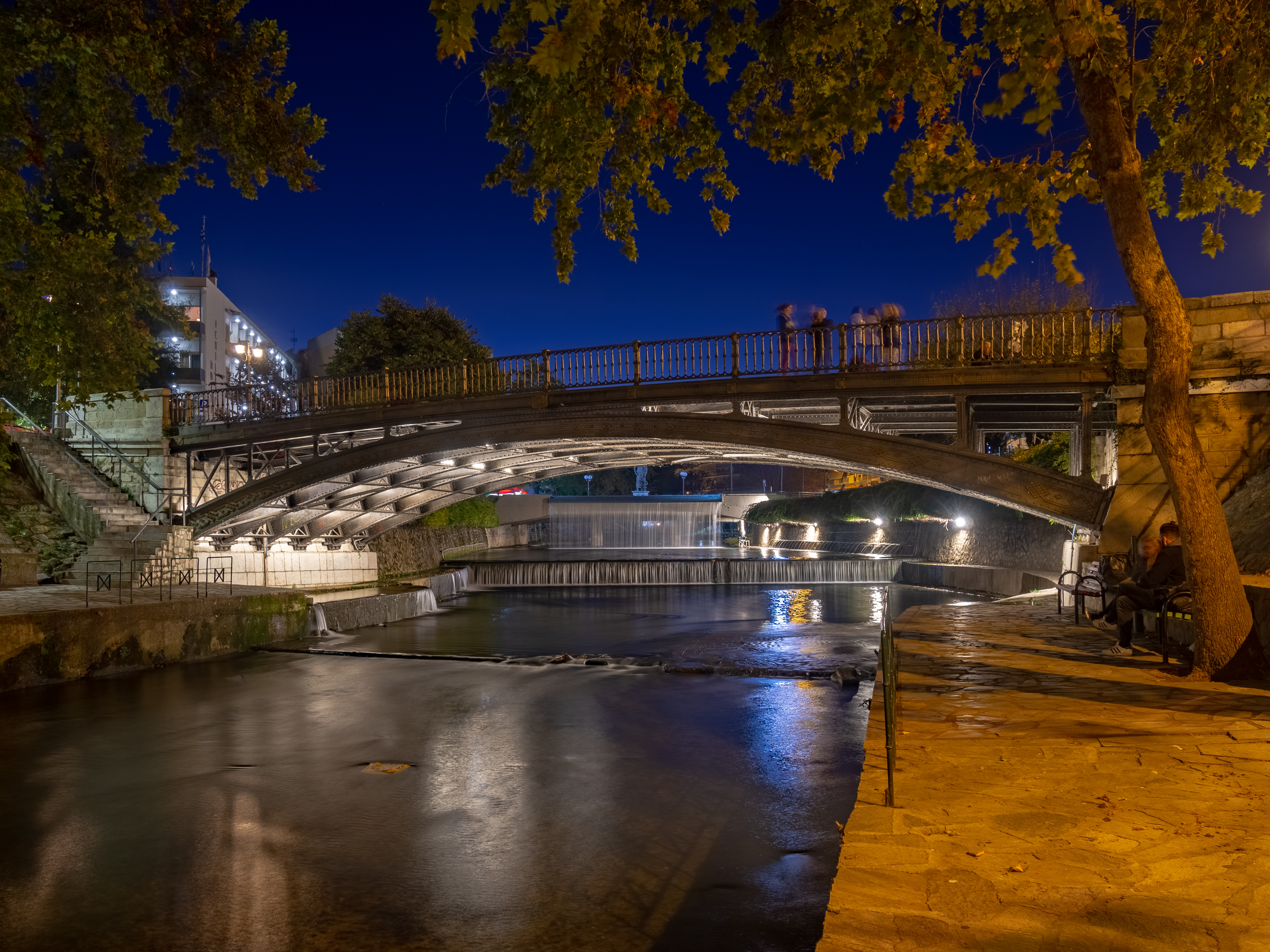
Central bridge

- The archaeological site of Asklepieion of Trikke, the most significant and most ancient of Greece, according to Strabo. Trikala (ancient Tricca or Trikke) is considered the birthplace of Asclepius, a hero and god of medicine in ancient Greek religion and mythology. The archaeological site of ancient Tricca is situated next to St. Nicholas Cathedral and the old town. Recent archaeological excavations at the site have uncovered the remains of an ancient theater.
- The Byzantine Castle, built by Justinian onto the acropolis of ancient Trikke in the 6th century AD. Later it was rebuilt by the Ottomans, who in the 17th century placed a huge clock tower, which was accompanied by a bell weighing 650 kg (1,433 lb). In 1936, another clock tower was placed and today remains the trademark of the city, while offers a panoramic view to the city. Under the castle lies the old town.
- The Old Town of Trikala, which consists of the districts Varousi and Manavika. Varousi was a Christian district of Trikala during the Ottoman rule and is located at the foot of the fortress. Until 1930, this part of the city was considered as the noble district of Trikala and is now a conservation area, with a large number of traditional old buildings, built between 17th and 19th century, preserved until today. In this part are located the oldest churches of the city, built between the 14th and the 19th century, all very close to each other. Following the district Varousi up to the central square is the part of the city called Manavika, a neighborhood of the old town with a uniform picturesque architecture. Here are located some of the best restaurants, coffee shops, and bars in town.
- The Greek Orthodox Churches of Trikala. The oldest churches of the city are located mainly in the old town, within the Varousi historic district. Those churches are: Church of Virgin Mary Faneromeni (1853), Church of Virgin Mary Episkepsi (1867), Saint Stephen Church (1882), Saint Paraskevi Church (1843), Saint Marina Church (1766), Saint Demetrius Church (1588), Church of Saints Anargyroi (renovated in 1575), Saint John the Baptist Chapel (1674), Church of Saint John the Merciful and Saint Panteleimon (14th C.) and the Saint Nicholas Cathedral. Other historic churches can be also found in many other parts of the city.
- The Hill of Prophitis Ilias (Prophet Elijah), a grove with a nice panoramic view of the city and within walking distance from the city center. On this hill is situated the church of the Prophet Elijah (built in 1897) and the municipal zoo.
- Lithaios river that bisects the city center being its renowned landmark and the Central Bridge, built in 1886, which connects the central square with the main pedestrian street. Additional recognizable points of the Lithaios river are the bridge with the statue of Asclepius and the characteristic lush river banks in the middle of the city center.
- The Mill of Matsopoulos, which was constructed in 1884 and today is a historical-industrial building being used as a museum and cultural center. During the Christmas period, the stone-built Matsopoulos Mill transforms into the “Mill of Elves”, Greece's most famous Christmas park.
- The Osman Shah Mosque (16th century), building designed by Mimar Sinan. Behind the mosque stands the mausoleum of Osman Shah, nephew of Sultan Suleyman the Magnificent.
- The Twin Ottoman bath (Hammam of Osman Shah). Built in the 16th century and probably designed by Mimar Sinan, underwent many changes and different uses throughout its history. The Twin Ottoman bath has been recently restored and nowadays is being used as a museum, hosting an archaeological ceramic collection and other temporary exhibitions. The Tsitsanis Μuseum is located on the upper floor of the building.
- The Trikala Train Station (built in 1886), the Courthouse (seat of the Ottoman authorities during the Turkish rule), the Folklore Museum and many more historical and neoclassical buildings.

== Nearby destinations ==
Trikala city is nearby many interesting destinations in the region. The city is near the rock formation Meteora, the town of Kalampaka, as well as the mountain range of south Pindus with its renowned sights i.e. the stone bridge of Pyli (16th c.), the Byzantine Church of Porta Panagia, the stone bridge (16th c.) and waterfall of Palaiokarya, Elati, Pertouli, Neraidochori, and Pertouli Ski Center.

== Administration ==
The municipality Trikala was formed at the 2011 local government reform by the merger of the following 8 former municipalities, that became municipal units:

- Estiaiotida
- Faloreia
- Kallidendro
- Koziakas
- Megala Kalyvia
- Paliokastro
- Paralithaioi
- Trikala

The municipality has an area of 607.585 km^{2}, the municipal unit 69.205 km^{2}.

=== Province ===
The province of Trikala was one of the provinces of the Trikala Prefecture. Its territory corresponded with that of the current municipalities Trikala, Farkadona and Pyli. It was abolished in 2006.

== Infrastructure ==
Trikala is home to the General Hospital of the Trikala Prefecture. The Physical Education and Sport Science department of the University of Thessaly is also located in Trikala, and was founded in 1994, with the first students being admitted in the academic year 1994-1995; it was originally housed in the Matsopoulos Park facility, but moved to the new Karyes campus in July 1999. Trikala has over 20 schools of secondary education, and a modern night technical school also functions in the town.

Trikala is the first smart city in Greece, integrating new technologies into the daily life of the municipality and providing government services to citizens by means of e-governance. Furthermore, it is in the process of becoming Greece's first 5G-ready city.

== Economy ==
The economy of Trikala is based on agriculture, with the surrounding Thessalian plain producing cotton, wheat, and livestock. In recent decades, the city has developed light industry, food processing, and regional commerce. The city also has a tourism sector, supported by its proximity to Meteora and its digital infrastructure initiatives.

== Transport ==
The city is next to the Motorway 3 (A3), or the Central Greek motorway (known also as E65 highway). KTEL, which is the main intercity public transport bus service in Greece, has frequent bus itineraries, connecting Trikala with the surrounding regions, Athens, Thessaloniki and many other cities of the mainland. The city is also served by a railway station. There are daily basis train connection to Athens and Thessaloniki.

== Climate ==
Trikala's continental influence isn't enough for the city to avoid being classified as a Mediterranean climate (Csa), although with significant diurnal temperature variation. Summers are very hot, with an August average high of 34.5 °C (94.1 °F). Meanwhile, autumn and spring are quite mild, lacking extremely low or high temperatures. Freezing temperatures occur sporadically, especially during winter nights. Occasional snowfall is observed but is generally not significant.

Climate data for Trikala Castle
Month	Jan	Feb	Mar	Apr	May	Jun	Jul	Aug	Sep	Oct	Nov	Dec	Year
Mean daily maximum °C (°F)	10.7 (51.3)	14.7 (58.5)	17.3 (63.1)	20.5 (68.9)	26.7 (80.1)	32.8 (91.0)	33.5 (92.3)	34.5 (94.1)	30.6 (87.1)	24.6 (76.3)	17.1 (62.8)	12.5 (54.5)	23.0 (73.3)
Mean daily minimum °C (°F)	1.8 (35.2)	3.9 (39.0)	5.7 (42.3)	8.7 (47.7)	13.4 (56.1)	18.5 (65.3)	20.3 (68.5)	19.9 (67.8)	17.3 (63.1)	12.1 (53.8)	8.9 (48.0)	5.9 (42.6)	11.4 (52.5)
Average precipitation mm (inches)	58.6 (2.31)	80.2 (3.16)	76.4 (3.01)	43.2 (1.70)	41.8 (1.65)	33.8 (1.33)	17.0 (0.67)	18.3 (0.72)	55.7 (2.19)	73.1 (2.88)	75.6 (2.98)	71.0 (2.80)	644.7 (25.4)
Source: 2010-2020 precipitation ,2019-2021 temperatures

== Sporting teams ==
- Trikala F.C., a football team that competed in the Greek first division, as recently as the 1999–00 season.
- Trikala 2000 B.C., a basketball team that competed in the Greek top division, in the 2008–09 and 2009–10 seasons. The team was dismantled following the team's relegation from the top division, and ensuing financial difficulties.
- Aries Trikala B.C., a basketball team that competed in the Greek top division for five seasons in a row (from 2013–14 till 2017–18. By season 2018-19 Aries Trikala B.C. will participate in the Greek A2 Basket League.

== Twin towns and sister cities ==
Trikala is twinned with:

- Amberg, Germany
- Antiparos, Greece
- Banan (Chongqing), China
- Castrop-Rauxel, Germany
- Dropull, Albania
- Pyatigorsk, Russia
- Talence, France
- Tucson, United States
- Vranje, Serbia
- Zugló, Hungary

== Historical population ==
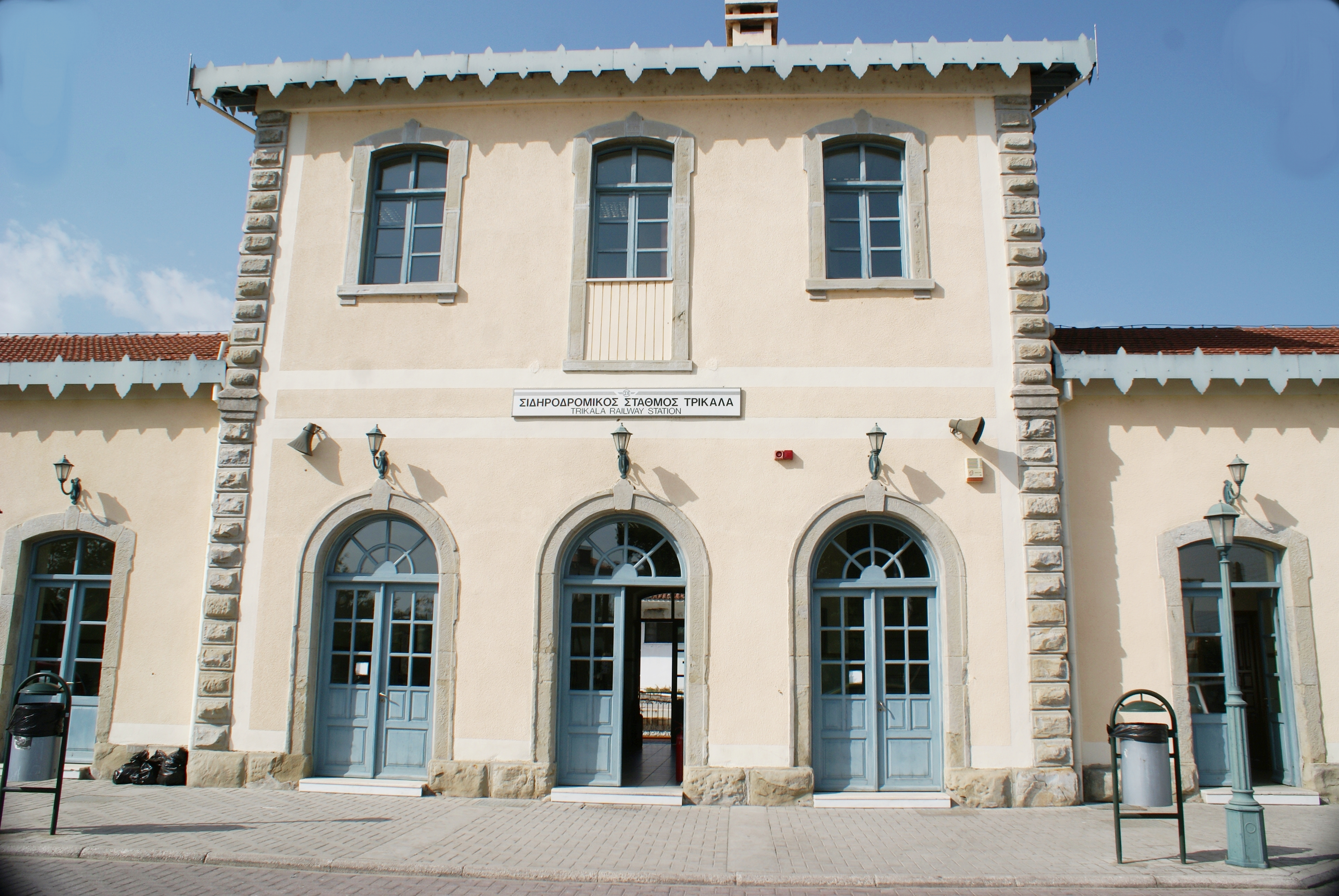
Railway station building.

Year	Municipal unit	Municipality
1991	48,857	74,832
2001	54,605	78,817
2011	61,653	81,355
2021	62,064	78,605

== Notable people ==
- Asclepius (Mythical), God of medicine in ancient Greek religion and mythology
- Oecumenius (about 990), Bishop of Trikka (now Trikkala)
- Evangelos Averoff (1910–1990), politician
- Stefanos Sarafis (1890–1957), major General in EAM-ELAS
- Sotirios Kyrgiakos (1979), footballer
- Dimitris Mitropanos (1948–2012), singer
- Christos Papanikolaou (1941), pole vaulter
- Efthimios Rentzias (1976), basketball player
- Vassilis Tsitsanis (1915–1984), songwriter and singer
- Ioannis Kellas (1908–1966), aviator
- Sofia Sakorafa (1957), javelin's thrower, politician
- Georgios Koltsidas (1970), footballer
- Dimitrios Sgouros (1969), pianist
- Gregory Kotrotsios (1984), professional basketball player
- Kostas Papanikolaou (1990), basketball player
- Stefanos Paparounas (1990), diver
- Achilles Cholevas, father of Greek footballer José Holebas
- Kostas Fortounis (1993), footballer
- Vasilis Gregoriou (1965), Greek chemist, researcher, Director & Chairman of NHRF
- Turhan Pasha Përmeti, Former prime minister of Albania.
- Christos Christou M.D., international president of Médecins Sans Frontières (MSF).

== See also ==
- Meteora
- Porta Panagia
- Pertouli

== Additional reading ==
- Messinas, Elias. (2022). The Synagogues of Greece: A Study of Synagogues in Macedonia and Thrace: With Architectural Drawings of all Synagogues of Greece. KDP, 190. ISBN 979-8-8069-0288-8
