= Prosilio =

Prosilio Προσήλιο
- Community
- Location within Greece
- Coordinates: 39°34′20″N 21°5′6″E
- Country: Greece
- Administrative region: Epirus
- Regional unit: Ioannina
- Municipality: North Tzoumerka
- Municipal unit: Tzoumerka

Population (2021)
  - Community: 79
- Time zone: UTC+2 (EET)
  - Summer (DST): UTC+3 (EEST)

Prosilio (Greek: Προσήλιο, literally "sunward place", before 1927: Δοβίσδανα - Dovisdana) is a village in the municipal unit of Tzoumerka (Ioannina, Epirus), Greece. It is situated on a mountainside of the Athamanika mountains, at 900 m elevation. It is 3 km southwest of Syrrako, 3 km west of Kalarites, 6 km north of Pramanta and 23 km southeast of Ioannina. Its population is 79 people (2021 census).

Prosilio is one of the Aromanian-speaking villages of Tzoumerka (including Syrrako, Kalarites, Matsouki, Palaiochori and Vathypedo).

== Population ==
Year	Population
1981	259
1991	159
2001	142
2011	101
2021	79

== History ==
The community Dovisdana was created in 1919 (Law 184A - August 19), and was renamed Prosilio in 1928 (Law 81A - May 14). The community became a part of the municipality of Tzoumerka and became a municipality district under Law 244A on December 4, 1997. Its inhabitants were not of Aromanian origin, but since they traded mainly with Aromanians, they understood and spoke the Aromanian language.

== See also ==
- List of settlements in the Ioannina regional unit
