= Palaiochori, Tzoumerka =

Palaiochori Παλαιοχώρι
- Community
- Location within Greece
- Coordinates: 39°35′46″N 21°03′22″E
- Country: Greece
- Administrative region: Epirus
- Regional unit: Ioannina
- Municipality: North Tzoumerka
- Municipal unit: Tzoumerka

Population (2021)
  - Community: 77
- Time zone: UTC+2 (EET)
  - Summer (DST): UTC+3 (EEST)

Palaiochori (Greek: Παλαιοχώρι, "old village"), also Palaiochori Syrrako is a mountain village in the municipality of North Tzoumerka in the Ioannina regional unit, northern Greece. It is built on the western slope of the Athamanika mountains, at 750 m elevation. It is on the watershed between two small rivers that flow toward the Arachthos. Its population is 77 people (2021 census). It is 4 km south of Vathypedo, 4 km northwest of Prosilio, 4 km west of Syrrako and 19 km southeast of Ioannina.

== History ==
During the Ottoman period and until 1880, Palaiochori formed a single community with current Syrrako, which fell along with other neighboring villages in the province (kaza) of Malakasi. Palaiochori was split from Syrrako in 1880 by the leader Goulas Anastasios Topalis (Goulas Tasios), despite persistent objections of the people from Syrrako who did not want the separation. The border of the two villages was formed by the ridge of Tsarkos-Priza-Plinos. Traditionally Palaiochori is considered to be the cradle of Syrrako. The direct link is shown by the way of life, manners and customs, the dozens of place names around Syrrako and Palaiochori and the common Aromanian language. An independent section of the Cretan Regiment under leader Trypogiorgos captured Palaiochori from the Ottomans at the end of 1912 and freed its inhabitants from the jail house in Trikas and moved them out even from the Papastathi bridge over the Arachthos river.

== Demographics ==
Year	Population
1981	146
1991	129
2001	143
2011	66
2021	77

Palaiochori has an Aromanian population and is an Aromanian speaking village. In the early 21st century, elderly people were bilingual in the community language and Greek, whereas younger residents under 40 might have understood the community language but did not use it.

== See also ==
- List of settlements in the Ioannina regional unit
