= Petrovouni, Ioannina =

Petrovouni Πετροβούνι
- Community
- Location within Greece
- Coordinates: 39°34′25″N 21°0′22″E
- Country: Greece
- Administrative region: Epirus
- Regional unit: Ioannina
- Municipality: North Tzoumerka
- Municipal unit: Tzoumerka

Population (2021)
  - Community: 87
- Time zone: UTC+2 (EET)
  - Summer (DST): UTC+3 (EEST)

Petrovouni (Greek: Πετροβούνι, meaning "rocky mountain", before 1927: Βασταβέτσι - Vastavetsi) is a village in the municipal unit of Tzoumerka (Ioannina, Epirus), Greece. It is situated on a mountainside of the Athamanika mountains, above the left bank of the river Arachthos, at 1,030 m elevation. It is 3 km north of Chouliarades, 9 km west of Syrrako and 17 km southeast of Ioannina. Its population is 87 people (2021 census).

== Population ==
Year	Population
1981	977
1991	136
2001	119
2011	79
2021	87

== See also ==
- List of settlements in the Ioannina regional unit
