= Fortosi =

Fortosi Φορτόσι
- Community
- Location within Greece
- Coordinates: 39°31′N 20°59′E
- Country: Greece
- Administrative region: Epirus
- Regional unit: Ioannina
- Municipality: North Tzoumerka
- Municipal unit: Katsanochoria

Population (2021)
  - Community: 83
- Time zone: UTC+2 (EET)
  - Summer (DST): UTC+3 (EEST)
- Vehicle registration: ΙΝ

Fortosi (Greek: Φορτόσι) is a village and a community in the municipal unit of Katsanochoria, Ioannina regional unit, Epirus, Greece. The community consists of the villages Fortosi, Kostitsi, Patero and Nistora. Fortosi is situated in the northern foothills of the mountain Xerovouni, west of the Arachthos valley, at about 800 m elevation. It is 10 km west of Pramanta, 21 km southeast of Ioannina and 39 km north of Arta. There is an ancient castle built around the 4th century BC 2 km south of Patero.

== Population ==
Year	Population village	Population community
1981	-	238
1991	49	-
2001	58	208
2011	38	135
2021	27	83

== See also ==
- List of settlements in the Ioannina regional unit
