= Chouliarades =

Chouliarades Χουλιαράδες
- Community
- Location within Greece
- Coordinates: 39°33′N 21°00′E
- Country: Greece
- Administrative region: Epirus
- Regional unit: Ioannina
- Municipality: North Tzoumerka
- Municipal unit: Tzoumerka

Population (2021)
  - Community: 165
- Time zone: UTC+2 (EET)
  - Summer (DST): UTC+3 (EEST)
- Vehicle registration: ΙΝ

Chouliarades (Greek: Χουλιαράδες) is a village in the municipality of North Tzoumerka, Greece. It is a traditional settlement since November 23, 1998 (Law 908D) and its code number is 12317201. The village is well known for its singing tradition: one of the villagers, Gakis Sontis, was recorded in 1930 by the Folklore Music Archive of Melpo Merlie.

== Geography ==
The village is built on the slopes of the Tzoumerka or Athamanio mountains at 1,000 m. It is 19 km southeast of Ioannina, 2.5 km west of Vaptistis and 2.5 km south of Petrovouni.

== Population ==
Historical population
Year	Pop.	±%
1981	442	—
1991	346	−21.7%
2001	119	−65.6%
2011	140	+17.6%
2021	165	+17.9%

== See also ==
- List of settlements in the Ioannina regional unit
