= Lakmos =

Mountain in Greece

- Λάκμος
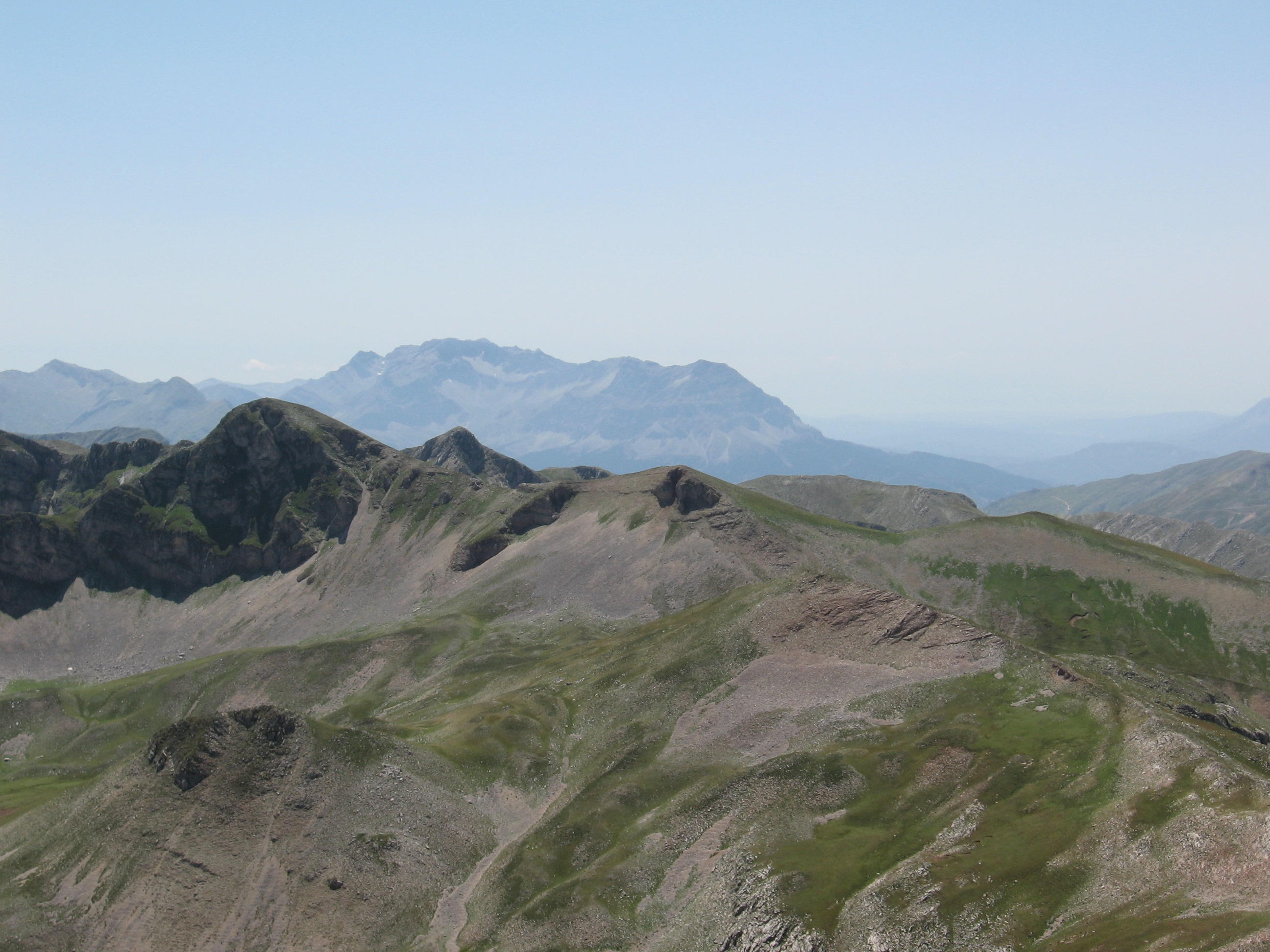
- Lakmos mountain

Highest point
- Elevation: 2,295 m (7,530 ft)
- Listing: List of mountains in Greece
- Coordinates: 39°41′02″N 21°07′23″E

Naming
- Pronunciation: Greek: [ˈlakmos]

Geography
- Location within Greece
- Location: southeastern Epirus

Lakmos (Greek: Λάκμος) is a mountain in eastern Ioannina and western Trikala regional units. The mountain is a part of the Pindus mountain range. Its highest peak is the Peristeri, at 2,295 m elevation. It stretches from the village Krapsi in the west to near Metsovo in the east, over a length of about 20 km (12 mi). The nearest mountains are the Athamanika to the south, the Lygkos to the north and the Mitsikeli to the west. It is drained by the river Arachthos and its tributaries to the north, west and south, and by the Acheloos to the east.

The nearest town is Metsovo, at its northeastern end. Other places in the mountains are Anthousa in the southeast, Anthochori in the north, Megali Gotista in the west and Vathypedo in the southwest. The A2 Egnatia Odos motorway (Igoumenitsa - Ioannina - Kozani - Thessaloniki - Alexandroupolis) passes north of the mountains.

== See also ==
- Achelous River
- Makedones
