= Lyngos =

Mountain range in Greece

- Λύγκος
- Location within Greece

Highest point
- Elevation: 2,177 m (7,142 ft)
- Listing: List of mountains in Greece
- Coordinates: 39.89°N 21.13°E

Naming
- Pronunciation: Greek: [ˈliɡos]

Geography
- Location: central Pindus range in northwestern Greece

Lyngos (Greek: Λύγκος), also transliterated as Lygos, is a remote mountain range in the eastern Ioannina and the western Grevena regional unit in northwestern Greece. It is a part of the Pindus mountain range. Its highest point is the Avgo, at 2,177 m elevation. The Lyngos mountains lie in a horseshoe shape around the Valia Kalda (Βάλια Κάλντα) valley, which exits towards the Aoos valley to the west. The Valia Kalda is part of the Pindus-Valia Kalda National Park, founded in 1966. It is one of the coldest and wettest regions of Greece. The mountains are densely forested, with alpine meadows in the highest elevations.

The Lyngos mountains are drained by the river Aoos to the west and by the river Venetikos, a tributary of the Haliacmon, to the east. The nearest mountain ranges are the Vasilitsa to the north, Chasia to the east, Lakmos to the south and Tymfi to the west. The nearest villages are Vovousa to the west and Perivoli to the north. The town Metsovo is about 15 km to the south.
