= Pindus National Park =

National park of the Pindus Mountains in Greece

Pindus National Park (Valia Calda)
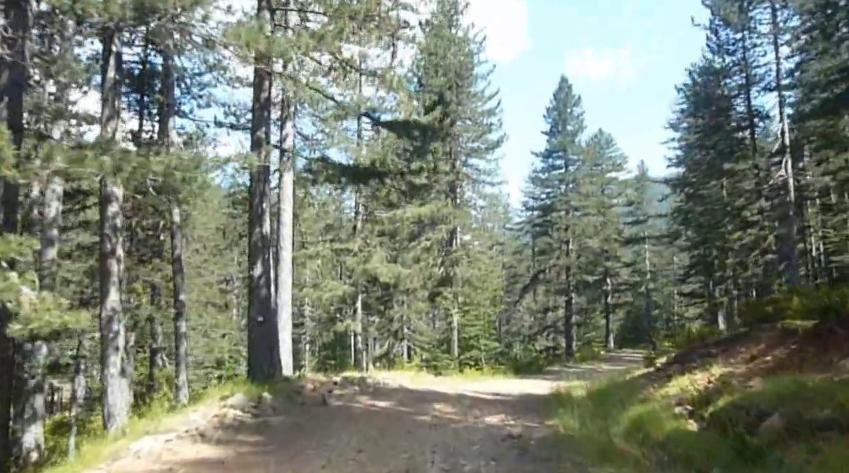
- Dirt road near Flegga peak

- Location within Greece
- Interactive map of Pindus National Park (Valia Calda)
- Location: West Macedonia and Epirus, Greece
- Nearest city: Ioannina
- Coordinates: 39°54′N 21°07′E
- Area: 6,927 hectares (17,120 acres)
- Established: 1966
- Governing body: National Forest Department (Greek Ministry of Agriculture)

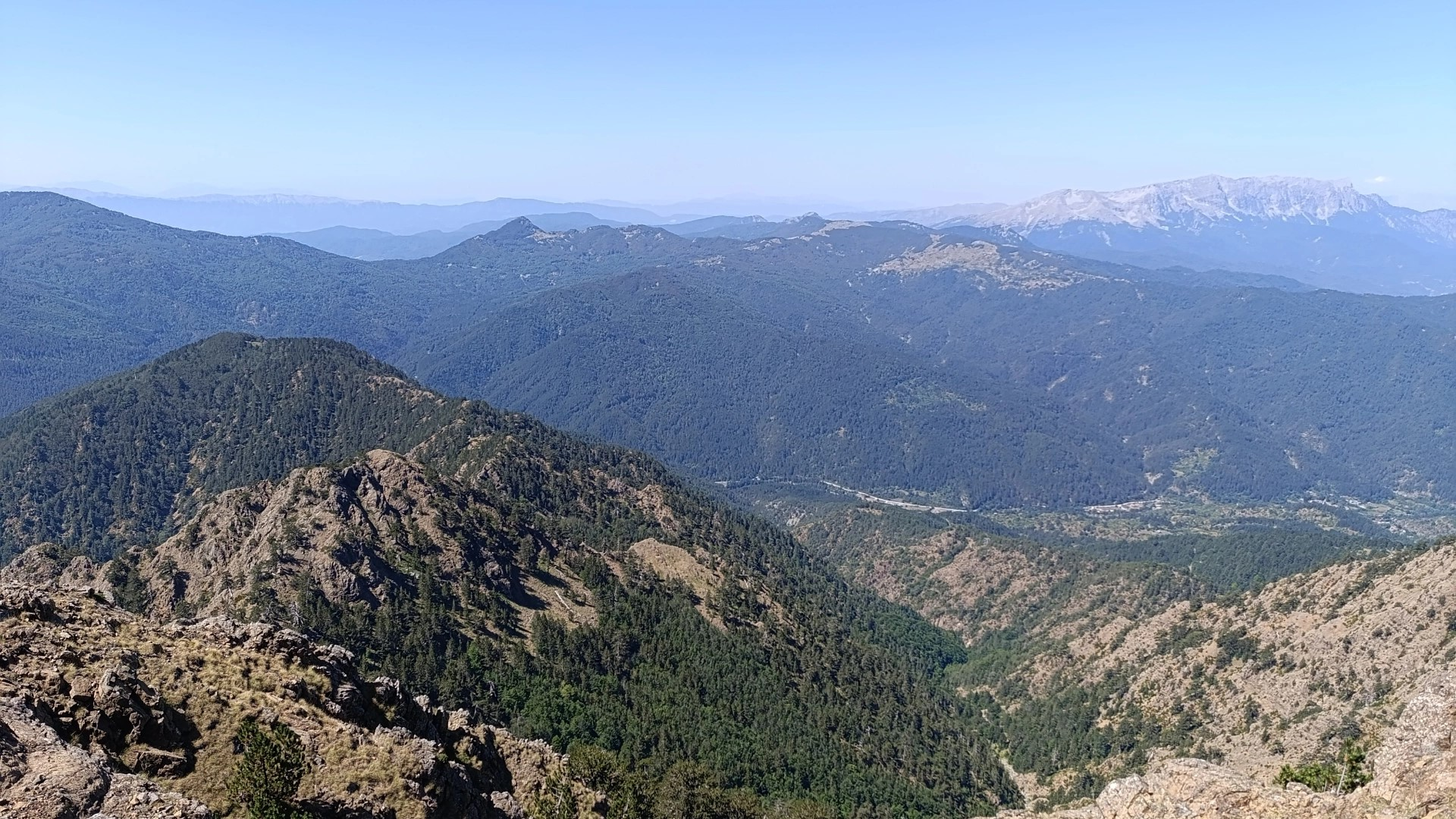
View from Augo Peak

Pindus National Park (Greek: Εθνικός Δρυμός Πίνδου Ethnikós Drymós Píndou), also known as Valia Calda (meaning the Warm Valley in Aromanian), is a national park in mainland Greece, situated in an isolated mountainous area at the periphery of West Macedonia and Epirus, in the northeastern part of the Pindus mountain range. It was established in 1966 and covers an area of 6,927 hectares (17,120 acres). The park's core zone, 3,360 hectares (8,300 acres), covers the greatest part of the Valia Calda valley and the slopes of the surrounding peaks.

The national park has an elevation range from 1,076 to 2,177 metres (3,530 to 7,142 ft) and is characterized by dense forests of European black pine and common beech, rocky ridges, several peaks over 2,000 metres (6,600 ft), rapid streams and mountain lakes. The area belong to the wider Pindus Mountains mixed forests ecoregion and is a representative part of Pindus mountain range. Moreover, it belongs to the Natura 2000 ecological network of protected areas and is one of the three places in Greece that hosts a population of brown bears.

== Geography ==
The park lies on the borders of Grevena and Ioannina regional unit, north of the town of Metsovo and near the villages of Vovousa, Perivoli and Milea. There are no settlements or any facilities inside the protected area's borders.

Several peaks reach an altitude of over 2,000 m (6,600 ft); these include Avgo, 2,177 m (7,142 ft), Kakoplevri, 2,160 m (7,090 ft), Flegga, 2,159 m (7,083 ft), Tria Sinora, 2,050 m (6,730 ft) and Aftia, 2,082 m (6,831 ft).

The underlying rock formations are mainly serpentine and they support a specialized range of plants.

== Climate ==
The park's climate is montane and varies according to elevation and aspect. Annual rainfall ranges 1,000 to 1,800 mm (39 to 71 in), whereas mean monthly temperatures vary between 0.9 to 21.4 °C (33.6 to 70.5 °F).

== Biology ==
=== Flora ===
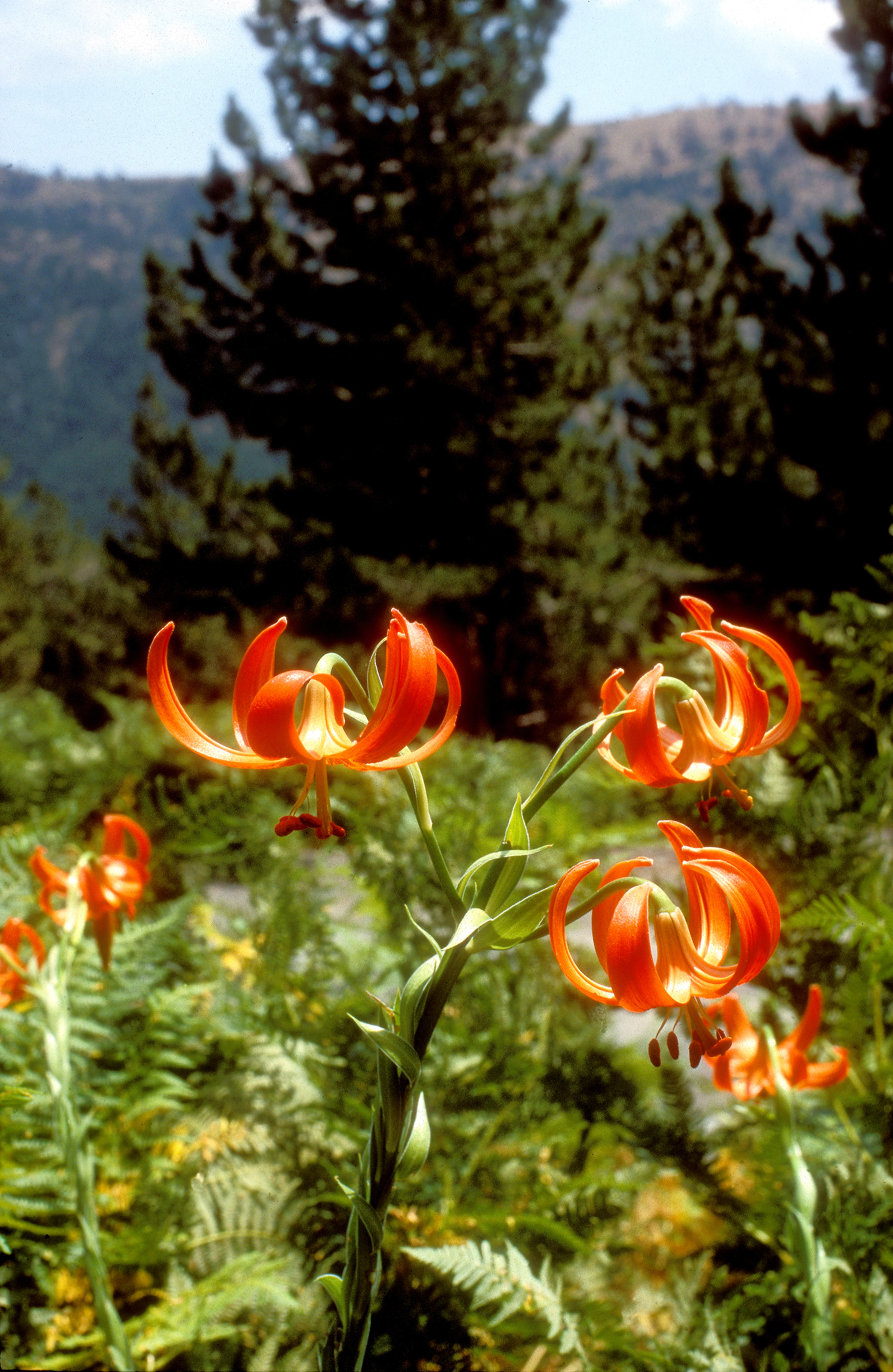
Lilium chalcedonicum in Pindus National Park

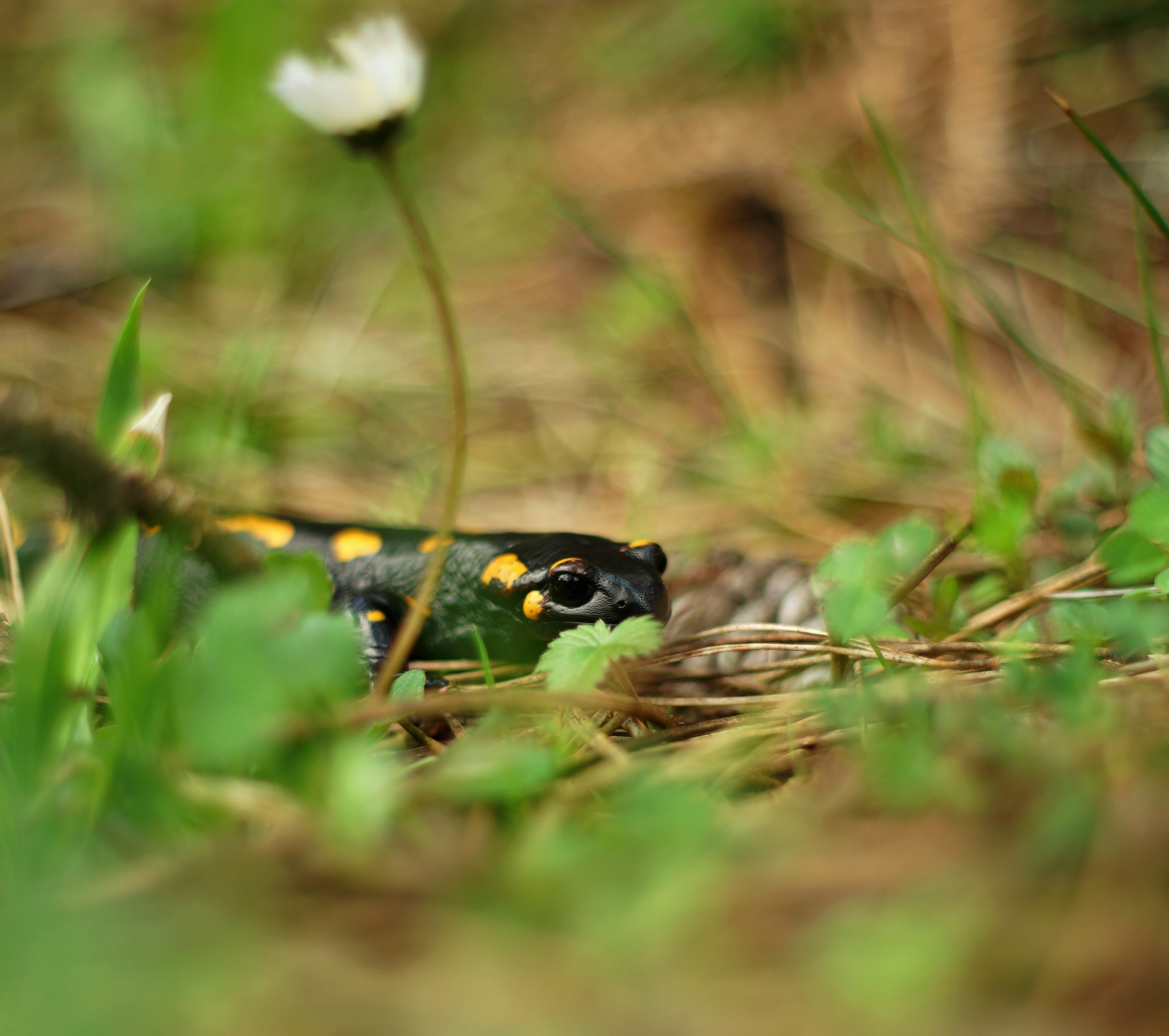
Fire salamander in Pindus National Park

The park was created in 1966 and considered one of the most important protected areas for the maintenance of mountainous biodiversity and ecosystem integrity at the national level. Forests of European black pine (Pinus nigra) and common beech (Fagus sylvatica) cover the park's lower and middle altitudes 1,000 to 1,600 m (3,300 to 5,200 ft), with several of these trees being more than 700 years old. At higher altitudes 1,600 to 1,900 m (5,200 to 6,200 ft), Bosnian pine (Pinus heldreichii) woodland is dominant, while at the greatest heights 1,900 to 2,177 m (6,234 to 7,142 ft), only certain types of bushes are found in the treeless alpine meadows. Additionally, the dry places and the lower parts of the valley are characterized by the domination of Buxus sempervirens, while some individuals of Abies borisii-regis are scattered among the Pinus nigra and Fagus sylvatica forests.

In total, 415 types of plants and 86 species of mushroom are recorded in the area. A number of local flower types are considered endemic to the Balkans, such as Dianthus deltoides and Allium breviradum. On the other hand, many endemic plants of central and northern Greece grow also in the park, like the Centaurea vlachorum. Moreover, rare species of the forests of Pindus mountains, typical of the lower geological layers, are Minuartia baldacci, Bornmuellera tymphaea, Campanula hawkinsiana, Viola dukadjinica and Silene pindicola. The most important places for the gathering of rare plants are the northern slopes of the peaks of Aftia, Flegga and Kapetan Kleidi. All the above places are very steep and difficult for grazing animals and therefore natural regeneration of the forest in this area is progressing normally and many rare plants are conserved. The serpentine soil, which is dominant in the area of the Pindus National Park also favors the growing of rare endemic plant species.

=== Fauna ===
The national park is one of three areas in Greece that hosts a population of Eurasian brown bears (Ursus arctos arctos), which is considered a conservation priority species. The region itself is also called "bear park". Other large mammals that live in the park are lynxes, roe deers and wildcats, with the last two being found in the area of Flegga forest. Additionally wolves, beech martens, wild boars and red squirrels are present in the area all year round. On the other hand, the Balkan chamois (Rupicapra rupicapra balcanica), a Balkan endemic species, is found on the steep and rocky parts of the park, as well as in areas with beech forests. Its population density fluctuates between 3-5 and even 20 individuals per 100 ha (250 acres) depending on the habitat productivity. The three small rivers crossing the area of the park have very clear water and are the well conserved habitat of the Eurasian otter.

In the area of the national park up to five types of bat have been reported, with most common being niktovatis (Nyctalus noctula). Moreover, it provides shelter for than 80 species of birds, such as 10 types of rare bird species including the eastern imperial eagle, golden eagle, Levant sparrowhawk and the lanner falcon, which indicates the ornithological importance of the area. One of the rare birds found in the park is the shore lark (Eremophilla alpestris), found in the alpine meadows, and the great grey shrike (Lanius excubitor), which migrates in the summer from Africa. The dense and mature forests of the area host eight types of woodpecker, including the white-backed, the middle spotted, the lesser spotted and the black woodpecker.

== Management ==
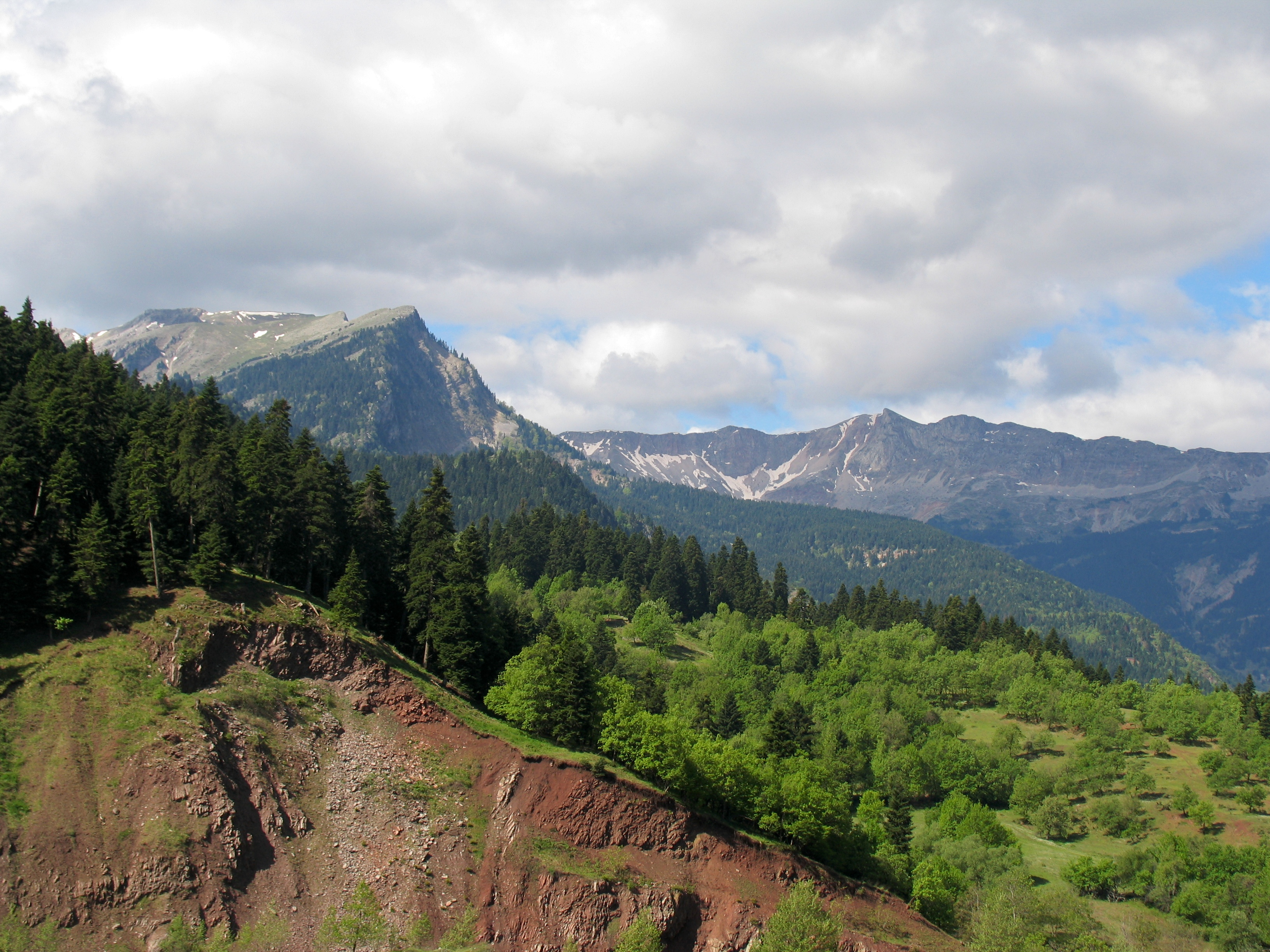
The mountains in Pindus National Park

Since 2003, the park is under the administrative authority of the 'Northern Pindus Management Body'. This authority is responsible for the ecological management of a much larger region that includes eight protected areas in Greece, also part of the Natura 2000, an initiative by the governments of the European Union that aims to protect the most seriously threatened habitats and species across Europe. The 'Northern Pindus Management Body', together with the local forest service, is responsible for regulating human activities and maintaining the ecological value of the protected area. However, until now this target remains elusive, because of a lack of expertise and of a science-based management plan. A great need therefore exists to conduct conservation-oriented research that can be translated directly into practical management proposals.

The core of the national park has been declared a 'biogenetic reserve' zone by the European Council with human activities such as woodcutting, grazing, hunting, fishing and access by car prohibited. In the park's buffer zone activities are also controlled in general. The most serious danger the park faced in the past were extensive fires caused by cattle breeders to create meadows for grazing. These fires have destroyed large parts of the Pinus nigra and P. heldreichii forests. However, since 1960, no fire has occurred due to improved protection measures by opening up many forest roads. Furthermore, an observation post was established near Avgo peak. A potential threat for the national park is a state initiative to divert the Arkoudorema river for the construction of a hydroelectric power plant. This initiative will have a negative impact on the park since a great part of the existing forest area will be covered by water, resulting in the reduction of the core zone. Another danger is the high grazing pressure in the core area, while a number of small coal-producing units at the outskirts of the park have raised a lot of concern.

== Recreation ==
Pindus National Park is considered as one of the least visited and least known national parks in Europe and it is not signposted from the main roads of the region. The area offers opportunities for hiking with its dirt roads being in good condition except in winter. The park can be best accessed from north, from the village of Perivoli, while there is also a track from the west side, near Milia. A climbing resort lies near Mavrovouni peak, at a height of 1,950 metres (6,400 ft), which is an ideal base for excursions to the park's area. According to the local legislation, the collection of any kind of organism is not allowed, while camping and staying in the park's core after the setting of the sun is prohibited. Additional restrictions include the lighting of fires, while activities such as kayaking and rafting need a special clearance from the local forestry.

== Sources ==
- Gibbons, Bob (2003). Greece: Nature Guides. Oxford University Press. pp. 42–44. ISBN 978-0-19-850437-5.
- Kati, Vassiliki; Dimopoulos Panayotis; Papaioannou Haritakis; Poirazidis Kostas (2009). "Ecological management of a Mediterranean mountainous reserve (Pindos National Park, Greece) using the bird community as an indicator". Journal for Nature Conservation. 17 (1): 47–59. Bibcode:2009JNatC..17...47K. doi:10.1016/j.jnc.2008.12.002.
- Tsunis, Gregory L. (1988). "The Valia-Kalda National Park, Greece". Fauna and Flora International. 22: 25–29. doi:10.1017/S0030605300027356.
- "Natura 2000 Data Form. Site code: GR1310002" (PDF). NATURA 2000. 2009. Archived from the original (PDF) on 2011-07-16.
