= Rapsista =

Rapsista (Greek: Ραψίστα) may refer to:

- Rapsista, Ioannina
- Rapsista, Thessaly
