= Lygos (disambiguation) =

Lygos, also spelled Ligos, is one of the ancient names of Constantinople.

It may also refer to:

- Lygkos, a mountain range in Greece
- An obsolete name for the botanical genus Retama
