= Aetorrachi =

Aetorrachi may refer to several places in Greece:

- Aetorrachi, Arcadia, a village in Arcadia, part of the municipal unit Tropaia
- Aetorrachi, Larissa, a village in the Larissa regional unit, part of the municipal unit Elassona
- Aetorrachi, Elis, a village in Elis, part of the municipal unit Vouprasia
- Aetorrachi, Ioannina, a village in the Ioannina regional unit, part of the municipal unit Katsanochoria
