= Platanoussa =

Platanoussa Πλατανούσσα
- Community
- Location within Greece
- Coordinates: 39°25′N 21°0.6′E
- Country: Greece
- Administrative region: Epirus
- Regional unit: Ioannina
- Municipality: North Tzoumerka
- Municipal unit: Katsanochoria

Area
  - Community: 16.35 km^{2} (6.31 sq mi)
- Elevation: 460 m (1,510 ft)

Population (2021)
  - Community: 379
  - Density: 23.2/km^{2} (60.0/sq mi)
- Time zone: UTC+2 (EET)
  - Summer (DST): UTC+3 (EEST)
- Vehicle registration: ΙΝ

Platanoussa (Greek: Πλατανούσσα, before 1927: Ραψίστα - Rapsista) is a village and a community in the municipal unit of Katsanochoria, Ioannina regional unit, Epirus, Greece. The community consists of the villages Platanoussa, Dafni and Zoodochos Pigi. Platanoussa is situated on the eastern slope of the Xerovouni mountain, above the right bank of the river Arachthos, at about 460 m above sea level. It is 8 km northeast of Anogeio, 29 km north of Arta and 31 km southeast of Ioannina.

== Population ==
Year	Village population	Community population
1981	-	590
1991	412	-
2001	363	460
2011	371	463
2021	301	379

== See also ==
- List of settlements in the Ioannina regional unit
