= Dimitris Dragatakis =

- Born: 22 January 1914; Platanoussa, Epirus
- Died: 18 December 2001 (aged 87); Athens, Greece
- Resting place: First Cemetery of Athens
- Education: Greek National Conservatoire
- Known for: Composition
- Style: Greek art music
- Spouse: Iro Dragataki
- Website: dimitrisdragatakis.com

Dimitris Dragatakis (Greek: Δημήτρης Δραγατάκης; 22 January 1914 – 18 December 2001) was a Greek composer of classical music and Greek art music.

He was born in Platanoussa, Epirus in 1914 and studied the violin from 1930 to 1939 at the Greek National Conservatory in Athens. Later on, he switched to the viola and from 1949 started composition lessons with Leonidas Zoras and Manolis Kalomiris, receiving his diploma in 1955.

He is considered one of Greece's most important modern composers, with a personal musical idiom that is both mature and laconic. Influenced by the musical traditions of Greece (in particular the ones of his native Epirus) and ancient Greek drama, his music also came to reflect his interest in new techniques such as free atonality, novel instrumental combinations, post-modernism, minimalism and electronic music.

He won a number of major prizes, including the Maria Callas award from the Hellenic Broadcasting Corporation in 1997 and the prestigious J. A. Papaioannou award from the Athens Academy in 1999.

He taught violin and later on theory at the Greek National Conservatory for twenty years, until he was appointed vice president of the conservatory in 1997.

He played for twenty years in the Greek National Opera as a violist and later served on the board of the Athens State Orchestra. He was vice president and honorary president of the Greek Composers Union.

He died in Athens aged 87.

== List of works ==
=== Chamber music for mixed ensembles ===
Sources:

- Afieroma (Dedication), variation on a theme by Manolis Kalomiris (1963)
- Diaphores (Differences) (1965)
- Mousiki gia treis (Music for three) (1969)
- Anadromes I (Retrospections I) (1976)
- Anadromes III (Retrospections III) (1978)
- Praktiko 19 (Practical 19) (1979)
- Trio (1986)
- Chorikou Scholion (Chorics commentary) (1993)
- Ar-Tho-Ta (Ar-Tho-Ta) (1996)
- Quartet No. 6 for violin, oboe, viola, and cello (1999)

=== Chamber music for strings ===
Sources:

- Nanourisma (Berceuse) (Indeterminate, estimated 1942-49)
- Choros (Dance) for Violin and Piano (Indeterminate, estimated 1949-57)
- Anamnisi (Remembrance) for Violin and Piano (1942)
- String Quartet No. 1 (1957)
- Sonata No. 1 for Violin and Piano (1958)
- String Quartet No. 2 (1958)
- Trio for two Violins and Viola (1960)
- String Quartet No. 3 (1960)
- Sonata No. 2 for Violin and Piano (1961)
- Suite for double string quartet (1961)
- Trio for Violin, Viola, and Cello (1965)
- Diafores (Differences) for Violin and Piano (1965)
- String Quartet No. 4 (1967)
- Liz-Va (Liz-Va) for two Guitars (1969)
- Duo for Violin and Piano (1971)
- String Quartet No. 5 (1974)
- Duo for Viola and Piano (1982)
- Duo for Violin and Guitar (1984)
- Sonata for Cello and Piano (1985)
- String Quartet No. 7 (2001)

=== Chamber music for winds and brass ===
Sources:

- Trio for Oboe, Clarinet in Bb, Bassoon (1962)
- Trio for Trumpet, Horn, Trombone (1962)
- Woodwind Quintet (1964)
- Epilogos (Epilogue) for Two trumpets, Horn, Trombone, Tuba (1970)
- Mousiki gia chalkina (Music for brass) for Trumpet, Horn, Trombone, Tuba (1971)
- Dialogoi (Dialogues) for two wind quartets (1974)
- Duo for Tuba and Clarinet in Bb (1977)
- Duo for Clarinet in Bb and Piano (1981)
- En Samo (In Samos) for Flute and Piano (1998)
- Nanourisma (Berceuse) for Alto Saxophone and Piano (2001)

=== Choral works ===
Sources:

- Erot’ anikite (Love invincible), Sophocles, Antigone, third stasimon (Indeterminate, estimated 1969)
- O choros (The chorus), Euripides, The Heracleidae, fourth stasimon (Indeterminate, estimated 1970)
- Taxidi (Journey), G.Kotzioulas (1980)
- Thalassino (Marine), D. Dragatakis (1980)
- I treli rodia (The crazy pomegranate tree), Od. Elytis (1981)
- Mana (Mother), V. Theodorou (1982)
- I lismonia (Forgetfulness), I. Dragataki (1986)
- T’ oneiro (The dream), Chr. Apostolatou (1986)
- Efchi tis manas (The mother’s wish), Iro Dragataki (1986)
- T’ oneiro tis manas (The mother’s dream), D. Dragatakis (1994)
- Ton vrachon touton (This rock), D. Kourouklis (1997)
- Agnoristi (Unrecognizable), D. Solomos (1997)
- To aeri (The breeze), Μ. Avlichos (1997)

=== Concertos ===
Sources:

- Concerto for Viola and Piano (Indeterminate, estimated 1949-57)
- Concertino for Clarinet and strings (1962)
- Concertino for Horn and instrumental ensemble (1965)
- Concerto for Violin and orchestra (1969)
- Adagio for Viola, string orchestra, and piano (1969)
- Concerto for Cello and orchestra (1972)
- Concerto for Oboe and strings (1973)
- Concerto for Piano and orchestra (1975–77)
- Concerto for Two Guitars and orchestra (1978)
- Concerto for Tuba and orchestra (1983)
- Concertino for Sandouri and orchestra (1988)
- Concerto for Viola and orchestra (1992)
- Concerto for Alto Saxophone and orchestra (1997)
- Nanourisma (Berceuse) for Alto Saxophone and strings (2001)

=== Dance/ballet works ===
Sources:

- Ballet Suite No. 1 (1963)
- Ballet Suite No. 2, Odysseas kai Nafsika (Ulysses and Nausicaa) (1964)
- Ballet Suite No. 3, Tou Koutrouli o gamos (The marriage of Koutroulis) (1964)
- Ballet Suite No. 4, Pinelopi i Anamoni (Penelope or awaiting) (1969)
- Ballet Suite No. 5, O choros tis Nafsikas (Nausicaa’s dance) (1970)

=== Electronic ===
Sources:

- Mythologias Ι (Mythology’s I) (1970)
- Mythologias II (Mythology’s II) (1970)
- Zalouch (Zalouch), T. Tolia (1971)

=== Orchestral works ===
- Treis Melodies (Three melodies) (Indeterminate, estimated 1949-57)
- Lyrika Skitsa (Lyric sketches) (1958)
- Dokimio (Essay) (1958)
- Symphony No. 1 (1959)
- Symphony No. 2 (1960)
- Symphony No. 3, Mikri (Little) (1964)
- Symphony No. 4 (1966)
- Tessera Skitsa (Four sketches) (1966–68)
- Strophes (Turns) (1970–72)
- Dromena (Actions) (1974)
- Symphony No. 5, O peri ton Acheronta mythos (The myth about Acheron) (1979–80)
- Mnimes (Memories) (1981–82)
- Symphony No. 6, To chreos (The duty) (1989)
- Spondes ston 21o aiona (Libations to the 21st century) (1998)
- Antirropa (Counterbalances), Three Preludes for Orchestra (1998)

=== Solo works ===
Sources:

- Petalouda (Papillon) for Piano (Indeterminate, estimated before 1940)
- Nostalgia (Nostalgia) for Piano (Indeterminate, estimated 1940)
- Mikri Balanta (Petite Ballade) for Piano (1949)
- Sonatina No. 1 for Piano (1961)
- Sonatina No. 2 for Piano (1963)
- Antikes (Antiques) for Piano (1972)
- Treis Omilies (Three speeches) for Flute (1973)
- Elegeio (Elegy) for Tuba (1974)
- Anadromes II (Retrospections II) for Piano (1977)
- Spoudi I (Etude I) for Piano (1981)
- Spoudi II (Etude II) for Piano (1981)
- Anadromes IV (Retrospections IV) for two pianos (two players, four hands) (1983)
- Antilogoi (Refute) for two pianos (four players, eight hands) (1988)
- Inelia (Inelia) for Piano (1997)
- Monologos ar. 2 (Monologue no .2) for Cello (2000)
- Monologos ar. 4 (Monologue no. 4) for Piano (2001)
- Monologos ar. 3 (Monologue no. 3) for Violin (2001)
- Kithara (Guitar) (2001)

=== Soundtrack recording and music for special occasions ===
Sources:

- Salpisma gia tin eisodo tou Olympiakou Fotos sto Stadio (Fanfare for the entry of the Olympic light into the stadium) (1969)
- Ymnos gia to Olympiako Fos (Anthem for the Olympic light), S. Sperantzas (1969)
- Ichos kai Fos (Sound and light), Jean Baelen (1972)
- Koutouki (Koutouki) (1972)

=== Theatre ===
Sources:

- Mideia (Medea), Euripides (1968)
- I epistrofi tou Odyssea (The Return of Ulysses), D. Siatopoulos (1968)
- Antigoni (Antigone), Sophocles (1969)
- Agamemnon (Agamemnon), T.Roussos (1969)
- Irakleidai (The Heracleidae), Euripides (1970)
- Ifigeneia en Tavrois (Iphigenia in Tauris), Euripides (1971)
- Mavrolykoi (Black-wolves), Μ. Skouloudis (1971)
- Ilektra (Electra), Sophocles (1973)
- Electra, G. Arkas (1973)

=== Vocal works ===
Sources:

- O tseligkas (The chief shepherd), K. Krystallis (Indeterminate, estimated 1942-49)
- Tachtarisma (Dandling song) [on traditional verses] (Indeterminate, estimated 1942-49)
- Tragoudi (Song), M. Veloudis (Indeterminate, estimated 1957-58)
- Ta prot’asteria (The first stars), F. Angoules (1961)
- Tsakizo tis lianes elies (Cracking the thin olives), V. Theodorou (1961)
- Poulia ein’ ta chronia (Years are like birds), F. Angoules (1961)
- I balanta tis Gkouentolin (Gwendolin’s ballad), J. Anouilh, Becket (1968)
- Anafora stin Ilektra (Reference to Electra), Τ. Roussos (1968)
- Ochi ta roda (Not the roses), G. Drosinis (1971)
- De thelo tou kissou (I don’t want the ivy’s [deceiving height]), G. Drosinis (1971)
- Me poia lachtara (With which longing), G. Drosinis (1971)
- Na se prosmeno (To await for you), G. Drosinis (1971)
- Echei apops’ ena fengari (There’s a moon tonight), K. Kontoulēs (1979)
- Monologos ar. 1 (Monologue no.1), D. Dragatakis (1979)
- Nanourisma (Lullaby), D. Dragatakis (1980)
- Dyo peristeria perasan (Two doves passed by), D. Dragatakis (1980)
- Vithleem (Bethlehem), D. Dragatakis (1980)
- I treli rodia (The crazy pomegranate tree), Od. Elytis (1981)
- Mana (Mother), V. Theodorou (1981)
- Isoun mikri (You were [a] young [girl]), V. Theodorou (1982)
- Piano nero (Holding water), V. Theodorou (1982)
- T’ Aprili to fengari (April’s moon), V. Theodorou (1982)
- Mythologias III (Mythology’s III), Euripides (1985)
- Odi XIII: Ta ifaisteia (Ode XIII: the volcanoes), Α. Kalvos (1992)
- Antitheseis: Katerina (Contrasts: Katherine), D. Dragatakis (1995)
- Mideias apoichoi (Medea’s reverberations), Euripides (1995)
- Enypnio (While Asleep), D. Dragatakis (2000)

=== Miscellaneous ===
Sources:

- Preloudio kai Fougka (Prelude and fugue) (Indeterminate, estimated 1952-55)
- Fougka Exetaseon (Examination fugue), variation on a theme by Manolis Kalomiris (1955)
- Ymnos gia to Panepistimio Thessalonikis (Anthem for Thessaloniki’s University) (Indeterminate, estimated 1955)
- Anthem for the Olympic Light (1969)
- Ifigeneia en Avlidi (Iphigenia in Avlidi), Euripides (Indeterminate, estimated 1975)
- Anadromes V (Retrospections V) (1979-1999)
- Ornis Alkyon (Bird Alcyon), Euripides, Iphigenia in Tauris, second stasimon (Indeterminate, estimated 1998-2001)
- En Samo (In Samos) (2005)

=== Incomplete ===
Sources:

- Symphony No. 7 (Indeterminate, estimated 1992-2001)
- Itan mia fora (There was once), V. Goula (Indeterminate, estimated 2000-2001)

== Discography ==
- Dimitris Dragatakis: The String Quartets (Irida Classical: IRIDA 022)
- Dragatakis: Piano Works (complete) (Naxos 8.570789)
- Dimitris Dragatakis: Chamber Music I (Irida Classical: IRIDA 001)
- Ballades for saxophone and orchestra (along with works by Tomasi, Ravel, Piazzola and Iturralde) (Naxos 8.557454)
