= Xerovouni =

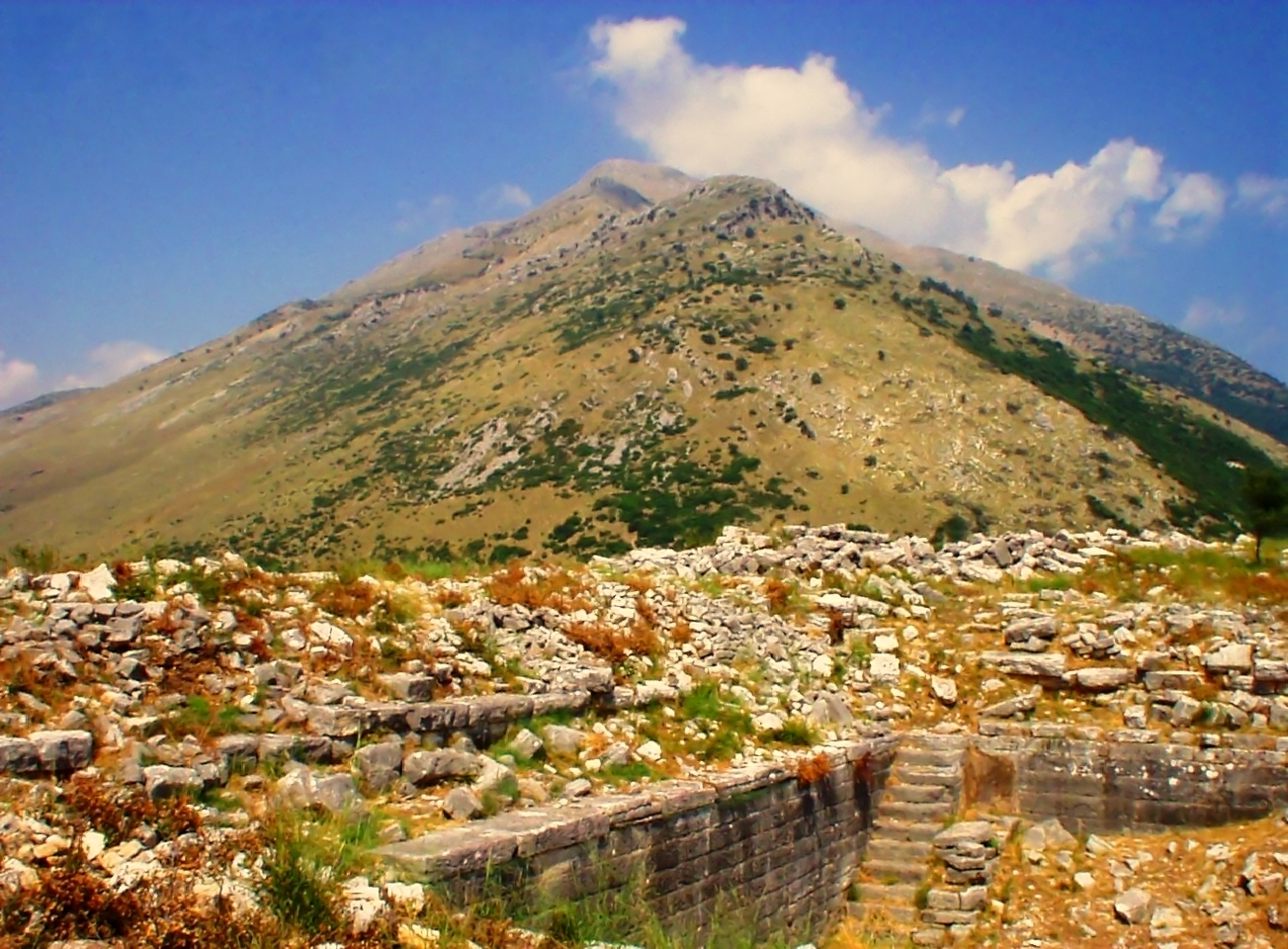

Highest point
- Elevation: 1,650 m (5,410 ft)
- Prominence: 1,029 m (3,376 ft)
- Listing: List of mountains in Greece, Ribu
- Coordinates: 39°23′38″N 20°59′31″E

Naming
- Pronunciation: Greek: [kseroˈvuni]

Geography
- Location within Greece
- Location: southcentral Epirus

Xerovouni (Greek: Ξεροβούνι, also Ξηροβούνι Xirovouni) is a mountain in the southern part of the Epirus region, Greece. It covers the northeastern Preveza, the southern Ioannina and the northwestern Arta regional units. Its maximum elevation is 1,614 m. It is drained by the river Arachthos to the east and by the river Louros to the west. The nearest mountains are the Tomaros to the northwest and the Athamanika to the northeast. There are forests in the lower areas, the highest areas consist of dry grasslands.

The municipal unit Xirovouni, on the southeast side of the mountain, was named after the mountain. The nearest villages are Dafnoti to the east, Platanoussa to the northeast, Sklivani to the northwest and Anogeio to the southwest.
