= Katsikas =

Katsikas Κατσικάς
- Community
- Location within Greece
- Coordinates: 39°37′N 20°53′E
- Country: Greece
- Administrative region: Epirus
- Regional unit: Ioannina
- Municipality: Ioannina
- Municipal unit: Pamvotida

Population (2021)
  - Community: 5,180
- Time zone: UTC+2 (EET)
  - Summer (DST): UTC+3 (EEST)

Katsikas (Greek: Κατσικάς) is the largest village of the municipal unit Pamvotida, in the Ioannina regional unit, Epirus, northern Greece. Since the 2011 local government reform it is part of the municipality Ioannina. Its population is 5,180 (2021).
