= Patero =

Patero may refer to:

- Patero, Greece, a village in Fortosi, Greece
- Joseph D. Patero (1932–2020), American politician

== See also ==
- Pateros, Philippines
- Pateros, Washington, U.S.
