= Theriakisi =

Theriakisi (Greek: Θεριακήσι) may refer to several places in Greece:

- Theriakisi, Aetolia-Acarnania, a village in Aetolia-Acarnania
- Theriakisi, Ioannina, a village in the Ioannina regional unit
