= Pavlos Vrellis Greek History Museum =

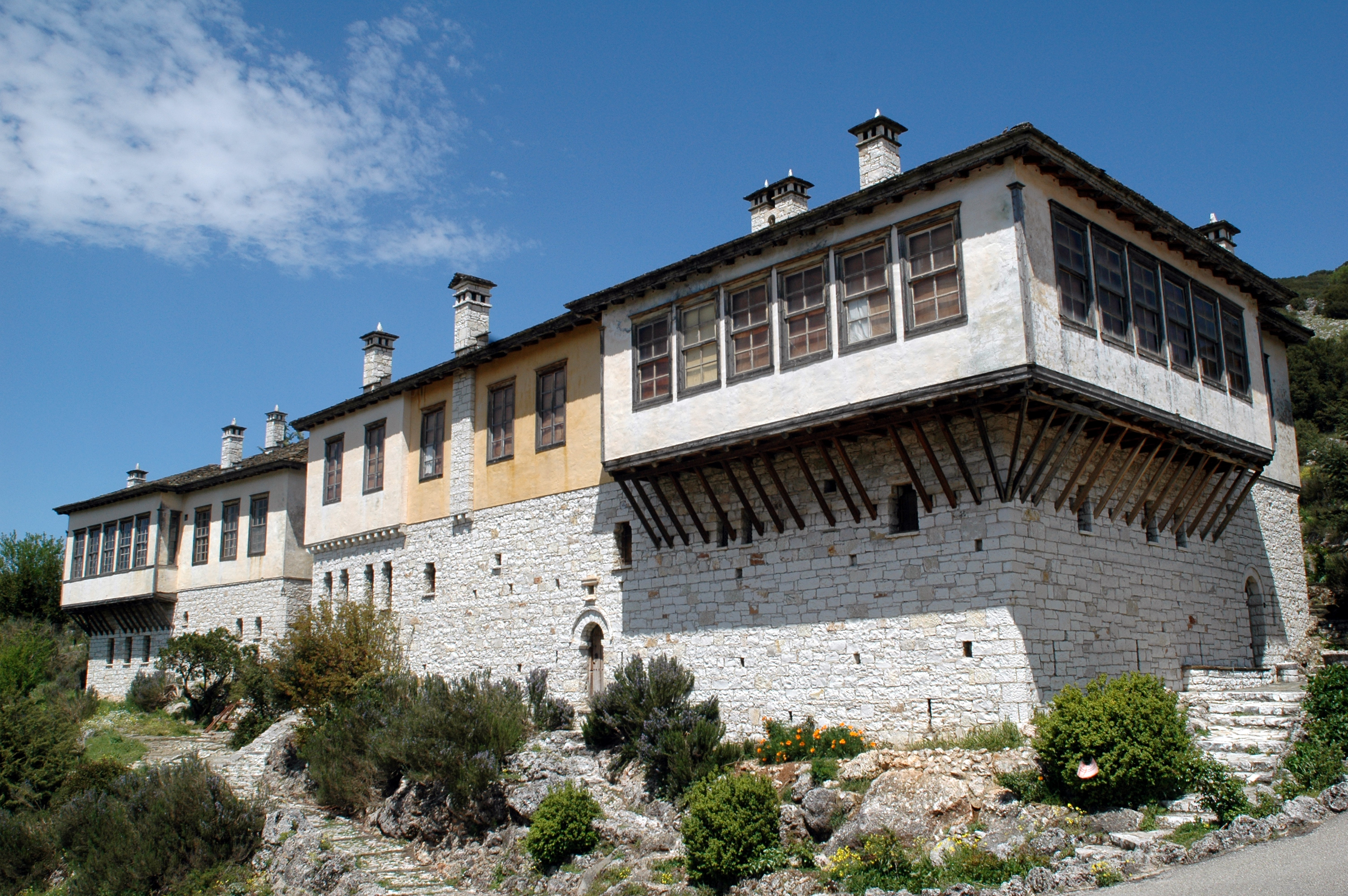
- Location: (Greece) Bizani (Ioannina regional unit)
- Coordinates: 39.3318°N 20.5222°E
- Type: Wax museum
- Website: http://www.vrellis.org/

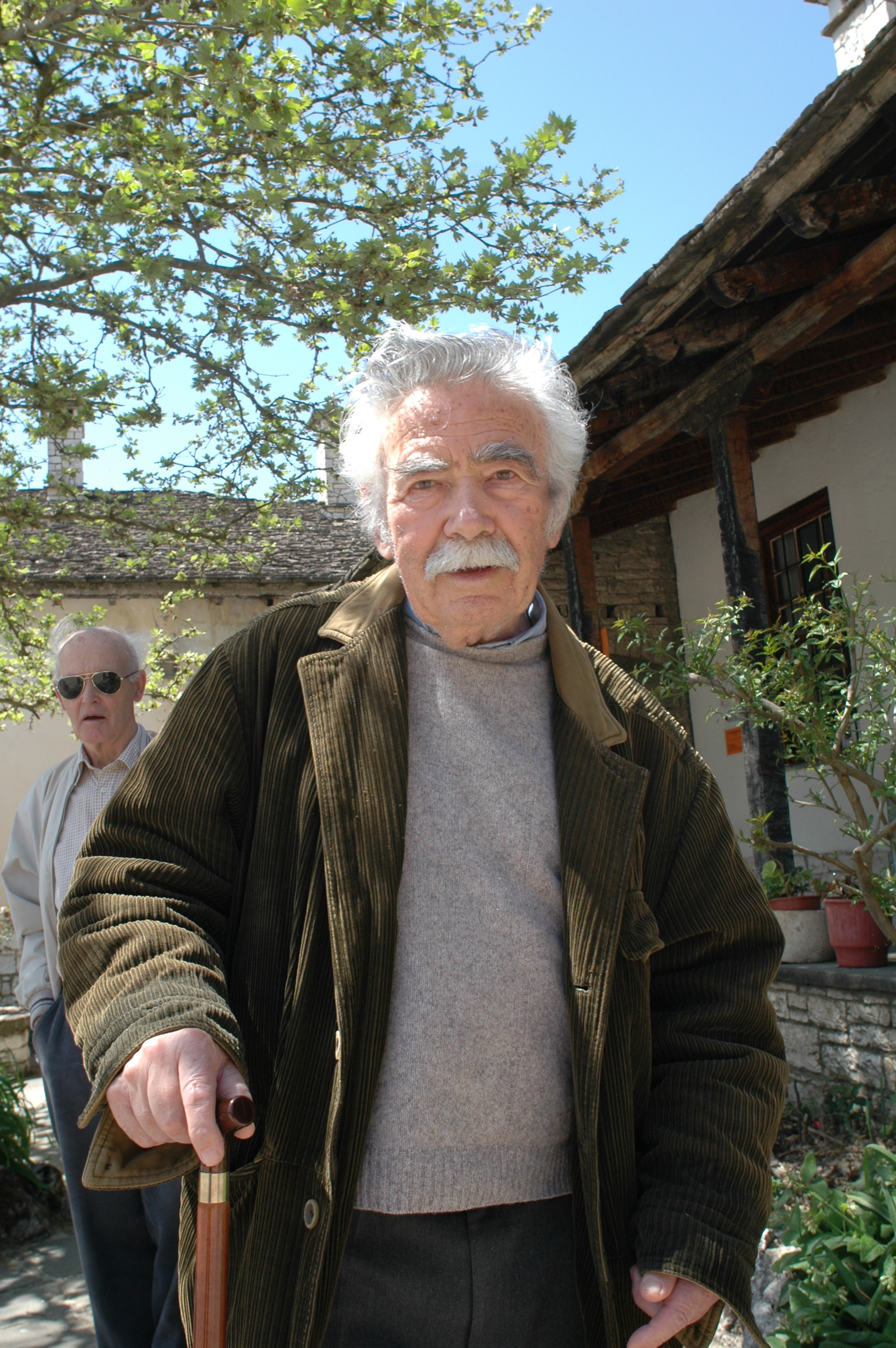
Pavlos Vrellis

The Pavlos Vrellis Greek History Museum (Greek: Μουσείο Ελληνικής Ιστορίας Παύλου Βρέλλη) also known as Pavlos Vrellis Museum of Wax Effigies is a privately owned wax museum in Ioannina regional unit, Greece. It was set up by the sculptor Pavlos Vrellis in February 1983, and is the best known wax museum in Greece. The museum hosts 150 wax models in 37 themes, inspired by various events from Greek history.

== Location and history ==
The Museum's main building is located 14 km (9 mi) south of the city of Ioannina, Epirus, in Bizani municipality, on the Ioannina – Athens national road. It was owned by local sculptor Pavlos Vrellis, who founded the museum in February 1983. The museum facility covers an area of 2,500 m^{2} (2,990 sq yd) and is built according to the traditional, local, fortress-type architectural style of 18th-century, according to Vrellis' own design.

A small annex with free access is located at Ioannina, 15 Karamanli street.

== Exhibits ==
The wax effigies of the museum are displayed in life size, included in a faithful representation of the environment of their age and revive forms of the local history. Without storeys but on a variety of distinct parallel and connecting levels. The visitor moves along mountains, houses, caves, churches, and alleys, following a non-circular but endless course, ingeniously devised and arranged.

They cover twenty four centuries of Greek history (from 500 BC), with an emphasis on the modern history of Epirus. The museum hosts 37 themes and 150 wax models which represent various historical events. There are three thematic units in the Museum: pre 1821 history, Greek War of Independence (1821-1830) and themes from World War II:

- Secret Greek School during Ottoman rule.
- Foundation of Filiki Eteria
- Torture of Dionysius the Philosopher
- Klephts
- Death of Ali Pasha
- Theodoros Kolokotronis
- Women of Pindus (during the Battle of Pindus)

Moreover, specific themes are inspired from Jewish history, like images from The Holocaust
