= Tomaros =

Mountain in Greece

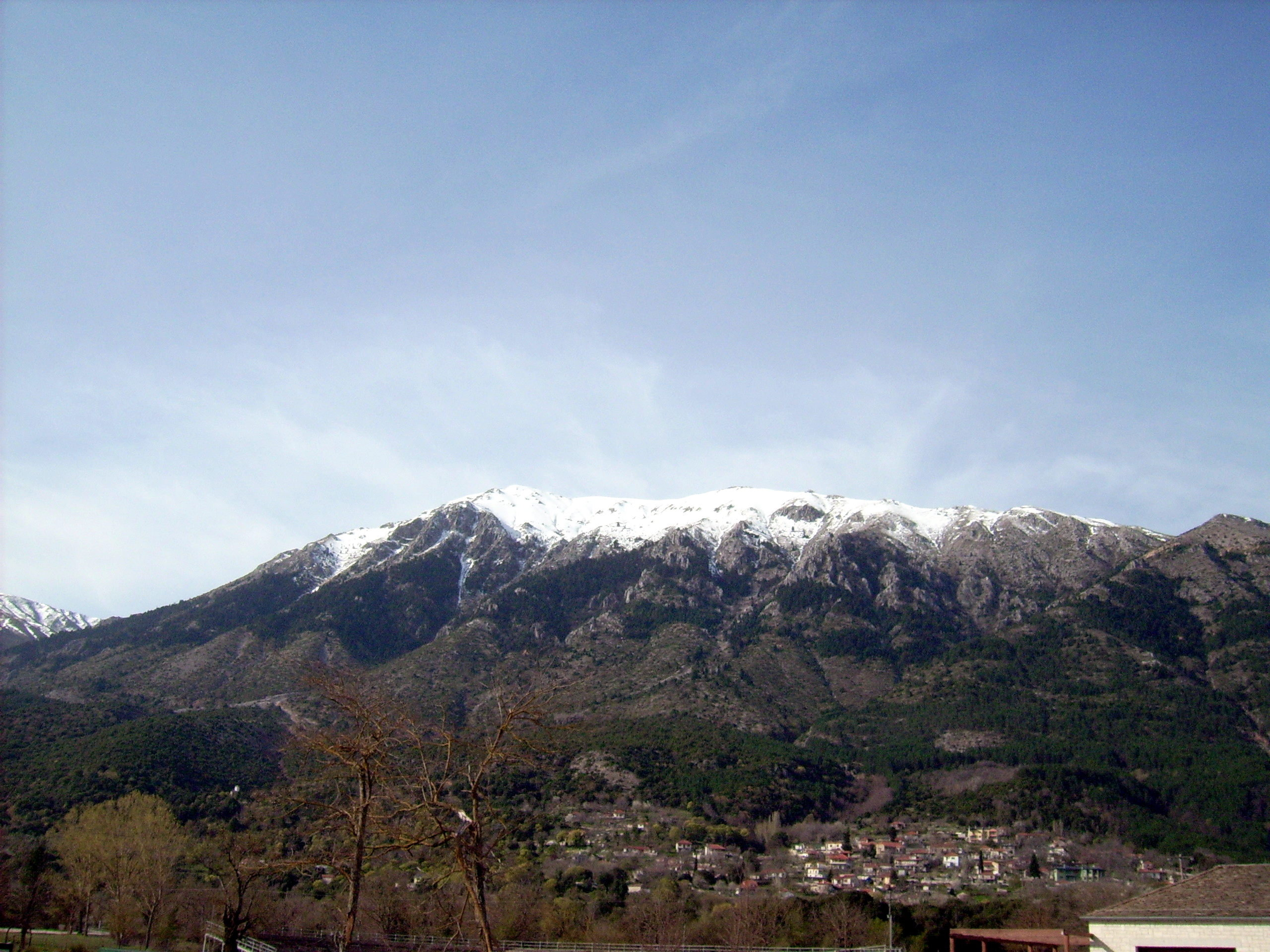

Highest point
- Elevation: 1,974 m (6,476 ft)
- Listing: List of mountains in Greece
- Coordinates: 39°29′17″N 20°47′28″E

Naming
- Pronunciation: Greek: [ˈtomaros]

Geography
- Location within Greece
- Location: central Epirus, Greece

Tomaros (Greek: Τόμαρος, also Ολύτσικας - Olytsikas or Tmaros) is a mountain in southwestern Ioannina regional unit, Greece. Rising to the south of the archaeological site of Dodona, it is part of the Pindus mountain range. Its maximum elevation is 1,974 m. The nearest mountains are the Xerovouni to the southeast and the Souli Mountains to the southwest. There are forests in the lower areas, the highest areas consist of dry grasslands.

The nearest villages are Vargiades to the southeast, Lippa to the southwest and Dodoni to the north. The A2 motorway (Egnatia Odos, Igoumenitsa - Ioannina -Kozani - Thessaloniki - Alexandroupoli) passes northwest of the mountain with tunnels.

== Etymology ==
Two suggestions have been proposed.

Related to Greek temno cut + oros mountain (sharp mountain) PIE *tom-/*tem- "cut", Vale of Tempe, Tomi city, Tomouroi priests of Dodona (wood-cutters) or chastified (with cutten tail, line oura) or tomarion diminutive of tomos slice, piece of land, tome, volume.

Related to Tmor and Tomori mountains in Illyria and Illyrian eponym Temus. A proposed Illyrian word for "dark", PIE *temes akin to Latin tenebrae "darkness", temere "blindly, by chance", Sanskrit tamas (तमस्) "darkness", Russian tyomnaya (тёмная) "dark", Old Irish temel "darkness", Middle Irish teimen "dark grey", Old High German demar "darkness", dinstar "dark", Old Church Slavonic tǐma "darkness", tǐmǐnǔ "dark", etc
