= Pramanta =

Pramanta Πράμαντα
- Municipal unit
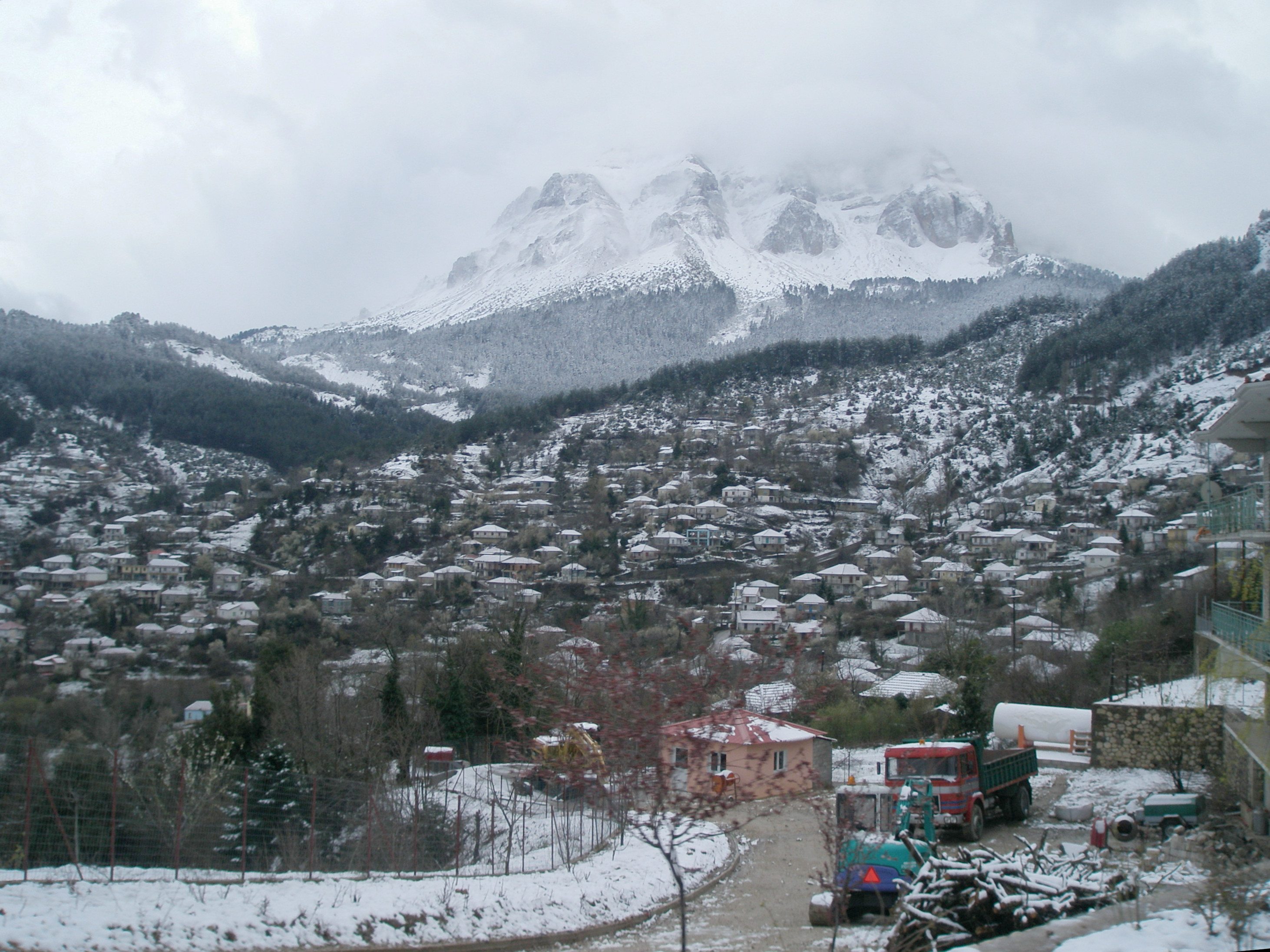
- Winter view, with Mt Athamanika in the background

- Location within the regional unit

- Location within Greece
- Coordinates: 39°31′N 21°06′E
- Country: Greece
- Administrative region: Epirus
- Regional unit: Ioannina
- Municipality: North Tzoumerka

Area
  - Municipal unit: 69.058 km^{2} (26.663 sq mi)
  - Community: 39.435 km^{2} (15.226 sq mi)

Population (2021)
  - Municipal unit: 1,759
  - Municipal unit density: 25.47/km^{2} (65.97/sq mi)
  - Community: 1,514
  - Community density: 38.39/km^{2} (99.44/sq mi)
- Time zone: UTC+2 (EET)
  - Summer (DST): UTC+3 (EEST)
- Vehicle registration: ΙΝ

Pramanta (Greek: Πράμαντα) is a village and a former municipality in the Ioannina regional unit, Epirus, in northwestern Greece. Since the 2011 local government reform, it is part of the municipality North Tzoumerka, of which it is a municipal unit. In 2021 its population was 1,514 for the community and 1,759 for the municipal unit. The municipal unit has an area of 69.058 km^{2} and the community 39.435 km^{2}. Pramanta is situated in the Athamanika mountains, at about 840m elevation. It is 4 km west of Melissourgoi, 6 km north of Agnanta, 6 km south of Prosilio, 65 km southeast of Ioannina, 70 km northeast of Arta and 28 km south of Metsovo.

== Subdivisions ==
The municipal unit Pramanta is subdivided into the following communities (constituent villages in brackets):

- Ampelochori
- Pramanta (Pramanta, Tsopela, Christoi)
- Raftanaioi (Raftanaioi, Vounoreia, Zalouchos, Megali Rachi, Mylokopeio, Palaiomochousti, Pallikari, Plaka, Rouga, Fraxos)

== Population ==
Year	Village population	Community population	Municipal unit population
1981	-	1,585	-
1991	1,090	1,708	-
2001	1,422	1,845	2,194
2011	1,137	1,527	1,774
2021	1,214	1,514	1,759

== Attractions ==
In the central square one can view the known perennial plane tree, the historic fountain called "Arapis" and the central church of the village, Agia Paraskevi. Close to Pramanta is the "Anemotrypa" cave with its underground river, the 13th century Kipina Monastery built into a rocky mountain, and the mountain retreat in "Isioma".
