= Pamvotida =

Pamvotida Παμβώτιδα
- Municipal unit
- Location within the regional unit

- Location within Greece
- Coordinates: 39°37′N 20°54′E
- Country: Greece
- Administrative region: Epirus
- Regional unit: Ioannina
- Municipality: Ioannina

Area
  - Municipal unit: 138.616 km^{2} (53.520 sq mi)

Population (2021)
  - Municipal unit: 10,963
  - Municipal unit density: 79.089/km^{2} (204.84/sq mi)
- Time zone: UTC+2 (EET)
  - Summer (DST): UTC+3 (EEST)
- Vehicle registration: ΙΝ

Pamvotida (Greek: Παμβώτιδα) is a former municipality in the Ioannina regional unit, Epirus, Greece. Since the 2011 local government reform it is part of the municipality Ioannina, of which it is a municipal unit. It is named after the Lake of Ioannina, which is also known as Pamvotida. The municipal unit has an area of 138.616 km^{2}. Population 10,963 (2021). The seat of the municipality was in Katsikas.
