= Matsouki =

Matsouki Ματσούκι (Greek) Matsutsli, Matsusli (Aromanian)
- Municipal unit
- Location within the regional unit

- Location within Greece
- Coordinates: 39°34′N 21°10′E
- Country: Greece
- Administrative region: Epirus
- Regional unit: Ioannina
- Municipality: North Tzoumerka

Area
  - Municipal unit: 35.360 km^{2} (13.653 sq mi)

Population (2021)
  - Municipal unit: 274
  - Municipal unit density: 7.75/km^{2} (20.1/sq mi)
- Time zone: UTC+2 (EET)
  - Summer (DST): UTC+3 (EEST)
- Vehicle registration: ΙΝ

Matsouki (Greek: Ματσούκι, Aromanian: Matsutsli, Matsusli) is a village and a former community in the Ioannina regional unit, Epirus, Greece. Since the 2011 local government reform it is part of the municipality North Tzoumerka, of which it is a municipal unit. The municipal unit has an area of 35.360 km^{2}. Population 274 (2021).

== Name ==
Local tradition derived the placename from the villagers gouging the eye of a terrifying giant on the opposite mountain with a matsouki 'club', or alternatively, from when they used matsoukia 'clubs' to drive away the Ottomans who came to plunder the village. The toponym is derived from the word matsouki, meaning a 'stick, club'. The term matsouka is found in Medieval Greek and borrowed from the Venetian mazzoca. In Aromanian, the forms of the word are măčĭucă and mațucă, in Romanian maciucă and in Albanian macuk/ë, -a, all meaning 'shepherd’s staff'. In relation to the village, matsouki is used as a collective singular to figuratively refer to the many livestock breeders of the area. It can be compared to the famous local pseudo-doctor nicknamed Matsoukas, from matsouka 'shepherd's rod'; who inspired the local phrase 'Matsoukas went from tending goats to becoming a doctor'.

The linguist Kostas Oikonomou wrote that this collective singular usage is supported by the Aromanian form of the toponym, Matsouts/-li, derived from măčĭuțe, the plural form of the Aromanian noun măčĭucă. Oikonomou stated a derivation from the surname Matsoukis cannot be ruled out through its alteration into a neuter form to match the grammatical gender of words like village, estate and so on. The surname Matsoukis was formed in the same way as the personal name Matsoukas mentioned above.

== Demographics ==
Matsouki has an Aromanian population and is an Aromanian speaking village. In the early 21st century, elderly people were bilingual in the community language and Greek, whereas younger residents under 40 might have understood the community language but did not use it.
