= Tzoumerka =

Tzoumerka Τζουμέρκα
- Municipal unit
- Location within the regional unit

- Location within Greece
- Coordinates: 39°50′N 21°07′E
- Country: Greece
- Administrative region: Epirus
- Regional unit: Ioannina
- Municipality: North Tzoumerka

Area
  - Municipal unit: 71.10 km^{2} (27.45 sq mi)

Population (2021)
  - Municipal unit: 717
  - Municipal unit density: 10.1/km^{2} (26.1/sq mi)
- Time zone: UTC+2 (EET)
  - Summer (DST): UTC+3 (EEST)
- Vehicle registration: ΙΝ

Tzoumerka (Greek: Τζουμέρκα) is a former municipality in the Ioannina regional unit, Epirus, Greece. Since the 2011 local government reform it is part of the municipality North Tzoumerka, of which it is a municipal unit. The municipal unit has an area of 71.10 km^{2}. Population 717 (2021). The seat of the municipality was in Chouliarades.

== History ==
During the Axis occupation of Greece (1941–1944) the main base of the EDES resistance organization was found in the Tzoumerka mountain.
