= Kalarrytes =

Village in Epirus, Greece

Kalarites Καλαρρύτες (Greek) Cãlarli (Aromanian)
- Municipal unit
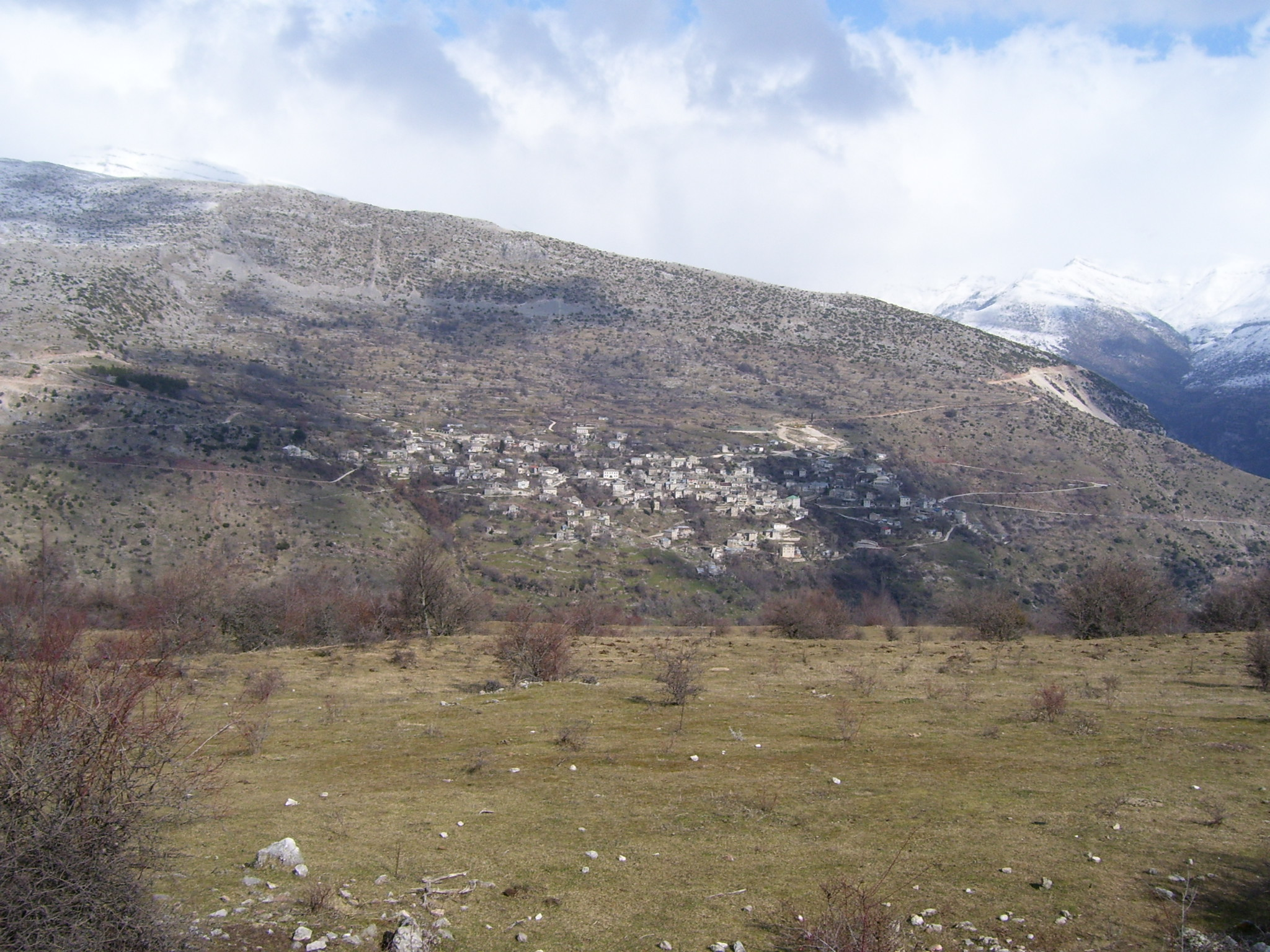
- Kalarrytes

- Location within the regional unit

- Location within Greece
- Coordinates: 39°35′N 21°07′E
- Country: Greece
- Administrative region: Epirus
- Regional unit: Ioannina
- Municipality: North Tzoumerka

Area
  - Municipal unit: 39.959 km^{2} (15.428 sq mi)
- Elevation: 1,170 m (3,840 ft)

Population (2021)
  - Municipal unit: 236
  - Municipal unit density: 5.91/km^{2} (15.3/sq mi)
- Time zone: UTC+2 (EET)
  - Summer (DST): UTC+3 (EEST)
- Vehicle registration: ΙΝ

Kalarrytes (Greek: Καλαρρύτες, Aromanian: Cãlarli) is a village and a former community in the Ioannina regional unit, Epirus, Greece. Since the 2011 local government reform it is part of the municipality North Tzoumerka, of which it is a municipal unit. The municipal unit has an area of 39.959 km^{2}. The population in 2021 was 236. The community consists of the villages Kalarrytes and Mystras.

== Name ==
The toponym has two possible derivations. The first originated from the placename Kalari, itself from the surname Kalaris through a morphological transformation stemming from the Aromanian word călár 'horseman', and is combined with the suffix -itis. The second arose from the Aromanian toponym Călár and the Aromanian suffix of Greek origin -it.

The linguists Konstantinos Nikolaidis (1909) and Tache Papahagi (1974) derived the word călár from the Latin caballarius. The linguist Kostas Oikonomou wrote that the word is more likely derived from the Aromanian cal 'horse' and the profession-denoting suffix -ar found in other Aromanian words reflecting livestock professions. Oikonomou also stated that a connection between Kalarrytes and the toponym Kalavryta, or the linking of both names to the Slavic word kolovьrtъ 'spinning wheel', as proposed by the linguist Phaedon Malingoudis, is less likely. In Greek, other variations of the toponym include Kalarrytai (-es), Kalarriti, and Kalaryta.

== Climate ==
Kalarrytes has a temperate oceanic climate (Köppen climate classification: Cfb), bordering on a warm-summer mediterranean climate (Köppen climate classification: Csb). Kalarites experiences cool, rainy winters and warm, drier summers.

Climate data for Kalarites
Month	Jan	Feb	Mar	Apr	May	Jun	Jul	Aug	Sep	Oct	Nov	Dec	Year
Mean daily maximum °C (°F)	4.8 (40.6)	6.33 (43.39)	9.82 (49.68)	13.13 (55.63)	19.21 (66.58)	23.82 (74.88)	26.72 (80.10)	26.36 (79.45)	23.55 (74.39)	16.99 (62.58)	10.35 (50.63)	5.95 (42.71)	15.59 (60.05)
Daily mean °C (°F)	1.72 (35.10)	2.55 (36.59)	5.01 (41.02)	9.08 (48.34)	14.43 (57.97)	19.08 (66.34)	21.42 (70.56)	20.76 (69.37)	17.65 (63.77)	11.26 (52.27)	5.48 (41.86)	2.32 (36.18)	10.90 (51.61)
Mean daily minimum °C (°F)	−0.96 (30.27)	0.38 (32.68)	2.07 (35.73)	4.70 (40.46)	7.98 (46.36)	11.44 (52.59)	14.38 (57.88)	14.11 (57.40)	9.65 (49.37)	7.08 (44.74)	1.6 (34.9)	−1.06 (30.09)	5.95 (42.71)
Average rainfall mm (inches)	151.27 (5.96)	158.96 (6.26)	134.41 (5.29)	130.18 (5.13)	116.89 (4.60)	47.31 (1.86)	38.28 (1.51)	49.51 (1.95)	80.27 (3.16)	125.57 (4.94)	238.58 (9.39)	221.68 (8.73)	1,492.91 (58.78)
Mean monthly sunshine hours	96.6	121.06	136.03	155.13	195.3	264.04	301.09	268.78	200.93	156.89	86.44	68.79	2,051.08
Source: Hellenic National Meteorological Service

== Demographics ==
Kalariti has an Aromanian population and is an Aromanian speaking village. In the early 21st century, elderly people were bilingual in the community language and Greek, whereas younger residents under 40 might have understood the community language but did not use it.

== Notable people ==
Sotirios Voulgaris (1857–1932), founder of the Bulgari fashion house
