= Vovousa =

Vovousa Βοβούσα, Βωβούσα Bãiasa
- Municipal unit
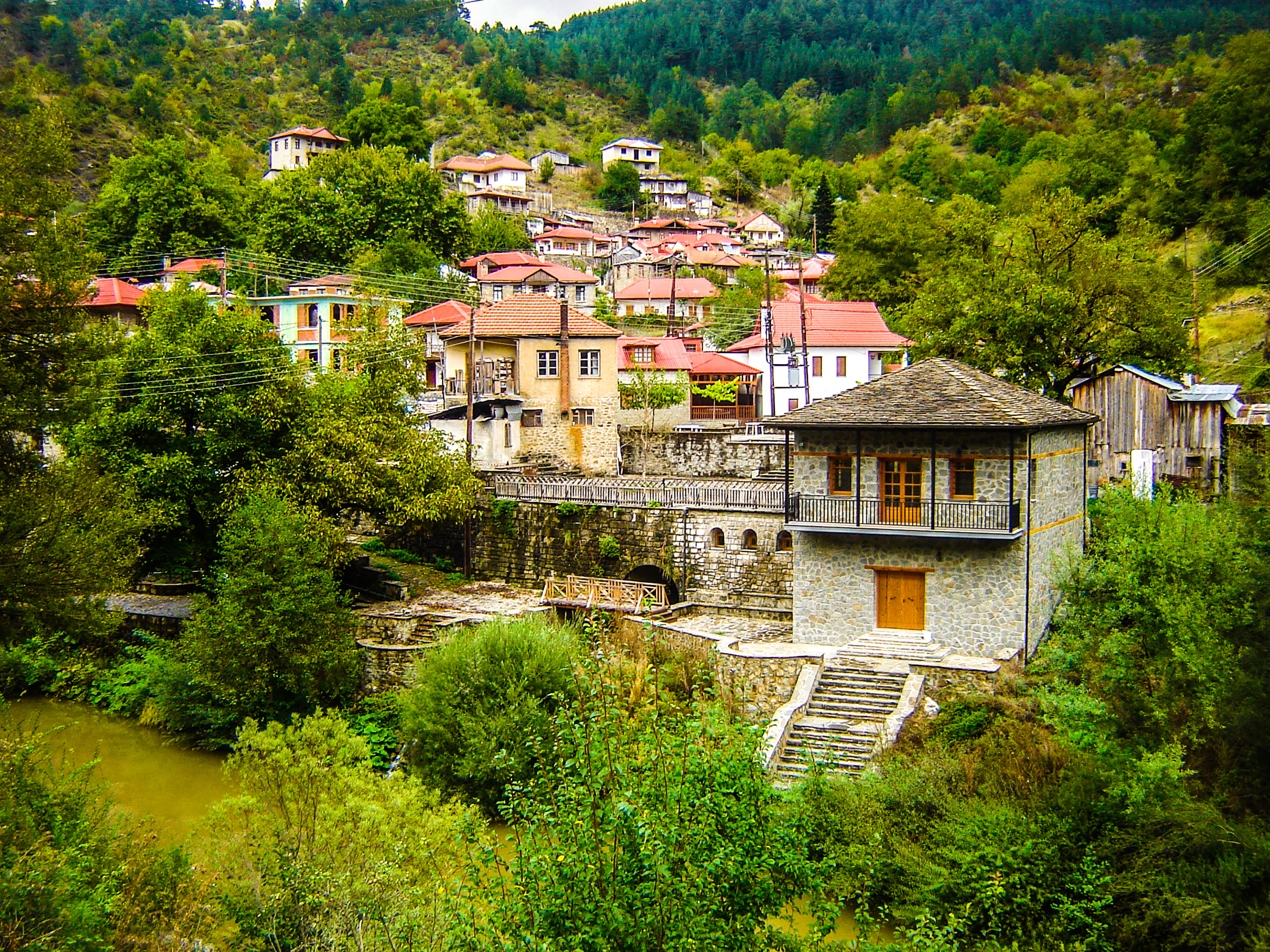
- View of Vovousa

- Location within the regional unit

- Location within Greece
- Coordinates: 39°56′N 21°03′E
- Country: Greece
- Administrative region: Epirus
- Regional unit: Ioannina
- Municipality: Zagori

Area
  - Municipal unit: 51.029 km^{2} (19.702 sq mi)

Population (2021)
  - Municipal unit: 132
  - Municipal unit density: 2.59/km^{2} (6.70/sq mi)
- Time zone: UTC+2 (EET)
  - Summer (DST): UTC+3 (EEST)
- Vehicle registration: ΙΝ

Vovousa (Greek: Βοβούσα or Βωβούσα; Aromanian: Bãiasa) is a village and a former community in the Ioannina regional unit, Epirus, Greece. Since the 2011 local government reform it is part of the municipality Zagori, of which it is a municipal unit. The municipal unit has an area of 51.029 km^{2}. It is one of the original Zagori villages. Population 132 (2021).

== Name ==
The names of the river Vjosa and village are intertwined. The river in Greek is known as Vovousa by the village of Vovousa and the surrounding area, while in Aromanian both are called Băiasa. Aoos, the ancient name of the river, was preserved in the subsequent forms Voosa and Vovousa. These forms maintained the f sound of the mainland Doric Greek dialect in the toponym, or later developed a dentolabial v between vowels, influenced by the Albanian article.

The historian Gottfried Schramm described the Albanian Vjosë, and the Albanian prepositional forms vijosje/vijosja 'trench', as the basis for the Serbo-Croatian Vajusa and Vojuša. He wrote one of the unstressed a or o forms in these names led to the Aromanian unstressed a, which ultimately formed the name Băiasa. The linguist Kostas Oikonomou stated the toponym was formed in Aromanian from bă ĭasă 'lake, marsh' and derived from the noun baie meaning 'bath, mine' and the suffix -(i)oasă, linked to the Slavic banja and Latin balneum 'bath'.

== Geography ==
Vovousa is located on the river Vjosa and is one of the easternmost villages of Zagori. It is also located near the National Park of Valia Kalda (Valea Caldă in Aromanian/ Romanian, meaning „warm valley”). The single-arched stone bridge of Misios was built in 1748 with a donation by Alexis Mitsios from Vitsa.

== History ==
Vovousa was considered among the largest villages in Zagori. Most of its inhabitants moved in the 19th century to the vicinity of Serres in Macedonia. The village was burnt by the Germans on 23 October 1943.

== Demographics ==
Vovousa has an Aromanian population and is an Aromanian speaking village. In the early 21st century, elderly people were bilingual in the community language and Greek, whereas younger residents under 40 might have understood the community language but did not use it. Some Sarakatsani settled in the village during the early 20th century. The Sarakatsani are Greek speakers.
