= Syrrako =

Syrrako Συρράκο (Greek) Sãracu (Aromanian)
- Municipal unit
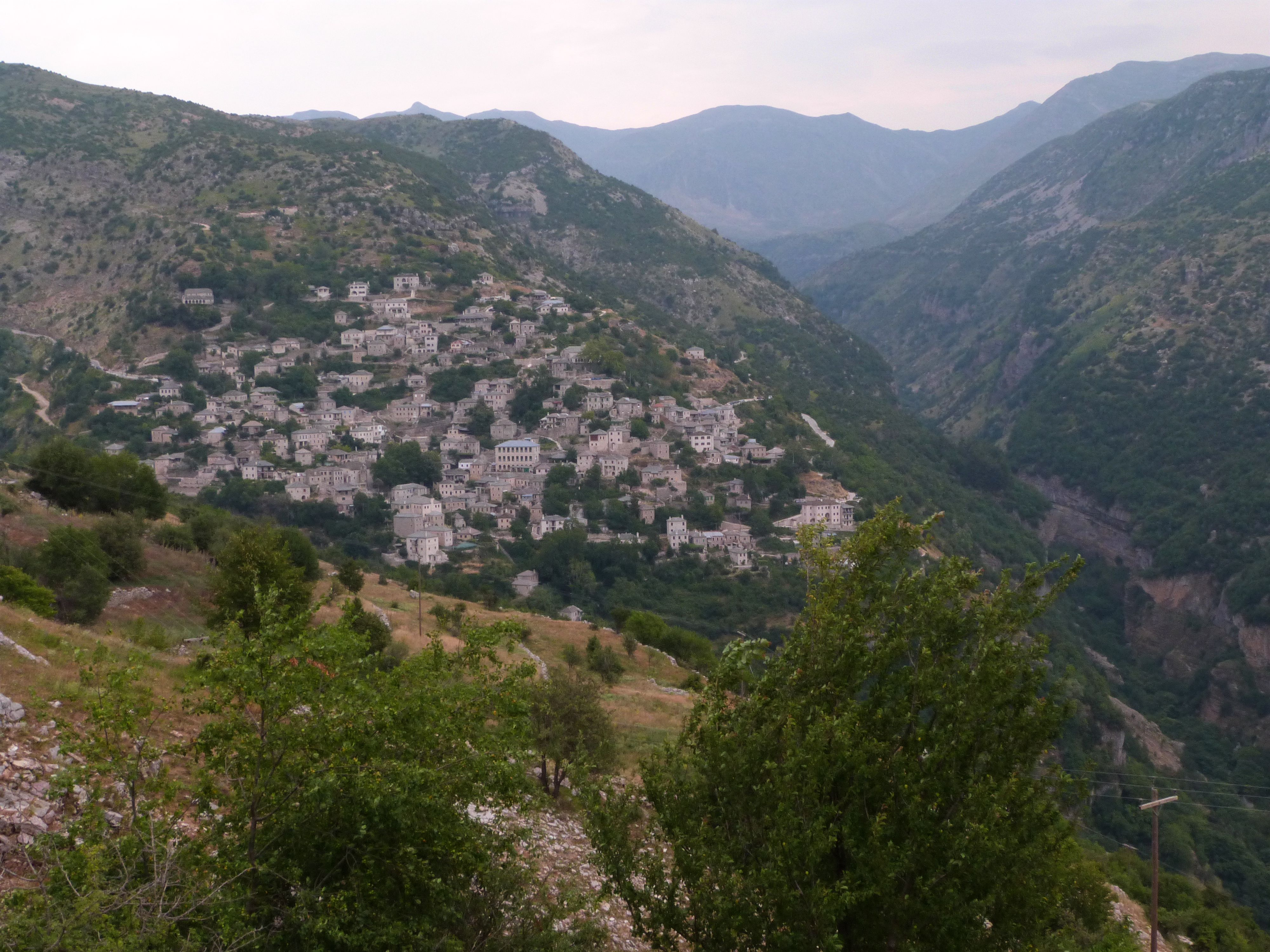
- View of Syrrako

- Location within the regional unit

- Location within Greece
- Coordinates: 39°36′N 21°06′E
- Country: Greece
- Administrative region: Epirus
- Regional unit: Ioannina
- Municipality: North Tzoumerka

Area
  - Municipal unit: 29.307 km^{2} (11.315 sq mi)

Population (2021)
  - Municipal unit: 391
  - Municipal unit density: 13.3/km^{2} (34.6/sq mi)
- Time zone: UTC+2 (EET)
  - Summer (DST): UTC+3 (EEST)
- Vehicle registration: ΙΝ

Syrrako (Greek: Συρράκο, between 1940 and 2002: Σιράκο, Sirako; Aromanian: Sãracu) is a village and a former community in the Ioannina regional unit, Epirus, Greece. Since the 2011 local government reform it is part of the municipality North Tzoumerka, of which it is a municipal unit. The municipal unit has an area of 29.307 km^{2}. It is located 52 km southeast of Ioannina at an altitude of 1200 m, on the mountain Peristeri. It is built on a steep slope and retains its traditional buildings.

It is the hometown of the poet and author Kostas Krystallis and Prime Minister Ioannis Kolettis.

== Name ==
In the 19th century, the scholar Ioannis Lambridis wrote that the placename referred to 'poverty and bareness', while the scholar Panagiotis Aravantinos said the name stemmed from a namesake owner from Ioannina. The linguist Max Vasmer derived the toponym from the Slavic word širokъ, meaning 'wide'.

The linguist Kostas Oikonomou supported the etymology provided by the linguist Phaedon Malingoudis, who derived the name from the Slavic sirakъ 'poor, orphan', from the root sirъ 'orphan', which in reference to a location, indicates a 'barren, infertile' landscape. Malingoudis also wrote that the toponym may not have been a direct naming by the Slavs and instead was one given by Albanians. The root is used in multiple Slavic and a few Albanian placenames and in a personal name, Sirakos, associated with the Slavic toponym. K. Spanos derived the placename from the family name Syros, formed from Syros and the suffix -akos, which Oikonomou stated was possible but unlikely, as the term Syros referred to someone from Syria and similar names with the root are found in several old codices throughout nearby Thessaly. Another possibility that cannot be excluded is the surname Sirakos forming the placename, although Oikonomou wrote that the existence of Sirakos as a first name makes that less likely.

== Geography ==
Syrrako is built on the slopes of Mount Peristeri (Lakmos) in the Pindus, offering natural shelter and security.

Syrrako is separated from its twin village Kalarrytes by the deep ravine of the river Chroussias, a tributary of the Arachthos. Tradition says that the river's name derives from Νeoptolemos' son, Chroussios, who drowned there, not being aware of the fact that water rises fast during bad weather conditions.

Nearby are the attractions of Kipina Monastery built into a rocky mountain in the 13th century, and the Anemotrypa cave with its underground river.

== History ==
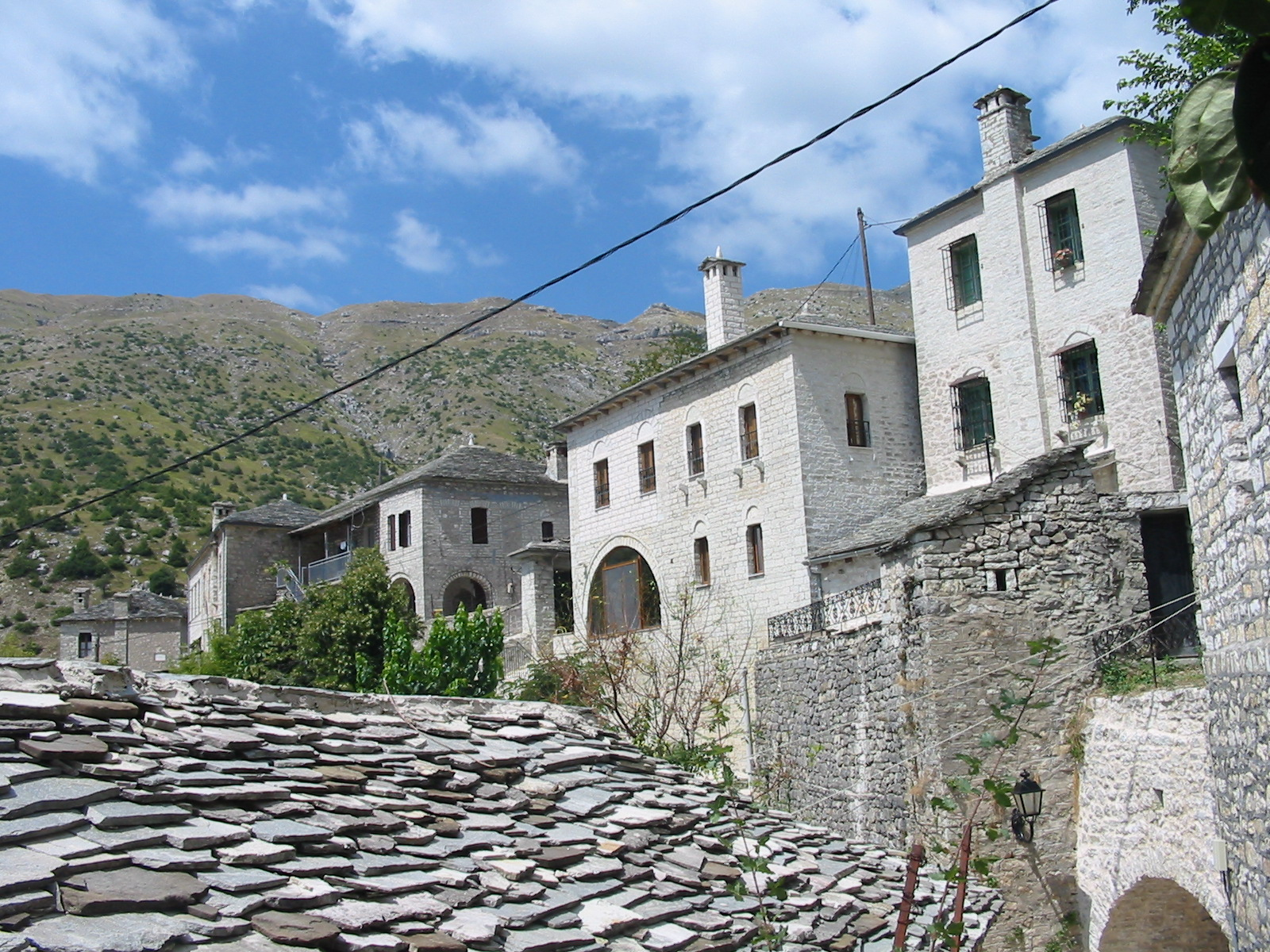
Houses

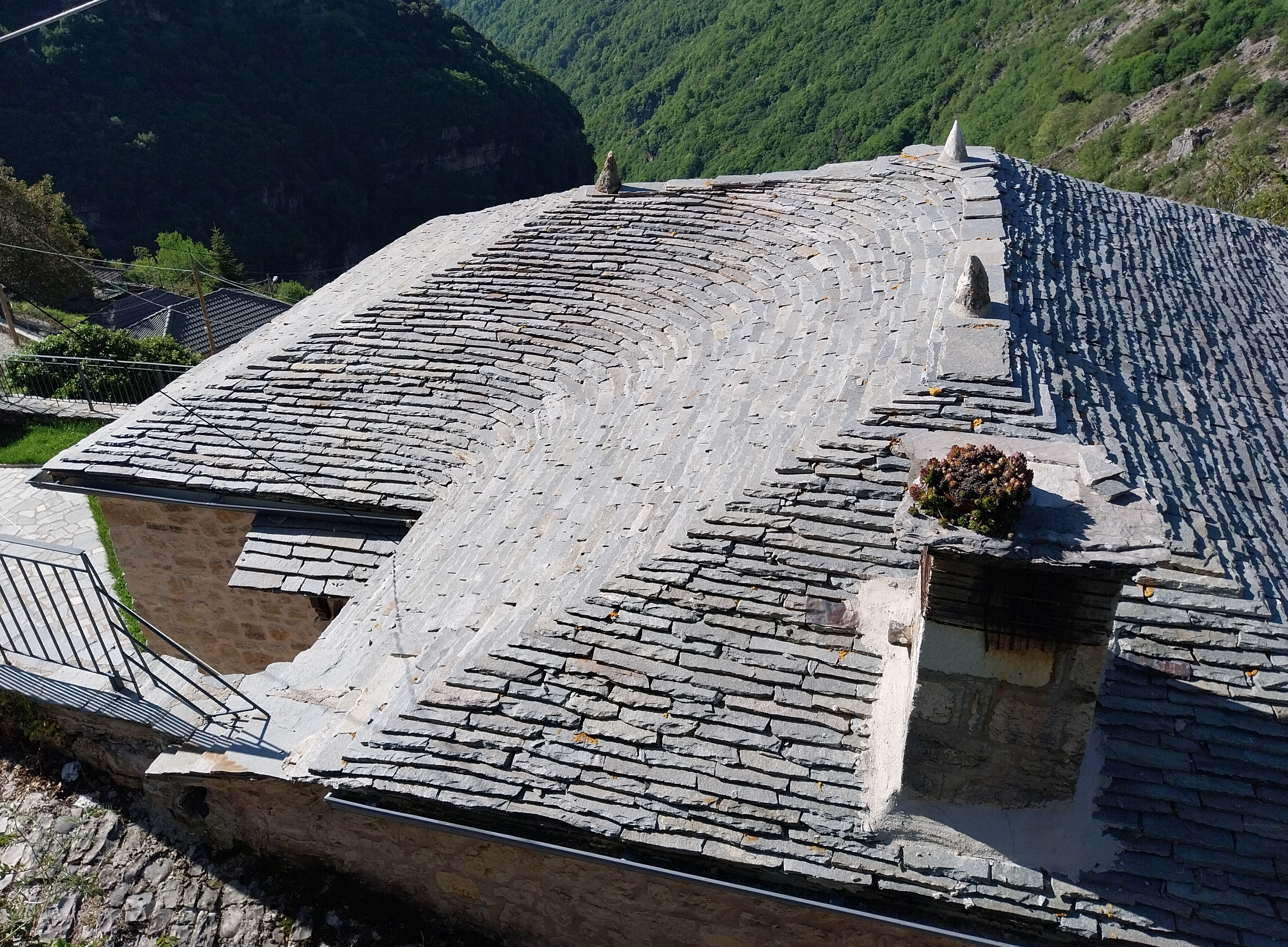
A slate roof in Syrrako (Greece), built with a curved valley layout and finials on top.

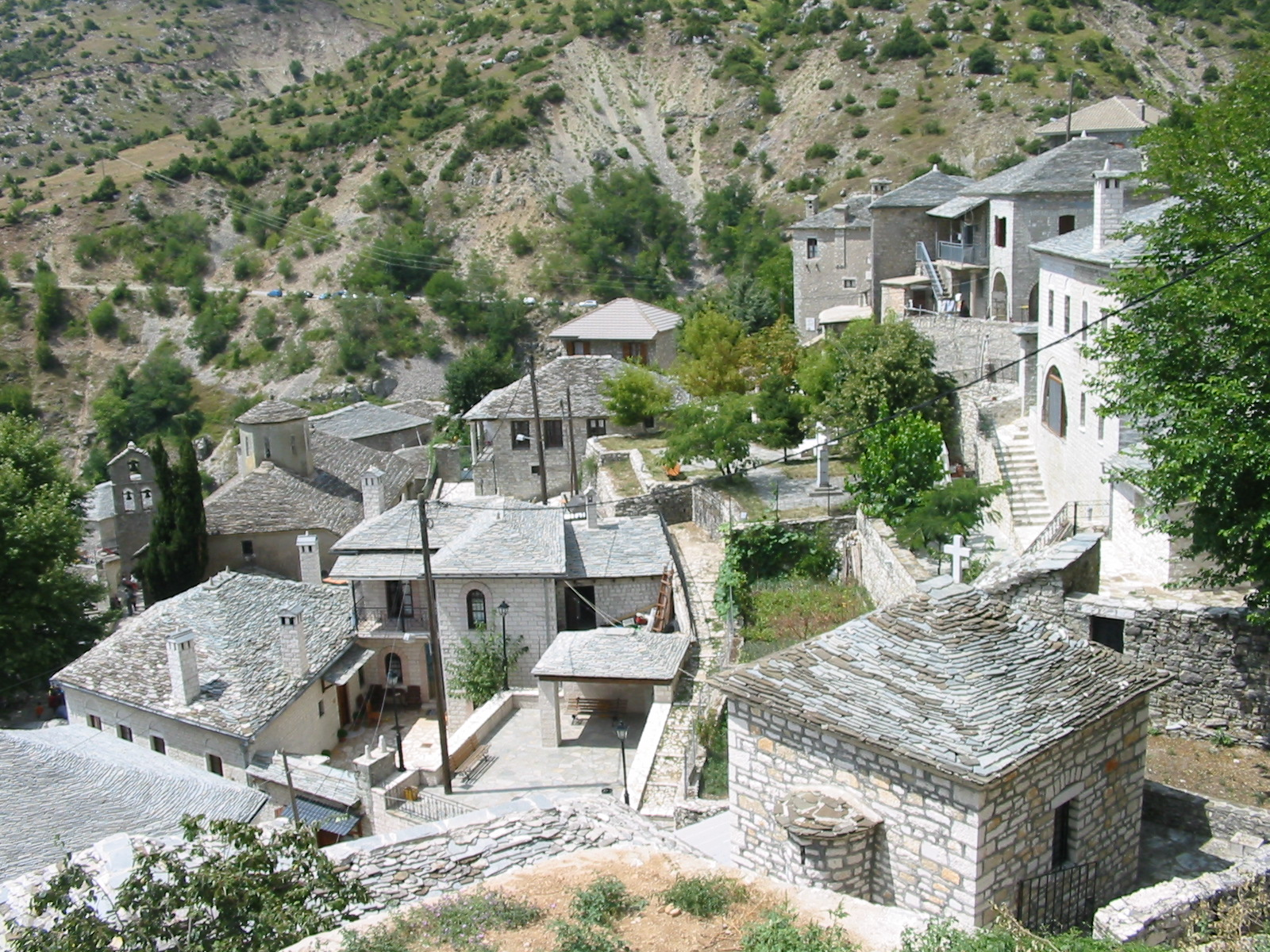
Overview

Syrrako was inhabited before the 15th century (possibly in the 11th century) by Aromanians (Vlachs). Evidence for this includes the age of the plane trees in the village square. During the Ottoman period, after 1480, it was the capital of the self-governed federation of Malakasioi, consisting of 42 villages and belonging to the Valide sultan. Because of this it enjoyed a privileged treatment. During that time the village developed immensely. Firstly, the inhabitants were involved in cattle breeding and afterwards they developed trade, industrial production of wool textiles and cattle products.

The expanse of pasture land (nearly 750 kmª) enabled the inhabitants to raise the number of sheep and goats to thousands (50,000 and according to others 75,000) and bring the big quantity of their products, in connection with the Syrrakiotes' trade genius, to the biggest trade centers in the Mediterranean and Black Sea (Italy, France, Spain, Odessa, Moscow, Bucharest, Belgrade, Constantinople and others).

Capes made in Syrrako were in great demand and it is said that even Napoleon's army was supplied with a large number of them. The travellers Leake and François Pouqueville report in the years 1815 and 1818 that they found in Syrrako "a trade cycle comparable to the best European cities". Furthermore, they mention the existence of significant libraries and the circulation of European newspapers, evidence that intellectual development co-existed with trade. Syrrako and Kalarrytes were the only villages in Epirus that took part in the first year of the 1821 Revolution with 720 families and 3,500 inhabitants. The Ottomans destroyed and burnt down the village, and the inhabitants abandoned it trying to save their lives (10 July 1821).

Only five buildings remained untouched, among them the church of the Panagia. The inhabitants returned in the year 1825 (according to others in 1827–28), rebuilt the village and between 1860 and 1870 the village became again as imposing as in the previous years. A second revolution took place in 1854 which was of no consequence. The decline of the wool trade and its replacement by other fibers (1908–10) hurt the local economy and led to changes in production patterns. At that time 530 houses and nearly 5,000 inhabitants existed in the village.

In the aftermath of the First Balkan War, Syrrako was joined to Greece on November 23, 1912. In the national census of 1913, Ioannina counts 17,000 inhabitants, Konitsa 2,000 and Syrrako 3,500.

== Demographics ==
Syrrako has an Aromanian population and is an Aromanian speaking village. In the early 21st century, elderly people were bilingual in the community language and Greek, whereas younger residents under 40 might have understood the community language but did not use it.

== Famous natives of Syrrako ==
- Kostas Krystallis (1868–1894), author and poet, he wrote "Mountain and Stable", "Stavraetos", "Shades of Hades" and "Vlachoi of Pindos" and many others.
- Ioannis Kolettis (1774–1847), first Constitutive Prime Minister of Greece (1844–1847), member of Filiki Eteria, minister of the Interior Affairs, of the Navy and Military, member of the " Three member Committee" after Kapodistria's death, ambassador in Paris (1836–1843).
- Georgios Zalokostas (1805–1858), poet and fighter during 1821.
- The army leaders Katsikogiannis, Lepeniotis and others, the benefactors G. Gianniotis, Sp. Baltatzis, G. Ikkos and many other men of literature, arts and trade.
