= Perivoli, Grevena =

Perivoli Περιβόλι Pirivoli
- Municipal unit
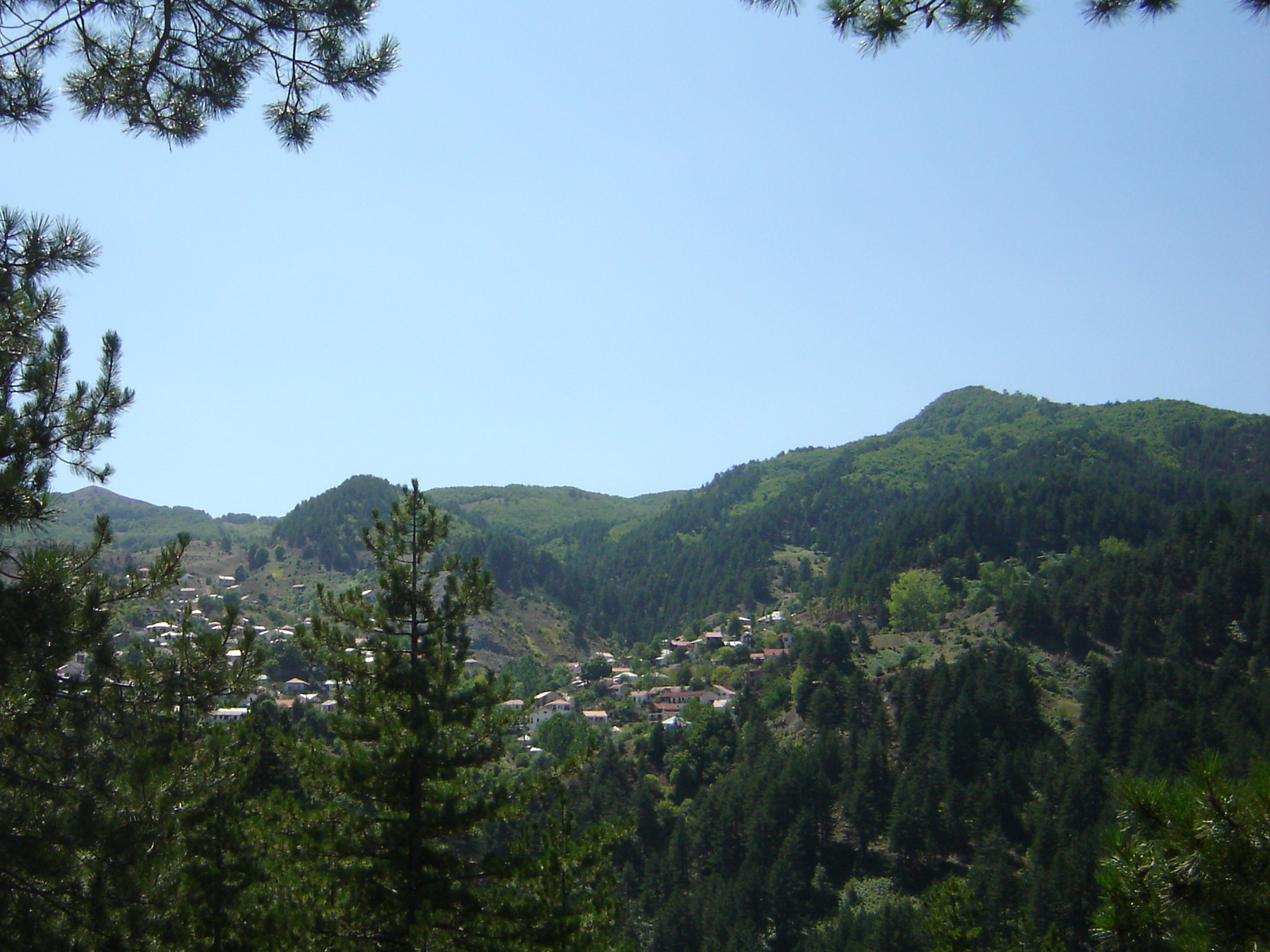
- Panoramic view of Perivoli from the east

- Location within the regional unit

- Location within Greece
- Coordinates: 39°59′N 21°07′E
- Country: Greece
- Administrative region: Western Macedonia
- Regional unit: Grevena
- Municipality: Grevena

Area
  - Municipal unit: 137.21 km^{2} (52.98 sq mi)
- Elevation: 1,280 m (4,200 ft)

Population (2021)
  - Municipal unit: 93
  - Municipal unit density: 0.68/km^{2} (1.8/sq mi)
- Time zone: UTC+2 (EET)
  - Summer (DST): UTC+3 (EEST)
- Postal code: 510 32
- Area code: 24620
- Vehicle registration: ΡΝ

Perivoli (Greek: Περιβόλι; Aromanian: Pirivoli) is a mountain village and a former community in Grevena regional unit, West Macedonia, Greece. Since the 2011 local government reform it is part of the municipality Grevena, of which it is a municipal unit. Its population was 93 inhabitants as of 2021. The municipal unit has an area of 137.210 km^{2}. The village is inhabited during winter by only 10-20 people due to extreme snow. However, the population rises to 4,000 people during the summer. There are many restored houses, inns, restaurants and cafes in the village. Perivoli is an Aromanian (Vlach) village.

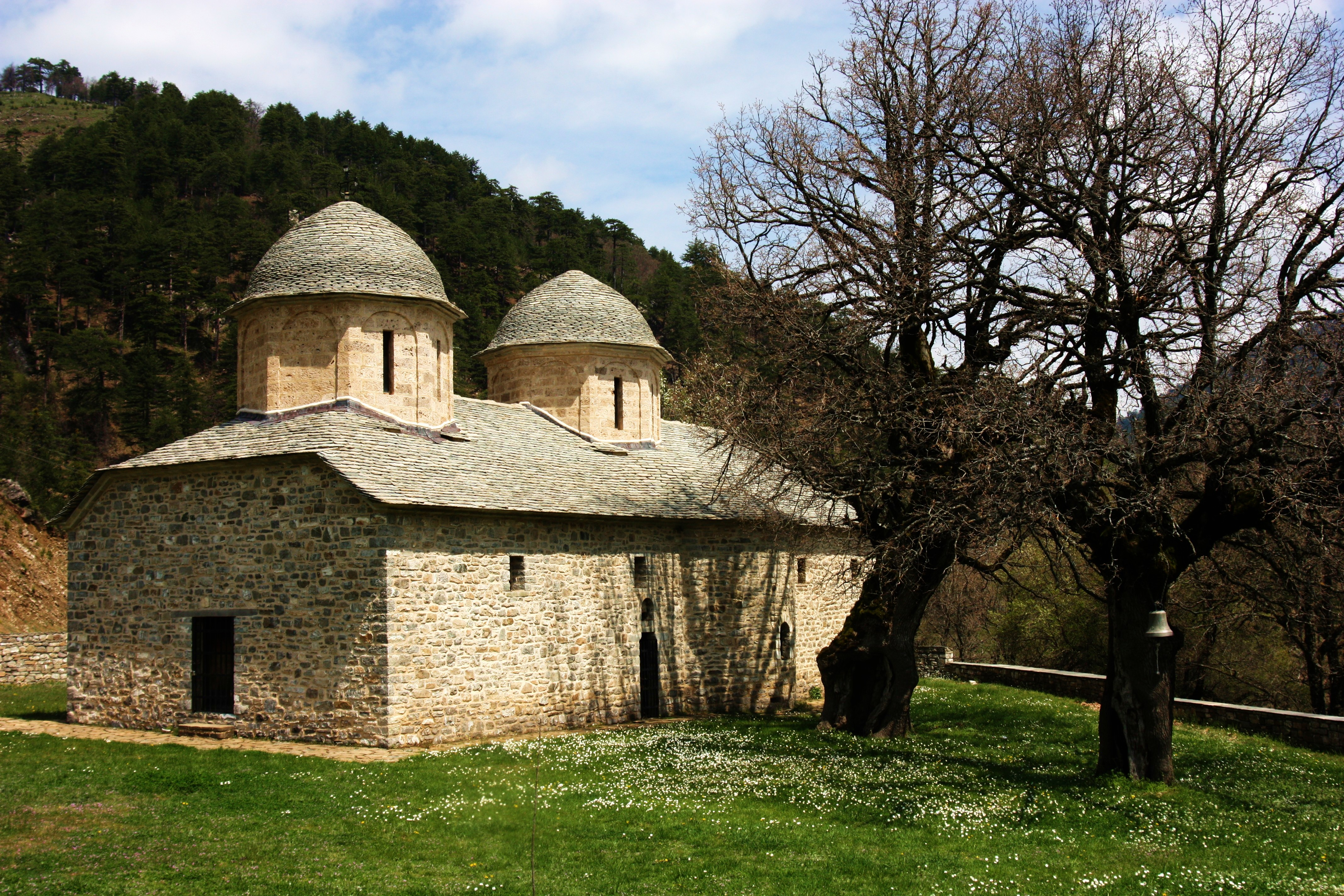
St Nicholas

== Geography ==
It is situated at an altitude of 1250–1370 meters in the southwest corner of Grevena regional unit in southwestern Macedonia. The municipal unit has a land area of 137 km² and consists solely of one village, Perivóli. The southernmost portion of the municipal unit is part of the Pindos National Park.
