= Katsanochoria =

Katsanochoria Κατσανοχώρια
- Municipal unit
- Location within the regional unit

- Location within Greece
- Coordinates: 39°29′N 20°59′E
- Country: Greece
- Administrative region: Epirus
- Regional unit: Ioannina
- Municipality: North Tzoumerka

Area
  - Municipal unit: 103.4 km^{2} (39.9 sq mi)

Population (2021)
  - Municipal unit: 1,592
  - Municipal unit density: 15.40/km^{2} (39.88/sq mi)
- Time zone: UTC+2 (EET)
  - Summer (DST): UTC+3 (EEST)
- Vehicle registration: ΙΝ

Katsanochoria (Greek: Κατσανοχώρια) is a former municipality in the Ioannina regional unit, Epirus, Greece. Since the 2011 local government reform it is part of the municipality North Tzoumerka, of which it is a municipal unit. The municipal unit has an area of 103.396 km^{2}. Population 1,592 (2021). The seat of the municipality was in Kalentzi.
