= Vathypedo =

Vathypedo Βαθύπεδο (Greek) Buzvală (Aromanian)
- Municipal unit
- Location within the regional unit

- Location within Greece
- Coordinates: 39°38′N 21°04′E
- Country: Greece
- Administrative region: Epirus
- Regional unit: Ioannina
- Municipality: North Tzoumerka

Area
  - Municipal unit: 10.127 km^{2} (3.910 sq mi)

Population (2021)
  - Municipal unit: 89
  - Municipal unit density: 8.8/km^{2} (23/sq mi)
- Time zone: UTC+2 (EET)
  - Summer (DST): UTC+3 (EEST)
- Vehicle registration: ΙΝ

Vathypedo (Greek: Βαθύπεδο, before 1928: Προσβάλα, Prosvala; Aromanian: Buzvală) is a village and a former community in the Ioannina regional unit, Epirus, Greece. Since the 2011 local government reform it is part of the municipality North Tzoumerka, of which it is a municipal unit. The municipal unit has an area of 10.127 km^{2}. Its population was 89 in 2021. Vathypedo is located on the slopes of the Sarmanitsa ridge, where a flat area at a lower altitude is traversed and drained by the Goura stream, a tributary of the Arachthos.

== Name ==
In the late 19th century, the scholar Ioannis Lambridis stated the name Prosvala referred to a precipitous area formed by subsidences, accurately describing the local geographic features without delving into the toponym's origin. Prosvala is derived from the Slavic prefix pro- meaning 'upon, through' and the Slavic noun sъvala 'marsh'. The unstressed ъ, equivalent to u in Greek, was omitted due to northern vocalism.

== Demographics ==
Vathypedo has an Aromanian population and is an Aromanian speaking village. In the early 21st century, elderly people were bilingual in the community language and Greek, whereas younger residents under 40 might have understood the community language but did not use it.
