= North Tzoumerka =

North Tzoumerka Βόρεια Τζουμέρκα
- Municipality
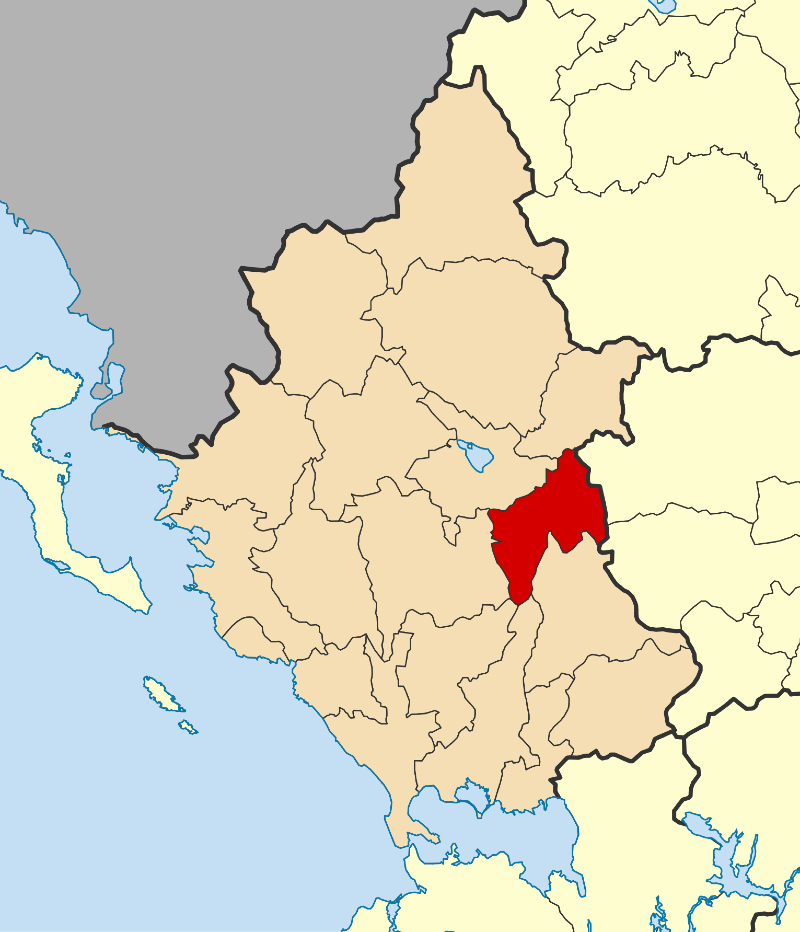

- Location within Greece
- Coordinates: 39°31′N 21°06′E
- Country: Greece
- Administrative region: Epirus
- Regional unit: Ioannina
- Seat: Pramanta

Area
  - Municipality: 358.33 km^{2} (138.35 sq mi)

Population (2021)
  - Municipality: 5,058
  - Density: 14.12/km^{2} (36.56/sq mi)
- Time zone: UTC+2 (EET)
  - Summer (DST): UTC+3 (EEST)
- Vehicle registration: ΙΝ

North Tzoumerka (Greek: Βόρεια Τζουμέρκα) is a municipality in the Ioannina regional unit, Epirus, Greece. The seat of the municipality is the village Pramanta. The municipality has an area of 358.334 km^{2}. The municipality is named after the Tzoumerka mountains.

== Municipality ==
The municipality North Tzoumerka was formed at the 2011 local government reform by the merger of the following 7 former municipalities, that became municipal units:

- Kalarites
- Katsanochoria
- Matsouki
- Pramanta
- Sirako
- Tzoumerka
- Vathypedo
