= Athamanika =

Greek mountain range

Athamanika Ori
- Tzoumerka
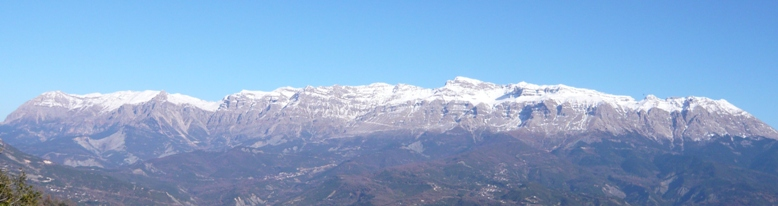
- View of the mountains from the west

Highest point
- Elevation: 2,429 m (7,969 ft)
- Coordinates: 39°29′N 21°12′E

Geography
- Location within Greece
- Location: Thessaly and Epirus, Greece
- Parent range: Pindus

Athamanika or Tzoumerka (Greek: Αθαμανικά or Τζουμέρκα) is a mountain range in northwestern Greece, part of the wider Pindus mountain range. Its highest point is the mountain Kakarditsa, at 2,429 m. Its length is approximately 40 km from north to south and its width is approximately 15 to 20 km from east to west. The only major road crossing the Athamanika is the Greek National Road 30 (Arta - Trikala - Karditsa - Volos).

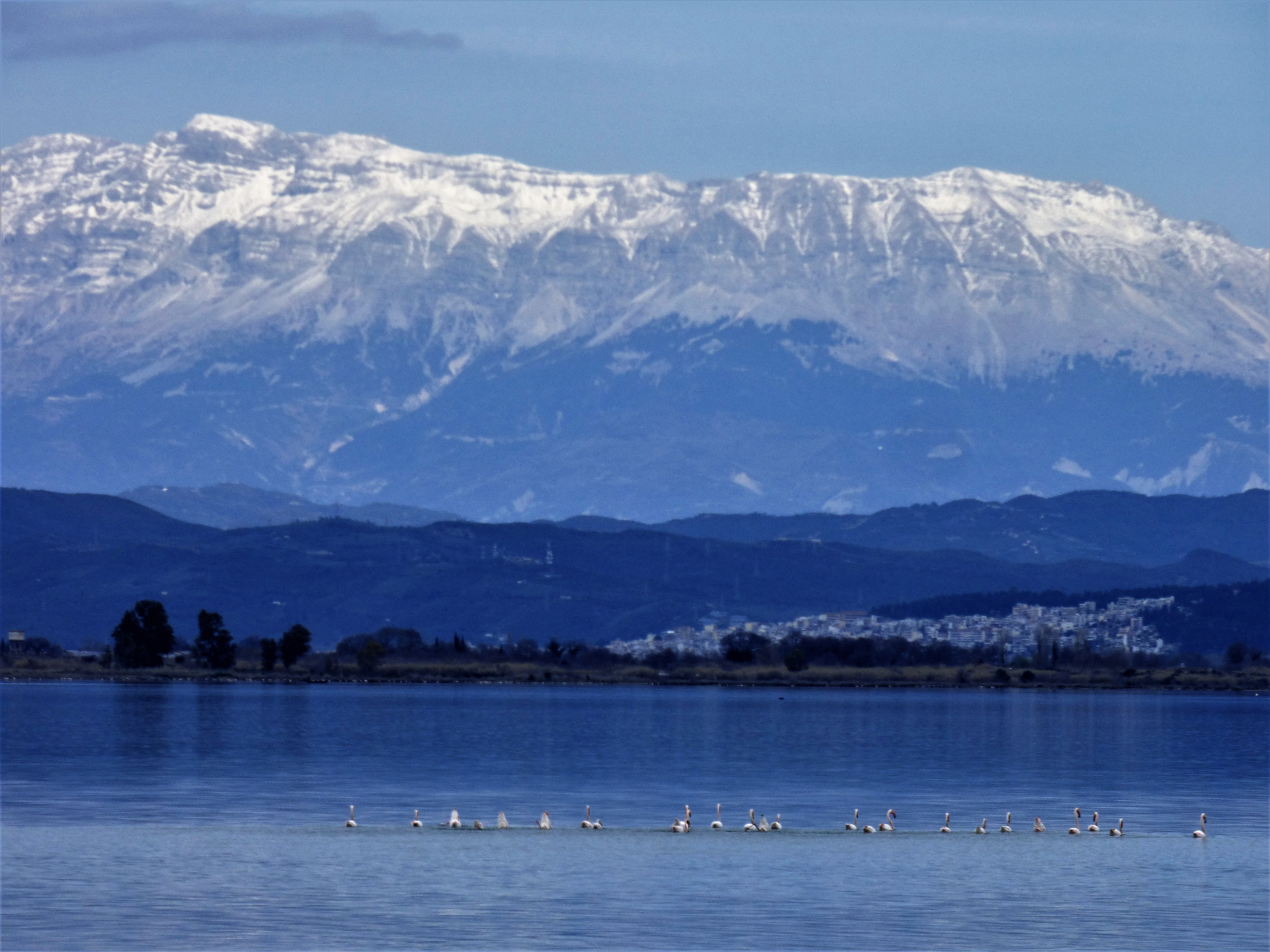
Snowy Athamanika

== Geography ==
The Athamanika is situated on the borders of the regional units of Arta, Ioannina, Karditsa and Trikala. It covers (part of) the municipalities North Tzoumerka, Central Tzoumerka, Pyli and Argithea.

It has a low population density. Forests dominate the low-lying areas of the mountain. Grasslands, shrubs and barren rocks dominate the higher elevations. The main rivers draining the Athamanika are the Arachthos in the west, and the Achelous in the east.

== History ==
The Athamanika mountain range became the main base of the EDES resistance organization during the Axis occupation of Greece (1941–1944).

== See also ==
- List of mountains in Greece
