= Ioannina (regional unit) =

Ioannina Περιφερειακή ενότητα Ιωαννίνων
- Regional unit
- Municipalities of Ioannina

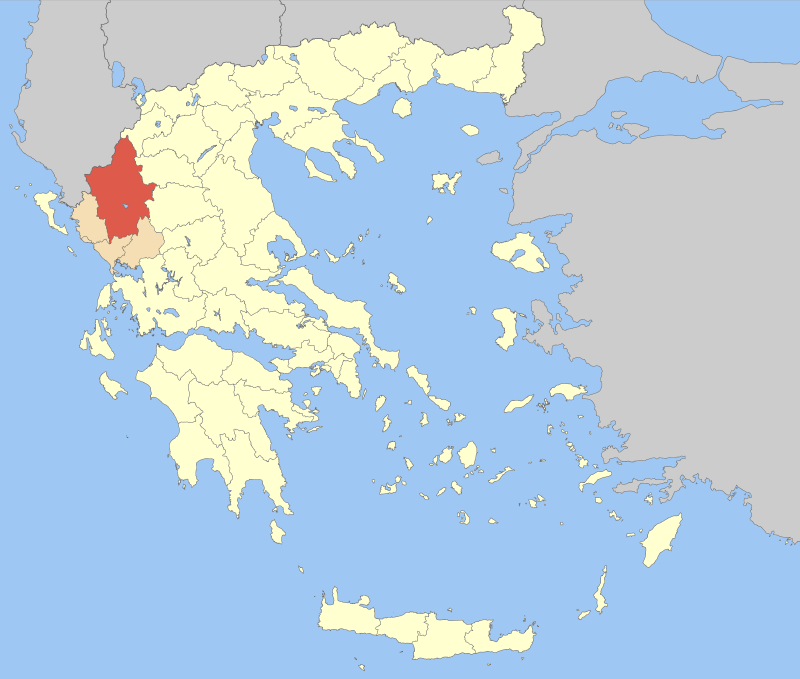
- Ioannina within Greece

- Location within Greece
- Coordinates: 39°45′N 20°50′E
- Country: Greece
- Administrative region: Epirus
- Seat: Ioannina

Area
  - Total: 4,990 km^{2} (1,930 sq mi)

Population (2021)
  - Total: 160,773
  - Density: 32.2/km^{2} (83.4/sq mi)
- Time zone: UTC+2 (EET)
  - Summer (DST): UTC+3 (EEST)
- Postal code: 44x xx, 45x xx
- Area code: 265x0
- Vehicle registration: IN
- Website: www.php.gov.gr

Ioannina (Greek: Περιφερειακή ενότητα Ιωαννίνων) is one of the regional units of Greece, located in the northwestern part of the country.

It is part of the region of Epirus. Its capital is the city of Ioannina. It is the largest regional unit in Epirus, and one of the largest regional units of Greece, with a population of 160,773 people, according to the 2021 census.

== Geography ==
Ioannina borders Albania in the north, and the regional units of Kastoria in the northeast, Grevena and Trikala in the east, Arta in the southeast, Preveza in the south and Thesprotia in the southwest and west.

Ioannina is a mountainous region, dominated by the Pindus mountains, that cover the eastern part of the regional unit. The main subranges of the Pindus are from north to south: Gramos, Smolikas (2,637 m, the highest of the Pindus), Tymfi, Lygkos, Lakmos and Athamanika. The lower Xerovouni mountains are situated in the south, and the Tomaros in the southwest.

Lake Pamvotida is the largest lake of Epirus. Several major rivers have their source in the Ioannina regional unit, including Aoös, Arachthos and Acheron.

== History ==
See also the history sections of the Epirus and Ioannina articles.

The area of the present regional unit of Ioannina joined Greece in 1913, after the First Balkan War.

== Administration ==
The regional unit Ioannina is subdivided into 8 municipalities. These are (numbered as in the map in the infobox):

- Dodoni (3)
- Ioannina (1)
- Konitsa (6)
- Metsovo (7)
- North Tzoumerka (Voreia Tzoumerka, 2)
- Pogoni (8)
- Zagori (5)
- Zitsa (4)

=== Prefecture ===
Ioannina was established as a prefecture in 1915 (Greek: Νομός Ιωαννίνων). As a part of the 2011 Kallikratis government reform, the regional unit Ioannina was created out of the former prefecture Ioannina. The prefecture had the same territory as the present regional unit. At the same time, the municipalities were reorganised, according to the table below.

New municipality	Old municipalities	Seat
Dodoni	Dodoni	Agia Kyriaki
Dodoni	Agios Dimitrios	Agia Kyriaki
Dodoni	Lakka Souliou	Agia Kyriaki
Dodoni	Selloi	Agia Kyriaki
Ioannina	Ioannina	Ioannina
Ioannina	Anatoli	Ioannina
Ioannina	Bizani	Ioannina
Ioannina	Ioannina Island	Ioannina
Ioannina	Pamvotida	Ioannina
Ioannina	Perama	Ioannina
Konitsa	Konitsa	Konitsa
Konitsa	Aetomilitsa	Konitsa
Konitsa	Distrato	Konitsa
Konitsa	Mastorochoria	Konitsa
Konitsa	Fourka	Konitsa
Metsovo	Metsovo	Metsovo
Metsovo	Egnatia	Metsovo
Metsovo	Milea	Metsovo
North Tzoumerka (Voreia Tzoumerka)	Pramanta	Pramanta
North Tzoumerka (Voreia Tzoumerka)	Vathypedo	Pramanta
North Tzoumerka (Voreia Tzoumerka)	Kalarites	Pramanta
North Tzoumerka (Voreia Tzoumerka)	Katsanochoria	Pramanta
North Tzoumerka (Voreia Tzoumerka)	Matsouki	Pramanta
North Tzoumerka (Voreia Tzoumerka)	Sirako	Pramanta
North Tzoumerka (Voreia Tzoumerka)	Tzoumerka	Pramanta
Pogoni	Kalpaki	Kalpaki
Pogoni	Ano Kalamas	Kalpaki
Pogoni	Ano Pogoni	Kalpaki
Pogoni	Delvinaki	Kalpaki
Pogoni	Lavdani	Kalpaki
Pogoni	Pogoniani	Kalpaki
Zagori	East Zagori	Asprangeloi
Zagori	Vovousa	Asprangeloi
Zagori	Central Zagori	Asprangeloi
Zagori	Papigko	Asprangeloi
Zagori	Tymfi	Asprangeloi
Zitsa	Pasaronas	Eleousa
Zitsa	Ekali	Eleousa
Zitsa	Evrymenes	Eleousa
Zitsa	Zitsa	Eleousa
Zitsa	Molossoi	Eleousa

=== Provinces ===
- Province of Dodoni - Ioannina
- Province of Konitsa - Konitsa
- Province of Metsovo - Metsovo
- Province of Pogoni - Delvinaki

Note: Provinces no longer hold any legal status in Greece.

== Transport ==
There are seven main roads that pass through the Ioannina regional unit: the A2 motorway (Egnatia Odos) and EO6 pass through the city of Ioannina, with the A2 heading towards Igoumenitsa and Thessaloniki, and the EO6 towards Volos and Igoumenitsa; the A5 (Ionia Odos) and EO5 start in the city, with both heading south towards Patras; the EO17 and EO20 also connects the city with Dodoni and Kozani respectively; and the EO22 runs from the EO20 at Kalpaki to the border with Albania near Kakavijë. The regional unit is also served by European routes E90, E92, E853 and E951, and 48 numbered provincial roads.

The regional unit is also served by Ioannina National Airport, a regional airport with seasonal flights to Europe.

== Tourism ==
The prefecture of Ioannina, like most of the Greek mainland, is not as popular as the islands among tourists. However, besides the city Ioannina, there are a number of attractions in the area, including:

- A few kilometres south of the city is the Vrellis wax statue museum, displaying scenes from Greek history. A small department in the city centre is free to the public.
- The Dodoni oracle and archaeological site with amphitheatre.
- The Vikos–Aoös National Park, including the Vikos gorge, through which the Voidomatis river flows.
- The Zagori villages, partly in the Vikos-Aoos National Park.
- Papingo, one of the Zagoria villages, a ski resort that is mainly popular with Greeks, and a popular starting point for hiking and mountaineering.
- Mount Smolikas, at 2,637 meters Greece's second highest mountain.
- Metsovo, in winter a ski resort.
- The caves of Perama, a few kilometres northeast of Ioannina.
- The monument in Zalongo for the women of Souli.
- The Kalpaki War Museum.
- Bourzani Bridge, near Melissoptera.
- Pavlos Vrellis Greek History Museum, the best known wax museum in Greece

== Sports ==
Ioannina has a major football club, that is named PAS Giannina. There are minor sports teams throughout the prefecture:

- AE Giannena
- Anatoli
- Averoff
- Dafnoula
- Doxa Kranoula
- Eleousa
- Kefalovrysi
- Metsovo
- Mousiotitsa
- Thyella Katsikas
- Thriamvos Serviana
- Velissario

== Literature ==
- Franz X. Bogner & Georgios Pilidis. Lake of Ioannina. 128 pages. ISBN 978-960-233-199-6. Ioannina 2010.

== See also ==
- List of settlements in the Ioannina regional unit
