= Papingo =

Papingo Πάπιγκο
- Municipal unit
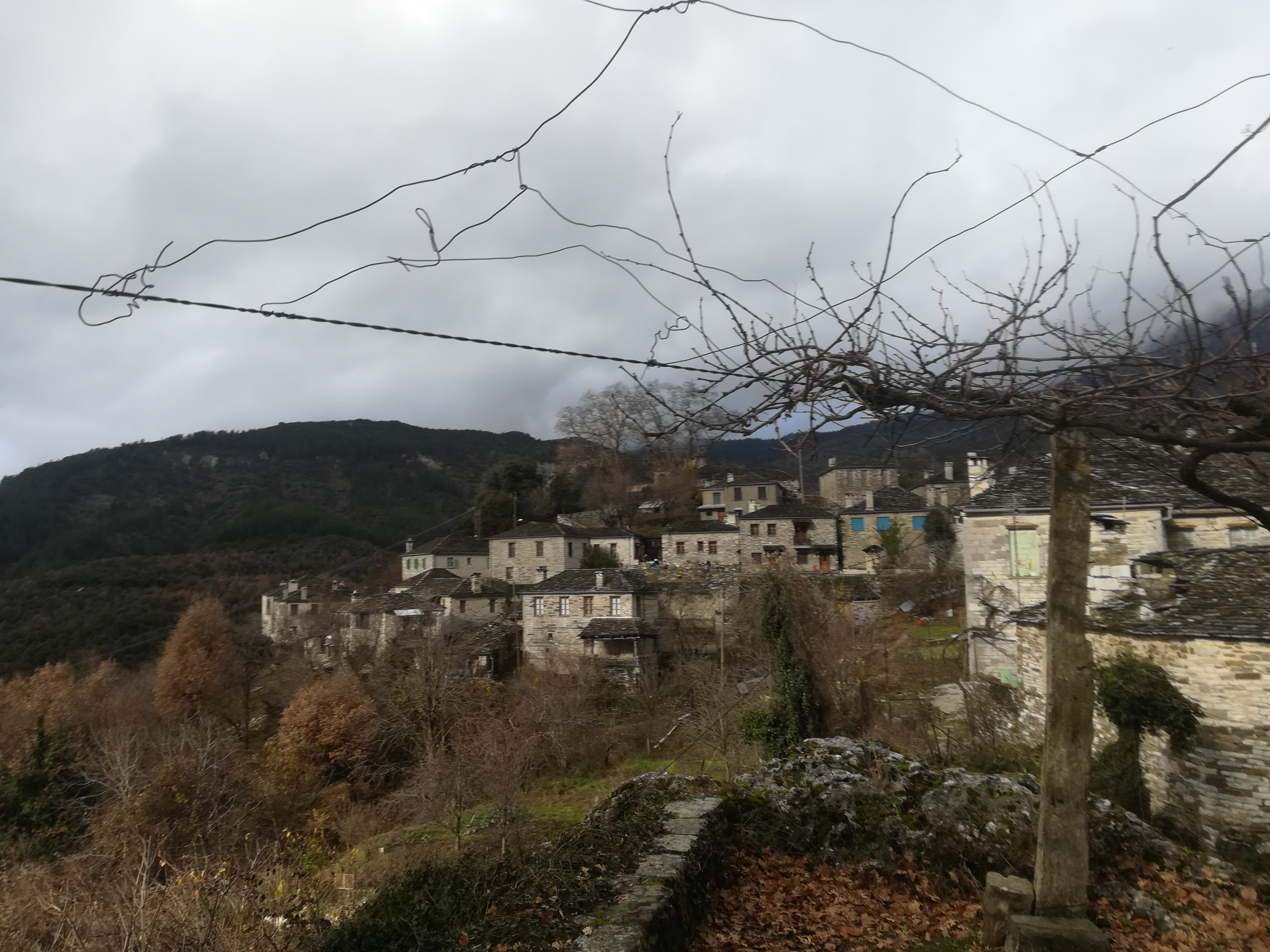
- Papingo

- Location within the regional unit

- Location within Greece
- Coordinates: 39°58′N 20°44′E
- Country: Greece
- Administrative region: Epirus
- Regional unit: Ioannina
- Municipality: Zagori

Area
  - Municipal unit: 34.131 km^{2} (13.178 sq mi)
- Elevation: 958 m (3,143 ft)

Population (2021)
  - Municipal unit: 223
  - Municipal unit density: 6.53/km^{2} (16.9/sq mi)
- Time zone: UTC+2 (EET)
  - Summer (DST): UTC+3 (EEST)
- Postal code: 44004
- Area code: 26530
- Vehicle registration: ΙΝ
- Website: www.papigo.gr

Papingo (Greek: Πάπιγκο, also transcribed as Papigko, Papigo) is a municipal unit in the Ioannina regional unit, Epirus, Greece. It is part of the municipality of Zagori. The municipal unit has an area of 34.131 sq km^{2}.

From 1919 to 2010, before the 2011 local government reform (the so-called Kallikratis Law), Papingo was a community.

Papingo consists of two villages: Megalo Papingo (Greek: Μεγάλο Πάπιγκο) and Mikro Papingo (Greek: Μικρό Πάπιγκο), greater and lesser Papingo. Both villages are in the Vikos–Aoös National Park at the base of Mount Radovoli, part of the Tymphe massif.

== Name ==
The toponym Papingo is an Albanian formation composed of the Albanian negative particle pa, and the noun peng, -u, meaning 'pledge, hostage', stemming from the Latin pignus 'pledge, hostage'. The linguist Kostas Oikonomou stated the historical circumstances which contributed to the toponym's creation are difficult to determine. The toponym is also the name of a peak Papingu on the Mt. Nemërçka chain in southern Albania. Oikonomou does not exclude the possibility the name could be a transfer of the toponym Papingu from one location to another, a phenomenon common in nomenclature, by past Albanian settlers or invaders in Zagori.

Papingo is also the name used for the Gamila mountain range, including Mt. Radovoli, by the Aromanian-speaking villages of Vrysochori and Iliochori. The inhabitants of Aristi and villages of the Voidomatis river basin use the forms Papigino and Papigiotiko for the mountain instead of the original name, due to the prominence of the village toponym. Oikonomou stated the local name may have been first given to the mountain range and later applied to the two villages as they arose. In the Zagori region, Albanian toponyms are among the few traces of a late medieval Albanian migration toward central and southern Greece.

The historian Stilpon Kyriakidis (1924) compared Papingo to the phonetically similar toponym Pap(p)ichion (mountain) and derived it from the personal name Pappikios, which Oikonomou wrote is not possible for phonetic and semantic reasons; similarly, a derivation given by Papaioannou (1987) is also not likely.

== Geography ==
The village of Papingo is located very near the northern end of the Vikos Gorge and is inside the Vikos–Aoös National Park. It attracts many hikers and mountaineers from around the world. The Vikos Gorge is the largest canyon in Greece and arguably in all of Europe: it is the gorge with the greatest depth to width ratio, according to the Guinness Book of Records 1997. The village of Papingo is surrounded by deciduous forests and topped by the snowcapped Astraka peak of Mt Tymphe, that towers over the village. It has modest lodging provisions as well as tavernas serving traditional food, coffee, and spirits.

The climate of the region is Mediterranean transitioning to Continental with heavy snowfalls in the winter and considerable rainfall and humidity also during the other seasons of the year. There is a very diverse flora and fauna, because of the many microenvironments, such as streams, rivers, lakes, forests, agricultural land, coppices, pasture, sub-alpine grassland and the unique biotope of the Vikos Gorge.

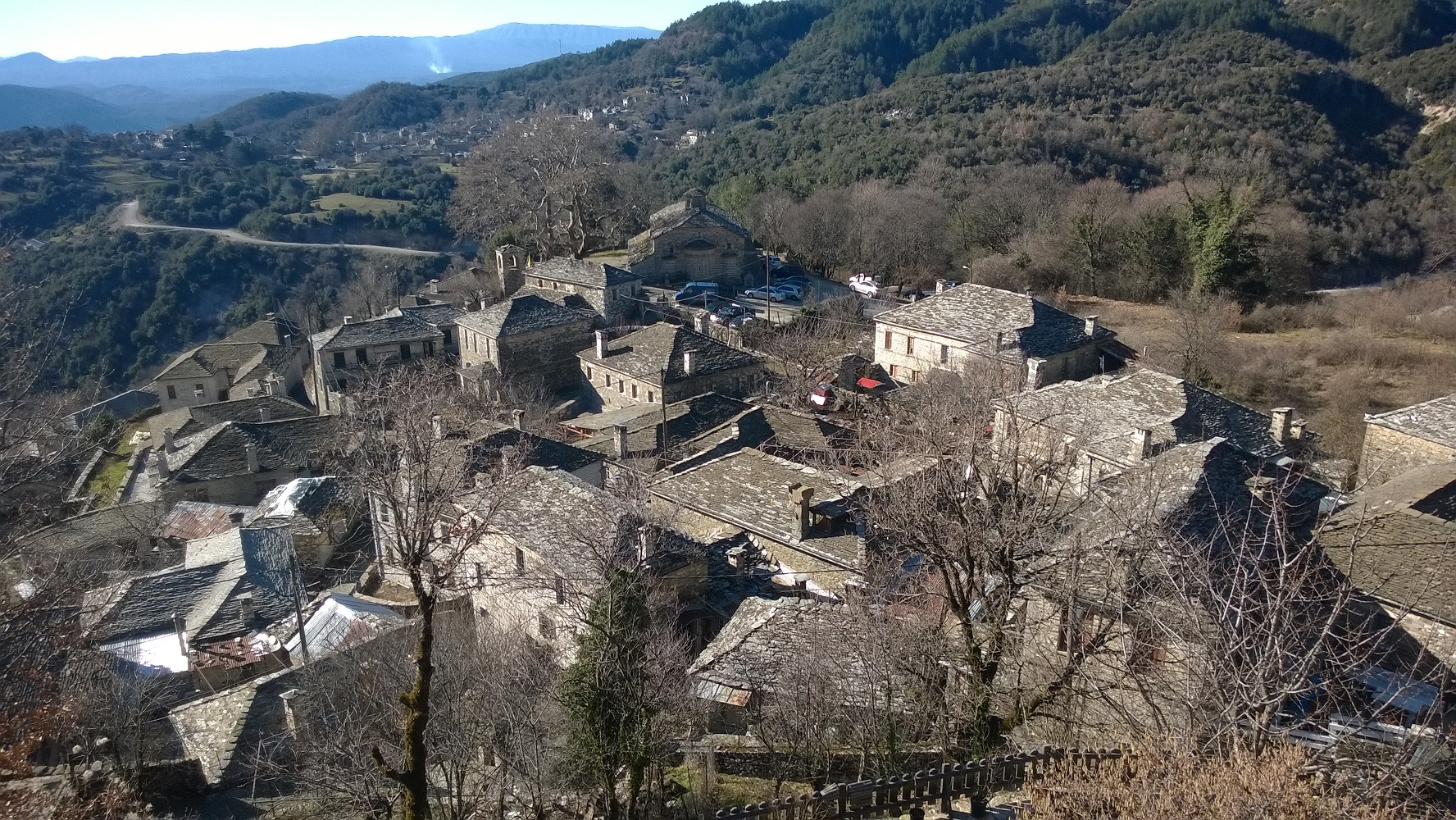
Mikro Papingo

A footpath leads up from the village through the sub-alpine plateaus of Mt Tymphe to Drakolimni (Dragonlake), a glacial lake at an altitude of 2000 m. The trek to the lake lasts about 5 hours. Along the way, at an altitude of 1950 m, there is a mountain refuge, the Mountain Hut of Tymphe or of Astraka. It normally operates from May to October although it has solar panels that enable its use throughout the year. Use during the winter months can be arranged by appointment.

Another landscape attraction is a series of rock pools known as the Kolymbethres (Greek term for "baptismal fonts") or the Ovires of Rogovos, which have been formed in the limestone by the Rogovos stream running down Mt Tymphe.

== History ==
Papingo is first mentioned in a bull of Byzantine emperor Andronikos III Palaiologos from 1325. In 1399, the Greek population of great Zagori and Papingo joined the Despot of Epirus, Esau, in his campaign against various Albanian and Aromanian tribesmen. At the beginning of the 15th century, the Chronicle of the Tocco reports that Leonardo Tocco Leonardo was on hand to rescue the people of Papingo from a Turkish attack. The inhabitants of Papingo were involved in the local conflicts of the early 15th century. Unlike the nearby valley areas that came under the control of Albanian rulers, Papingo retained an autonomous military and administrative structure which continued in the early period of Ottoman rule. After 1430 when the region came under Ottoman control Papingo became the capital of Zagori.

The village enjoyed a period of prosperity from the 15th to the 17th centuries due to the special privileges that the region of Zagori had secured from the Ottoman Sultan. During the 17th and 18th centuries various locals became folk healers, known as Vikos doctors, who used local herbs for various diseases.

A Greek school called the Kallineios School was built in 1897 with funds by Michael Anagnostopoulos, a wealthy expatriate living in the United States of America. The village's prosperity ended in the 19th century when the administrative privileges were withdrawn. A demographic decline ensued that continued through the 20th century, even after the union of Epirus with Greece following the Balkan Wars. The villages suffered greatly in the Second World War and Greek Civil War and by the 1980s, they were almost completely depopulated. Since then however, the population has increased, largely due to their popularity as touristic destinations. The 2021 census recorded 184 inhabitants in Papingo and 39 in Mikro Papingo.

== Demographics ==
Megalo Papingo is inhabited by Greeks, Arvanite families who assimilated into the local population and some Sarakatsani who settled in the village during the early 20th century. The arrival of Orthodox Albanians (locally called "Arvanites") occurred in the modern period and originate from the wider Souli area in central Greek Epirus, while the Sarakatsani are Greek speakers. Mikro Papingo is inhabited by Greeks.

== Culture ==
The Kallineios School, founded in 1897, houses also the library of its founder, Michael Anagnostopoulos. Among the churches of Megalo Papingo, the church of Saint Blaise (Agios Blasios) dates from 1852 but is built on top of the foundations of an older church from 912. The church of Saint George (Agios Georgios) dates from 1774 and was renovated in 1880. The church of Panagia is also said to date from 1774. Outside Papingo near the main road that leads to the village is the Monastery of St Paraskevi (Agia Paraskevi), a Byzantine foundation. The 18th century church of the Archangels Michael and Gabriel (known also as the Taxiarchs) in Mikro Papingo has a wonderful wooden screen made by Epirotan craftsmen. It was originally the chapel of a monastery and its only remaining building.

== Notable people from Papingo ==
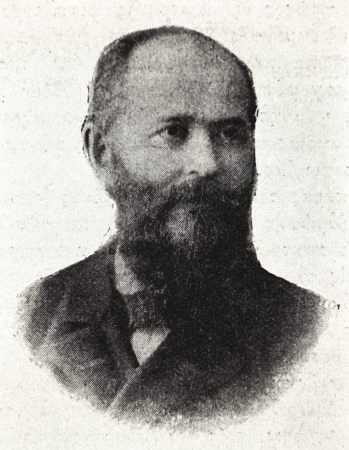
Michael Anagnostopoulos (Anagnos)

- Michael Anagnos or Michael Anagnostopoulos (1837–1906), philanthropist and director of Perkins Institution and Massachusetts Asylum for the Blind.
- Georgios Anagnostopoulos (1884-1936), linguist.
- Zacharias Sardelis (1830–1913), scholar and journalist.
