= Tymphe =

Mountain in Greece

- Τύμφη
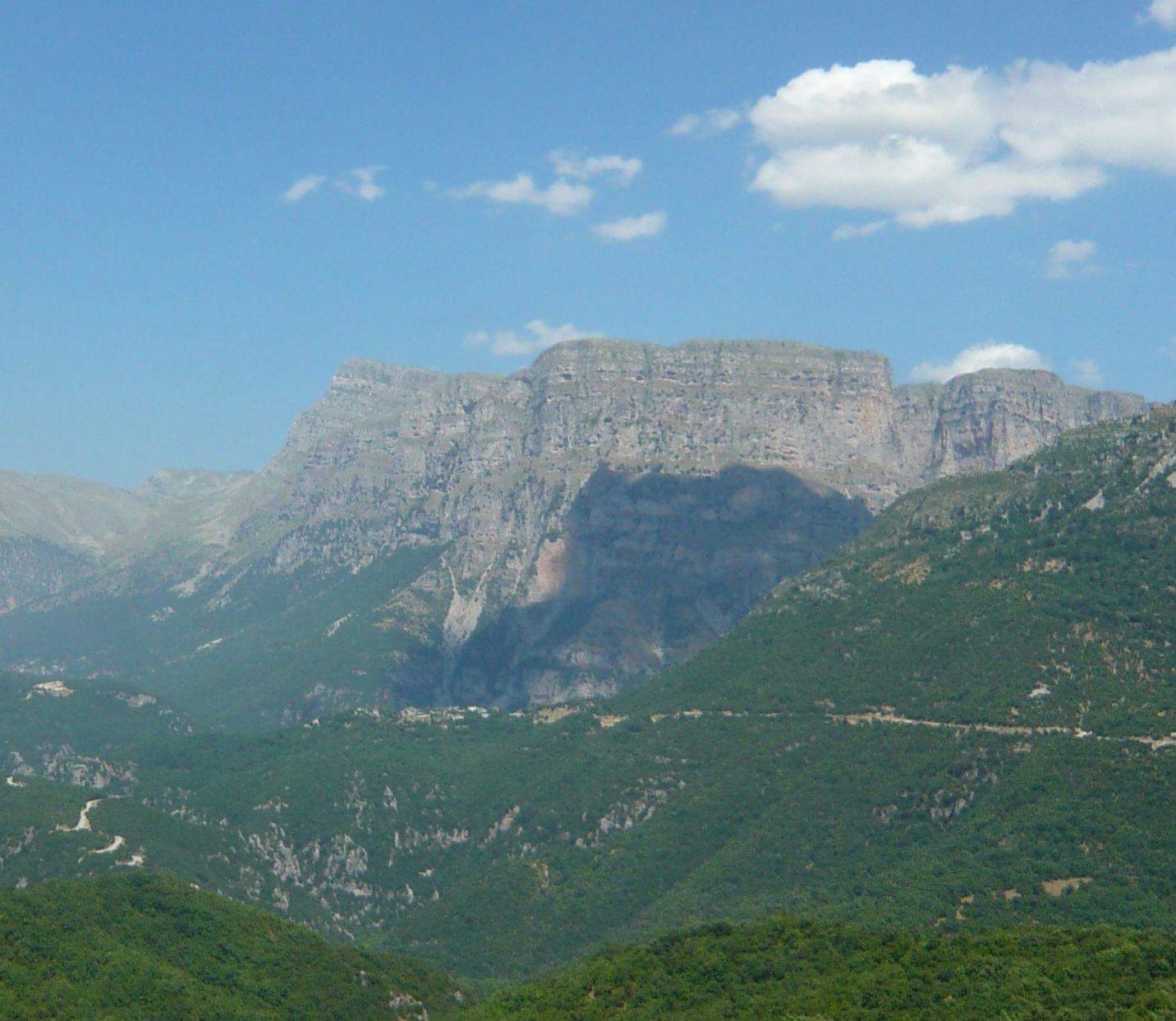
- View of the west face of Mount Tymphe during summer

Highest point
- Elevation: 2,497 m (8,192 ft)
- Prominence: 1,266 m (4,154 ft)
- Coordinates: 39°58′54″N 20°48′54″E

Geography
- Location within Greece
- Location: Ioannina regional unit, Epirus, Greece
- Parent range: Pindus
- Topo map(s): HMGS Tsepelovo; Anávasi Topo 50 Pindus Zagori

Geology
- Rock age: Palaeocene-Eocene
- Mountain type: Fold mountain

Climbing
- First ascent: unknown; first recorded climbing: 1956
- Easiest route: walk

Tymphe (in Latin and English usage) or Tymfi (in the Greek government's preferred transliteration), Timfi, also Tymphi (Greek: Τύμφη, [ˈtimfi]) is a mountain in the northern Pindus mountain range, in northwestern Greece. It is part of the regional unit of Ioannina and lies in the region of Zagori, just a few metres south of the 40° parallel. Tymphe forms a massif with its highest peak, Gamila, at 2,497 m (8,192 ft).

The massif of Tymphe includes in its southern part the Vikos Gorge, while they both form part of the Vikos–Aoös National Park which accepts over 100,000 visitors per year. The former municipality of Tymfi owed its name to the mountain.

== Etymology ==
The exact meaning of the name is not known but has been in use since ancient times. The name "Tymphe" or "Stymphe" is mentioned by ancient geographer Strabo, Book 7, Ch. 7, and is associated with the ancient land of Tymphaea and the Tymphaeans, one of the tribes of Ancient Epirus. Despite its ancient use, the name does not appear in any descriptions of the area by Greek or foreign geographers of the 19th century. In du Bocage's map of the region, made in 1820, the mountain is referred to as "Paleo-Vouni" (Greek for Old-Mountain) and Pouqueville mentions the name "Lazaris" in 1826.

The etymology of the mountain's peaks are mainly of Greek origin. The highest peak Gamíla (Γκαμήλα, [gaˈmila]) means camel in Greek; Karterós (Καρτερός, [karteros]) means mighty or powerful; Megála Lithária (Μεγάλα Λιθάρια, [meˈɣala liˈθarja]) means big rocks in modern Greek; Astráka (Αστράκα, [astraka]) is a Greek word for a roof's eaves derived from Slavic стреха; Lápato (Λάπατο, [lapato]) is the Greek word for sorrel; the name for the mountain's third highest peak Goúra (Γκούρα, [gura]) is from a common modern Greek word derived from the Latin gula also related to Aromanian gură: a mountain spring; Tsoúka Róssa (Τσούκα Ρόσσα, [ˈt͡suka ˈrosa]) means "red peak" in Aromanian.

== Geography ==
The mountain is surrounded by various massifs that also form part of the northern Pindus mountain range. Northeast of Tymphe lies the highest mountain of Pindus, Smolikas. The mountain of Trapezitsa lies to the north, Lyngos to the east and Mitsikeli to the south. The Aoos river flows to the north of Mt Tymphe while its tributary Voidomatis has its sources in the mountain. Vikos Gorge is formed by the Voidomatis on the southwestern side of the mountain. The length of the mountain is approximately 20 to 25 km with a direction from east to west and its width is approximately 15 km from north to south. The southern and southeastern slopes of the mountain are comparatively smooth. The north side, however, forms cliffs reaching 400 m (1,312 ft), whereas the western side is equally steep since the mountain is fragmented by Vikos Gorge.

The massif includes several peaks that stand above 2400m. From west to east the most prominent are the following: Astraka, 2,436 m (7,992 ft), Ploskos, 2,377 m (7,799 ft), Gamila, 2,497 m (8,192 ft), Gamila ΙΙ, 2,480 m (8,136 ft), Karteros, 2,478 m (8,130 ft), Megala Litharia, 2,467 m (8,094 ft), Tsouka Rossa, 2,379 m (7,805 ft), and Goura, 2,466 m (8,091 ft). The peaks form a plateau. Astraka, dominates the plateau on its northern face. A mountain hut named D. Georgoulis, which operates during the summer months, is located at the mountain pass between the peaks of Astraka and Lapatos at 1930m of altitude. There are several lakes on the mountain, some of which dry out during the summer. The most famous of those that have water year-round is Drakolimni (lit. "Dragon lake" in Greek), formed after the retreat of the glaciers. It is located at a height of 2,000 m (6,562 ft) northwest of Ploskos. Its maximum depth is 4.95 m (16 ft), while its surface covers 1 ha (2 acres).

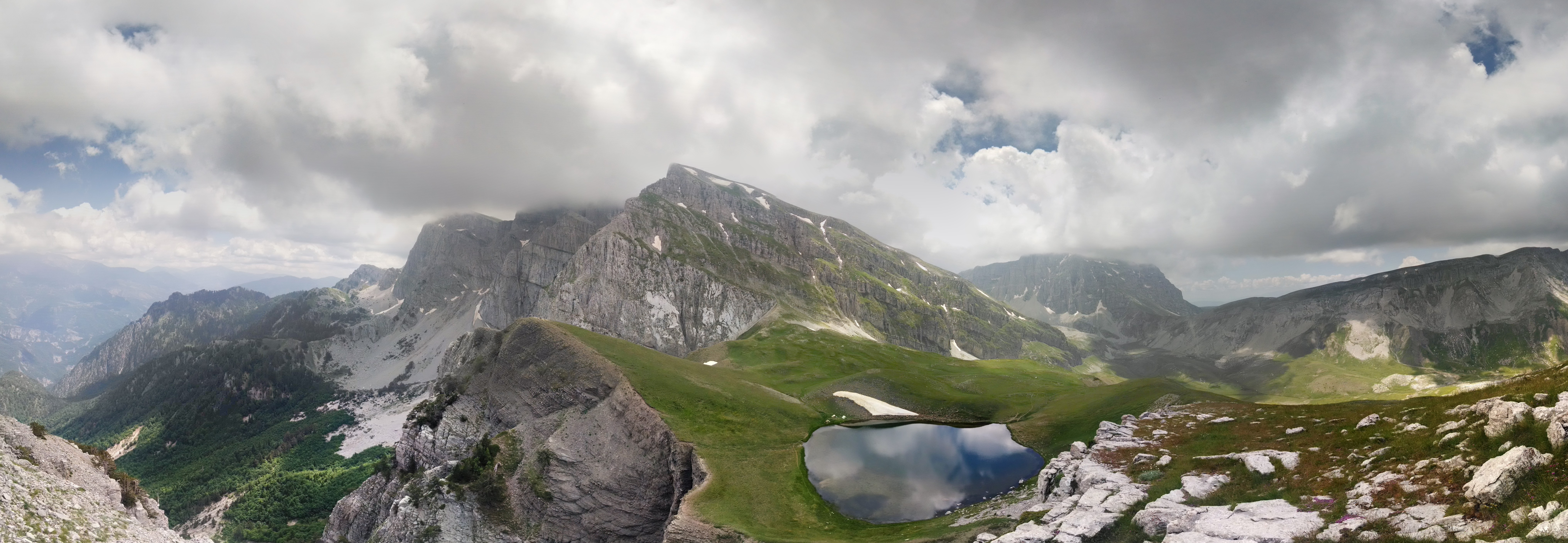
A panoramic view of Mt. Tímfi. On the left you can see Gamíla peak in the clouds, in the center is Plóskos and below it a Drakolímni, to the right topped in clouds is Astráka, and at the far right Lápatos. At the border between Astráka and Lapatos is the mountain hut D. Georgoulis.

=== Geology ===
Mount Tymphe represents a series of uplifted fault blocks and faulted escarpments and is largely composed of Palaeocene-Eocene limestone, with some exposures of Campanian-Jurassic dolomite and limestone on the northern scarp. The lower slopes are dominated by younger flysch rocks, which consist of thin beds of graded sandstones intercalated with softer, fissile siltstones. Extended glacial conditions prevailed on the uplands of Mount Tymphe during the Late Quaternary period, ca. 28,000 years ago. The glacial landscape is well-developed, especially on the southern slopes of Mount Tymphe, across the Astraka-Gamila plateau, and in the upland terrain above the villages of Skamneli and Tsepelovo, where lateral and terminal moraines form major landscape features. Additional forms of glacial deposits, which extend down to 850 m (2,789 ft) above sea level, include rock glaciers and limestone pavements.

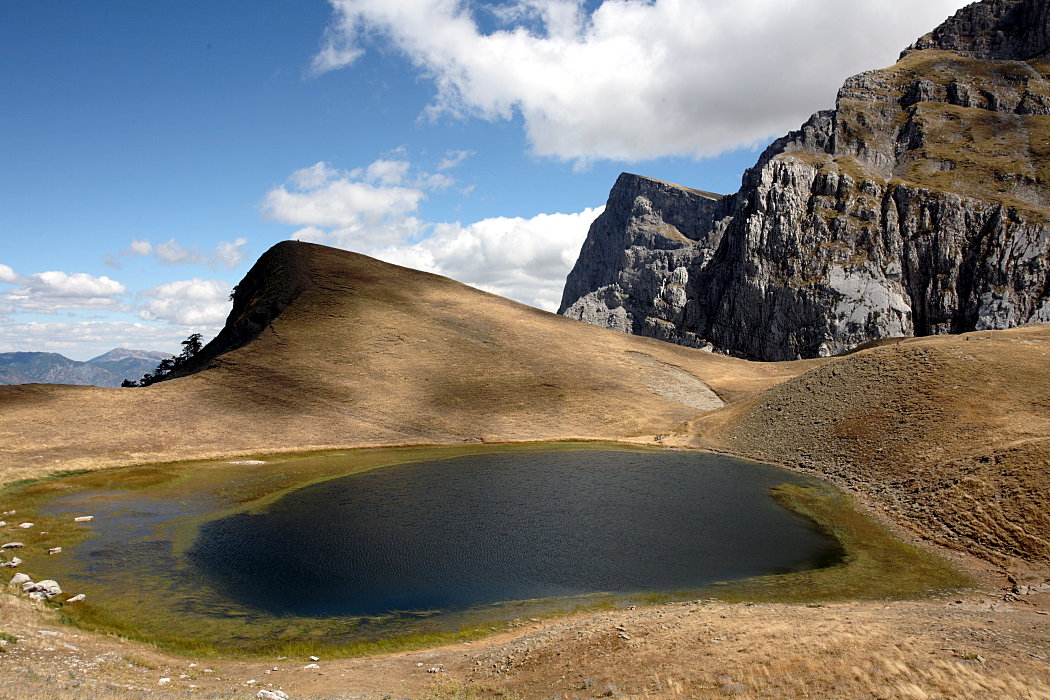
Drakolímni (2054 m) with Gamíla summit (2497 m) to the background. The cliffs on the right edge of the picture belong to Plóskos (2377 m)

A number of vertical caves and precipices are found in the area around the village of Papingo, in the vicinity of the Gamila and Astraka peaks. Some of them have been given names inspired from mythology, such as the Hole of Odysseus and Chasm of Epos. They are being studied and explored by caving enthusiasts. The cave of "Provatina" (Lit. "Ewe's Cave"), with a depth of 408 m (1,339 ft), one of the deepest in the world, was first discovered in 1965 by British speleologists of the Cambridge University Caving Club, and has since then been surveyed by a large number of expeditions. The nearby Chasm of Epos, with a depth of 451 m (1,480 ft), drains the water coming from the surrounding plateaus.

=== Climate ===
There is no meteorological station at the mountain itself and the closest one is located at the village of Papingo. The overall climate of the Vikos–Aoös National Park which includes the mountain is Mediterranean, transitioning to continental. The Mediterranean character is characterized by the annual distribution of precipitation, high in the winter months and experiencing a drought period of two to three months in summer. The continental climatic element is attributed to the high amplitude of annual temperature variation, to such a degree that the difference between mean maximum and mean minimum annual temperature, exceeds 40 °C (104 °F). Extremely low temperatures occur in the area during the winter months. Compared to Mediterranean bioclimatic divisions, the area belongs to the humid zone with cold winters. Conditions in the mountain might be significantly different from those of lower regions in the same area. Winters are particularly harsh and the mountain is covered in snow from autumn until late May.

== Αccess ==
The mountain is located at the Zagori region and the nearest settlements are mainly villages. Iliochori, Vrysochori and Laista lie to the east, Skamneli and Tsepelovo to the south, and Papingo and Vikos to the west and southwest respectively. Facilities in the aforementioned villages vary, but most of them offer restaurants and accommodation. The nearest town is Konitsa to the northwest. The closest city with an airport is Ioannina, approximately 60 km south of Papingo. The coach service from Ioannina offers seven daily coaches to Konitsa and two weekly services to Papingo (on Fridays) as of 2011. The EO20 road, between Kozani and Ioannina, passes close to the western, northwestern and north sides of the mountain.

== Wildlife ==
Most of the mountain, with the exception of its southernmost part around the peak of Astraka, forms part of the Vikos–Aoös National Park. The park is a designated protected area and visitors should be aware of the limitations to activities imposed by the law. The World Wide Fund for Nature (WWF) runs an information centre in the village of Papingo.

Tymphe holds the largest recorded population of the Balkan chamois goat (Rupicapra rupicapra balcanica) in Greece, with a population between 120-130 individuals out of an estimated national population between 477–750. Although chamois is registered as least concern in IUCN's red list, the subspecies balcanica numbers some thousands of individuals and its population is believed to be declining. According to the Hellenic Ornithological Society mount Tymphe along with the neighbouring mountain Smolikas are important regions for breeding birds of prey, alpine and forest dwelling bird species. The Egyptian vulture, short-toed snake eagle, rufous-tailed rock-thrush breed in the region, whereas species such as the golden eagle, red-billed chough, rock partridge, alpine chough, wallcreeper, white-winged snowfinch and the alpine accentor are sedentary. Alpine reptilian and amphibian species are also present. Vipera ursinii lives in the mountain's subalpine meadows and is considered a threatened taxon. The amphibian alpine newts (Triturus alpestris), living in the alpine lakes of the mountain, mostly in and around Drakolimni, are associated with local folktales of dragons and dragon battles. Yellow-bellied toads (Bombina variegata) are also common in that same area.

== Ascent routes ==
The simplest and most commonly used route of ascent is the one beginning at the village of Mikro Papingo, located at the western side of the mountain at an altitude of 980 m (3,215 ft). The trail that leads to the Astraka mountain hut, is approximately 6 km long. It is part of the Greek national trail O3 and is generally well marked with signs (red diamond on white) and red dots and arrows on rocks and tree trunks. From the hut, the hikers might either head northeast to the drakolimni alpine lake for another 2.8 km or southeast to reach Gamila peak, which is the highest peak of the mountain at 2,497 m (8,192 ft) for another 6 km. In both cases there are no signposts and the hikers should solely rely on red dots marked on rocks or scarce small signs attached to wooden poles. The hike from Papingo to the hut lasts between 2–3 hours and the round-trip from the hut to drakolimni another 2 hours.

The mountain is also accessible from other surrounding villages but the trails are longer and the terrain rougher and steeper. Therefore, they are suggested for more experienced hikers. From the village of Vrysochori at the eastern side of the mountain, a trail of 12.8 km leads to Gamila peak through the Karteros Pass. From the village of Vradeto to the south of the mountain the trail to the peak is approximately 14.9 km. Trails that lead to the mountain can also be followed from Konitsa and Tsepelovo. Those routes are poorly and scarcely marked, mostly by dots of red paint on rocks, and are in some cases unclear and covered by vegetation.

=== Climbing ===
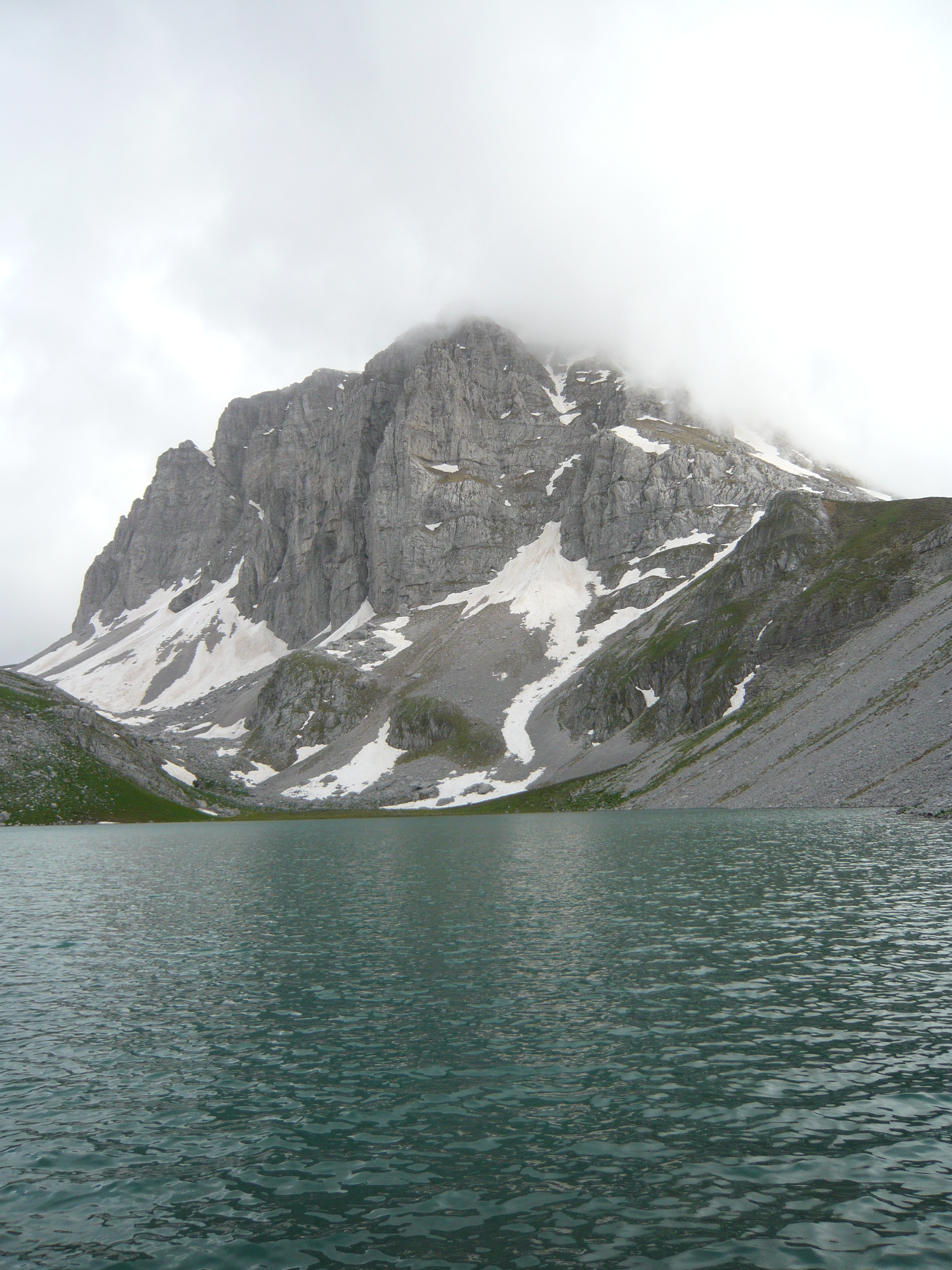
The north face of Astraka photographed in May. The field of Astraka has thirty climbing routes. Note that the lake in the foreground is seasonal

The first recorded climb of the mountain was made on 7–8 June 1956 by Giorgos Michailidis and Giorgos Xanthopoulos who climbed the face of Gamila. Four years later, on 25–26 August 1960, Guido Magnone and Spyros Antypas climbed the northeastern face of Gamila. Currently there are 17 climbing fields on the mountain, covering most of the major peaks and other geological features of the mountain. From the aforementioned fields, the northeastern face of Gamila counts 8 climbing routes, and Gamila II 6. The fields of Astraka and Tsouka Rossa have several climbing routes each. The former counts 30 routes in both its northwestern and northeastern faces, and the latter 19 routes. Potential climbers should take into account that several of the routes were first ascended several years ago and thus pitons might be compromised if present at all. Furthermore, some locations in the mountain are isolated and rescue services might find it particularly challenging to access the area in case of emergency.

== Gallery ==
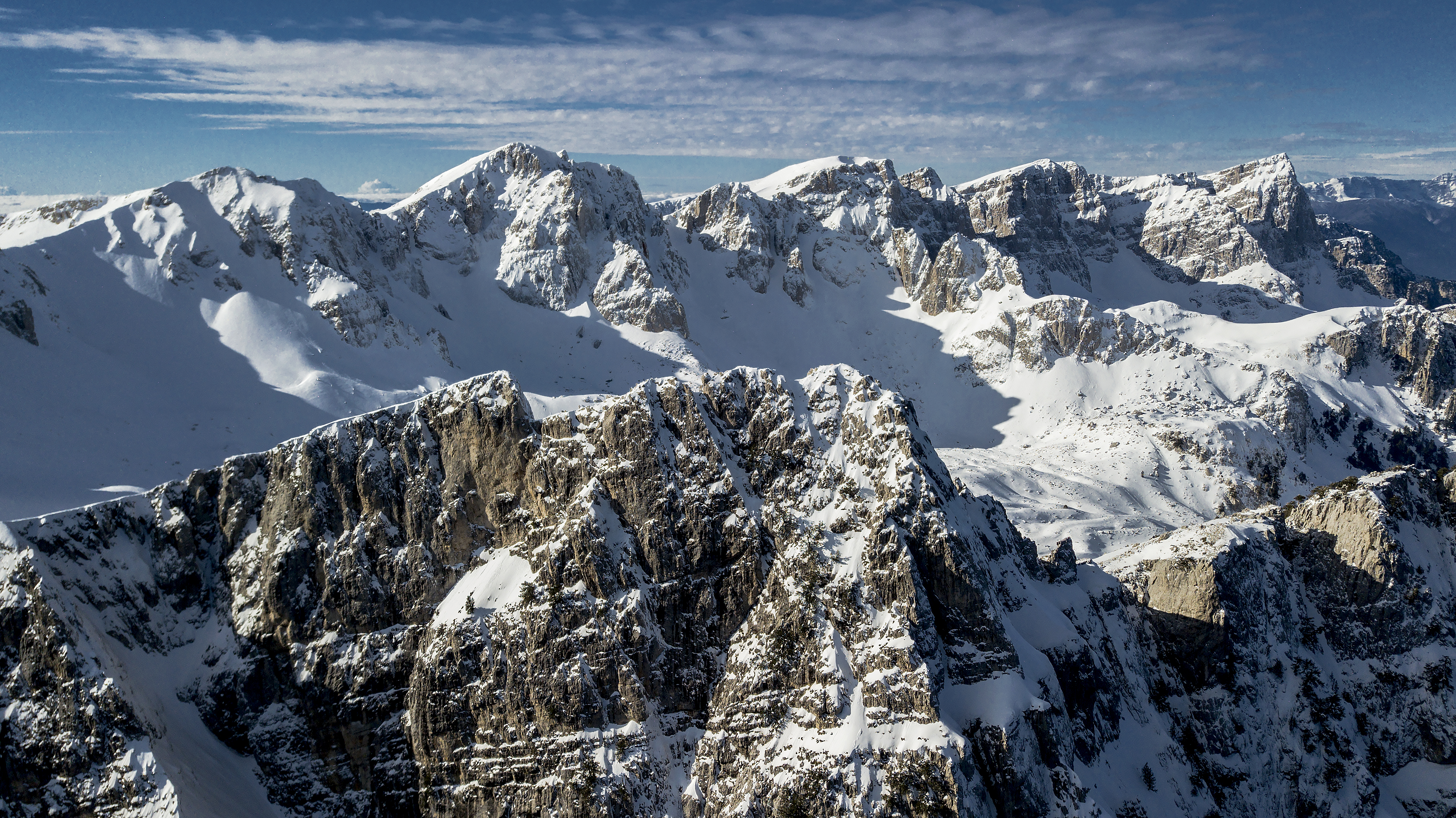
Αerial photography of Mt. Tymphe

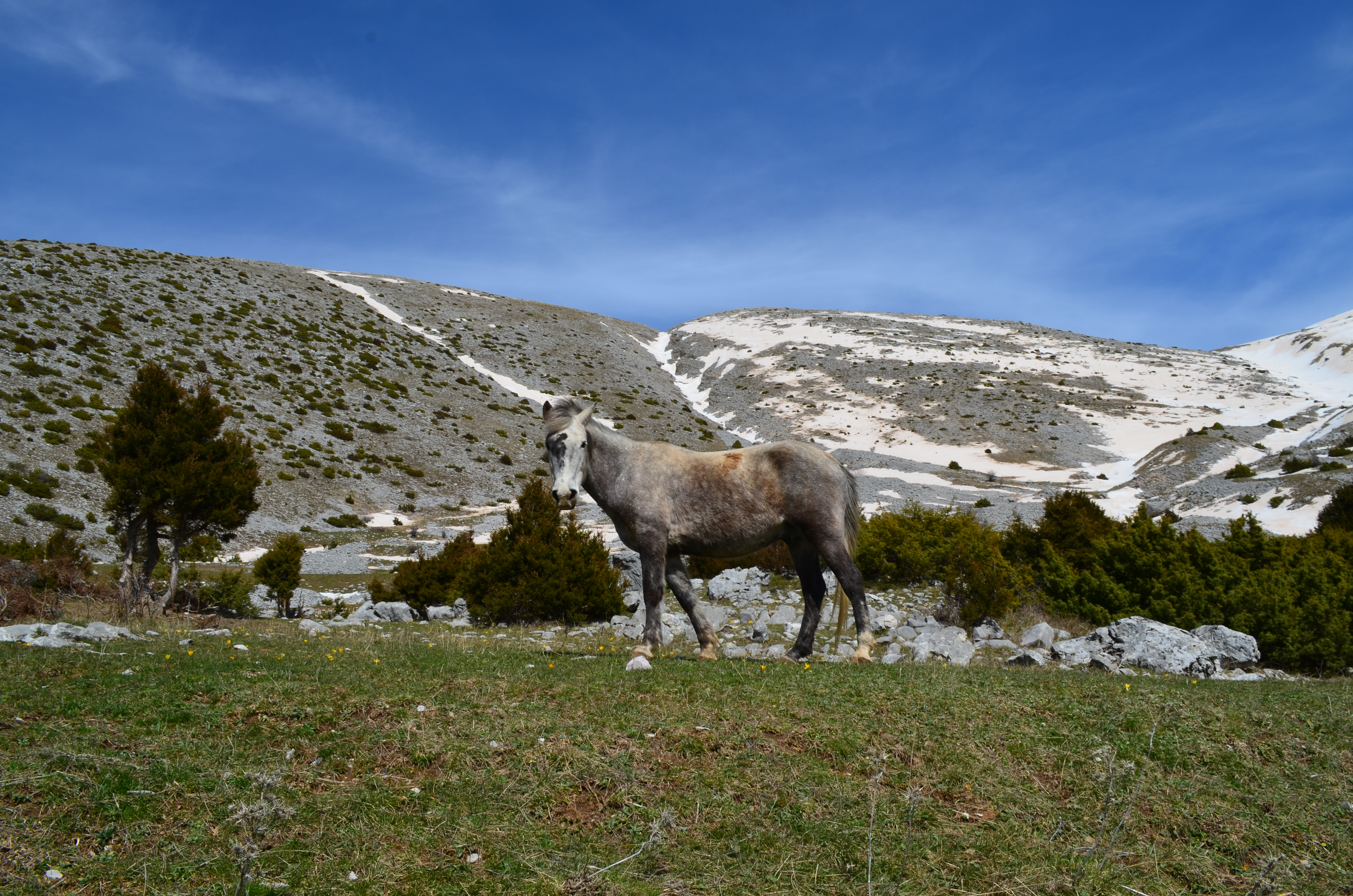
Horse in the snowy landscape of Mt. Tymphe

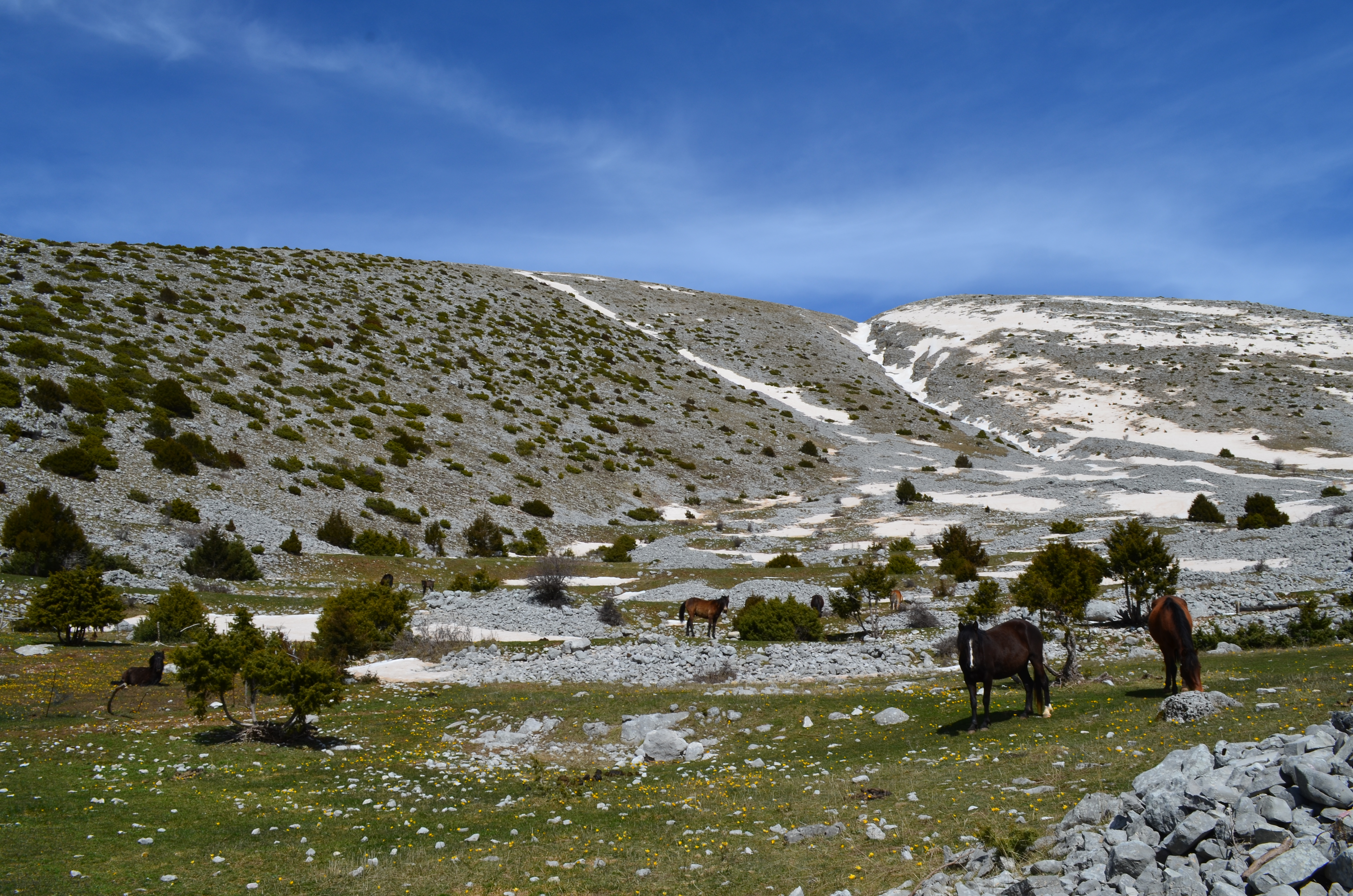
Horses in the snowy landscape of Mt. Tymphe

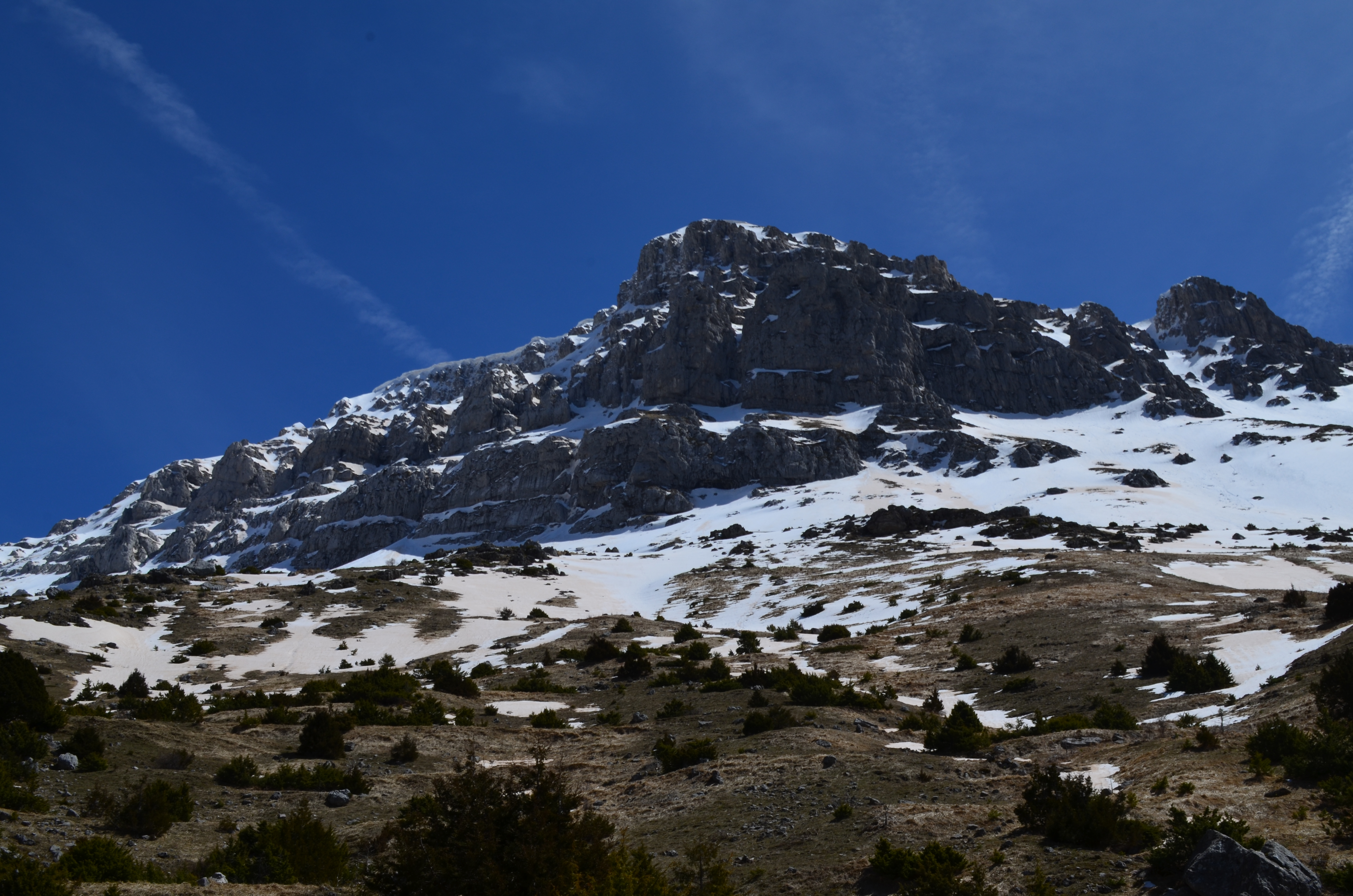
Snowy landscape of Mt. Tymphe

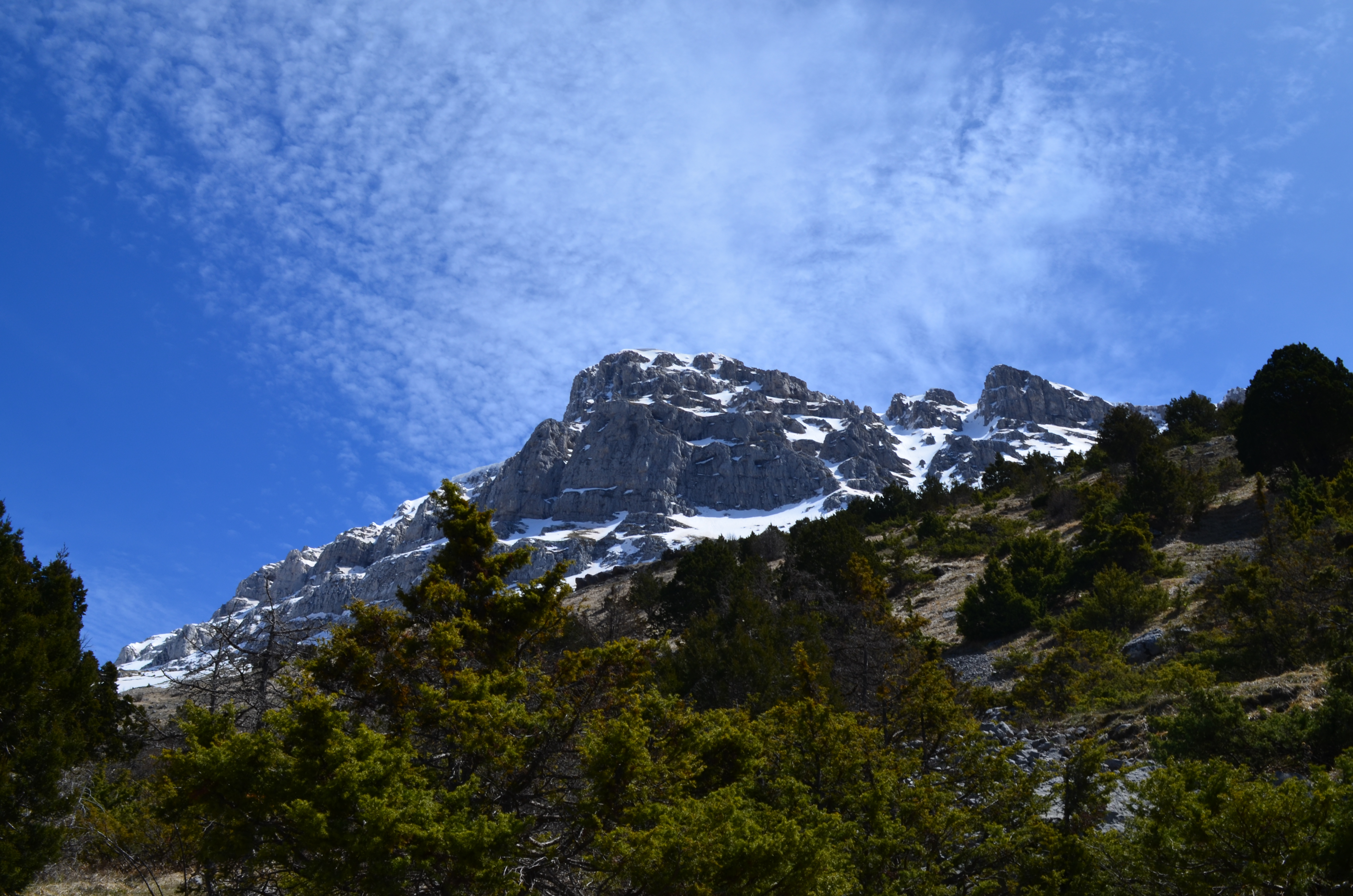
Snowy landscape of Mt. Tymphe

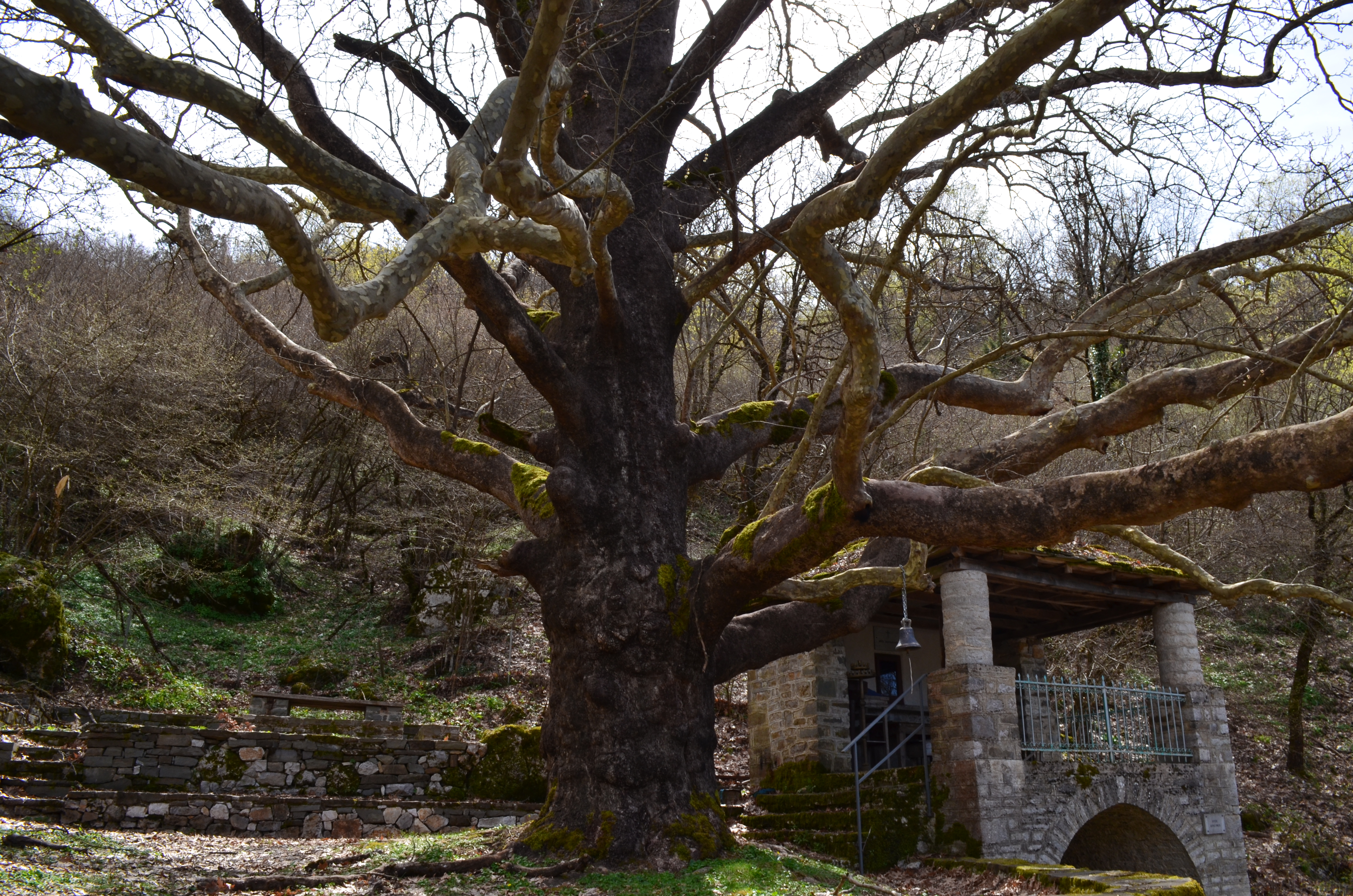
Landscape of Mt. Tymphe

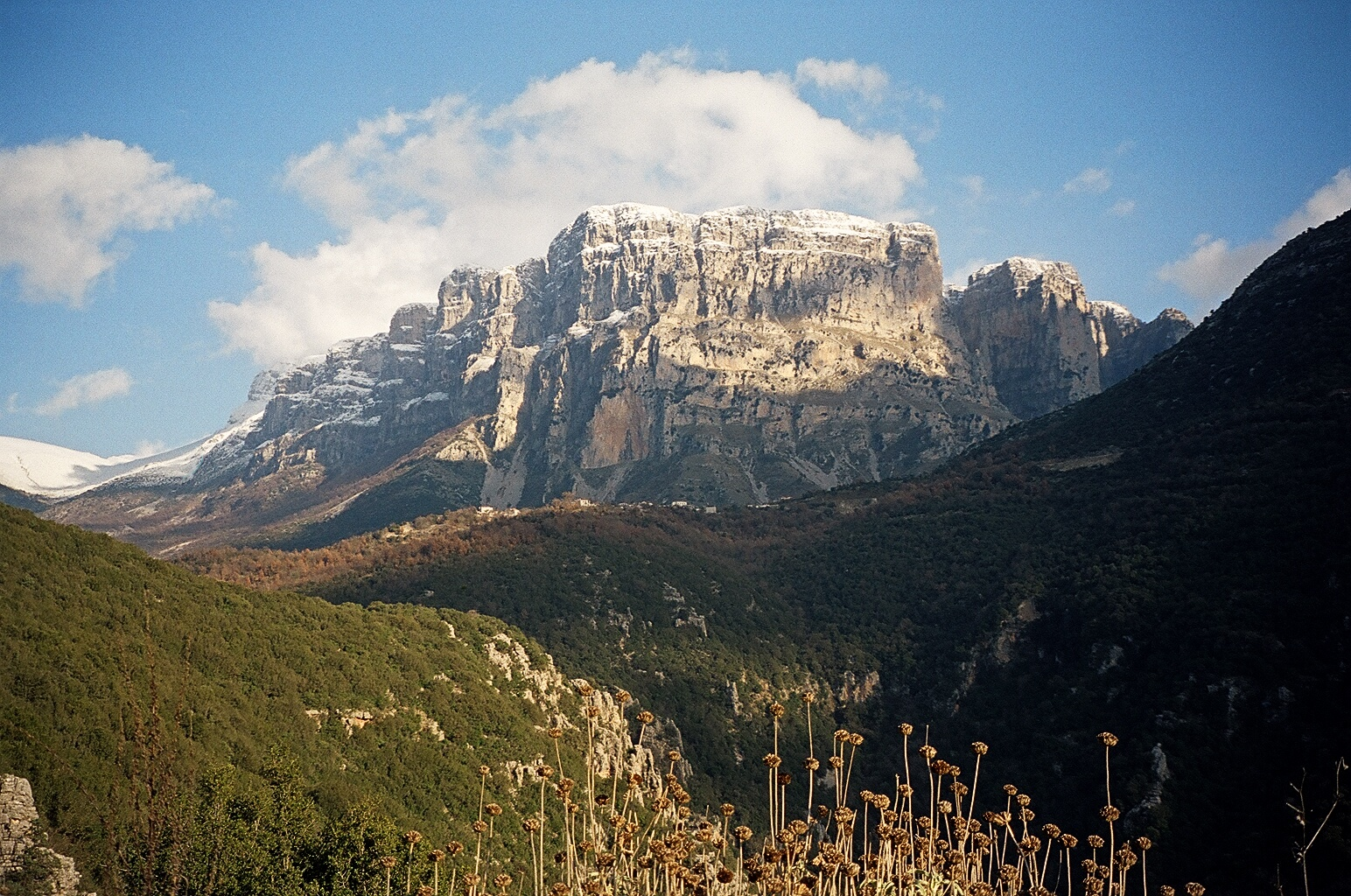
Mt. Tymphe (Gamila peak)

== See also ==
- List of mountains in Greece
- List of mountains by elevation

== Bibliography ==
- Amanatidou, Despoina (2005). "A case study in Vikos-Aoos National Park - Greece" (PDF). University of Freiburg.
- Denoël, Mathieu; Schabetsberger, Robert (2003). "Resource partitioning in two heterochronic populations of Greek Alpine newts, Triturus alpestris veluchiensis". Acta Oecologica. 24: 55–64. doi:10.1016/S1146-609X(03)00043-2. hdl:2268/3029.
- Hughes, P.D.; Gibbard, P.L.; Woodward, J.C. (2003). "Relict rock glaciers as indicators of Mediterranean palaeoclimate during the Last Glacial Maximum (Late Wurmian) in northwest Greece" (PDF). Journal of Quaternary Science. 18 (5): 431–440. doi:10.1002/jqs.764.
- "Natura 2000 Data Form. Site code: GR2130009" (PDF). NATURA 2000. Greek Ministry for the Environment, Physical Planning & Public Works. 2009. Archived from the original (PDF) on 2011-07-16.
- Papadopoulou, Varvara (2008). "Prefecture of Ioannina, Epirus-Greece" (PDF). Prefectural Committee of Tourist Promotion. Archived from the original (PDF) on November 28, 2006.
- Paschos, P.; Nikolaou, E.; Papanikos, D. (2004). Explore the landscape, the rocks and the nature of Vikos-Aoos and surrounding area. Find out its history and civilisation (PDF). Greek Institute of Geology & Mineral Exploration. ISBN 978-960-98903-5-9. Archived from the original (PDF) on 2011-07-21.
- Salmon, Tim; Cullen, Michael (2006). "chapter 6". The Mountains of Greece: Trekking in the Pindhos Mountains (2nd ed.). Cicerone. ISBN 978-1-85284-440-0.
- Woodward, J.C.; Hamlin, R.H.B.; Macklin, M.G.; Hughes, P.D.; Lewin, J. (2008). "Glacial activity and catchment dynamics in northwest Greece: Long-term river behaviour and the slackwater sediment record for the last glacial to interglacial transition". Geomorphology. 101 (1–2): 44–67. doi:10.1016/j.geomorph.2008.05.018.
