= Smolikas =

Mountain in Greece

- Σμόλικας; Smolcu
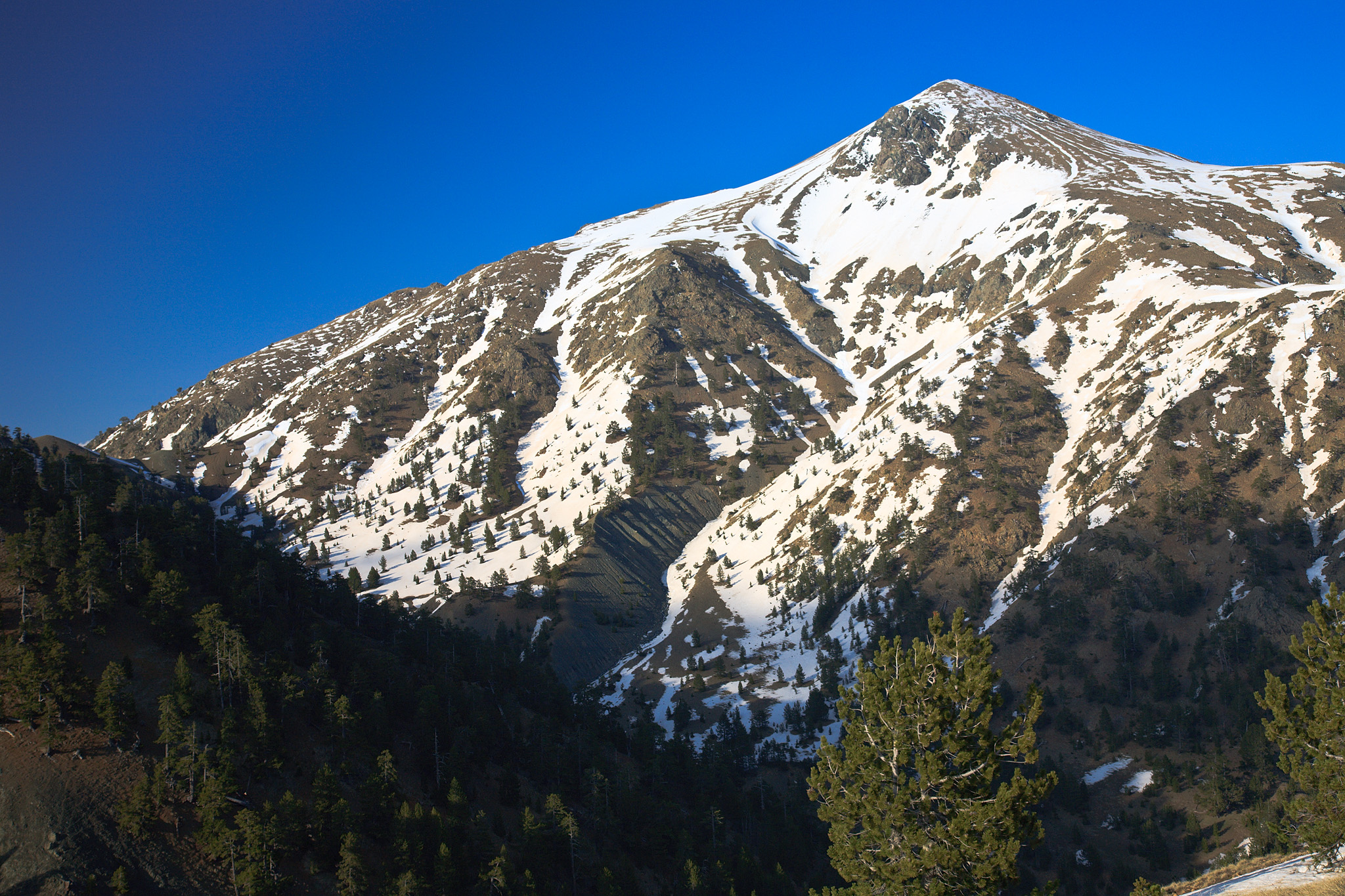
- The Smolikas summit, a view from south

Highest point
- Elevation: 2,631.397 m (8,633.19 ft)
- Prominence: 1,736 m (5,696 ft)
- Listing: Ultra
- Coordinates: 40°05′23″N 20°55′34″E

Geography
- Location within Greece
- Location: Northwest central Greece
- Parent range: Pindus Mountains

Mount Smolikas (Greek: Σμόλικας; Aromanian: Smolcu) is a mountain in the Ioannina regional unit, northwestern Greece. At a height of 2,631.397 metres above sea level, it is the highest of the Pindus Mountains, and the second highest mountain in Greece after Mount Olympus. The mountain consists of ophiolite rocks. During several periods in the Pleistocene the northern and eastern cirques and valleys were glaciated. The last glaciers of this area retreated around 11,500 years ago. It is drained by the river Vjosa to the south, and the river Vourkopotamo (a tributary of the Sarantaporos) to the north. There is a small alpine lake called "Drakolimni Smolika" near the summit, at about 2,200 metres elevation. Nearby mountain ranges are Tymfi to the south, Gramos to the northwest, Vasilitsa to the southeast and Voio to the northeast.

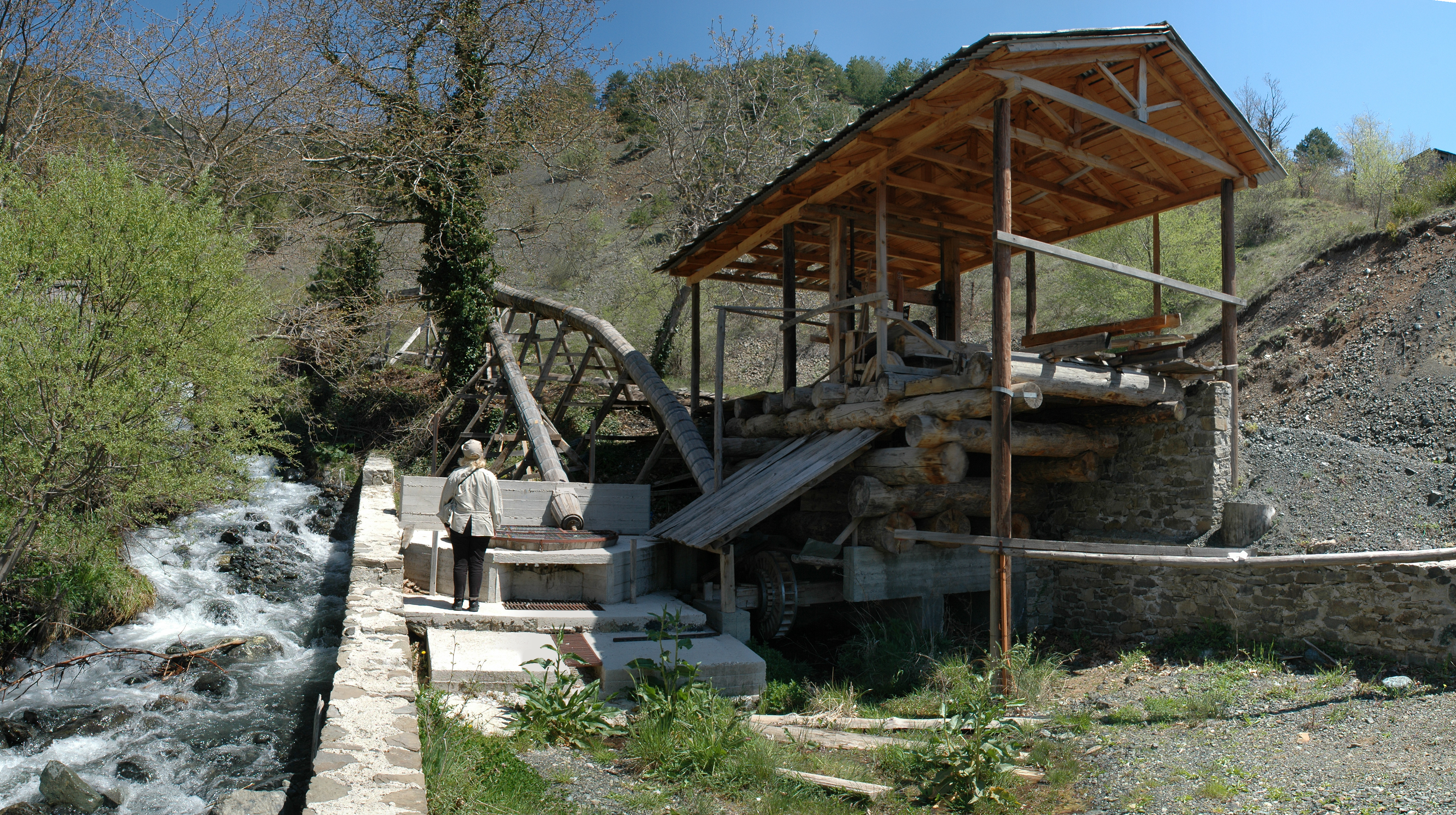
A water powered saw mill at Armata.

The higher elevations, above 2,000 metres, consist of grasslands and rocks, and there are deciduous and conifer forests at lower elevations. The mountain lies completely within the municipality of Konitsa, the main villages around the mountain being Agia Paraskevi to the north, and Palaioselli, Pades and Armata to the south. The town Konitsa lies 15 km southwest of Smolikas. The Greek National Road 20 (Kozani - Siatista - Konitsa - Ioannina) passes west of the mountain.
