= Pindus =

Mountain range in Greece and Albania

- Pindos, Pindhos
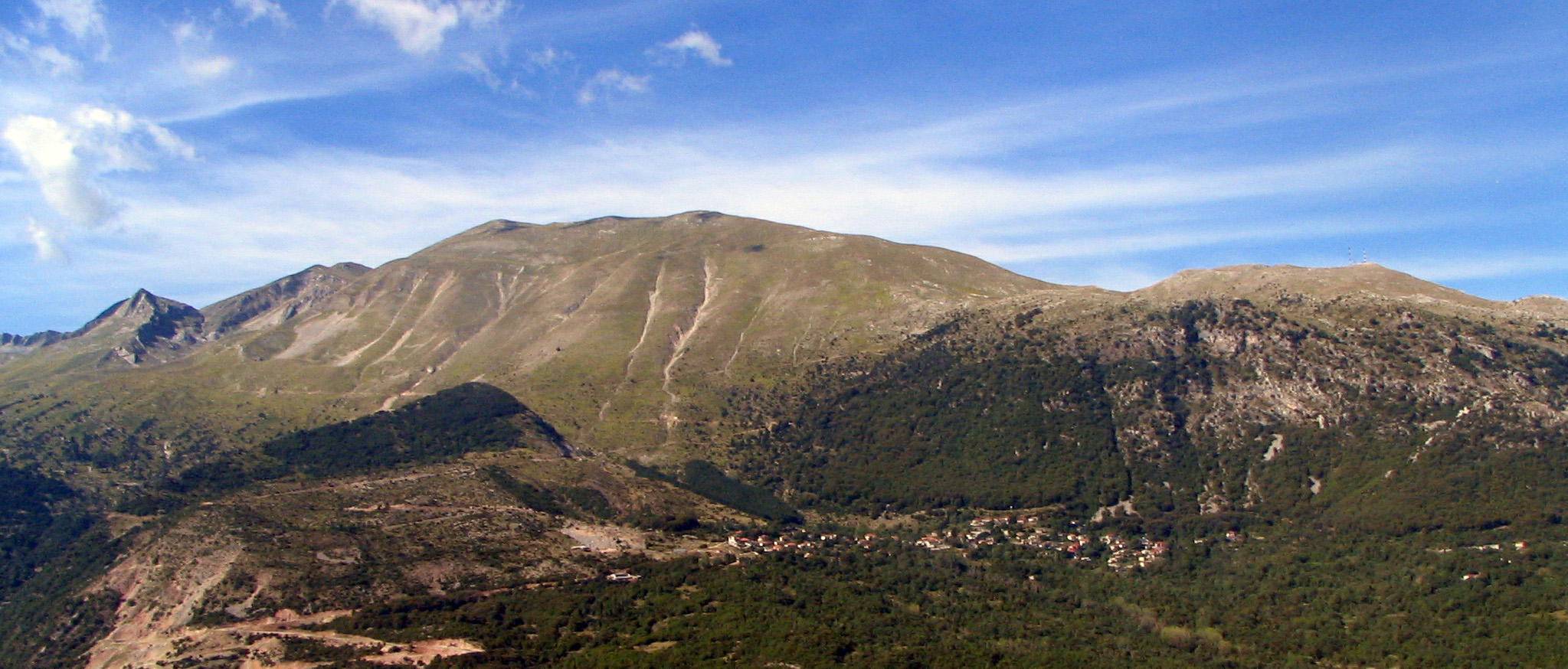
- Pindus in Epirus – The village of Anthochori resting beneath the east face of Kalogiros peak, Lakmos Mountain.

Highest point
- Peak: Smolikas
- Elevation: 2,637 m (8,652 ft)
- Coordinates: 40°05′20″N 20°55′31″E

Dimensions
- Length: 112 mi (180 km) north-south
- Width: 35 mi (56 km)

Naming
- Native name: Πίνδος (Greek); Pindet (Albanian); Pindu (Aromanian)

Geography
- Location within Albania Location within Greece
- Countries: Greece; Albania
- Provinces/Counties: Western Macedonia; Epirus; Thessaly, Central Greece, Korçë County; Gjirokastër County

The Pindus, Pindos or Pindhos (Note: Greek: Πίνδος, romanized: Píndos; Albanian: Pindet; Aromanian: Pindu) is a mountain range located in Northern Greece and Southern Albania. It is roughly 160 km (99 mi) long, with a maximum elevation of 2,637 metres (8,652 ft) (Mount Smolikas). Because it runs north to south along much of mainland Greece, the Pindus range is known colloquially as the spine of Greece. The mountain range stretches from near the Greek-Albanian border in southern Albania, entering the Epirus and Macedonia regions in northern Greece down to the north of the Peloponnese. Geologically, it is an extension of the Dinaric Alps, which dominate the western region of the Balkan Peninsula.

== History of the name ==
According to John Tzetzes (a 12th-century Byzantine writer), the Pindos range was then called Metzovon.

When Anastasios Gordios translated (between 1682/83 and 1689) to a more conversational (colloquial) language the initial praise to St. Vissarion, which was drafted in 1552 by Pahomios Rousanos, he wrote: “A mountain called by the Greeks Pindos is the same mountain which is called Metzovon in Barbarian” and further down the same text he adds “this mountain, Metzovon, separates the Ioannina region from the Thessaloniki region.”

By the eighteenth century, there had been identification of the name Metsovo with the Pindos mountain range (in a French encyclopedia of 1756). BY 1825, the traveller John Cam Hobhouse was writing that "…the latter mountains, now known by the name of Metzovo, can be no other than Pindus itself…" while a patriarchal document of 1818 states: "Because the high mountain of Pindos in Epirus, that is commonly called Messovon...". The word Pindos was used more in literary sources, while the folk name for the mountain range from the Middle Ages up to the 19th century was either "Metsovo" or "the mountains of Metsovo". Most probably this name was not meant to indicate the whole range as it is meant today, but only its central part between the area of Aspropotamos and the springs of the Aoös River. This part coincides with the mountainous region which the ancient Greeks used to call Pindos.

== Major mountains ==
The most notable mountains in the range are Mount Gramos, Mount Smolikas, Mount Vasilitsa, Tymfi or Gamila, Lakmos or Peristeri, the Athamanika or Tzoumerka mountains, Vardousia, and the Agrafa mountains. Some mountains in Southern Greece are also considered part of the extended Pindus range. Its highest peak is on Mount Smolikas at an altitude of 2,637 meters.

== Population ==
The main groups of Pindus are Epirotes, Roumeliotes, and Vlachs. There are many villages in the Pindus, one of them being Samarina, which boasts one of the highest elevations in Greece. The area had a traditional pastoral economy in which sheep were raised by shepherds who were ethnically Sarakatsani and Aromanian. Many of the villages, such as Perivoli and Smixi, include communities of Aromanians (Vlachs), originally shepherds and farmers. In recent decades, a number of villages, such as Metsovo, have developed into tourist resorts with ski facilities.

== Transportation ==
The A2 motorway (Egnatia Odos) serves the region and connects it with the rest of Greece.

== Sightseeing ==
Besides the imposing mountainous terrain of the range, two significant gorges in Europe are located in the area: the Vikos Gorge and the Aoos Gorge. Together with the mountain valley of Valia Kalda they have been declared protected regions and constitute the National Park of Northern Pindos. Furthermore, many mountain settlements with long history and unique architecture are located throughout the range.

== Nature and wildlife ==
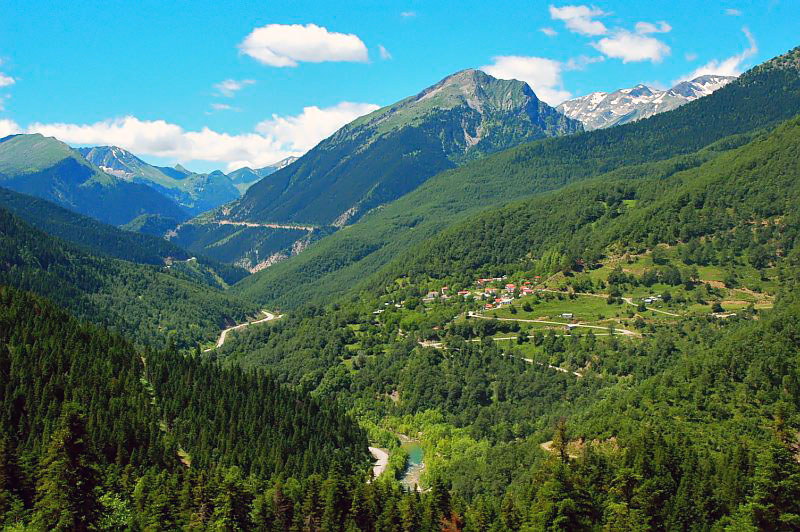
Aspropotamos valley and Milia village in Trikala regional unit

The Pindus region covers a wide range of elevations and habitats, from deep canyons to steep mountains. The wide range in altitude results in two major forest zones:

- A conifer zone, where trees such as a subspecies of Austrian Pine and the endemic Greek fir, characterise the highest elevations, with juniper woodlands dominating near the timberline.
- A mixed broadleaf forest zone dominates the valleys and canyons of the middle and lower elevations.

Large breeding colonies of herons, spoonbills, egrets, and pelicans fish the waters of the mountain lakes of the Pindus. This is one of the few areas in Europe where the rare Dalmatian pelican can be found. Wolves, jackals, and bears are found in the forests.

=== Ecology ===
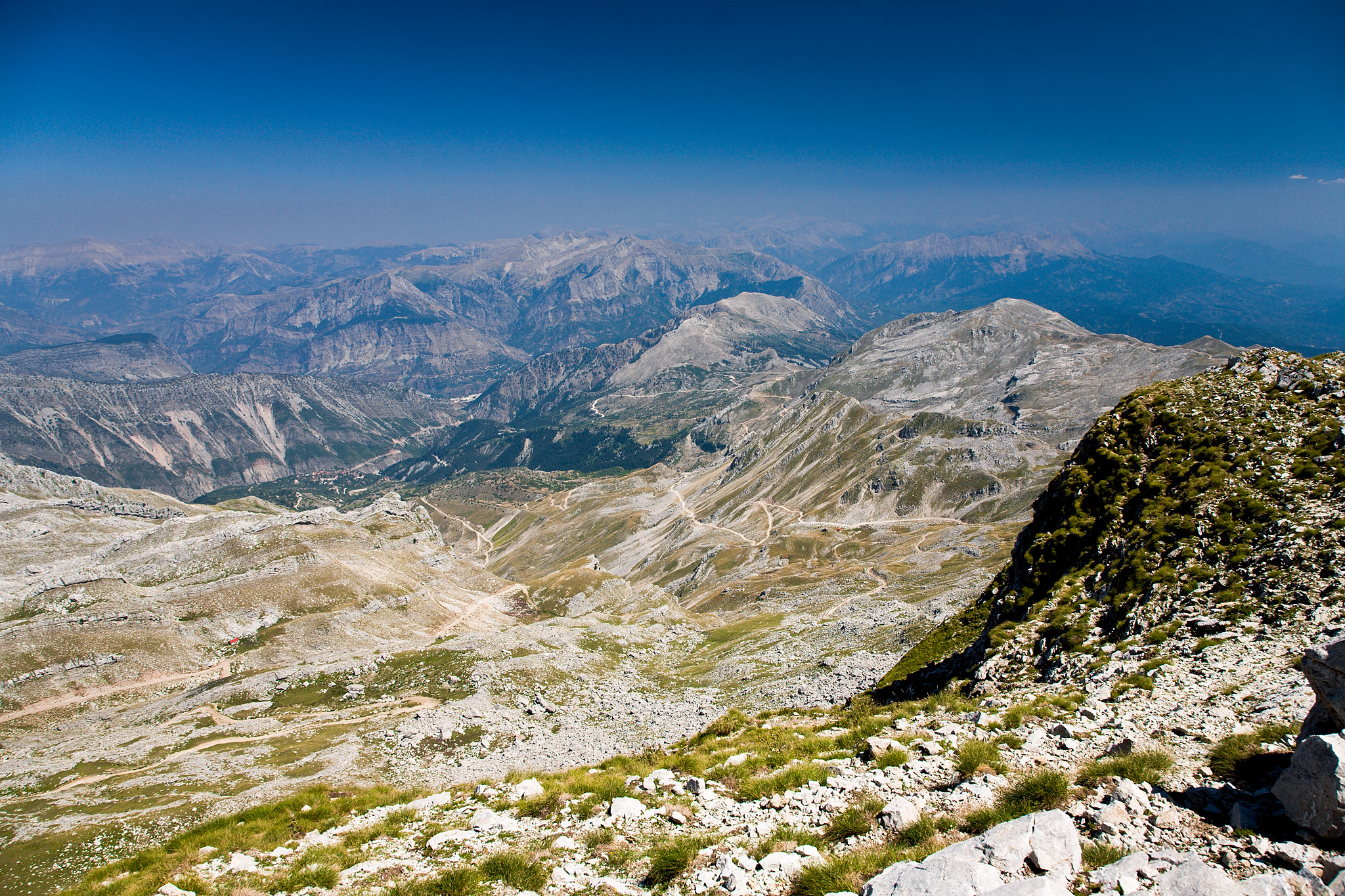
Parts of Southern Pindus

The forests of this region have faced many threats over the course of human history, including overgrazing, agriculture, and deforestation. The greatest threats now come from the development of mountain tourism and ski resorts. Because of the instability of the soil on steep mountains, road-building and clear-cutting operations have led to dangerous landslides and the collapse of mountain slopes. Mining for bauxite, overgrazing, and over-collection of plants are also threatening the great biodiversity of this ecoregion.

== National Parks ==
In the Albanian section of the Pindus mountains is Albania's newest national park.

=== Vjosa Wild River National Park ===
The Vjosa River is Europe's first Wild River National Park that was designated on 15 March 2023. The river valley is considered Albania's biodiversity hotspot, offering ideal aquatic habitats for over 1,100 species of wildlife, including otters, the endangered Egyptian vulture and the critically endangered Balkan lynx, of which only 15 are estimated to remain.

In the Greek section of the Pindus mountains there are two national parks.

=== Vikos-Aoos National Park ===
The Vikos-Aoos National Park is south of the town of Konitsa, in the west part of Zagori region. It includes Mount Tymfi, the Vikos Gorge and the Aoos Gorge. It was created in 1973.

=== Pindus National Park ===
The Pindus National Park (also known as Valia Kalda) is in a remote area in the northeast of the Pindus mountains, north of the town of Metsovo and south of Perivoli. The park of some 7,000 hectares was established in 1966. There are forests of black pine and beech, and in the higher parts, Bosnian Pine (Pinus leucodermis). The park is a refuge for bears, wild cats, and lynxes.

Black Pine Trees commemorative coin

The National Park was selected as main motif for two high value euro collectors' coins: the €10 Greek Birds and Flowers and Black Pine Trees commemorative coins, minted in 2007. On the obverse of the latter there is a panoramic view of the common black pine trees that are prevalent in the park.

== Trivia ==
- The mountain's name is used in East Slavic languages (Note: Belarusian: піндос, Russian: пиндос, Ukrainian: піндос, пендос) as a slur word describing Americans (in general or white people).

== See also ==
- Agrafa
- Battle of Pindus
- Mount Smolikas
- Vardousia
- Athanasios Diakos, Greece
- Metsovo

== Sources ==
- N. Hammond, Epirus, vol. A΄, transl. Athanasiou Giagka, publ. Epirotiki Vivliothiki, Athens 1971, pp. 12–13.
- F. Dasoulas, “Pindos, oi geografikes kai istorikes diastaseis enos onomatos” [Pindos, the geographical and historic dimensions of a name], Epirotiko Imerologio 31 (2012), pp. 189–254
- K. Tsipiras, Oreini Ellada [Mountainous Greece], publ. Kedros S.A., 2003, pp. 14–61
- N. Kosmas, “Oi diodoi tis Pindou” [The passages of Pindos], Epirotiki Estia 4 (1955), pp. 14–20.
- N. Pihtos, H aisthitiki tis Pindou [The aesthetics of Pindos], publ. City of Metsovo, Ioannina 1988.
- B. Nitsiakos, Oi oreines koinotites tis voreias Pindou. Ston apoiho tis makras diarkeias [The mountainous settlements of Northern Pindos. Long term echoes], publ. Plethron, Athens 1995.
