= Bridge of Petsios (Iliochori) =

Bridge in Iliochori, northern Greece

Bridge of Petsos Γεφύρι Του Πέτσου
- Coordinates: 39°58′50″N 20°54′38″E
- Carries: Pedestrians
- Locale: Iliochori, Epirus Greece

Characteristics
- Material: Brick and Stone
- Total length: 23.70 meters
- Width: 2,20 meters
- Height: 844

History
- Designer: Antonis Petsou
- Constructed by: Antonis Petsou
- Construction start: 1880
- Construction end: 1887
- Closed: 1967
- Replaces: 2005

The Bridge of Petsos (Greek: Γεφύρι Του Πέτσου) is a single-arch stone bridge located in Iliochori.

== Description ==
It is a single-arch bridge that spans the 'Great Stream', a tributary of the Resitis River. The bridge is in an altitude of 844 m, on the trail to Laista. It crosses the Megalo Rema (Big flow) which flows into the Rasianitis, a tributary of the Aoos River.

Following the marked path from the village square of Iliochori, you come across the stone bridge of Petsos, which leads to the impressive waterfalls of Balta of Striga, after an easy 30 minute walk.

== History ==
Nikolaos Exarchos, in his book "A Nobrinovo," mentions 1880 as the date of its construction, while an inscription near the bridge later mentions 1887. The cost of its construction was covered by a donation from the family of Antonis Petsou.

In the spring earthquake of 1967, the bridge suffered severe damage, which was quickly repaired. Maintenance work was also carried out in the summer of 2005, and today the bridge is in very good condition.

== See also ==
- Bridges in Greece
- Balta of Striga
- Iliochori
