= Drakolimni =

Name of several lakes in northwestern Greece

Coordinates: 39°59′38.84″N 20°47′12.31″E

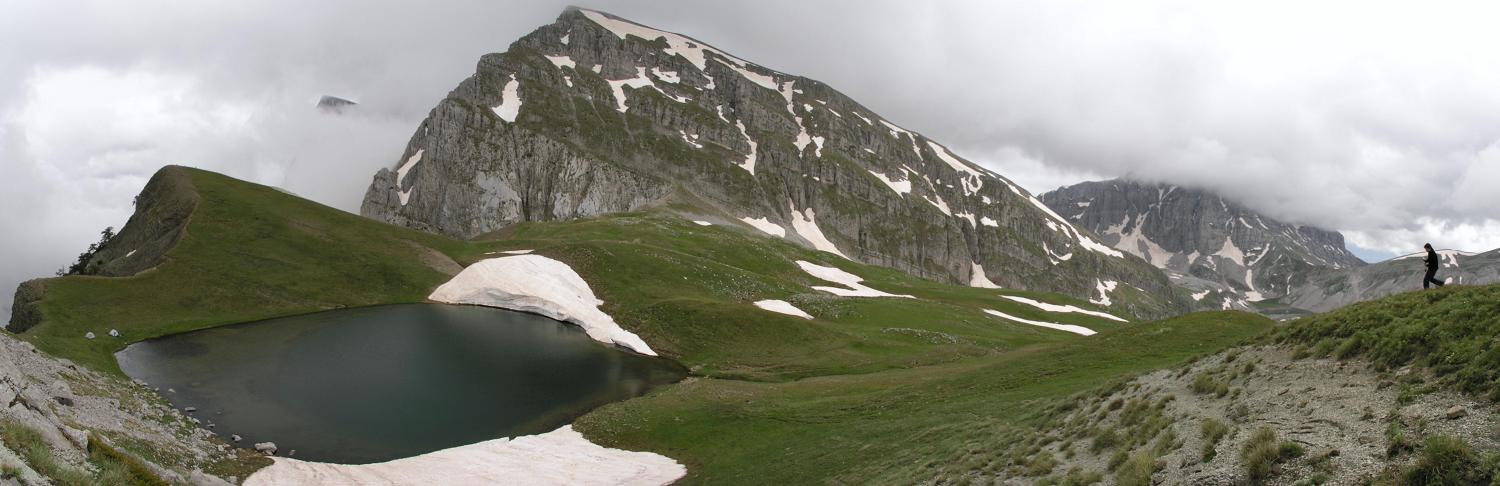
Panoramic image of Drakolimni of Tymfi, with Ploskos peak (center) and Astraka peak (right)

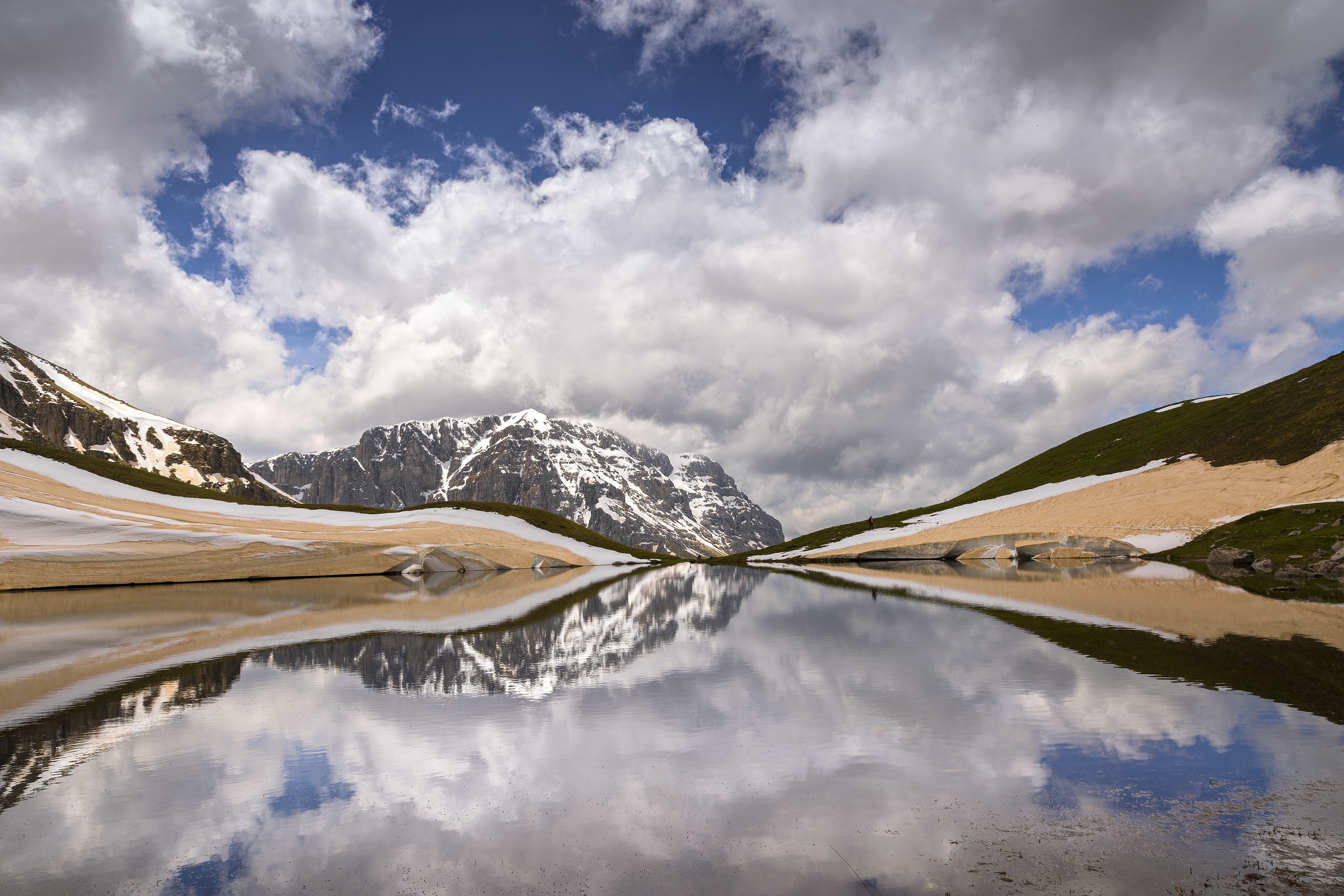

Drakolimni (Greek: Δρακόλιμνη, "Dragon Lake") is the name of several alpine or sub-alpine lakes in northwestern Greece Epirus region: the ones in mountain Tymfi and Smolikas are the most widely known. According to local folktales the lakes used to be inhabited by dragons who fought each other by throwing pines and rocks and thus created the peculiar landscape and gave their names to the lakes.

== Drakolimni of Tymfi ==
The first lake resides at an altitude of 2050 m above sea level, on the mountain range of Tymfi, in Vikos–Aoös National Park. It is overlooked by the nearby peaks of Ploskos (Greek: Πλόσκος) and Astraka (Greek: Αστράκα). At a 5-hour walking distance from the village of Papingo, the lake is a popular trekking destination in the Vikos–Aoös National Park. The lake is inhabited by a species of alpine newt.

== Drakolimni of Smolikas ==
The second lake resides on the west slope of Smolikas, the second highest mountain in Greece. Smolikas lies a few kilometers north of Tymfi, only separated by the gorge of the river Aoos. This lake is also inhabited by alpine newt.
