= Balta of Striga (Iliochori) =

Large tufa cascade on the Kryopotamos River

- Μπάλτα Ντι Στρίγκα
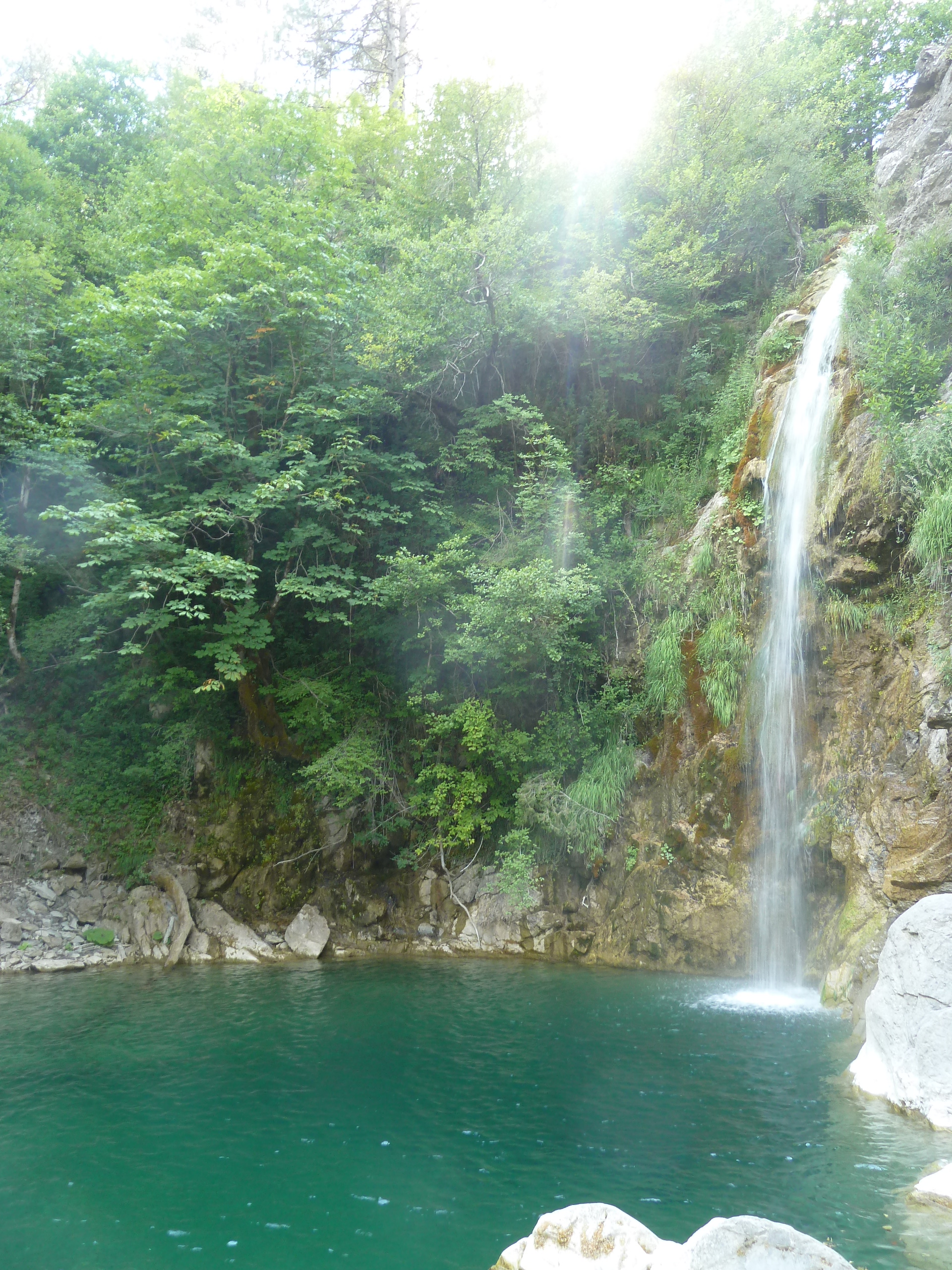
- A view of the Balta of Striga falls

- Location within Greece
- Location: Iliochori, Greece
- Coordinates: 39.5883°N 20.5451°E
- Type: Segmented
- Total height: 970 metres (3,180 ft)
- Number of drops: 3
- Total width: 120 metres (390 ft)
- Watercourse: Kryopotamos

Balta of Striga (Greek: Μπάλτα Ντι Στρίγκα) is a large tufa cascade on the Kryopotamos River, in the karstic heartland of northwest in Greece in the village of Iliochori. It is 70 kilometres (43 mi) northwest of Ioannina and 2 kilometres (1.2 mi) south of Iliochori.

== Location ==
They are located just outside Iliochori, and you can reach them through a beautiful walking trail of moderate difficulty, which starts from the town square and is literally immersed in greenery and pure oxygen. These are three consecutive waterfalls in the heart of the virgin forest, the largest of which is 25 meters high, forming two green natural pools with crystal clear waters.

== Description ==
Its height is about 970 metres (3,180 ft) and the radius of the lake in the base of the waterfall is 120 metres (390 ft). "Balta of Striga' in Vlach means the small lake of the scream. Balta of Striga popular swimming and picnic area and, during the summer, it is frequently visited by tourists. It is a complex of three waterfalls, at an altitude of about 780 meters, of which the largest exceeds 25 meters in height. Between them and inside the rocks are formed the oviras, or puddles created by the rushing and frozen waters of Kryopotamos. The triple waterfall named after the scream of a woman who killed herself for her lover

== See also ==
- List of waterfalls
- Bridge of Petsios
- Iliochori
