= Vasilica =

Vasilica (Cyrillic: Василица) may refer to:

- Vasilica (holiday)
- Vasilica (bread)

== See also ==
- Vasilitsa, mountain in Greece
