= Iliochori =

Iliochori Ηλιοχώρι (Greek) Dubrinovo (Aromanian)
- Community
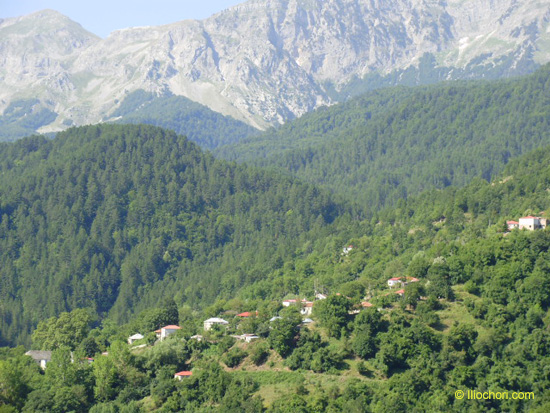
- Iliochori View from the Church of Prophet Elia

- Location within Greece
- Coordinates: 39°58.83′N 20°54.51′E
- Country: Greece
- Administrative region: Epirus
- Regional unit: Ioannina
- Municipality: Zagori
- Municipal unit: Tymfi
- Elevation: 920 m (3,020 ft)

Population (2021)
  - Community: 35
- Time zone: UTC+2 (EET)
  - Summer (DST): UTC+3 (EEST)
- Postal code: 440 10
- Area code: +30-26530
- Website: https://www.iliochori.com/

Iliochori (Greek: Ηλιοχώρι, before 1927: Δοβρίνοβον, Dovrinovon; Aromanian: Dubrinovo) is a village located in the municipal unit of Tymfi, regional unit of Ioannina, Greece. It is located in the northern part of the Zagori region.

According to a local legend, the village was founded as Rasciana, on the river of the same name. However, that site was abandoned because of a lack of drinking water, and the inhabitants scattered to found Iliochori and the nearby town of Laista. Iliochori was traditionally an agricultural village, with husbandry and cultivation of barley and vetch being among its primary areas of economic activity. Viticulture was also prominent and the village produced a wine. Caravans leaving from Iliochori carried products from the region to the Balkans for trade. The town suffered severe damage in both World War II and the Greek Civil War and lost a large portion of its population during the 1940s as a result.

== Name ==
The linguist Max Vasmer stated the toponym is formed from the Slavic term Dobrin and the Slavic suffix -ovo. The personal name Dobrin is etymologically derived from the Slavic adjective dobъr, meaning 'good', and the suffix -inъ, used to form personal names.

== History ==
=== Origin ===
The origin of the town is not completely clear. From some historical findings it seems that in the 11th century BC, the local inhabitants formed several small isolated communities, at the sites of Rascianà, Lipochori, Koukourounzu and Souri. Later on, probably for several reasons including drinkable water, the inhabitants abandoned the place and constructed the town in the actual "Dobrinovo". That Slavic name, of the AD 14th century, means "Dobri+novo" ("good + new"). However, not all the inhabitants moved to Iliochori. Some of them settled in Laista (14 km or 9 miles away) that in this period was called Lisinitza. During the period of the Slavic hegemony in the Epirus (AD 6th-7th century), the town of Dobrinovo already existed, as it turns out from the Slavic evidences.

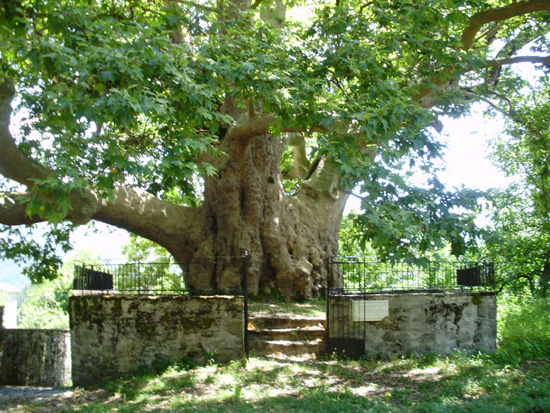
Platanus of Iliochori in the square Mesochori

In the 14th century, the Monastery of Panaghia was constructed. In 1431, as the "Vrisochoritan" Nikolaos Exarchos reports in his book To Ntombrinovo, the Turkish administration counts 1180 inhabitants. In the following years, it kept developing either as more inhabitants or as increased prosperity. Evidence shows the existence of a document that contained a convention made with a doctor of Pades in order to offer medical assistance. The convention that in the period of one year established that the municipality of Dobrinovo would have paid only the wage to the doctor in order to offer free medical attendance to the inhabitants, who have only paid for the medicines. The documents were signed in 1616, but they were destroyed with the fire of the municipality by the Nazis in 1943.

In 1812, the French consul Pouqueville visited the region and reported that in the town of Dobrinovo, he found 750 inhabitants. After few years, since 1815 in Dobrinovo, there was a continuation of Greek schools. Lessons took place in the Monastery of Panaghia and later in some private houses. During the year there happened the first great destruction of the community of the inhabitants caused by bubonic plague disease. The town had numerous victims, and the inhabitants sheltered themselves in the mountains in order to escape from the disease.

In 1819 the Metropolita of Ioannina Gabriel visited the communities which suffered from the disease, and in the town he met 160 inhabitants. In a letter of Ath. Psalidis dated 12-2-1823, sent to Movrokordatos, he described the situation of the Epirus and Thessaly, under the Turkish occupation, showing an armed struggle for liberation. It reports that in the town of Dobrinovo where people live, they were able to carry weapons. The town of Dobrinovo in that period used the school separated for the boys and the girls and was constructed using the aqueduct that brought water to the town and bridges that opened new roads. The inhabitants of Dobrinovo travelled a lot and became traders, but they did not forget their town and they contributed for its development. The Greek newspaper published in Constantinopolis, speaks about 1200 inhabitants in the town of Dobrinovo. Unfortunately for the town, there followed a period of economic decadence. The Balkan wars in 1912, then the First World War, blocked the trade activities that the Iliochorites had created with the countries like Bulgaria, Serbia, Montenegro, until Russia. Later with the arrival of the Spanish flu pulled down on all the towns including Dobrinovo (Iliochori) with numerous victims.

=== Under Ottoman rule ===
From 1463 until 1912, Iliochori was under Ottoman rule, who had granted to all the towns of Zagoria a governmental autonomy with the payment of taxes. The town grew rich with the maximum development between 1870 and 1900.

From 1916 the population was decimated by "Asian flu". The inhabitants of Iliochori lived by breeding sheep and cows, and agriculture, cultivating grain, barley and vetch. They dedicated great care also to viticulture, producing a good wine. However, they were also traders, and in the spring left in caravan with mules and horses, carrying of the goods that they above all sold in the countries of the Balkans, where many had constructed true and economic fortunes. They came back to Iliochori at the end of autumn, to spend the winter with their families. In the winter months, the shepherds were dedicated to the handicrafts, forming itinerant guilds of masons and sculptors in wood that traveled the Balkans selling their goods.

Until 1914 in Iliochori there was the school of the chassis situated over the road of the current city hall, where the girls learned to weave. The building belonged to the Gianussi family that had donated it to the city council; beyond the weaving school there were the elementary school, the primary and secondary schools that were found in the same building. In these schools, there were female teachers for the girls and male teachers for the boys. In 1912 the building was burnt, and in 1924 started its reconstruction, which was finished in 1927. The first master was Papasisis.

=== Second World War and name change ===
After the 1920 the houses inhabited were 160.

During the Second World War, the Germans arrived at Iliochori in 1943 and burnt a large part of the houses of the town. In 1944 another battalion of German entered the town, searching carefully without damaging it.

The town has endured large damages during the Greek Civil War from 1946 to 1949 and many inhabitants emigrated. Till World War II, most Iliochorians used to emigrate mainly to Thessaly. Outside Greece, Iliochorians used to emigrate to Bulgaria, Wallachia and the U.S. Seems that in 1972, there was filmed an old Greek movie Oi Xenitemenoi.

=== From 1990 to 2010 ===
From 1990 many original inhabitants of the place, coming from several parts, Athens, Thessaloniki, Ioannina, Larissa and also from Italy, had begun to repopulate and re-evaluate the town, constructing new houses. In the period, many initiatives of building reconstruction were started, like the renovation of the church of Aghios Nikolaos. In 1992 was completed the portion of the road from the locality Gyftokampos to Iliochori, allowing a fast connection to the village. Always in this period, there was a small committee for the creation of the tourist attraction like waterfall of "Balta Stringa", in the locality Rascianà that attracts visitors also from France.

In 2002, the first website was launched in English and Italian and later became also in French, Spanish and later in Greek version. In 2008 another website in the Greek language was launched, becoming the first village of Zagori in 2009 with two official websites. The door of the church of Aghios Minas had been replaced with a new one in the summer 2009 by the donation of countryman Georgios Polimeris. In October 2009, SKY TV set up a documentary in the waterfall of "Balta Stringa" and around Iliochori. In 2010, after many years on the initiative of the Cultural Association Iliochori, "The Ntomprinovo" revived, successfully, the reunion of Iliochoriton everywhere in lakes of the pit.

=== Recent history ===
In 2010, Iliochori began to participate in social media, with a presence on Facebook, Twitter, YouTube, Vimeo, and Instagram, to share news and videos in real time and connect all the inhabitants and iliochorites who live outside or abroad.

== Local main events - Panigyri ==
Each 20 July is a holiday in honour of the prophet Elia, the patron saint of Iliochori.

On the evening of 19 July. At the center of the square, the Iliochoriti start the traditional dances of the Epirus, and in particular of the region of Zagori, with the music of the orchestra.

On the morning of 20 July, the faithful fill the road from the town to the church of the prophet Elia. At the end of the function, they go to the houses of the people that celebrate the name day for the wishes. That same evening, on the main square of the town there are again the traditional dances until the first light of the morning.

This holiday is an occasion for many people, originally from this place but living far away, to go back to Iliochori. The holiday attracts many visitors from the towns, eager to taste typical dishes and wines of the region of Zagori.

== Location and climate ==
The village is located in the municipality of Tymfi, in the northern part of the Ioannina prefecture at 71 kilometres (44 mi) from Ioannina, after the locality Gyftokampos. Iliochori is surrounded by conifer forests and rivers at the foothills of Gamila of the Tymphis mountain range, and borders the Vikos–Aoös National Park. It is built on a steep slope between very tall trees in a green area, with much running water and stone bridges. The village of Iliochori also has a small post office and a small school with a nice square re-made as a plaka. Every year during the panegyri of Prophet Elia, it has been used gather and celebrate the feast.

== Demographics ==
Iliochori has an Aromanian population and is an Aromanian speaking village. The village forms an Aromanian dialect cluster with the villages of Laista and Vrysochori (Lesnitsa) whose spoken Aromanian differs from other Aromanian speaking villages of the wider area due to some distinct linguistic features. In the early 21st century, elderly people were bilingual in the community language and Greek, whereas younger residents under 40 might have understood the community language but did not use it. Some Sarakatsani settled in the village during the early 20th century. The Sarakatsani are Greek speakers.

== Transportation ==
=== Roads ===
The village of Iliochori is frequently connected from Ioannina by the transit communications company KTEL (Greece). From the other main Greek cities, like Athens and Thessaloniki, the A2 motorway (Egnatia Odos) passes by Ioannina.

=== Airports ===
The closer airport is the Ioannina National Airport, going out from Ioannina in the direction of Konitsa. After 19 km (12 mi) on the right, there is the cross-roads that after 50 km (31 mi) will bring to the town of Iliochori.

=== Ports ===
The Port of Igoumenitsa is the closest seaport to reach the village of Iliochori located in the city of Igoumenitsa 149.3 km, reachable in 2 hours 34 minutes, through the Egnatia motorway .

== Tourism ==
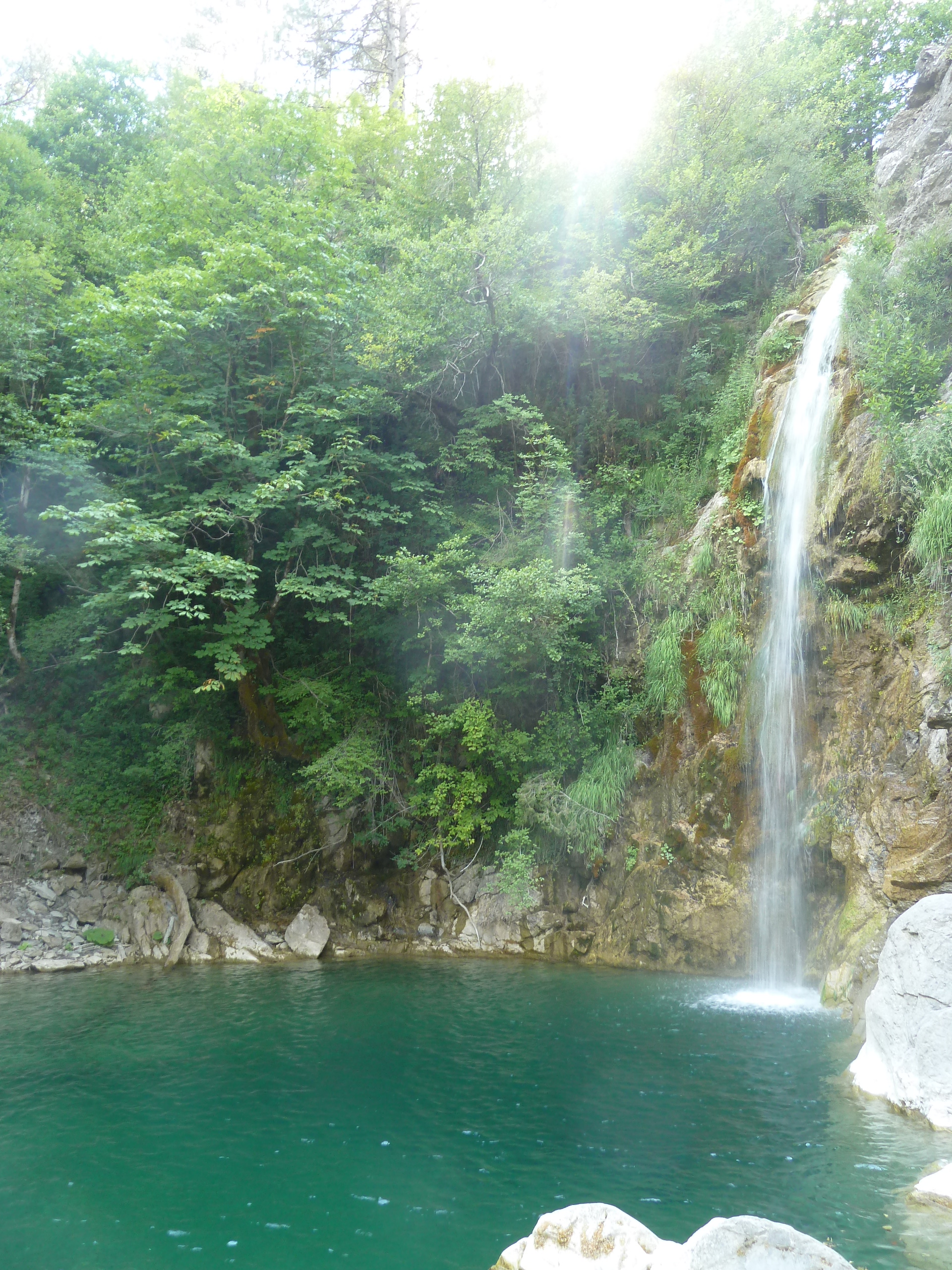
Waterfalls "Balta Stringa" in Iliochori

- From Iliochori, following the path built by the Iliochorites (inhabitants of Iliochori), after 2 km in locality "Balta Stringa" are three great waterfalls, the largest of which is 25 m (82 ft) high. In October 2009, one of the television stations of Ioannina shot a documentary about this main attraction and in the village.
- In locality Gyftokampos, every year, on the first weekend of August, the descendants of the ancient tribe of Sarachazani, great breeders, congregate for a great festivity that begins on Friday afternoon. They come from Greece, Romania, Bulgaria and elsewhere in the Balkans. On their arrival they set up the tents and light large bonfires for the preparation of the roasts and in order to warm themselves because at night, the temperature goes down.
- Another sight is the Rascianitis river that flows in the valley of the town, where one can go fishing.
- The Bridge of Petsos in stone probably laughet to the period is the Ottoman Empire and has become also one turist attraction.

== In popular culture ==
- The 1990 movie "Η τελευταία αρκούδα του Πίνδου" ("The Last Bear of Pindos") was about a migrant from Iliochori, returning from Stuttgart (Germany) to his home village.

== Population ==
Year	Community population
1812	350
1856	370
1868	700
1874	700
1902	694
1913	420
1928	164
1940	132
1951	52
1961	75
1971	49
1981	67
1991	66
2001	40
2011	31

== Notable Iliochorites ==
- Iraklis Retos, named Mayor in Trikala from June 1946 until August 1950.
- Nikolaos Bellos from Iliochori in Zagori, died in Ioannina in 1948; he was one of the benefactors of Ioannina.
- Giorgios Mellis "Official Knight of the Order to the Merit of the Italian Republic"

== Bibliography ==
- Νικόλαος Έξαρχος (1990). Το Ντομπρίνοβο (in Greek). Greece.

== Gallery ==
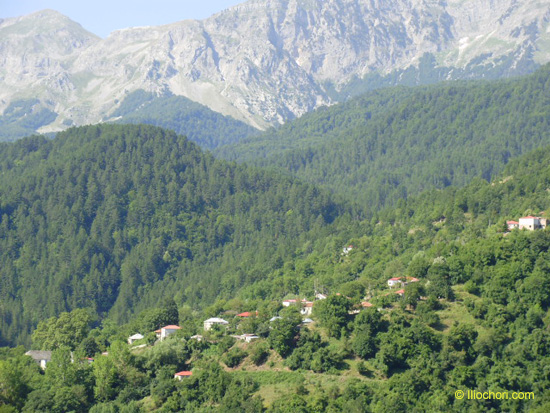
Iliochori View from the Church of Prophet Elia

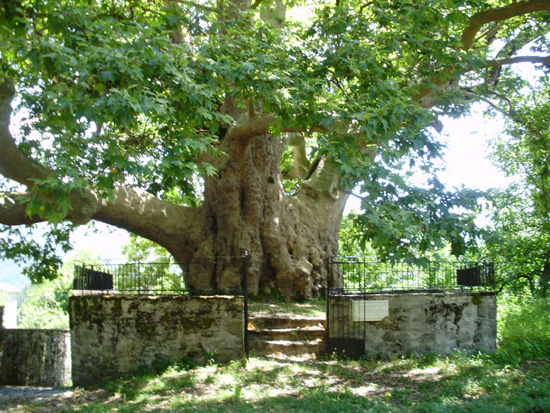
Platanus of Iliochori in Mesochori's square

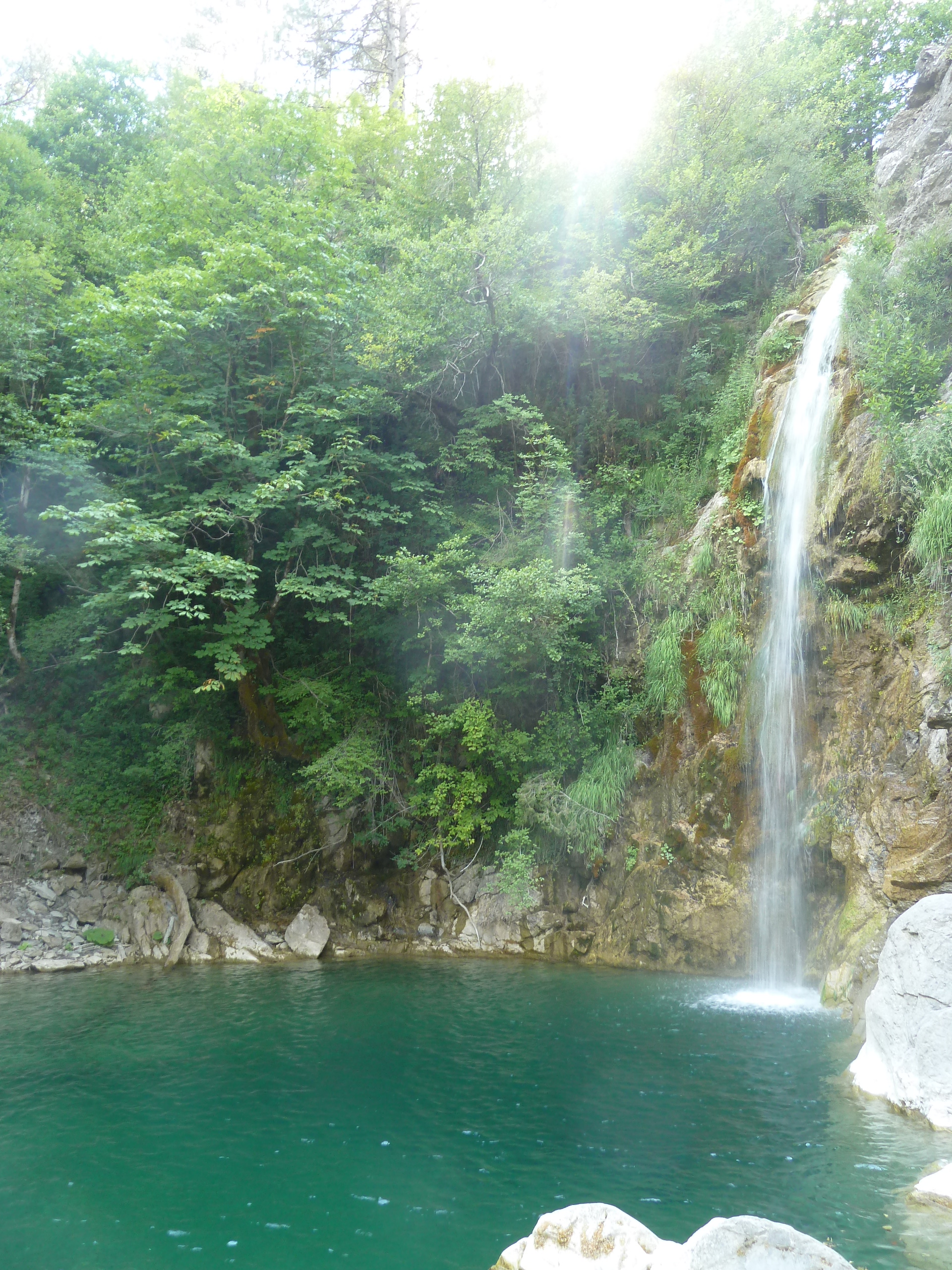
Waterfalls "Balta Stringa" in Iliochori

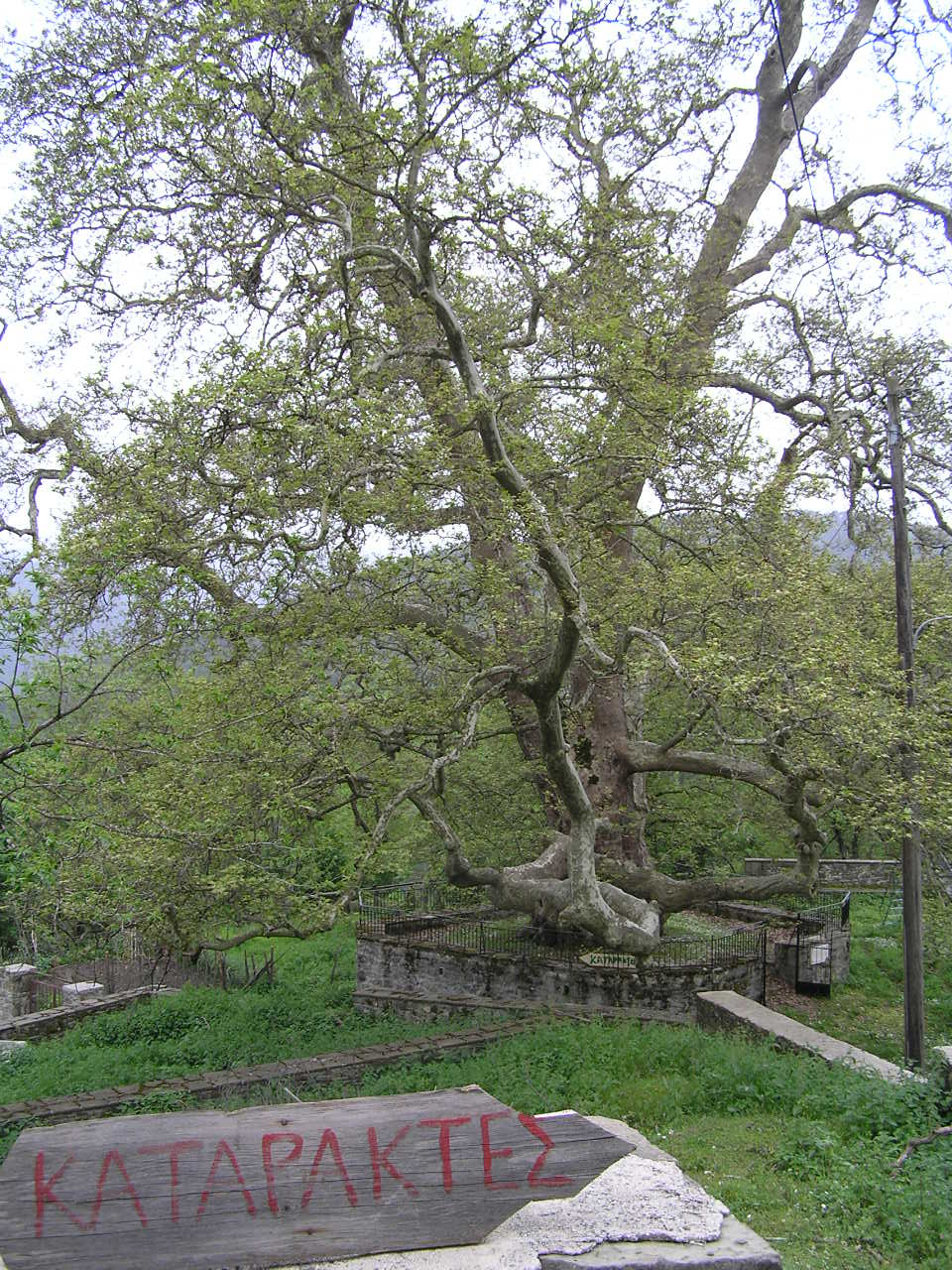
Platanus of Iliochori in Mesochori's square

== See also ==
- Balta of Striga
- Bridge of Petsios
- Zagori
- Epirus
