= Vasilitsa =

Ski resort in the Pindus mountains, Greece

Coordinates: 40.0597°N 21.1998°E

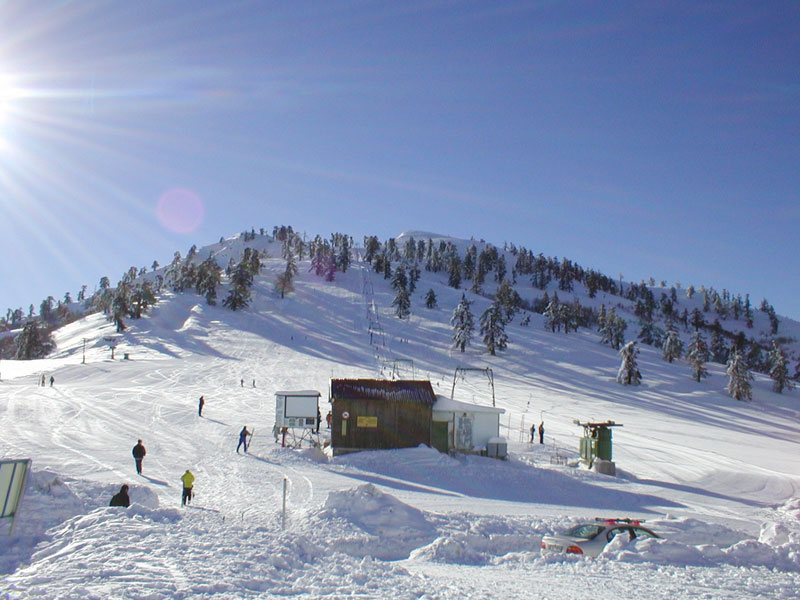
Vasilitsa - Elimeia

Vasilitsa is a ski resort in Greece. The ski center is located in the middle of Pindos (40.033N, 21.083E), approximately 42km away from Grevena and 417km from Athens. The ski resorts currently has five lifts and 16 ski trails. The summit of the resort is 2113m above sea level and the total vertical drop about 450m. The quality and quantity of snowfall at Vasilitsa allow for many off-piste routes. Black-pine trees surround the ski trails.

== Lifts and ski trails ==
- Philippos (1642-1825m), with two intermediate-easy trails and one very easy trail.
- Alexander the Great (1800–2113m), with two hard and two intermediate trails.
- Elimeia (1788–2060m), with one intermediate, three intermediate-easy and one very easy trail.
- Midganis (1810–2034m), with one intermediate trail.
- Tymfaia (1744–2040m), with two hard-intermediate trails and one intermediate trail.
- Two Baby lifts

Two of the trails have been homologated by FIS as Olympic trails.

== History ==
The first lift was built in 1975 (Elimeia). The ski resort has since had two major expansions, one in 1993 and the second in 2000.

== See also ==
- Vasilica (disambiguation)
