= Laista =

Laista Λάϊστα (Greek) Lacã (Aromanian)
- Community
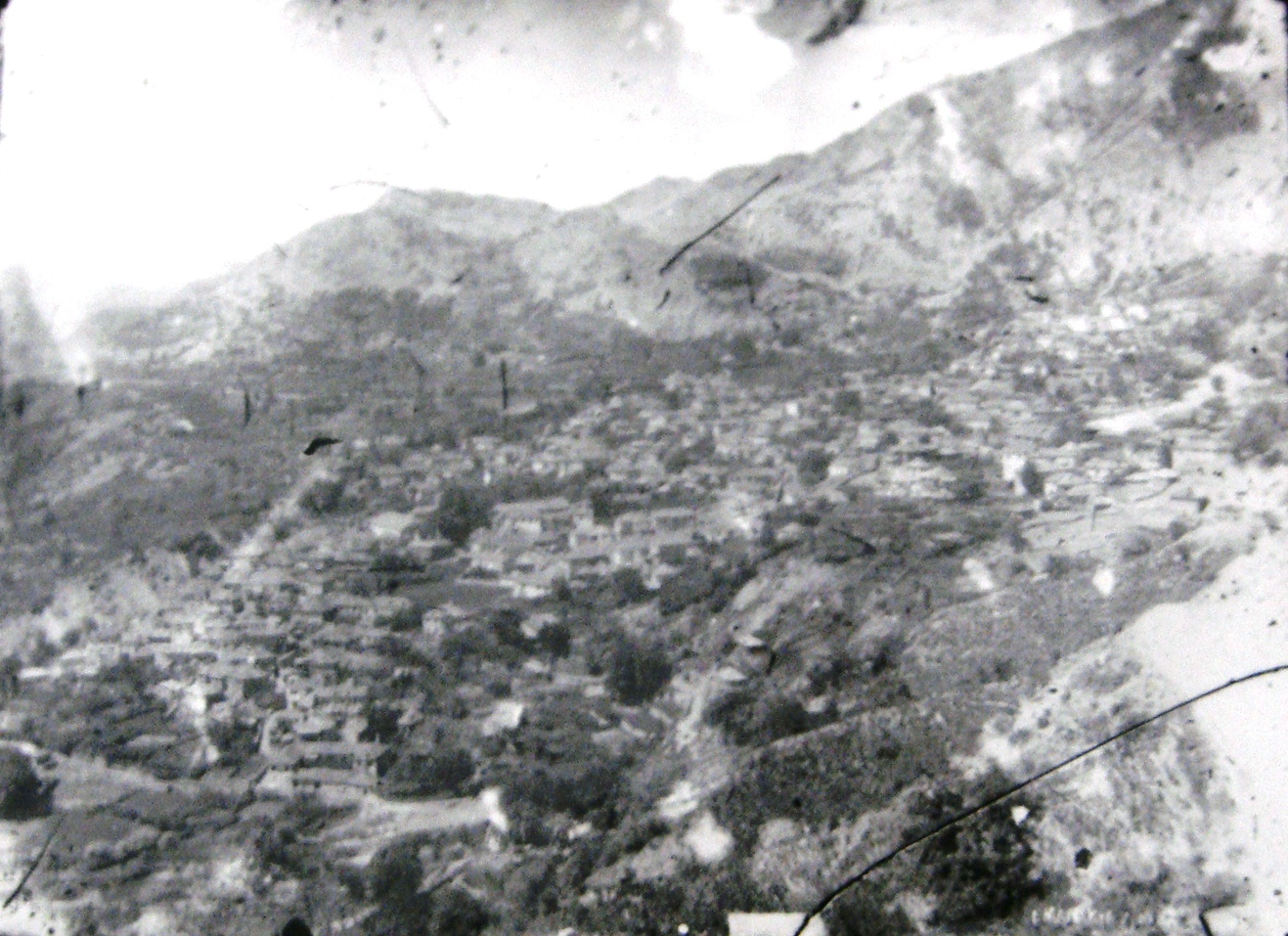
- Laista, 1901

- Location within Greece
- Coordinates: 39°58′22″N 20°57′18″E
- Country: Greece
- Administrative region: Epirus
- Regional unit: Ioannina
- Municipality: Zagori
- Municipal unit: Tymfi
- Elevation: 1,276 m (4,186 ft)

Population (2021)
  - Community: 58
- Time zone: UTC+2 (EET)
  - Summer (DST): UTC+3 (EEST)

Laista (Greek: Λάϊστα, Aromanian: Lacã) is a settlement in Ioannina regional unit, Epirus, Greece. The village located in the northern part of the Zagori region.

== Name ==
In the 19th century, the scholar Ioannis Lambridis said four families from a village called Lasste transferred the name of their former place of residence to Laista. Lambridis wrote that Laista was the oldest name of the village, which was also known as Lakka. The scholar Panagiotis Aravantinos described the toponym as Albanian. It is derived from the Albanian word lashtë meaning 'ancient, old' and the development of the sound i in the placename. The linguist Kostas Oikonomou stated the toponym recorded by Lambridis with a double s indicates an Aromanian pronunciation of š, itself from the Albanian sh.

== Demographics ==
Laista has an Aromanian population and is an Aromanian speaking village. Laista forms an Aromanian dialect cluster with the villages of Vrysochori (Lesnitsa) and Iliochori (Dobrinovo) whose spoken Aromanian differs from other Aromanian speaking villages of the wider area due to some distinct linguistic features. In the early 21st century, elderly people were bilingual in the community language and Greek, whereas younger residents under 40 might have understood the community language but did not use it. Some Sarakatsani settled in the village during the early 20th century. The Sarakatsani are Greek speakers.

== See also ==
- List of settlements in the Ioannina regional unit
