= Vrysochori =

Vrysochori Βρυσοχώρι (Greek) Leshnitsa (Aromanian)
- Community
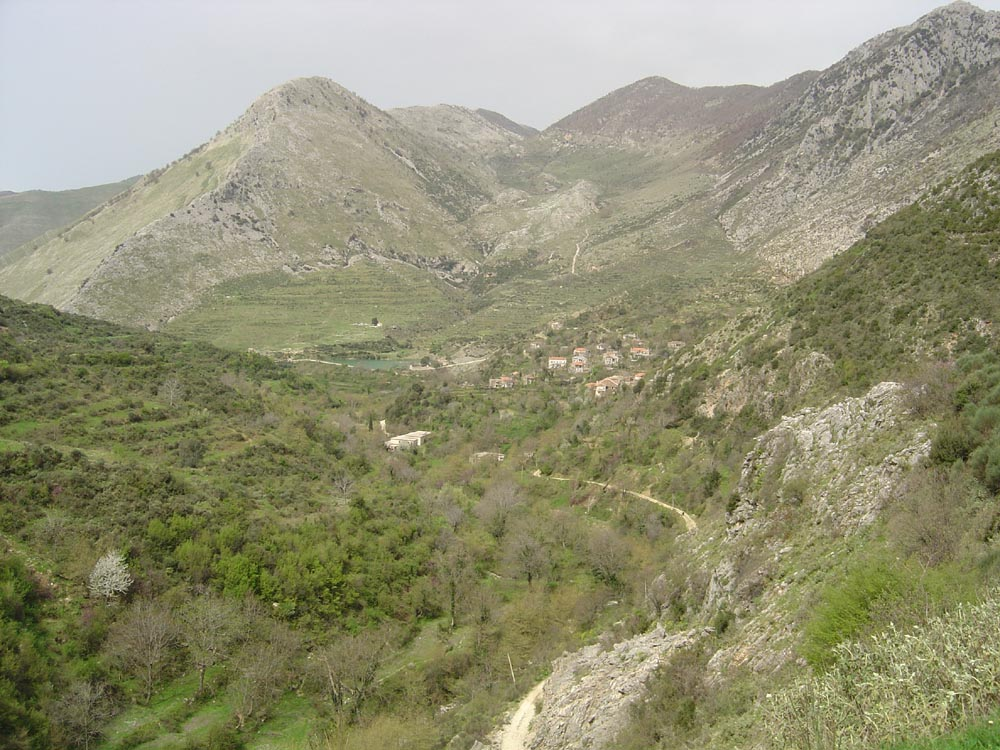
- Vrysochori

- Location within Greece
- Coordinates: 39°59′56″N 20°53′06″E
- Country: Greece
- Administrative region: Epirus
- Regional unit: Ioannina
- Municipality: Zagori
- Municipal unit: Tymfi

Population (2021)
  - Community: 82
- Time zone: UTC+2 (EET)
  - Summer (DST): UTC+3 (EEST)

Vrysochori (Greek: Βρυσοχώρι, before 1927: Λεσινίτσα, Lesinitsa; Aromanian: Leshnitsa) is a village in Ioannina regional unit, Greece. Vrysochori is in the Tymfi municipal unit, and is about 75 km (50 mi) from Ioannina. It is located in the northern part of the Zagori region.

== Name ==
In the late 19th century, the scholar Ioannis Lambridis wrote of the village as having the form Lesnitsa and interpreted it as meaning 'hazel bush'. The linguist Max Vasmer identified it with Lěsnica, a Slavic form used within toponyms in Bulgarian, Serbo-Croatian and Slovenian; he further cited Gustav Weigand, who connected the placename with the Bulgarian lěšnic meaning 'hazel bush'. Etymologically, the toponym is derived from the Slavic adjective lěsьnъ, formed from lěsъ meaning 'forest' and the adjectival ending -ьnъ, combined with the suffix -ica, with which adjectival forms are substantivised; and the rendering of the Slavic ě and ь into e and i in Greek.

== Location and climate ==
The elevation of Vrysochori is 1157 m (3799 ft) above sea-level. Vrysochori is surrounded by conifer forests and rivers at the foothills of Gamila of the Tymphis mountain range, and borders the Vikos–Aoös National Park. Vrysochori is the third largest village of Zagori Villages in terms of land size. The village is located in between the second and the fifth highest peaks of Greece, just 5 km away from the Aoos River. It is the only area of Greece where snowbanks stand throughout every season of the year. The forest area which belongs to the village is the 2nd biggest in Zagori (after Laista) and local forest maps are required for trekkers not to be lost in them, as wild pigs and bears are indigenous to the area. Because of the many rivers which cross these mountains and the village, the village has its own source of water, which the central Zagori now also uses. The secondary mountain route O3 (connecting to the main E3) passes through the village.

== History ==
Vrysochori was founded in 1295. The church of St. Charalambos dates back to 1814. The town suffered severe damage in both World War II and the Greek Civil War, and lost a large portion of its population during the 1940s as a result. The Germans burnt much of the settlement in 1943.

Prior to World War II Vrysochorians used to migrate to Thessaly, Thrace and Macedonia. Outside Greece, they migrated to the U.S.

== Demographics ==
Vrysochori has an Aromanian population and is an Aromanian speaking village. The village forms an Aromanian dialect cluster with the villages of Laista and Iliochori (Dobrinovo) whose spoken Aromanian differs from other Aromanian speaking villages of the wider area due to some distinct linguistic features. In the early 21st century, elderly people were bilingual in the community language and Greek, whereas younger residents under 40 might have understood the community language but did not use it. Some Sarakatsani settled in the village during the early 20th century. The Sarakatsani are Greek speakers.

== Local main events — Panigyri ==
1. 26–28 July, every year, there is a three (3) day continuous local traditional feast (during the feast days of Saints Pandelis and Paraskevi), one of the very few that has remained untouched by time in Greece. In the morning, villagers attend church services at the chapel of Saint Paraskevi, situated on the outskirts of the village. Following the liturgy and artoplasia (blessing of bread), elders from the village dance in the church yard. Then community members visit each other's homes, where they are treated to tsipouro (traditional alcoholic drink) and loukoumia (sweets). The first two nights there is dancing in the main square (plateia) until morning and the third morning the feast moves to "Magoula", near the forest in the area "Balta" (beside the eternal ice and snowbanks)on the Timfi Sierra Mountain range. Families roast lambs on open spits and picnic under the shade of the trees. Everyone shares food and dancing until the afternoon. Everyone is invited to join in the feasting, especially visitors who do not have permanent stay in the village and those who have come back from far and wide. As is tradition, they are treated with care and given the time to lead the dancing.

2. There is a new feast which takes place on the first Saturday after the 15th of August, called "To panigyri tis pitas" ("pie feast"). The women of the village bake homemade pites ("pies")and bring them at night to the plateia for all to share. This feast celebrates the talents of the women in the village who maintain the skills and tradition of opening handmade phillo dough and filling it with cheeses, spinach, eggs, and/or zucchini, before carefully baking it until golden brown in wood ovens (although modern ovens are also used). In the evening, villagers and visitors gather in the plateia, where traditional Epirotika music and dancing entertains those young and old. The pites ("pies) are shared among all participants by the women who created them. This new tradition began in the early 1990s and has been a great success. It is the only "pie feast" in Zagori, and every year it attracts more and more participants.

== Notable people ==
- Euterpe Bouki-Dukakis, mother of Michael Dukakis, American Democratic politician, former Governor of Massachusetts, and the Democratic presidential nominee in 1988.
- Christos Athanasiadis, a businessman who offered his inheritance to the village

== Local Club ==
Morfotikos and Oreivatikos Syllogos Vrysohoriou (Educational & Mountaineering Club of Vrysochori) issues a newspaper four times a year which is the main means of communication among people whose lineage is from Vrysochori and who are spread all around the world. Also, group organises the feasts and brings back every summer for reunions all Vrysochorites and helps the local authorities maintain the forests and the village.
