= Tsepelovo =

Tsepelovo Τσεπέλοβο
- Community
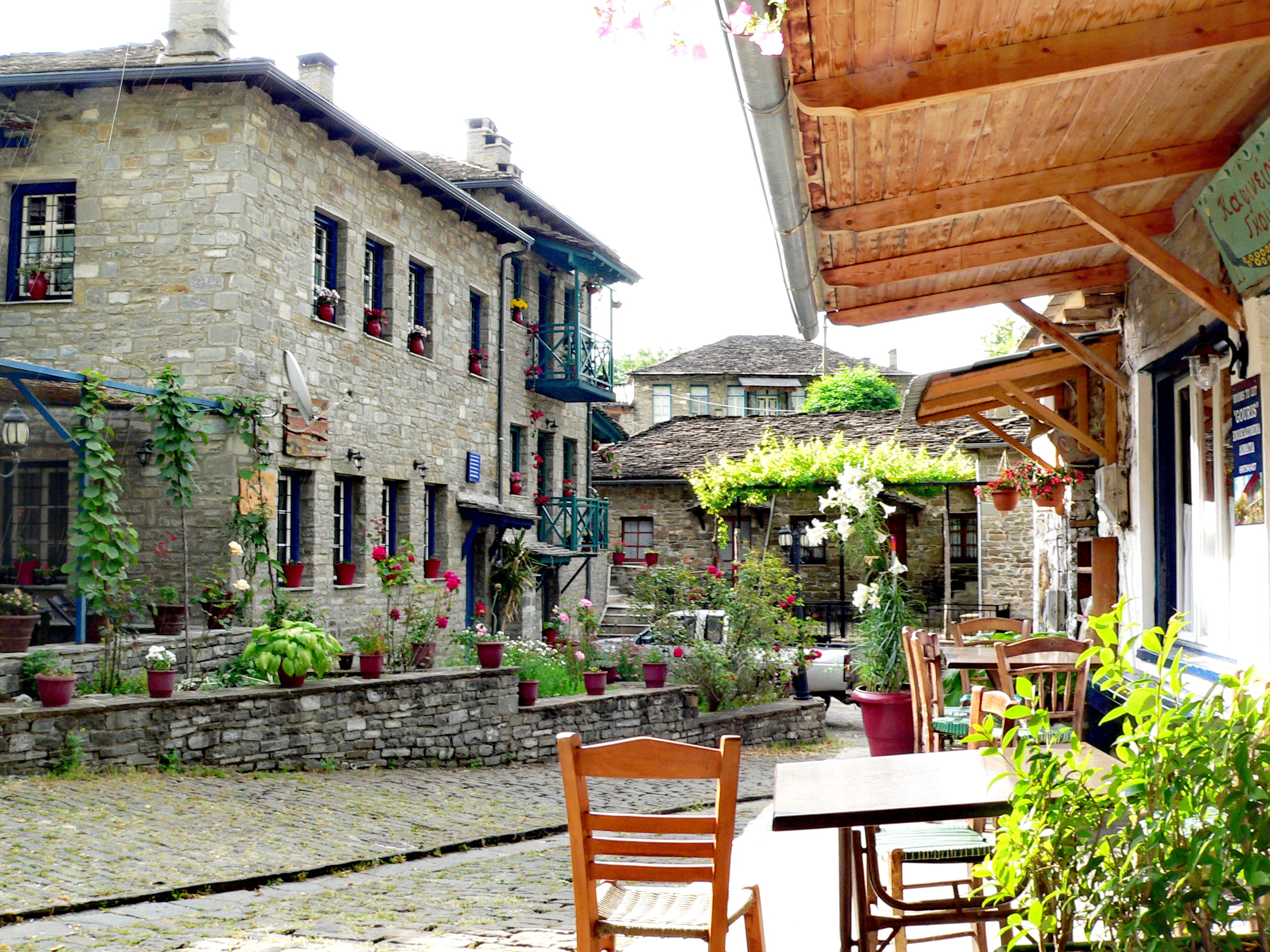
- Tsepelovo

- Location within Greece
- Coordinates: 39°54′N 20°49′E
- Country: Greece
- Administrative region: Epirus
- Regional unit: Ioannina
- Municipality: Zagori
- Municipal unit: Tymfi
- Elevation: 1,080 m (3,540 ft)

Population (2021)
  - Community: 220
- Time zone: UTC+2 (EET)
  - Summer (DST): UTC+3 (EEST)
- Vehicle registration: ΙΝ

Tsepelovo (Greek: Τσεπέλοβο, Aromanian: Tsipelovo) is a village in the Zagori region (Epirus region). It stands at a height of 1,200 meters in a panoramic location on the mountain range of Tymfi. It is the biggest of the 45 villages of Zagori and it was the seat of Tymfi municipality. It lies in the middle of the Vikos–Aoös National Park, 48 km from Ioannina.

== Name ==
The scholar Ioannis Lambridis wrote that the etymology of the placename referred to 'a village under the sword and not belonging to the sword' and said others described it as meaning 'a place full of grass' in Turkish. The linguist Max Vasmer derived it from a proper name of Turko-Tatar origin and the Slavic suffix -ovo. The linguist Kostas Oikonomou stated the toponym stems from a Greek-origin surname Tsepelis and the Slavic suffix -ovo, which became productive in Greek and formed the placename.

The surname Tsepelis comes from the Turkish gepel, meaning 'dirty, filthy' or 'bad, unpleasant', a word that also appears in South Slavic toponyms, although it is absent in South Slavic personal names. The form present in Western Slavic personal names is of a different etymological origin.

== History ==
Tsepelovo was founded in the 16th century. In the Ottoman period, the village was an administrative centre of the Zagori region. It remained relatively prosperous until the end of Ottoman rule (1912). The village was a local trade center, and remains so especially because of the trade of timber. In 1820, before the outbreak of the Greek Revolution and the defeat of Ali Pasha, the poet Ioannis Vilaras and the famous Epirote scholar Athanasios Psalidas came from Ioannina to prepare the people for the great national revolt. Psalidas also taught for 2 years at the local school.

The traditional stone architecture is visible in every building, in the village paths, dwellings and churches. The historical church of Agios Nikolaos was renovated at 1753 and decorated with unique wall paintings by exceptional painters of nearby Kapesovo.

Two kilometers out of the village, in the Vikaki (Greek: small Vikos) canyon lies the monastery of St John Rogovou. It was founded at 1028 by the sister of Emperor Romanos III Argyros of Byzantium. It was rebuilt in 1749, possibly after it was damaged by fire, and the frescoes were painted by iconographers from Kapesovo. Neofytos Doukas wanted to establish there the Higher School of Epirus (Greek: Ανωτέρα Σχολή), a high level educational institution. Because of the outbreak of the Greek War of Independence and the military conflicts the idea could not become reality.

The people of Tsepelovo used to emigrate within Greece to Macedonia, Thrace and to areas of southern Greece. Outside Greece, they mainly migrated to Asia Minor and the U.S.

Today, the village is a popular destination for tourists during the winter season.

== Demographics ==
Historical population
Year	Pop.	±%
1991	304	—
2001	348	+14.5%
2011	261	−25.0%
2021	220	−15.7%

The village is inhabited by Greeks, an Aromanian community along with Arvanite families who both have assimilated into the local population, and some Sarakatsani who settled in the village during the early 20th century. The arrival of Orthodox Albanians (locally called "Arvanites") occurred in the modern period and originate from the wider Souli area in central Greek Epirus, while the Sarakatsani are Greek speakers.

== Nearest places ==
- Skamneli, east (distance: 4 km)
- Vradeto, west (distance: 7 km)

== Notable people ==
- Konstantinos Rados, merchant and member of Filiki Eteria.
- Marika Kotopouli (1887–1954), actress.

== Gallery ==
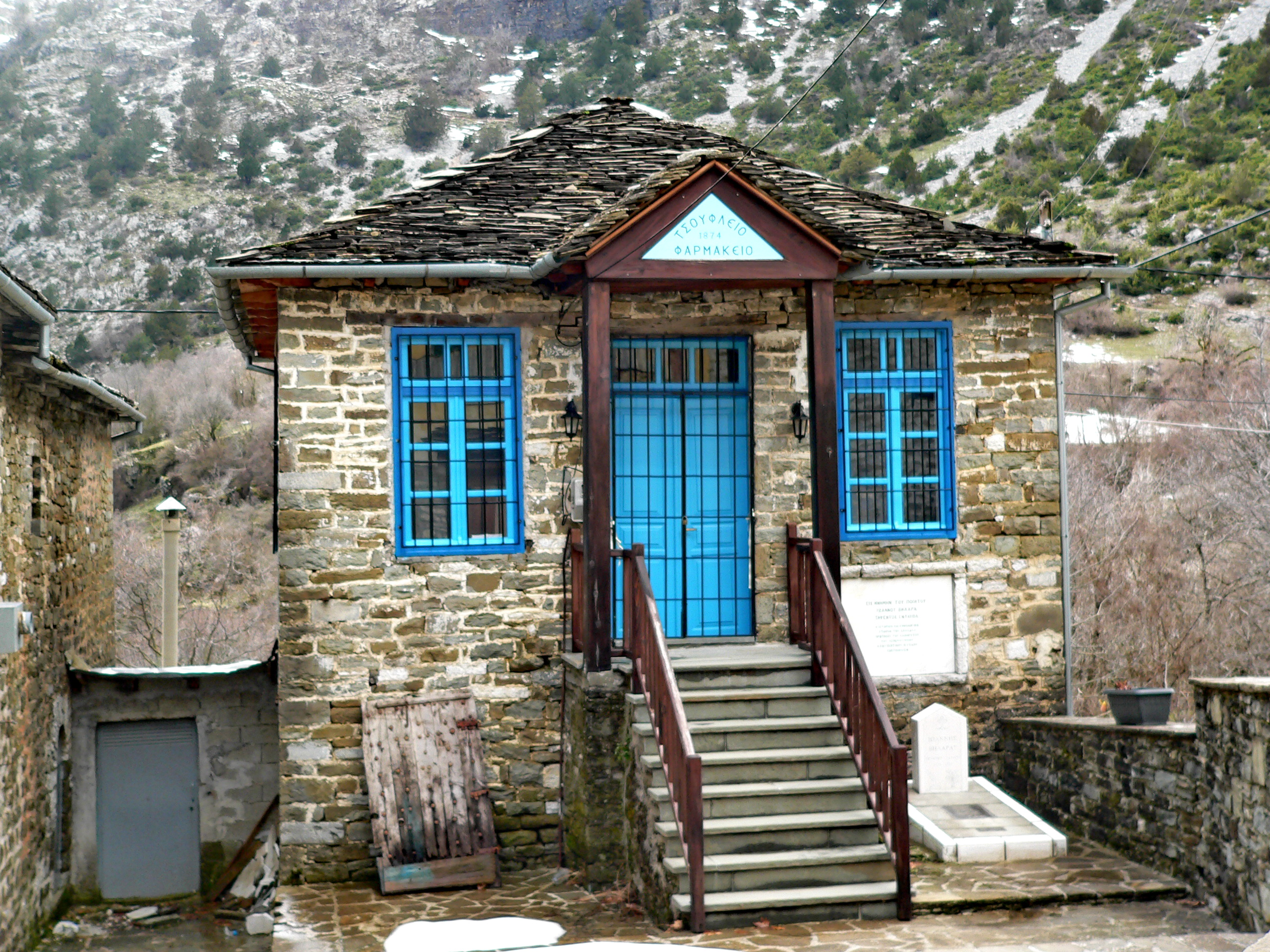
Tsouflion Pharmacy and the grave of I. Villaras in the village.

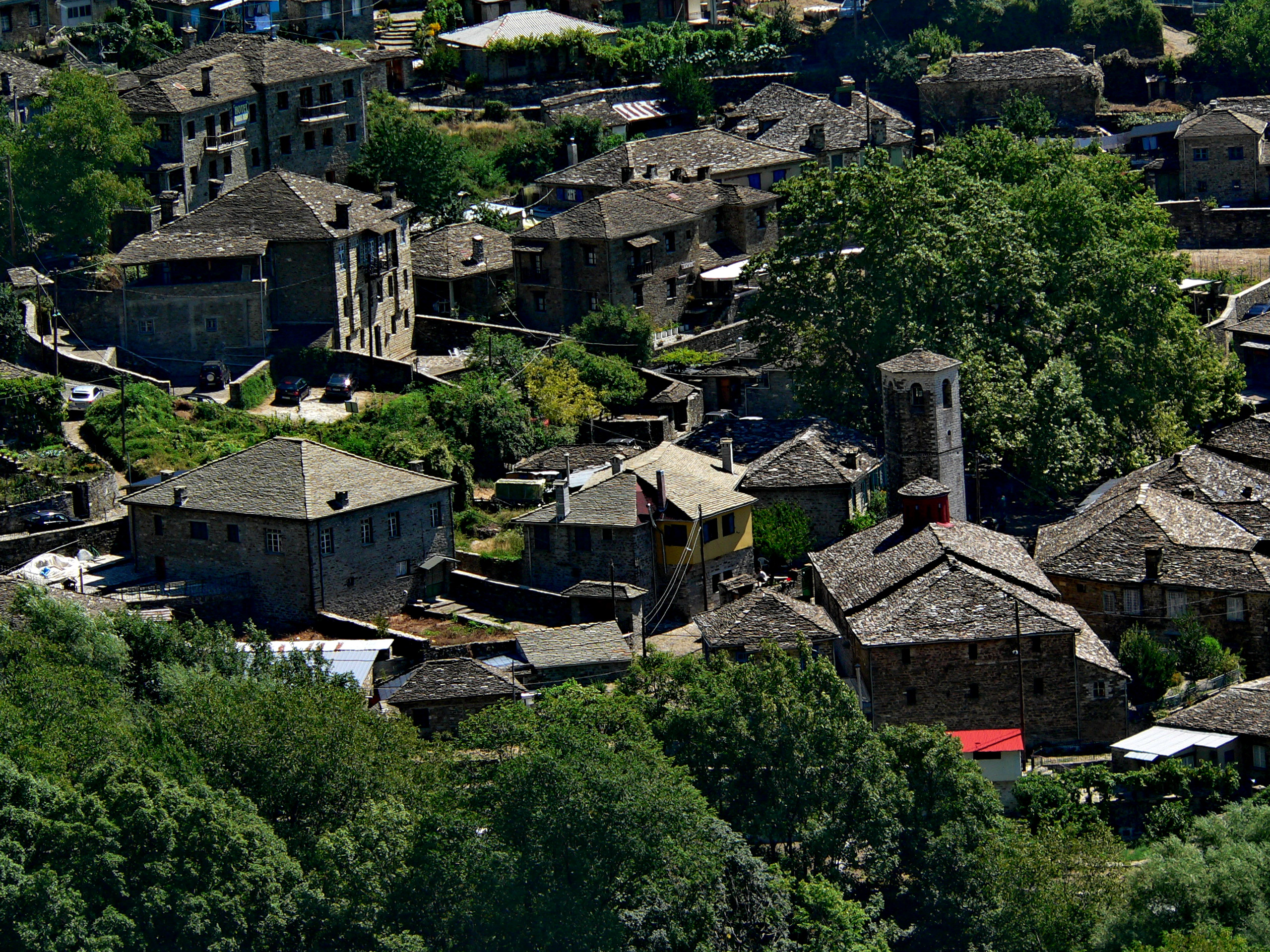
Partial view of the village.

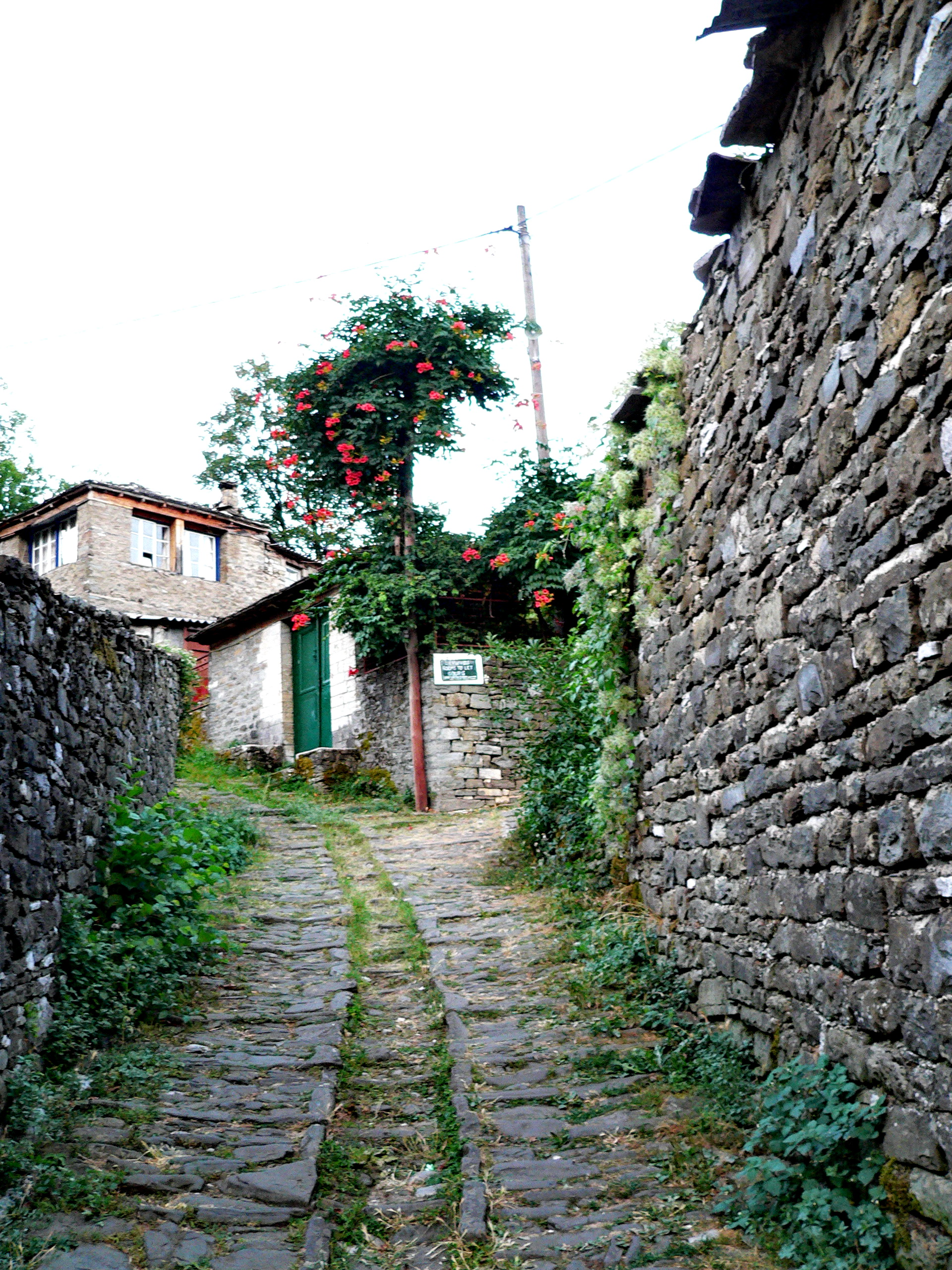
Stone alley in the village

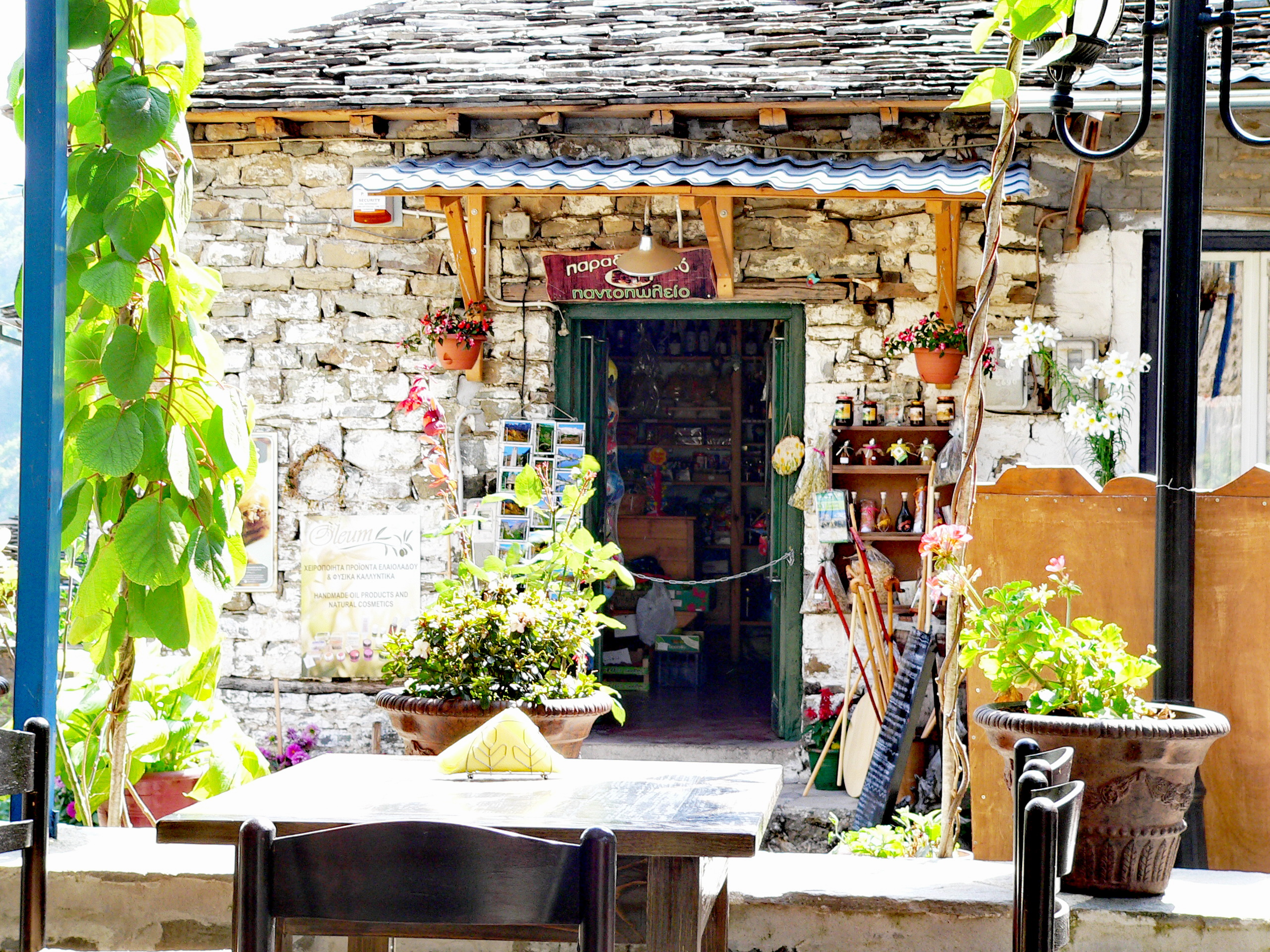
Traditional grocery in the village.

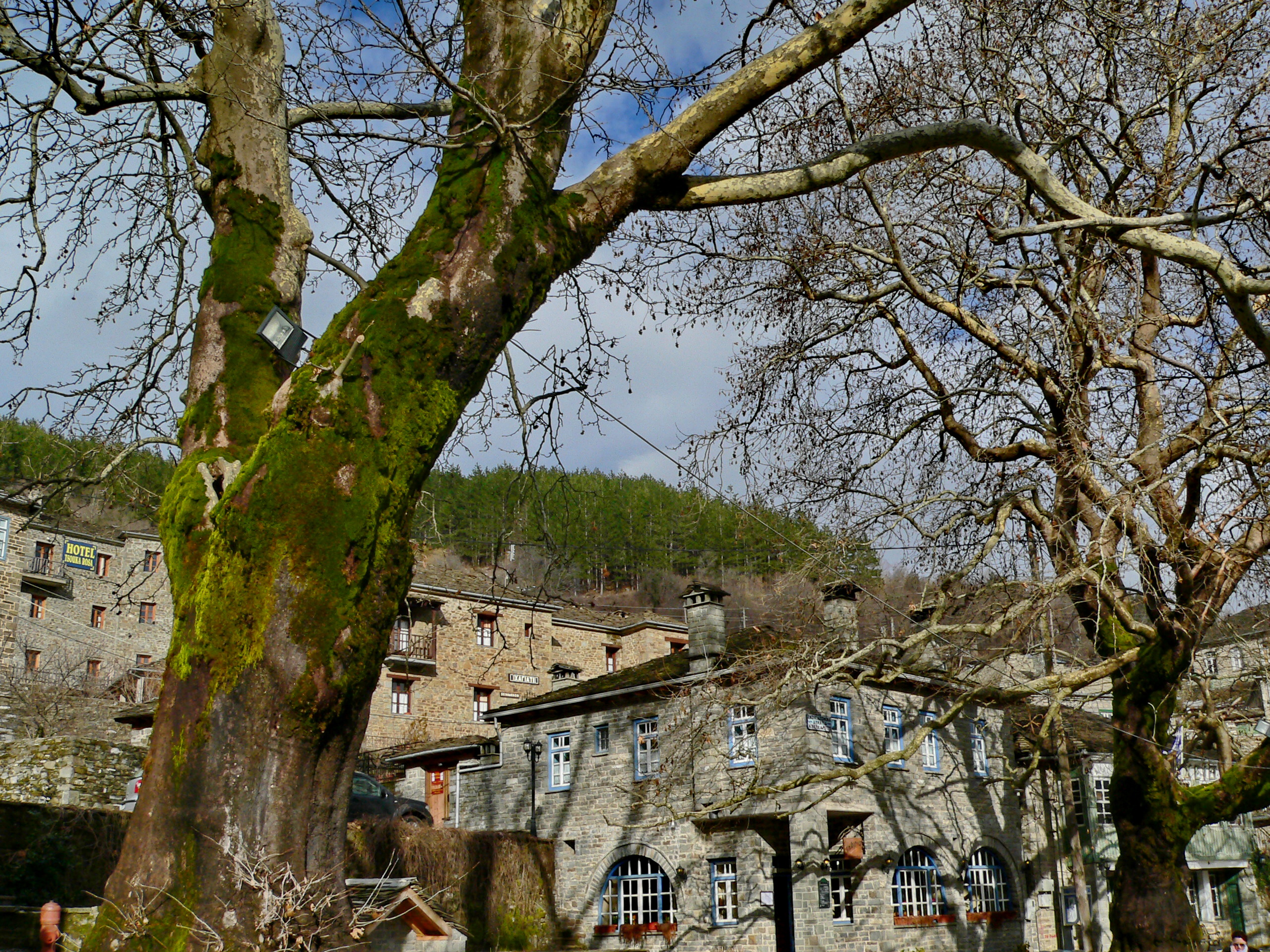
Partial view of the village.

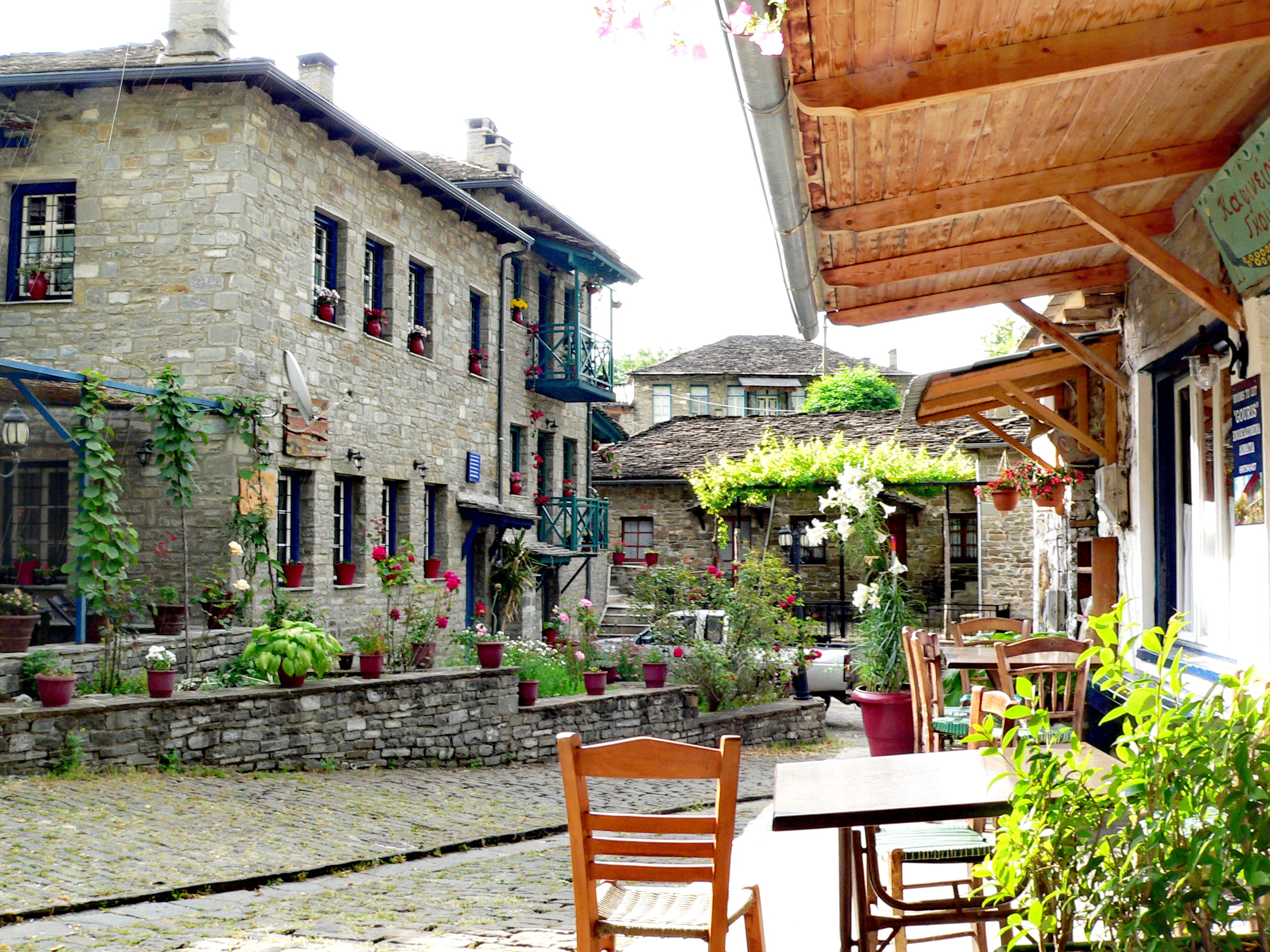
Partial view of the square in the village.

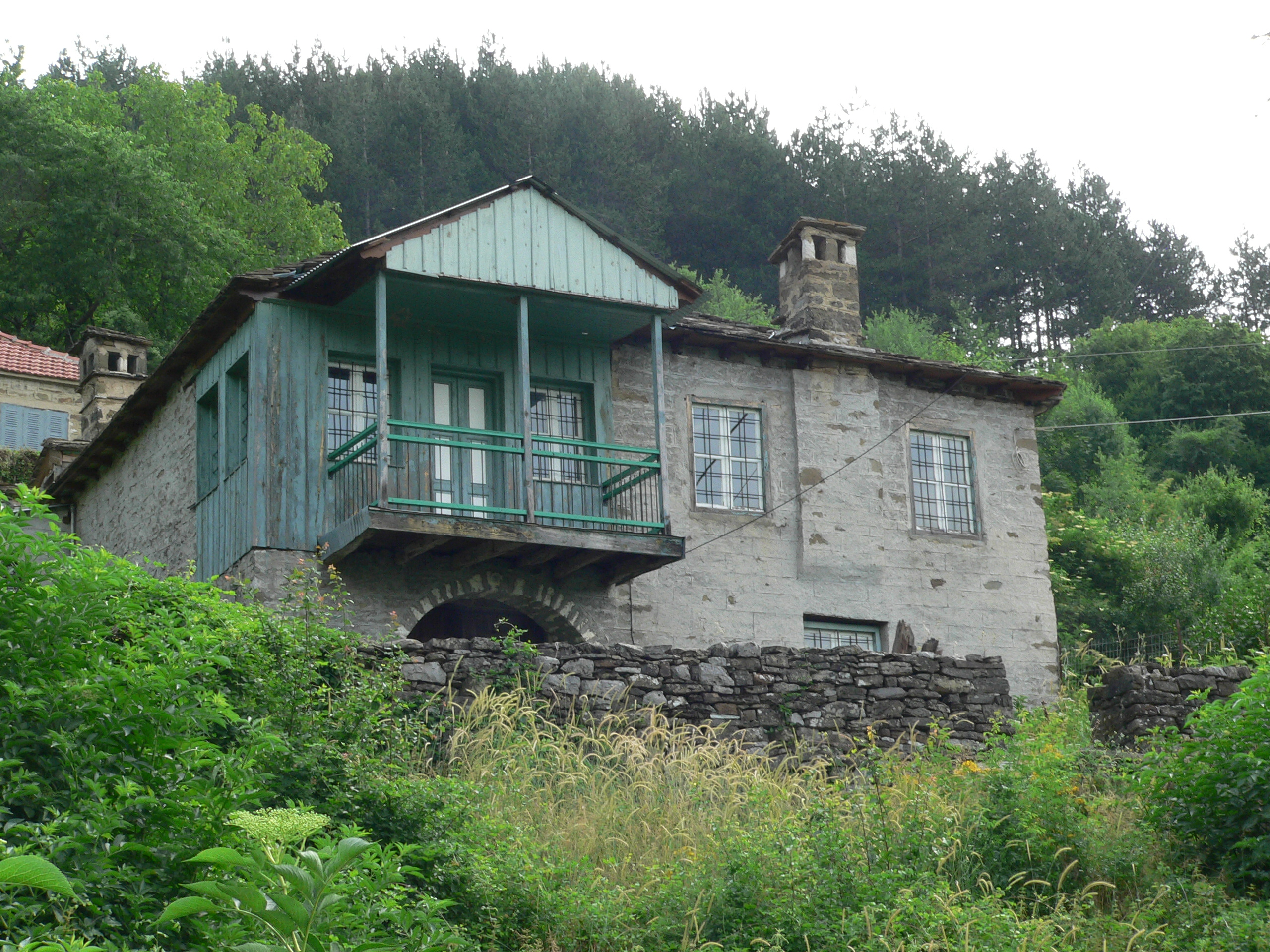
Tradiotinal house in the village.

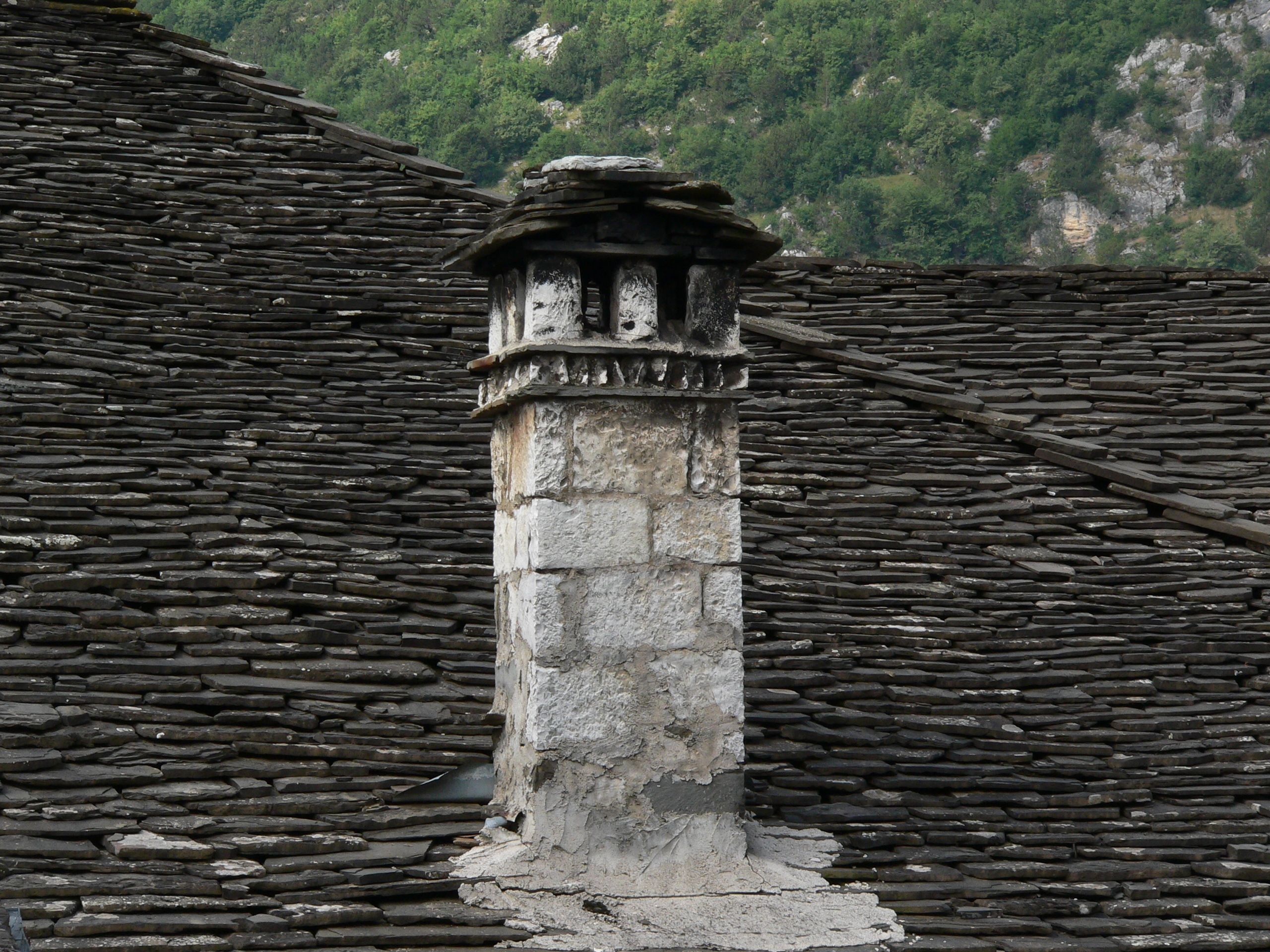
Chimney of a traditional house in the village.

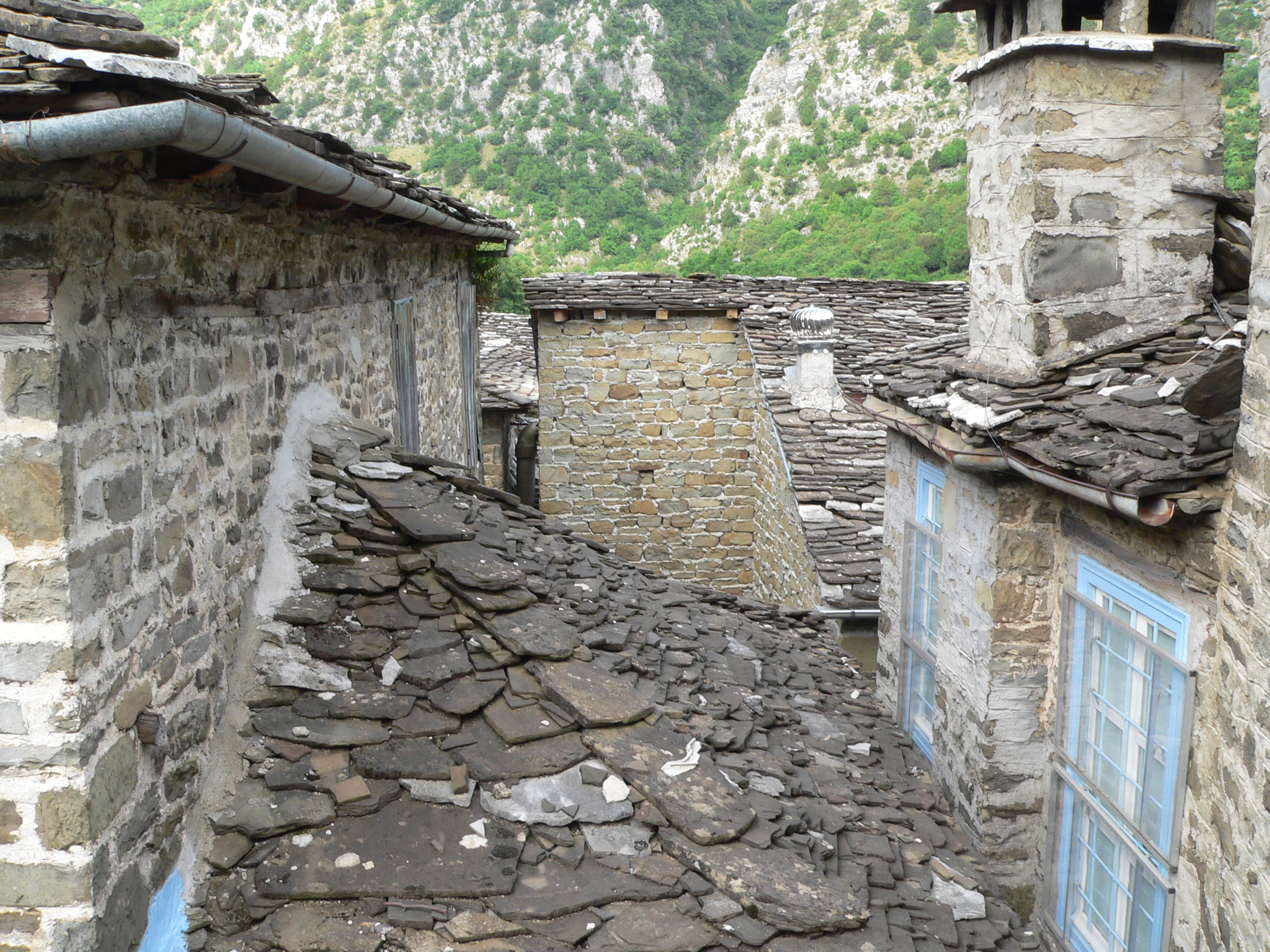
Partial view of the traditional houses in the village.

== See also ==
- Zagori
- Vikos–Aoös National Park
