= Vradeto =

Vradeto Βραδέτο
- Community
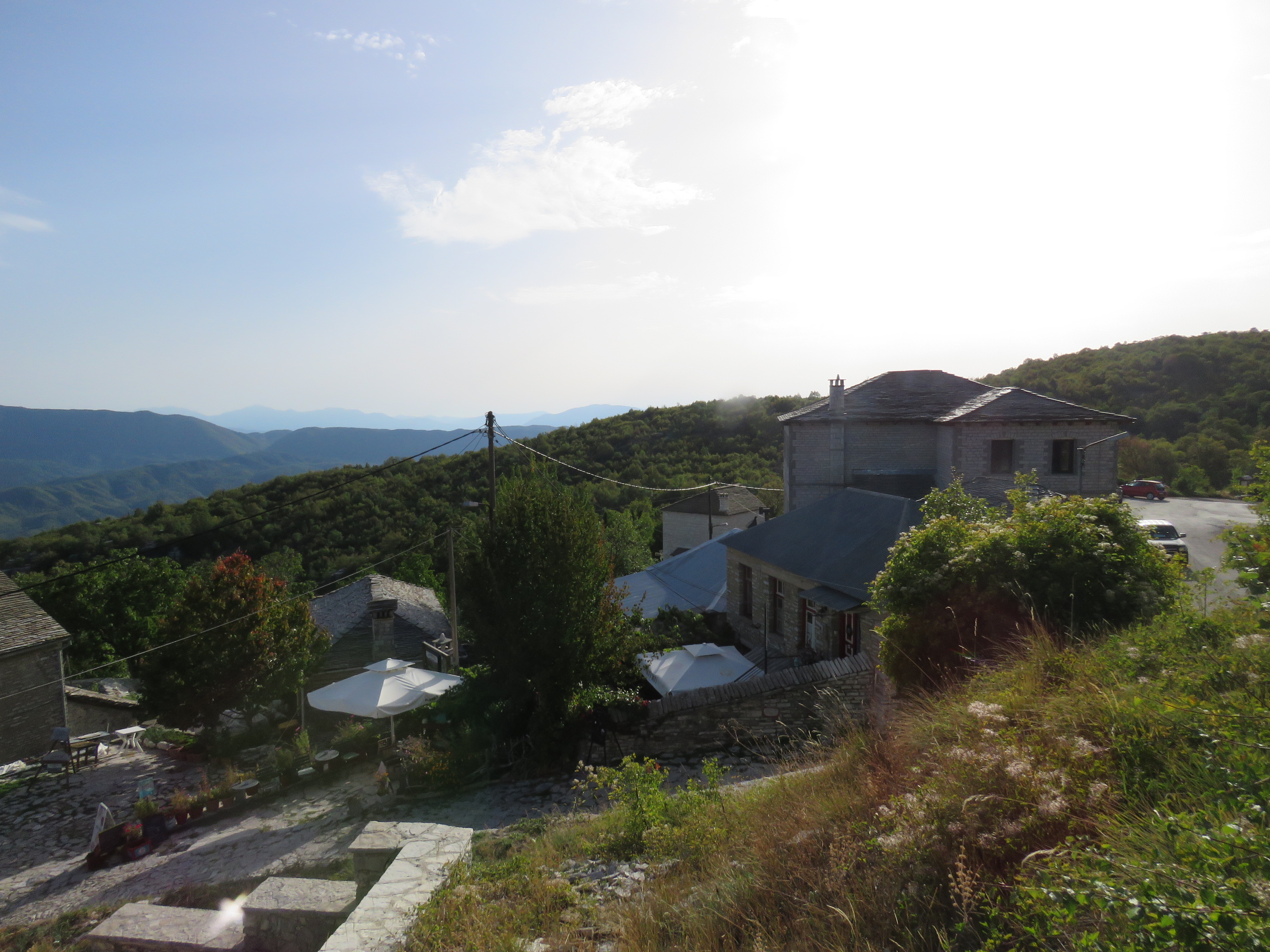

- Location within Greece
- Coordinates: 39°53′50″N 20°46′40″E
- Country: Greece
- Administrative region: Epirus
- Regional unit: Ioannina
- Municipality: Zagori
- Municipal unit: Tymfi

Area
  - Community: 30.10 km^{2} (11.62 sq mi)
- Elevation: 1,340 m (4,400 ft)

Population (2021)
  - Community: 22
  - Density: 0.73/km^{2} (1.9/sq mi)
- Time zone: UTC+2 (EET)
  - Summer (DST): UTC+3 (EEST)

Vradeto (Greek: Βραδέτο) is a village in the Greek Zagori region (Epirus region). It lies at a height of 1,340 m (4,400 ft) on Mt Tymphe in the Pindus mountain range. It is the highest of the 44 villages of Zagori.

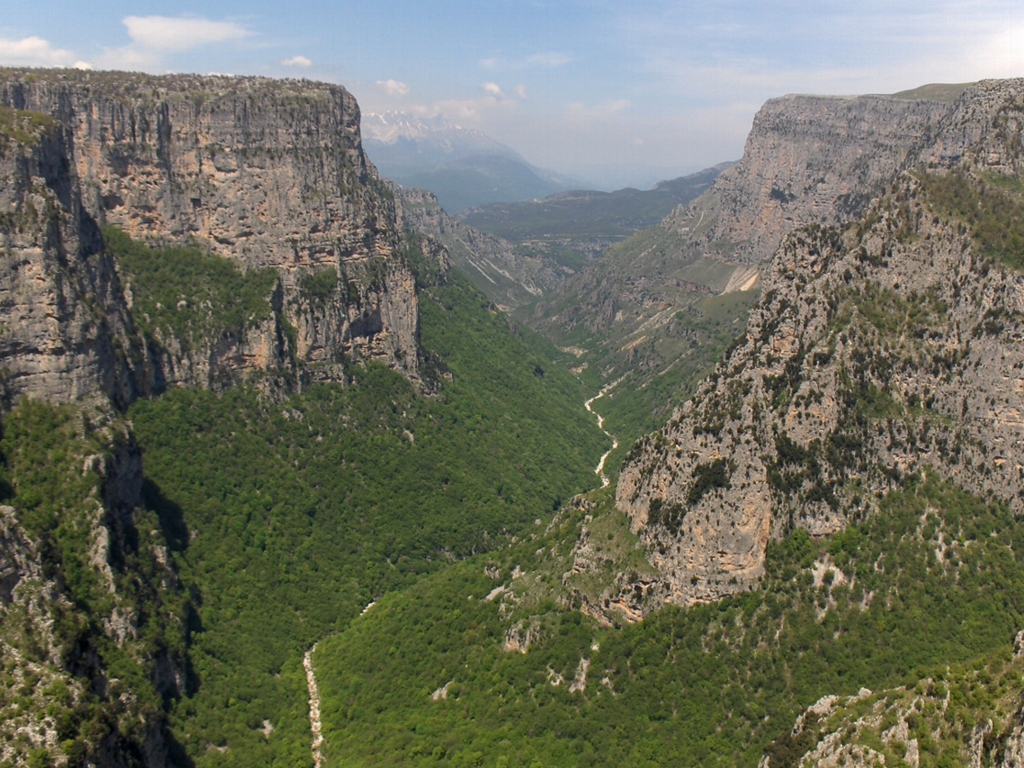
View of Vikos gorge from Beloe

It is the middle of the Vikos–Aoös National Park and is about 50 km (31 mi) away from Ioannina. It is located only a few kilometers from the Vikos Gorge and near one of the best vantage points, Beloe (Beloi) (perhaps a Slavic word meaning "good view" or "balcony"). It is located also close to an alpine lake called Drakolimni (Dragon's Lake), one of several such lakes. The lakes are named after the amphibian newts (Ichthyosaura alpestris) that live in them, around which there are myths of dragons. The myths are echoes of ancient myths about the hero Pindus, son of Macedon, who either befriended or according to another myth killed a dragon.

== Name ==
The toponym Vradeto is derived from the Aromanian noun brad 'fir' and the suffix -et, stemming from Latin -etum, also the source of the Italian suffix for plants -eto. The Aromanian common noun comes from the Latin brathy, -yos, from the Greek vráthy, -nos meaning 'a type of shrub having cypress-like leaves'. In addition, the term is present in Albanian as bredh, -i 'fir' and the Romanian brad 'fir' and brădet 'fir forest' used in Romanian toponymy.

== Nearest places ==
- Tsepelovo, east (distance: 10 km (6.2 mi))
- Kapesovo, south (distance: 5 km (3.1 mi))

== Population ==
Historical population
Year	Pop.	±%
1991	32	—
2001	12	−62.5%
2011	21	+75.0%
2021	22	+4.8%

== History ==
Until the close of the 20th century there was only one way to reach the village, via a kalderimi (paved mule road) called the Skala of Vradeto (Greek: Σκάλα Βραδέτου) a stairway of about 1,000 steps built on the side of a canyon and almost impossible to seem from a distance. It starts at the end of a long path from the village of Kapesovo. Vradeto's difficulty of access probably explains its location in the inhospitable highlands near the top of Mt Tymphe. A road was opened in the 1970s. It is believed to have been settled initially by families from Skamneli at around 1616, according to Ioannis Lamprides.

The traditional stone architecture is dominant in every building, in the village paths, dwellings and churches, many now ruined or in a state of significant disrepair. The main church, dedicated to the Birth of Mary (Greek: Ναός Γεννήσεως της Θεοτόκου) was built in 1799 with a donation from Nikolaos Tsigaras. Other churches are those of Agios Athanasios at the top of the Skala, Agios Nikolaos, Prophetes Elias and Agios Georgios with a cemetery.

== Folklore ==
The Feast of the Birth of Mary is celebrated with a three-day festival starting on 8 September.

== Demographics ==
The village is inhabited by Greeks, Arvanite families who assimilated into the local population and some Sarakatsani who settled in the village during the early 20th century. The arrival of Orthodox Albanians (locally called "Arvanites") occurred in the modern period and originate from the wider Souli area in central Greek Epirus, while the Sarakatsani are Greek speakers.
