= Negades =

- Community
- Location within Greece
- Coordinates: 39°51′47″N 20°50′50″E
- Country: Greece
- Administrative region: Epirus
- Regional unit: Ioannina
- Municipality: Zagori
- Municipal unit: Tymfi
- Elevation: 1,073 m (3,520 ft)

Population (2021)
  - Community: 33
- Time zone: UTC+2 (EET)
  - Summer (DST): UTC+3 (EEST)

Negades (Greek: Νεγάδες, Aromanian: Neațiańi, Ńigădz) is a settlement in Ioannina regional unit, Epirus, Greece.

== Name ==
The toponym is in the feminine form derived from the surname Negas, where it was formed to indicate the Nega family and the place where they settled. The surname Negas is derived from the Slavic nega, meaning 'joy, cheerfulness', a word used in the formation of many Slavic personal names, and is also a surname used by Albanian speakers, as Neg/ë. The Slavic sound g shifted to γ in Greek within the toponym. The suffix ades is common in Epirus and Corfu.

== Demographics ==
The village is inhabited by Greeks, and an Aromanian community which has assimilated into the local population.

== See also ==
- List of settlements in the Ioannina regional unit
