= Gyftokampos =

Coordinates: 39°55′N 20°51′E

Gyftokampos (Greek: Γυφτόκαμπος) is an area ιn the Zagori region (Epirus region), 58 km north of Ioannina. Its name is derived from the Greek "gyftos" (γύφτος), gypsy and "kampos" (Latin: campus) that means "field", and could be rendered in English translation as "gypsy lea". There used to be a hamlet called Nouka on this location which was also used by the Sarakatsani as pasture grounds. The area, located at the base of Mt Tymfi, has traditionally belonged to the village of Skamneli and it forms part of the municipality of Tymfi.

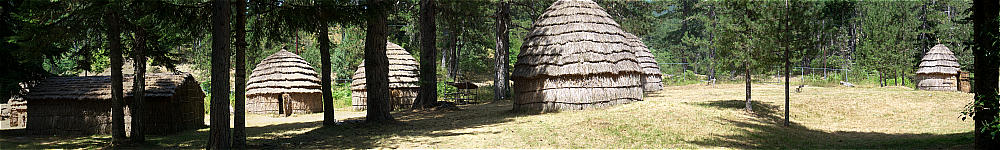
Gyftokampos

== History ==
Until the early 20th century, the area was open and used as a grazing ground by the Sarakatsani . It has become gradually wooded by coniferous trees, including impressive Scots pines. Huts of Sarakatsani were in use until the 1990s. Today an open-air "museum" with typical Sarakatsani huts and animal enclosures has been built. The area is used for an annual Sarakatsani festival in the first week of August.

== Sources ==
- www.timfi.gov.gr (in Greek)
