= Tymfi (municipal unit) =

Tymfi Τύμφη
- Municipal unit
- Location within the regional unit

- Location within Greece
- Coordinates: 39°52′N 20°46′E
- Country: Greece
- Administrative region: Epirus
- Regional unit: Ioannina
- Municipality: Zagori

Area
  - Municipal unit: 428.296 km^{2} (165.366 sq mi)

Population (2021)
  - Municipal unit: 847
  - Municipal unit density: 1.98/km^{2} (5.12/sq mi)
- Time zone: UTC+2 (EET)
  - Summer (DST): UTC+3 (EEST)
- Vehicle registration: ΙΝ

Tymfi (Greek: Τύμφη) is a former municipality in the Ioannina regional unit, Epirus, Greece. Since the 2011 local government reform it is part of the Zagori municipality. Population 847 (2021). The seat of the municipality was in Tsepelovo. It took its name from the Tymfi mountain.

== Subdivisions ==
The municipal unit Tymfi is subdivided into the following communities:

- Tsepelovo
- Vradeto
- Vrysochori
- Iliochori
- Kapesovo
- Kipoi
- Koukouli
- Laista
- Leptokarya
- Negades
- Skamneli
- Fragkades
