= Kalderimi =

Ottoman-era cobbled mule tracks

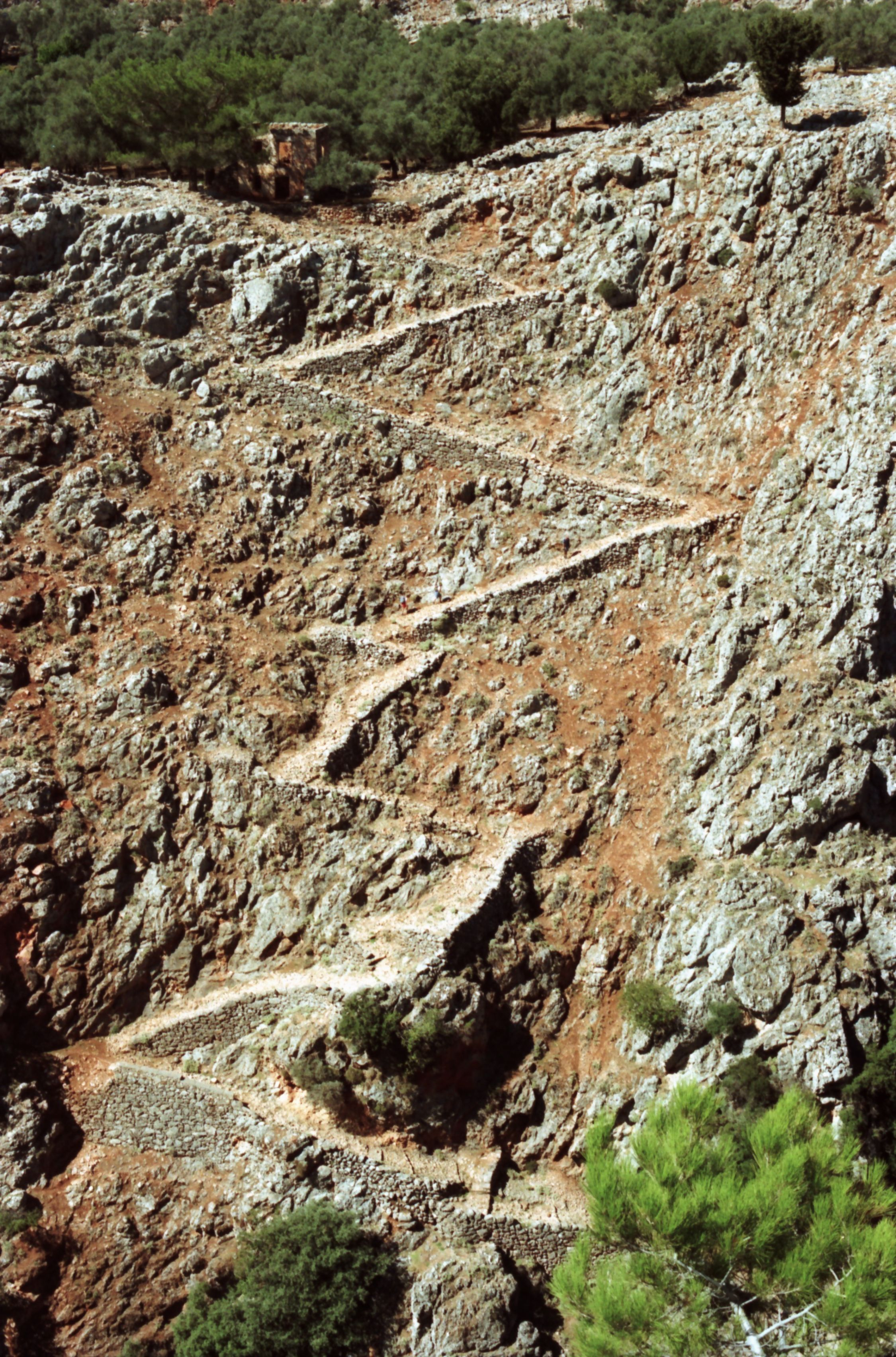
Kalderimi crossing the Aradena gorge on Crete

In the former Ottoman countries, a kaldırım (Turkish) or kalderimi (Greek: καλντερίμι or καλντιρίμι; plural kalderimia) is a cobblestone-paved road built for hoofed traffic. Kalderimia are sometimes described as cobbled or paved mule tracks or trails.

Kalderimia are typically 2 m wide, though there are reports of widths from 1 to 4.5 m, "so that two fully laden mules could pass each other without much difficulty".

In Greece, the kalderimi network formerly linked almost every village, hamlet, chapel, and even sheepfold. There were thousands of kilometers of these roads in Crete alone. These roads are paved with flat stones. As they are designed for foot and hoofed traffic, they have steps where necessary, made of stones laid vertically. On flat stretches, they may be unpaved. On slopes, they have retaining walls. Kalderimia use switchbacks on steep ascents and often have parapets next to steep slopes. When they cross streams, there may be paved fords.

The Skala of Vradeto (Greek: Σκάλα Βραδέτου) is a well-known kalderimi in the Epirus village of Vradeto used to enter the Vikos Gorge.

After many years of neglect, overgrowth, and destruction for modern roadbuilding, there are now some initiatives to map and restore kaldirimia for walking tourism.

In Turkish, a kaldırım is more generically a paved street, for example the steep stepped Yüksek Kaldırım in Karaköy, Istanbul.

== History ==
Kalderimia existed under the Ottoman Empire, and the name is Turkish, but it is not clear when they were first built. Many may follow earlier Roman and Venetian roads, with new paving.

In many parts of rural Greece, the kalderimia were the principal means of travel until the 1960s or 1970s. Unlike modern roads, which generally connect adjacent villages at the same altitudes, the kaldemiri network mostly ran up and down the mountainsides, connecting to villagers' fields. The modern roads have now changed the relations among villages:

Previously, communications between villages were via the old kalderimia... the most direct communication between villages other than those adjacent to each other was usually over the top of the peninsula and down again. Thus, although the old communication system was organised primarily on a vertical axis, the new one had a horizontal axis. In addition, the kalderimia communication system tended to take people close to areas which belonged to them as they travelled up and down the mountain between villages. In the new system, their travel was divorced from proximity to most of their land. ... Travel between [villages on opposite sides of the peninsula] by the new vehicular road... had Loutra as its hub, ... often with a protracted stop there.... Road-construction programmes on Methana have therefore unintentionally changed Methanites' cognitive maps of the landscape.

— Forbes, 2007

== Name ==
The name kalderimi comes from Turkish kaldırım 'pavement', from kaldır- 'to raise, erect' + kaldır- + -im (deverbal noun suffix). A popular etymology derives it from Greek καλός δρόμος 'good road'.
