= Skamneli =

Skamneli Σκαμνέλι
- Community
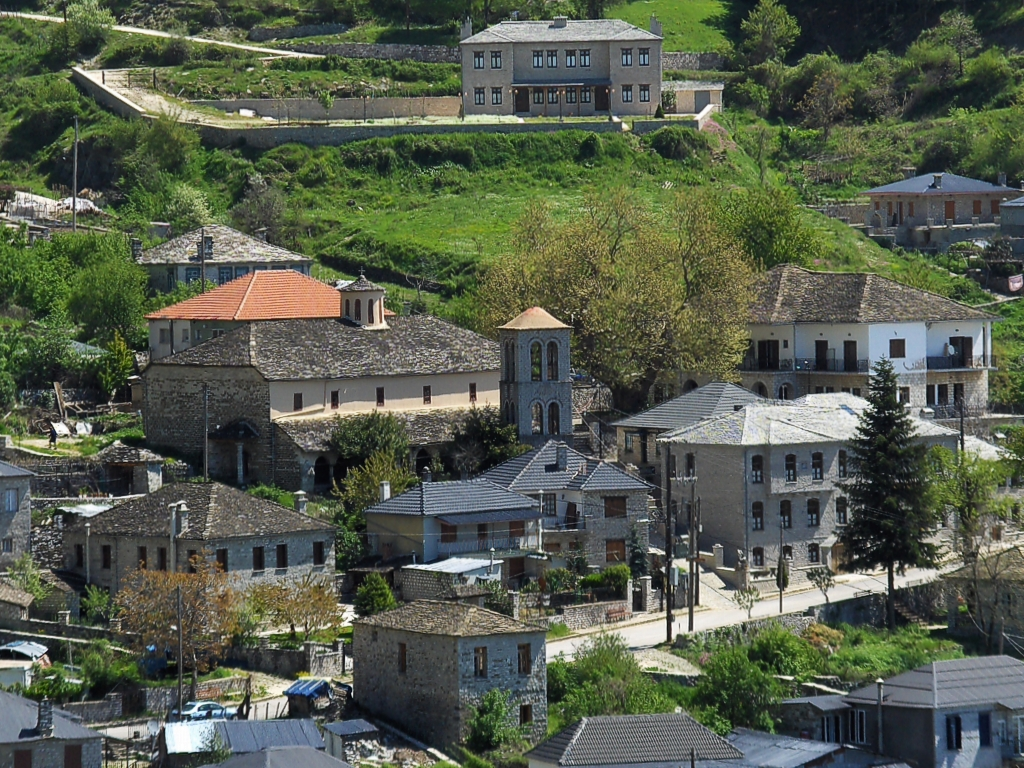

- Location within Greece
- Coordinates: 39°55′N 20°51′E
- Country: Greece
- Administrative region: Epirus
- Regional unit: Ioannina
- Municipality: Zagori
- Municipal unit: Tymfi
- Elevation: 1,160 m (3,810 ft)

Population (2021)
  - Community: 92
- Time zone: UTC+2 (EET)
  - Summer (DST): UTC+3 (EEST)
- Vehicle registration: ΙΝ

Skamneli (Greek: Σκαμνέλι) is a village in the Zagori region (Epirus region), 54 km north of Ioannina. It is built in the fringes of mountain Tymfi (Mt Tymphe), at a height of 1160 m.

== Name ==
The toponym is in the feminine form derived from the surname Skamnelis, with a change of gender matching the noun for a village or place. The linguist Kostas Oikonomou wrote that Skamneli cannot be derived from the Greek form skamneli meaning 'small stool', and though it can be created, the form is not used in the area of Epirus; instead, the diminutive for stool is expressed as skamnaki. This also applies to the surnames Skamnelis and Skamnelos, which do not stem from the unmarked diminutive form skamneli. Oikonomou stated the placename originates either from the surname Skamnis, derived from the word skamni 'stool' and the anthroponymic suffix -elis, or from the Aromanian noun scamnel 'little stool', a diminutive of scamnu.

== History ==
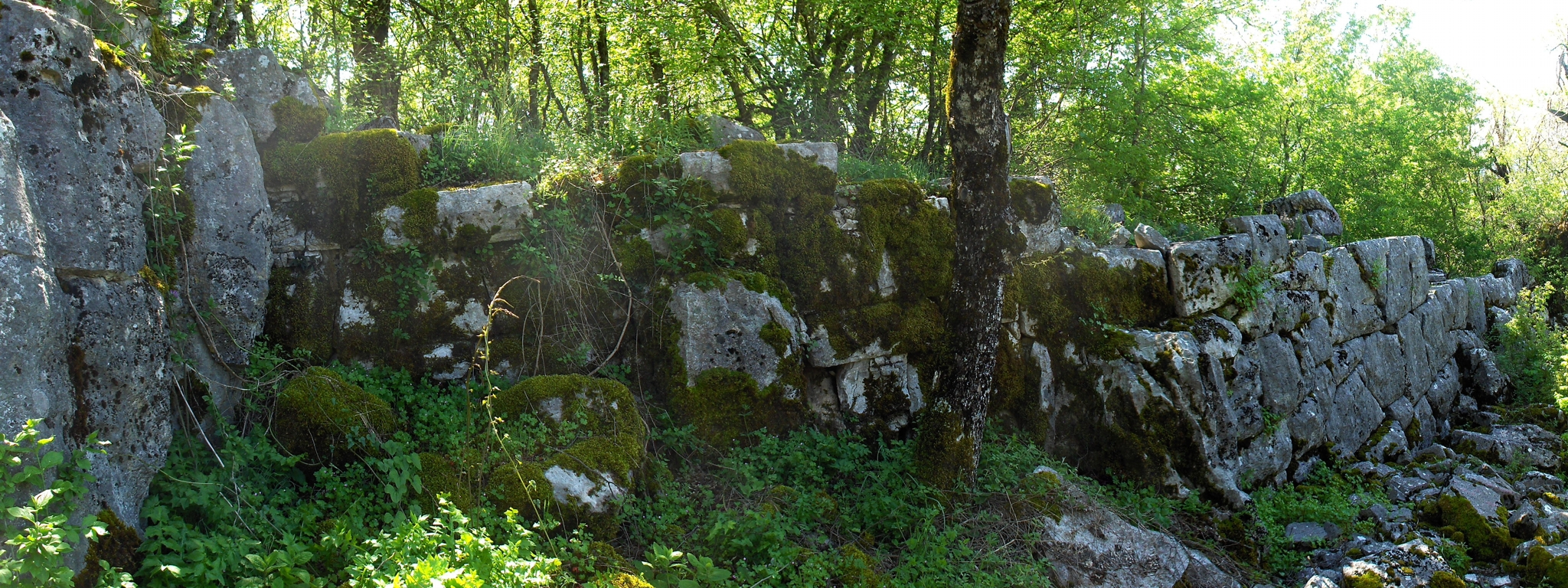
Skamneli Palaiokastro

The village is not mentioned in the Turkish records of 1564. There seemed to be in the area several other small villages that slowly coalesced with Skamneli in the 17th century. These were Catuna or Catuni, Agios Georgios, Prophetes Elias, Gardiki, Trepesi, Kotsanades, Palaiochori (Koziakos-Katsikochori) and Nouka. Nouka (Nuca) was a small settlement of Aromanians (Vlachs) at Gyftokampos.

The region of the village was inhabited since prehistoric times, as there have been found ancient, so-called Pelasgian fortifications, known by the locals also as the Palaiokastro. They were visited by Nicholas Hammond in 1930 and in 1939, prior to the publication of his book Epirus. Prof Daskaris of the University of Ioannina dated these to the 8th century BC.

Moreover, remains of a 4th- to 3rd-century BC circular tower, a rectangular tower, a gate and two smaller doorways have been identified near the entrance of the village in the vicinity of the Monastery of St Paraskevi. Graves dating from Hellenistic times were unearthed in 2017. In the Ottoman period, Skamneli belonged to the Koinon of the Zagorisians (Greek: Κοινόν Ζαγορισίων) formed after a treaty with Sinan-Pasha in 1431. Ιt enjoyed along with the other villages a joint autonomy from Ottoman rule. The autonomy guaranteed non-interference from the Turkish administration. Zagorisians had their affairs entrusted to a Council of Elders called Demogerontia (Gr. Δημογεροντία), headed by a president or governor called Vekylis (Gr. Βεκύλης). They maintained a small force of Sipahi horsemen (Gr. σπαχήδες). The Koinon of the Zagorisians was reformalised by a treaty signed in 1670, under which Zagori enjoyed considerable privileges called "Surutia", which were only rescinded by the Sultan in 1868. In the later part of the 17th century, the inhabitants of several hamlets began to resettle in Skamneli. The reason was probably raids from bandits. One major such raid is recorded in the books of the Monastery of St Paraskevi, according to Frangoulis dated to 1688, by one named Ali Chogmeno at the head of 166 men. He gathered the women and children in the Church of the Apostles (Agioi Apostoloi) and began looting the village. Armatoloi arrived from Doliani, another village in Zagori, under their captain Douvlis and dispersed the bandits after killing Ali Chogmeno. At the time Skamneli had about 1000 inhabitants and was surrounded by several hamlets with an additional 800 inhabitants.

In the second half of the 18th century, Skamneli is believed to have had a population of about 950, according to Frangoulis, based on two surviving village records, but other estimates are of up to 800 families for the entire region. It had a school for boys and girls, the Saitzios School, in which Classical Greek was taught. Looms were worked by the women of Skamneli, producing garments, blankets and woolen fabrics. Vikos doctors were active in the area at that time. The foundations of the manors of Skamneli date from this period and were built by masons from Konitsa. During a tour of Mt Tymphe, Ali Pasha was caught in a storm and spent a night in Skamneli at the manor of the Saitzes family, said to have caused his admiration.

In 1820, after the rebellion of Ali Pasha, a Turkish force of 1500 under Ismael Pasha arrived in Zagori, part of the total army of 20,000 sent against Ali Pasha. Alexis Noutsos from Kapesovo, a member of the Philike Hetairia who had intermarried with the Saitzes family and owned a house in Skamneli, was in command of the force opposing Ismael Pasha. However, the Sultan's armies prevailed. Ismael Pasha removed most privileges other than the right to appoint a local governor (Vekylis), whose powers however became nominal. Ismael Pasha introduced very heavy taxation, amounting to 250 silver coins per person and additional taxation in kind. Albanian and local bandits began looting raids once again. This was the time when many prominent Greeks had become members of the Philike Hetairia and were preparing the uprising against the Turks in 1821. The Skamneliot Georgios Papazoglou proposed to the prominent Greek scholar Georgios Gennadios the idea of the establishment of a Greek university at the Saitzios School in Skamneli. Other potential benefactors opted for the site of the Monastery of St John of Rogov, outside nearby Tsepelovo. The idea had also been proposed by Neophytos Doukas, at the time possibly living in Tsepelovo. The plan never materialised because of the limited success of the Greek War of Independence, that left Epirus under Ottoman rule. Georgios' brother Kostas Papazoglou, another member of the Philike Hetairia, left for Missolonghi, where he led and financed a cavalry company during the Greek War of Independence.

Several Skamneliots enlisted in the so-called Sacred Band of Alexander Ypsilantis in the opening phase of the Greek War of Independence and fought in Drăgăşani. The success of the War of Independence was limited. Epirus remained under Ottoman control and Zagori was not included in the Kingdom of Greece formed in 1833. In 1837, during a looting raid by bandits under a man called Vryazis, the bandits found the veteran of the Greek War of Independence Costas Papazoglou in his house in Skamneli and killed him, looting his house. In 1868 Zagori lost its last privileges and Skamneli entered a period of further impoverishment and decline. At that time, so-called "gypsies" settled in Skamneli. They were believed by the locals to have been brought to Europe by the Turks from Asia, and were involved in the making of tools and utensilis and other metalwork, as well as musical instruments. Aromanians near Gyftokampos and Sarakatsani shepherds managed the livestock of the wealthier families. Members of these groups became gradually assimilated into the village society. After the battle of Bizani during the first Balkan War (1912), the inhabitants of Skamneli and Tsepelovo rose up. A Turkish unit subsequently entered the village and set fire to the school and to all the houses whose occupants were absent. The public records of the village also perished. In 1940 villagers from Skamneli and the other villages in the region helped in non-combatant roles the Greek army in turning back the Italian army that had entered Epirus, as commemorated by a memorial in the entrance to the Zagori region. Later Napoleon Zervas established his partizans in the area. The village became almost deserted during the Greek Civil War (1946–9) and more of the older stone houses fell to ruin in the subsequent period. As a result, only a small number of inhabitants still live year-round in the village.

Young Skamneliotes used to study in Ioannina or in Italy and in Constantinople during the Ottoman period and would emigrate for work to Constantinople, Asia Minor, Russia, the Danubian Principalities of Moldova, Wallachia and Bessarabia, in Romania and also to Alexandria in Egypt. More recently there has been emigration also to the United States.

== Demographics ==
The village is inhabited by Greeks, an Aromanian community which has assimilated into the local population, and some Sarakatsani who settled in the village during the early 20th century. The Sarakatsani are Greek speakers.

== Buildings ==
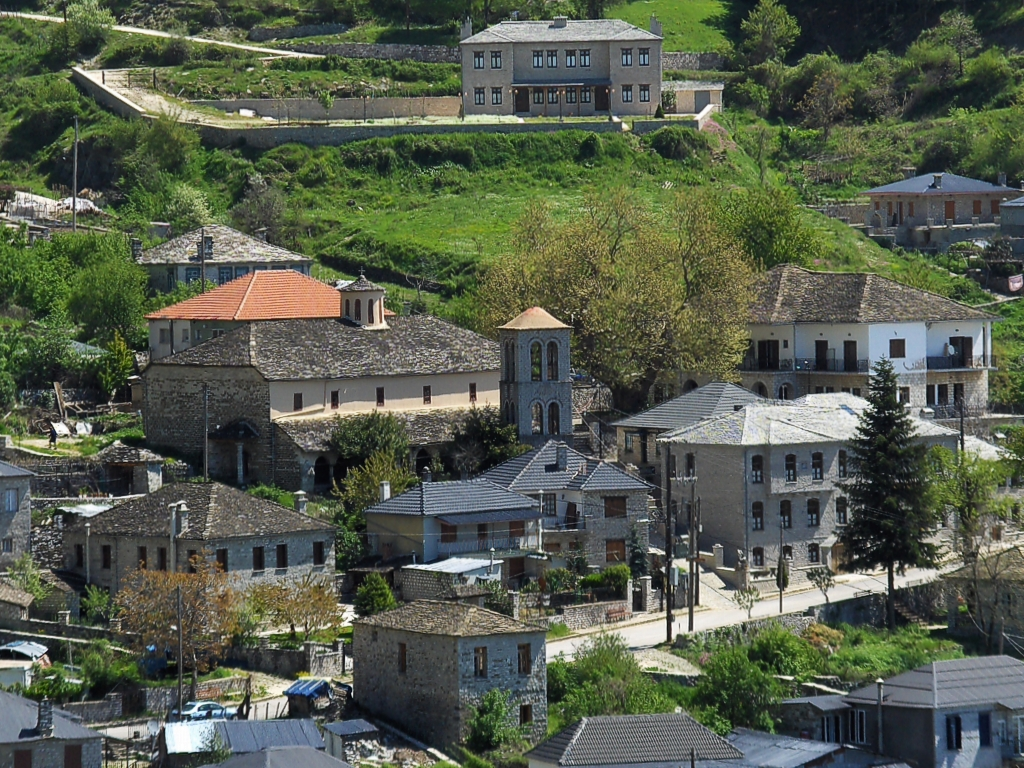
Skamneli, village centre

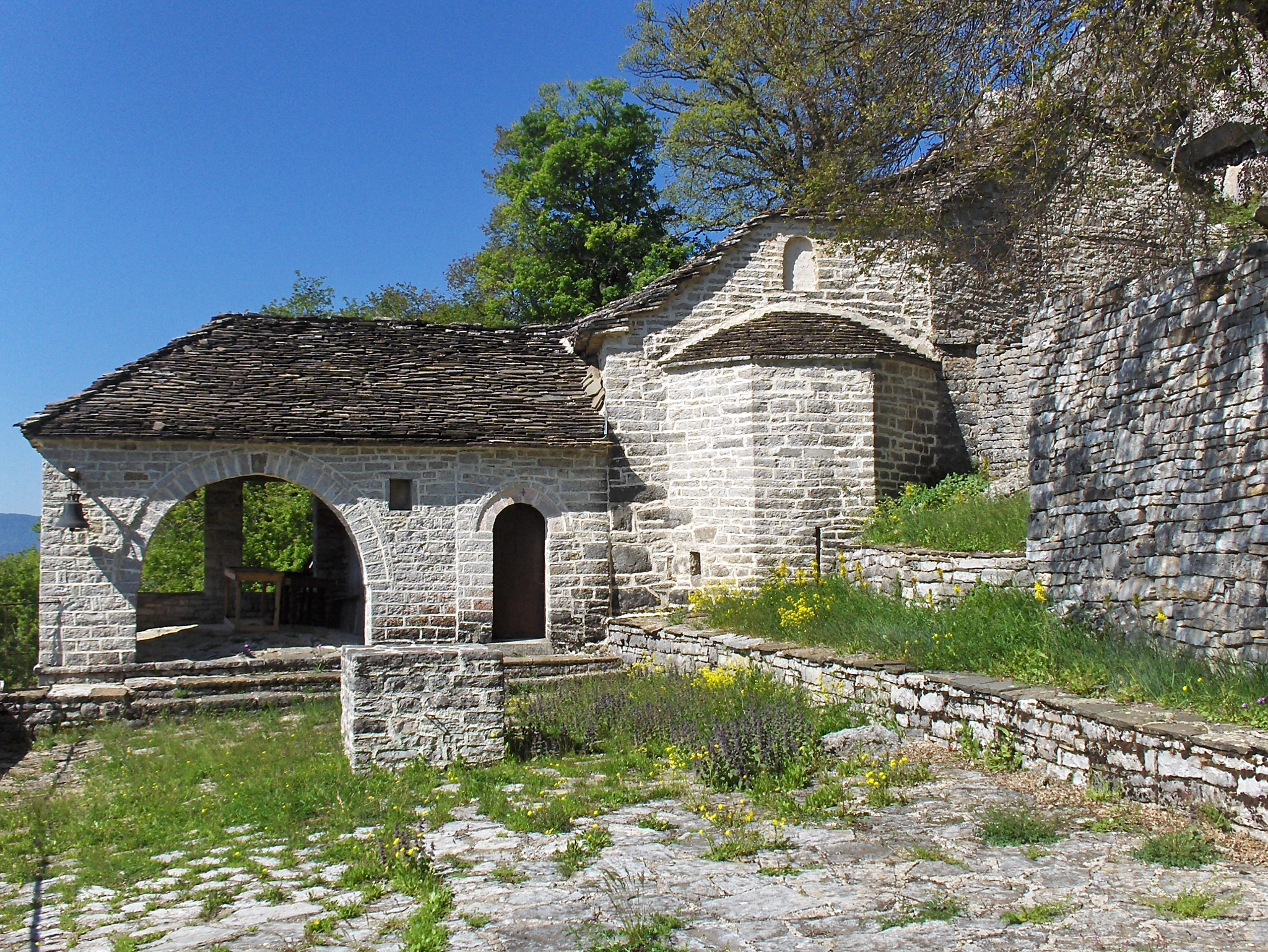
Skamneli, St.Paraskevi

The old school, the Saitzios School (Gr. Σαϊτζιος Σχολή), dated to the 18th C. and possibly older, had been proposed as the foundation for the first university of Modern Greece in 1820. On a subsequent recommendation of the would-be benefactors, the site for the university was moved to the nearby monastery of St John of Rogov (Gr. Μονή Αγίου Ιωάννου του Ρογκοβού). Eventually, following Greek Independence in 1829, Athens was chosen as the site of the first University, which became known as the National and Kapodistrian University of Athens. It was funded partly by benefactors of Zagorisian origin, including Nikolaos Rizaris and Simon Sinas. Nothing remains of the Saitzios School, having been destroyed during the First Balkan War, its stone having been afterwards looted for the building of nearby houses. The house of the last headmaster of the Saitzios School, Constantinos Petrides, was also destroyed together with the school but was rebuilt in 1914 and still stands.

Some of the grander houses, such as those of the Noutsos and Saitzes families, also became ruins and nothing of them has remained. However, there are some old houses still in existence, built in the traditional style of Zagori, notably that of the Gennadios family, near the village square and those of Cyparrisos, Frangoulis and Theodosiou. A unique characteristic of these manors were murals with floral themes covering the interior and they were also characterised by their unique carved wooden ceilings. While the older ceilings are now mostly gone, a very fine example of modern work in the old Scamneliot style can be seen in the hotel "To Rhadio" (το Ραδιό), along the main road, near the church of the Apostles.

The church of the Apostles (Agioi Apostoloi) was built in 1793 next to the village square by a benefaction from two Skamneliots living in the Principalities of Moldavia and Wallachia and in Bessarabia, Demetrios and Christodoulos Saitzes. Ιt has beautiful wooden panelling and is of considerable historical significance as a representative of the style of the period. There used to be two large monasteries near the entrance of Skamneli, that of St Nicholas (Agios Nikolaos) housed monks while that of St Paraskevi (Agia Paraskevi) originally housed nuns. The monastery of St Nicholas dates from 1683. Parts of the monks' quarters, the church and a picturesque roofed well still remain.

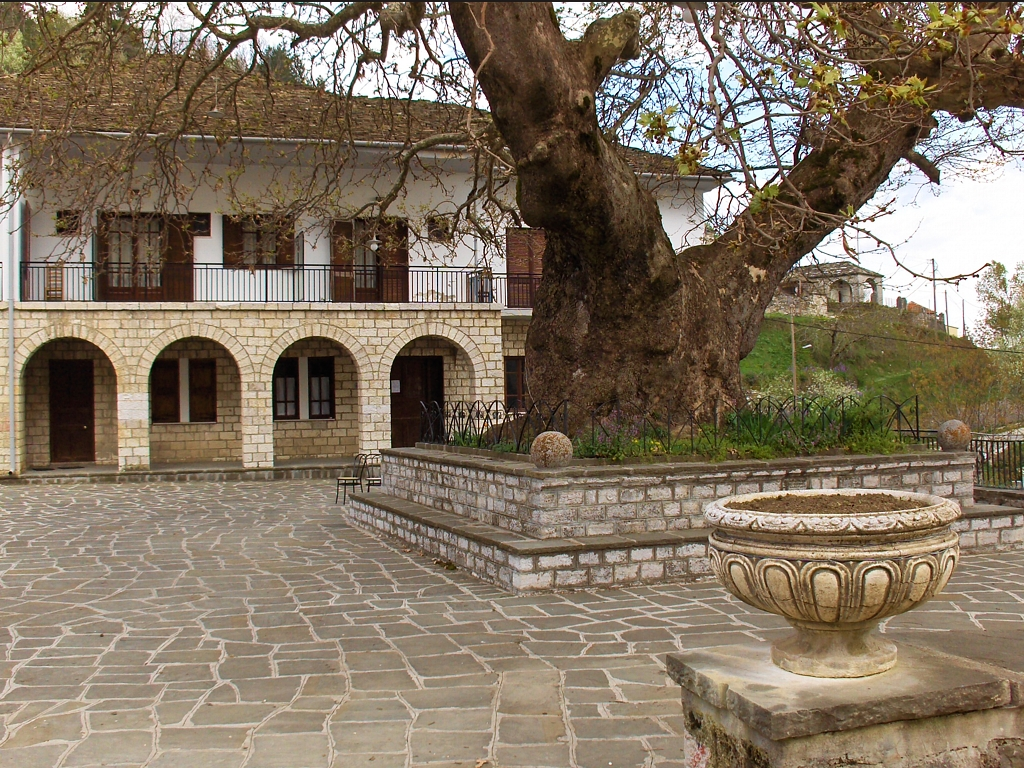
Skamneli village square

The monastery of St Paraskevi (Agia Paraskevi) dates from the 12th or 13th century, as some of the oldest murals suggest, during the period of the Despotate of Epirus. It was founded as a nunnery with 60 nuns. On the record of its last commissioner, it became a Stauropegic monastery in 1453 after the Fall of Constantinople - that is it came under the direct jurisdiction of the Ecumenical Patriarchate of Constantinople - and has remained so ever since. It was refounded in 1697 as a male monastery. Some of the frescoes were painted in 1717 and 1773 by painters from nearby Kapesovo and from Chionades. The exterior fresco mainly around the theme of the Final Judgement was apparently made by a hagiographer from nearby Koukouli. The frail frescoes were restored in 1933 and 1984. The monastery became ruinous and only the central church remains out of the original foundation. Another old church, that of the Panagia (church of the Hyperagia Theotokos or the Dormition of the Theotokos) has suffered from disrepair and, although still standing, had been for decades closed to the public. It has been now repaired and has been re-opened for services. It is believed to have been founded in the 8th C.

== Folklore ==
The village celebrates the Feast of Agia Paraskevi, on the 26th of July, with a local festival.

Near the village lies Gyftokampos, a place of an annual meeting of the Sarakatsani on the first weekend of August. It is also an exhibition ground every year, from May till October, with huts and other representations of the traditional life of the Sarakatsani.

A custom surviving until recently in some villages in the area was a divination referred to as the "amileto nero" (unbespoken water). It involved an offering of water and grain by adolescent girls, relating to an ancient Demetriac festival of the month of Gamelion. Reputedly, the springwater mourmoured an omen, usually relating to the girl's future marital life.

According to Odysseas Frangoulis, St Cosmas (Kosmas Aitolos or Cosmas of Aetolia) preached in Skamneli outside the monastery of Agios Nikolaos. He prophesied "when you see here many horses gathered, the Romioi are coming". When the village was burnt in 1912 by the retreating Turks, they had left their horses outside the monastery.

== Wedding customs ==
Weddings in former times were governed by tradition. Following engagement, and an exchange of rings, it was customary for a young Skamneliot to follow a more experienced elder abroad for work or study. They paid irregular visits to Skamneli, following the local maxim "do not visit your home often, so that you are filled with constant longing". Friends of the bride would gather nightly to knit the dowry. The final preparations and the feast were the groom's duty. On the Thursday before the wedding, boys and girls carried the dowry to the groom's house. On the eve of the wedding, bread was baked and children were sent to the houses of the groom and the bride to summon them. The bride, upon leaving her family home would break a pitcher, spilling its contents of water and grains of wheat to the ground, so that not all good fortune left her parents' home. The bride would set out on a white horse, wearing a knitted vest over a gilded dress held together by a golden waistband decorated with florins. In more recent times the dress was white on the day of the wedding but the young bride was dressed in a black silken dress on the second day. Arriving at the groom's house with her companions (fylachtades), she would have to overcome gracefully some obstacle, the nature of which was kept secret. Much tutoring was made in advance, so that she might deal with any problem and gain respect and admiration. After the wedding, always on a Sunday, there was a feast with music by Epirotan musicians. The family would lead the dance and the newlyweds would join last. It was the responsibility of the leader of the ceremonies, called Vlamis (the best man), to fulfill the requests of the guests regarding food. Feasts would often take place in the open area of Selio south of the village or in the fountain of Goura above the village. Wedding celebrations would last for three days. In the second day, the married couple would go to a water fountain, often a place of trysts for young lovers. The bride would let her water pitcher fall and break. She would then sing a song:

"If you go to the fountain for water,
I will be hiding there;
I will break your pitcher,
So that you return to your mother empty handed."
"My mother, I lost my footing
and I broke my pitcher."
"It was not a loss of footing,
It was a man's embracing."

Before leaving the fountain, the bride would throw a few coins in it. The dancing and merry-making would continue until the third day and would end with words from the bride's parents to the effect "we brought you a bride, we brightened your house". These wedding customs are no longer practiced as only a few inhabitants remain year-round in Skamneli.

== Prominent Skamneliots ==
Adam Gorgidas, a professor of medicine at the University of Budapest, member of the Philike Etairia (Filiki Eteria) translated in 1849 the Encheiridion of Practical Pathology of D.P. Frank into Greek.

Skamneli also is the birthplace of the national benefactor Angeliki Papazoglou (c. 1810–1891). Among else, she provided the funds for the building of a library for the University of Athens and built a school for girls in Ioannina, the Papazogleios. The building has been acquired by the University of Ioannina to house its School of Architecture.

Georgios Perides was the first director of a Greek School in Proussa (modern Bursa, Turkey), which he co-founded c. 1860.

Georgios Sinas, Director of the Bank of Austria for 25 years, was a national benefactor, responsible for the building of the National Astronomical Observatory in Athens and was among the first trustees of the Bank of Greece after Greek independence. He was born in Moschopolis of Northern Epirus and was of Skamneliot descent.

Simon Sinas, baron, son of Georgios Sinas, was a Greek Consul in Vienna. He funded the building of the Academy of Athens, the Senate House of the University of Athens.
