= Leptokarya, Ioannina =

Leptokarya Λεπτοκαρυά
- Community
- Location within Greece
- Coordinates: 39°49′25″N 20°54′45″E
- Country: Greece
- Administrative region: Epirus
- Regional unit: Ioannina
- Municipality: Zagori
- Municipal unit: Tymfi
- Elevation: 1,058 m (3,471 ft)

Population (2021)
  - Community: 43
- Time zone: UTC+2 (EET)
  - Summer (DST): UTC+3 (EEST)

Leptokarya (Greek: Λεπτοκαρυά, before 1927: Λιασκοβέτσι, Liaskovetsi; Aromanian: Liascovets) is a settlement in Ioannina regional unit, Epirus, Greece.

== Name ==
The village is abundant in wild hazel bushes. Linguists Max Vasmer and Demetrius Georgacas derived the toponym from Old Slavic Lěskovьcь, stemming from Old Church Slavonic lěskovъ, derived from lěska 'hazel, hazel bush' and the adjectival ending -ovъ, with the suffix -ьcь and the rendering of the Slavic ě and ь as ia and e in Greek.

== Demographics ==
The village is inhabited by Greeks, and an Aromanian community along with Arvanite families who both have assimilated into the local population. The arrival of Orthodox Albanians (locally called "Arvanites") occurred in the modern period and originate from the wider Souli area in central Greek Epirus.

== See also ==
- List of settlements in the Ioannina regional unit
