= Fragkades =

Fragkades Φραγκάδες
- Community
- Location within Greece
- Coordinates: 39°49′49″N 20°52′56″E
- Country: Greece
- Administrative region: Epirus
- Regional unit: Ioannina
- Municipality: Zagori
- Municipal unit: Tymfi
- Elevation: 1,020 m (3,350 ft)

Population (2021)
  - Community: 69
- Time zone: UTC+2 (EET)
  - Summer (DST): UTC+3 (EEST)

Fragkades (Greek: Φραγκάδες, Aromanian: Frinci) is a settlement in Ioannina regional unit, Epirus, Greece.

== Name ==
The toponym stems from the surname Frangos and the Greek family ending -ades, comparable to suffixes with -as. The surname Frangos is from the ethnic term Frangos meaning 'foreigner, not native' or 'Catholic, not Orthodox', a medieval borrowing in Greek from the Latin Francus.

== History ==
The village was settled by the inhabitants of the now deserted villages: Tsanades, Strombetsiko, Christoforo and Linou.

== Demographics ==
The village is inhabited by Greeks, and an Aromanian community which has assimilated into the local population.

== See also ==
- List of settlements in the Ioannina regional unit
