= Konstantinos Rados =

Konstantinos Rados (Greek: Κωνσταντίνος Ράδος, 1785-1865) was a Greek merchant and member of the Filiki Eteria, a secret organization whose purpose was to overthrow the Ottoman rule of Greece. He took part in the Greek War of Independence against the Ottomans and during the governance of Ioannis Kapodistrias he held important administrative positions.

== Biography ==
He was born in Tsepelovo, Epirus in 1785 and studied at schools of Ioannina and Pisa. He was the father of lawyer Nikolaos Rados and the grandfather of professor Konstantinos Rados, who served as a curator at the National Historical Museum in Athens and president of the Historical and Ethnological Society of Greece.

He was initiated into Carbonarism, bringing his knowledge of Carbonari practices into the Filiki Eteria when he became a member. After the Greek War of Independence began, in 1822 he took part in the battle in Styra alongside Ilias Mavromichalis and Vasos Mavrovouniotis, but they were defeated by the Ottoman army of Omer Bey. Before and during the governance of Ioannis Kapodistrias he held important administrative positions. More specifically, Konstantinos Rados served as Provincial Governor of Andros (1822-1824), Provincial Governor of Tripolitsa (1825), provisional Governor of Nafplio (1828-1829) and Temporary Commissioner of Western Greece (1830-1831). In 1831 he withdrew from his administrative duties after the assassination of Kapodistrias. He was receiving a small pension for his contribution to the war, which his wife continued to take after his death in 865.

The frequent correspondence between Rados and Kapodistrias, together with the fact that Viaros Kapodistrias asked Rados to confirm the news of his brother’s death, proves that the relationship between them wasn’t just formal, but deeper and more meaningful.

== Bibliography ==
- Δελτίον της Ι.Ε.Ε.Ε., Πρακτικά των ετών 1899-1903, vol. 6 (ΣΤ΄), Ιστορική και Εθνολογική Εταιρεία της Ελλάδος, Αθήνα, 1901.
- Μεγάλη Ελληνική Εγκυκλοπαίδεια Παύλου Δρανδάκη, vol. 21 (ΚΑ΄), Εκδοτικός Οργανισμός «Ο Φοίνιξ»
- Τεκμήρια Ιστορίας- Μονογραφίες, Ιστορική Εθνολογική Εταιρεία Ελλάδος, Αθήνα 2010.
- Υπογραφές Αγωνιστών της Ελληνικής Επαναστάσεως, Ιστορική και Εθνολογική Εταιρεία της Ελλάδος, Αθήνα, 1998.
