= Kapesovo =

Kapesovo Καπέσοβο
- Community
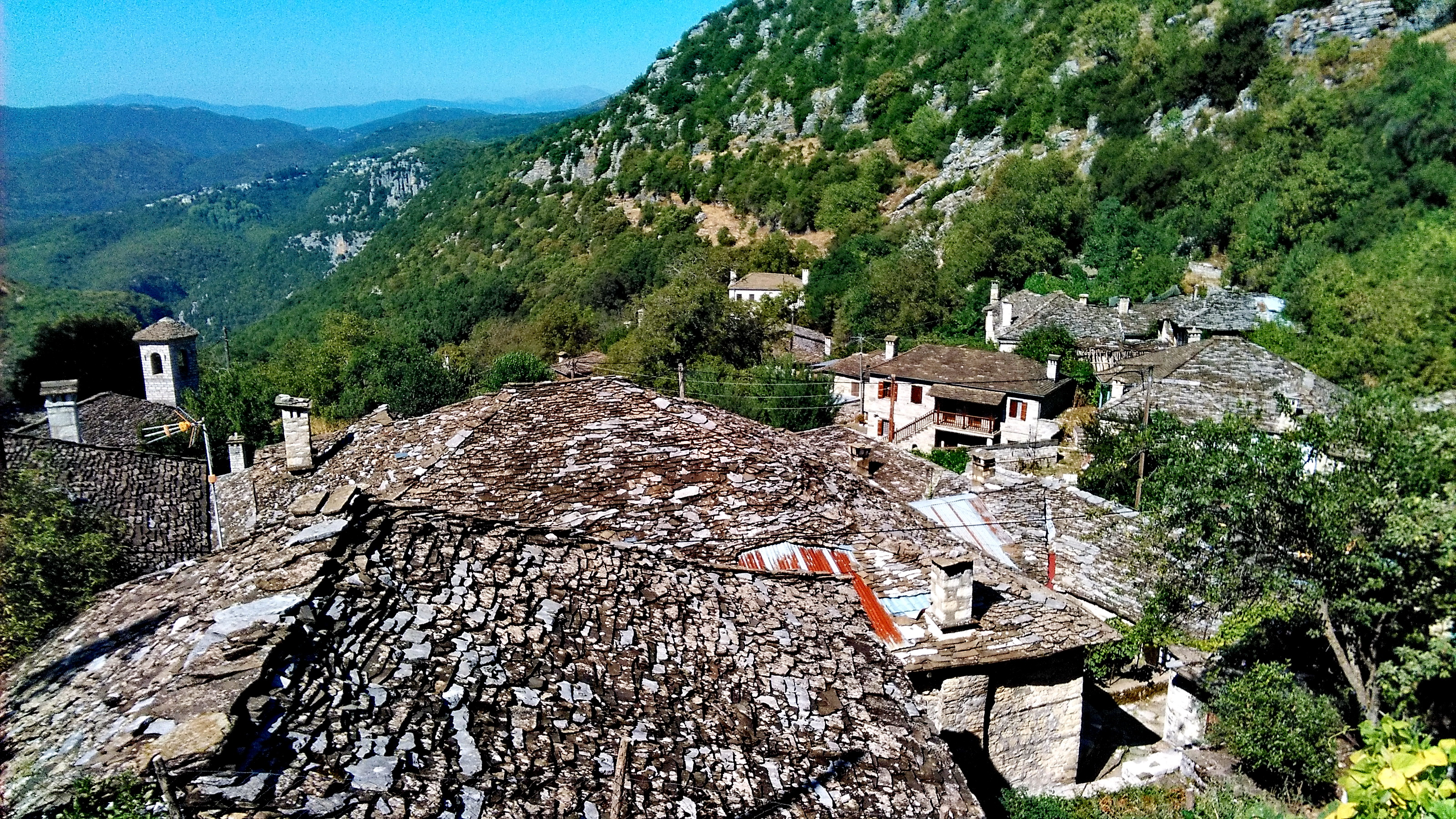
- Kapesovo

- Location within Greece
- Coordinates: 39°53.3′N 20°46.8′E
- Country: Greece
- Administrative region: Epirus
- Regional unit: Ioannina
- Municipality: Zagori
- Municipal unit: Tymfi

Population (2021)
  - Community: 30
- Time zone: UTC+2 (EET)
  - Summer (DST): UTC+3 (EEST)
- Vehicle registration: ΙΝ

Kapesovo (Greek: Καπέσοβο) is a village in the Zagori region (Epirus region), it is 43 km north of Ioannina. The village is near the Vikos canyon, the view of which is spectacular at certain spots.

== Name ==
The scholar Ioannis Lambridis shortens the place name to the Slavic koupouz, in reference to kapusъ 'turnip', an etymology the linguist Kostas Oikonomou stated shows phonetic difficulties, such as u becoming e, ъ into o, and thus should be rejected. The linguist Max Vasmer wrote about a non-existent form, Kepesovo, and considered it a Slavic formation due to the suffix -ovo from a proper noun he links to the Uyghur word käbäs 'proud', a relationship which Oikonomou considered unlikely. The linguist Yordan Zaimov accepted the absence of the Uyghur personal name käbäs in Bulgarian and instead linked the toponym with the Bulgarian kapeš from kapa, 'drop', and the suffix -eš.

Oikonomou said the Slavic-origin suffix -оvо became productive in several other languages and it is not mandatory to trace every -оvо formation back to Slavic languages. In this instance, Oikonomou stated the placename is derived from the surname Kapesis, also Kapetsis, and the Slavic-origin ending -ovo which became productive in Greek.

== History ==
The village was established in the 16th century. In the 18th and 19th centuries Kapesovo was renowned in Epirus for its painters, called Bogades (Greek: Μπογάδες), that worked in dozens of churches from Moscopole to Arta.

Kapesovo experienced a great flourishing until 1860 and this is evident in the great manors with folk wall paintings and churches with paintings (hagiographies) in their interior. The church of Aghios Nikolaos, built in 1793, the cultural center and the folkloric museum are some of the village's attractions. In the Paschaleios School, found at 1861, by Konstantinos and Pavlos Paschalis, is kept today one of the four copies of Rigas Fereos chart.

Out of the village is a cobble stone pathway down a steep rocky slope that leads to nearby Vradeto. The pathway is a work of great craftsmanship of Epirotic artisans. Outside of the village, close to Kipoi village is the famous bridge of Kalogeriko or Plakidas.

The first census of the village took place in 1928, 124 people were counted then. In the 2011 census only 51 people were counted living in the village.

The Kapesovites used to migrate mostly to Egypt and the U.S. In Greece, they migrated to Macedonia and Athens.

== Demographics ==
The village is inhabited by Greeks. Linguist Thede Kahl describes the village as also being possibly settled by Arvanite families who assimilated into the local population. The arrival of Orthodox Albanians (locally called "Arvanites") in Zagori occurred in the modern period and originate from the wider Souli area in central Greek Epirus.

== Personalities ==
- Konstantinos and Pavlos Paschalis, merchants and benefactors.
- Alexis Noutsos, advisor of Ali Pasha.
- Ioannoutsos Karamesinis, general governor of the 'League of Zagori', 19th century.

== Gallery ==
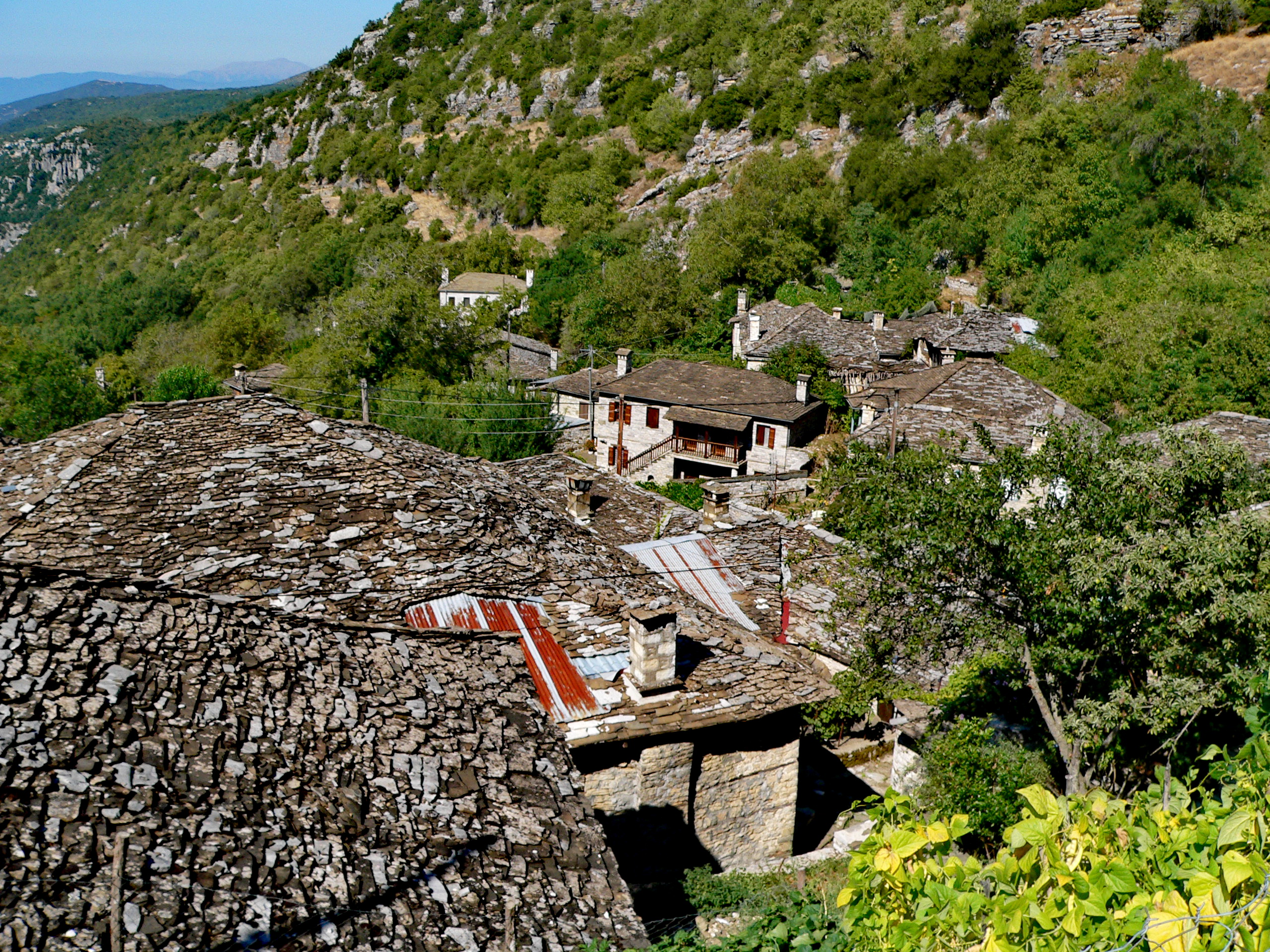
Partial view of Kapesovo.

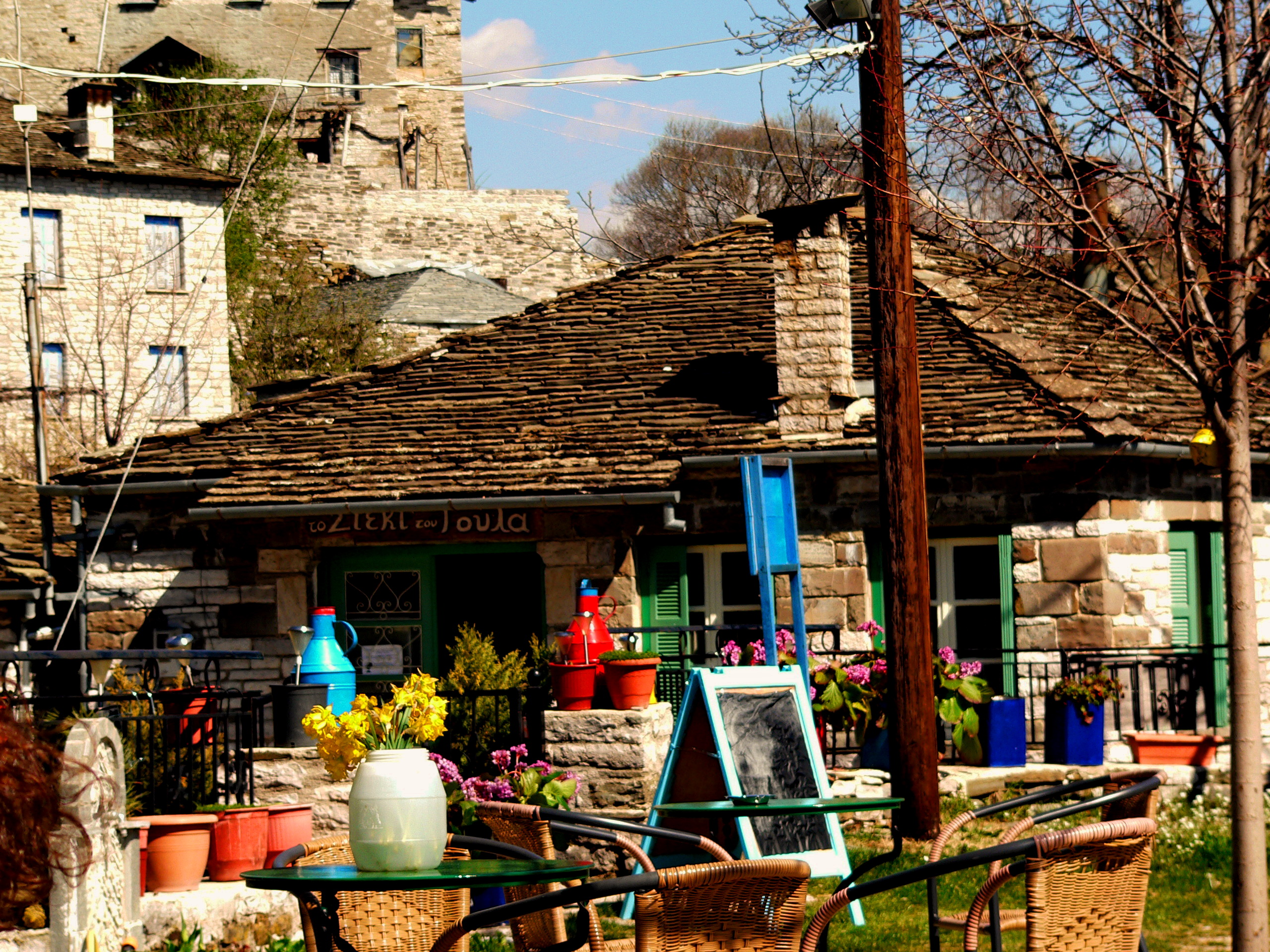
Partial view of Kapesovo's square.

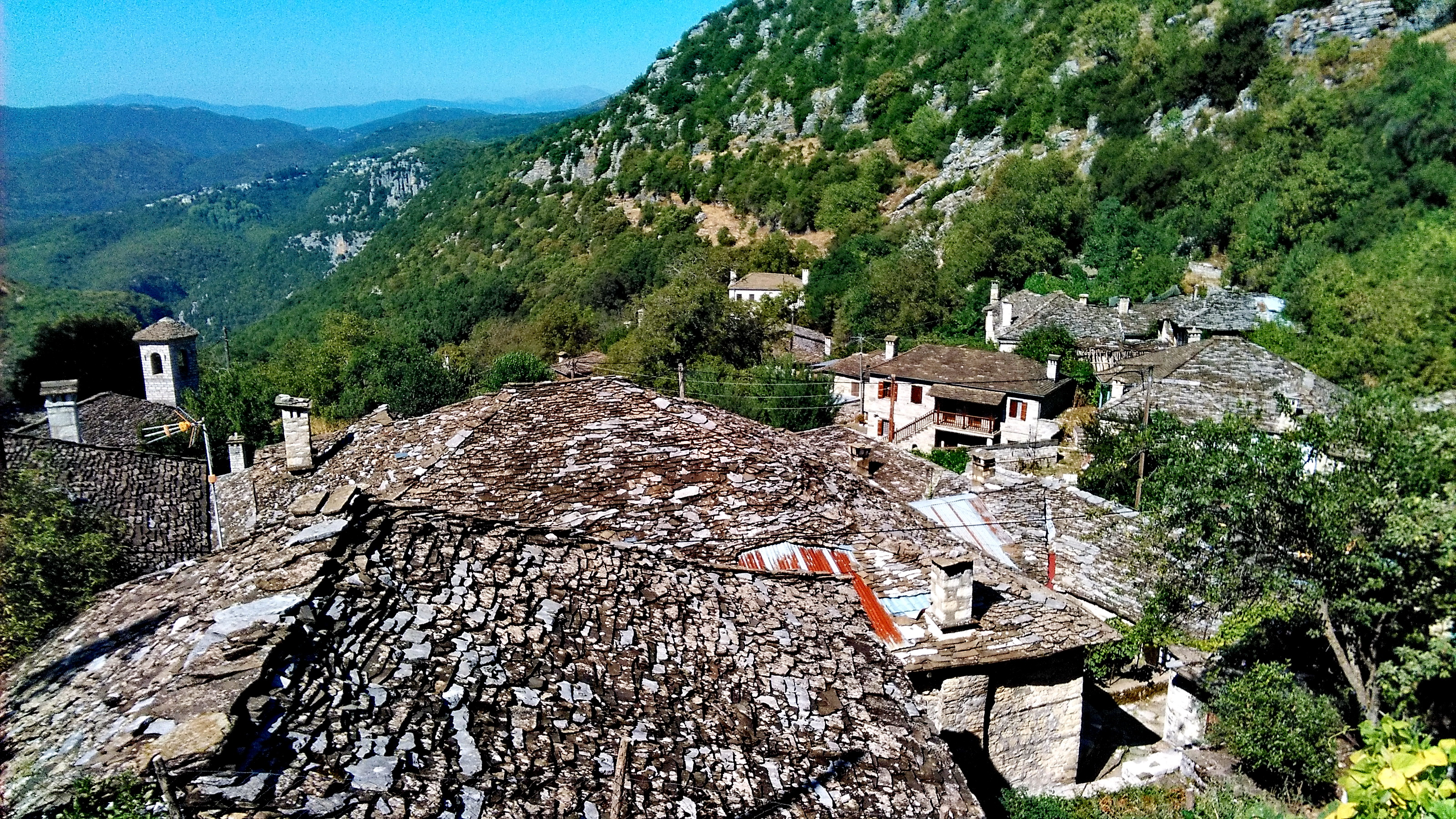
Partial view of Kapesovo.

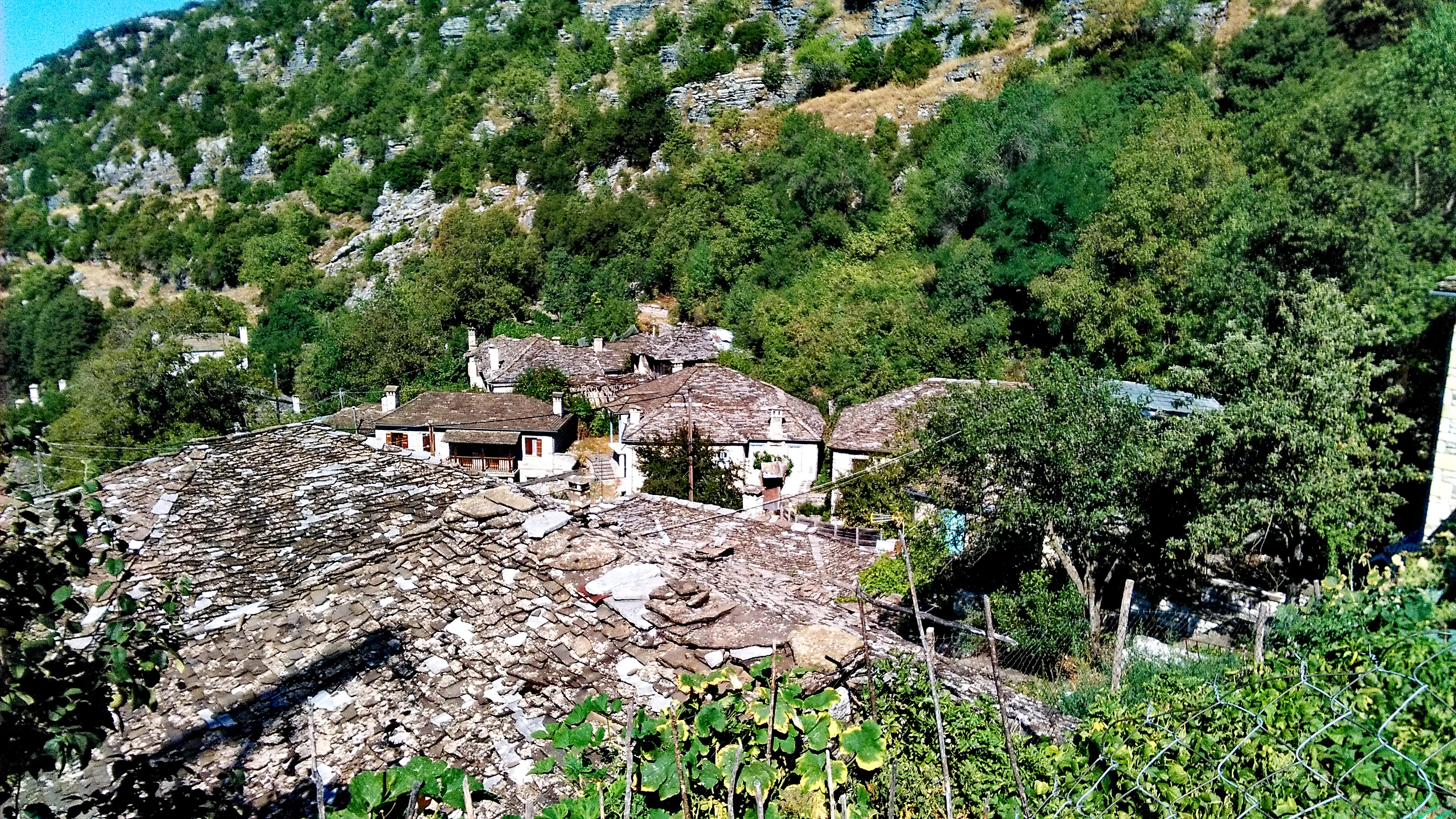
Partial view of Kapesovo.

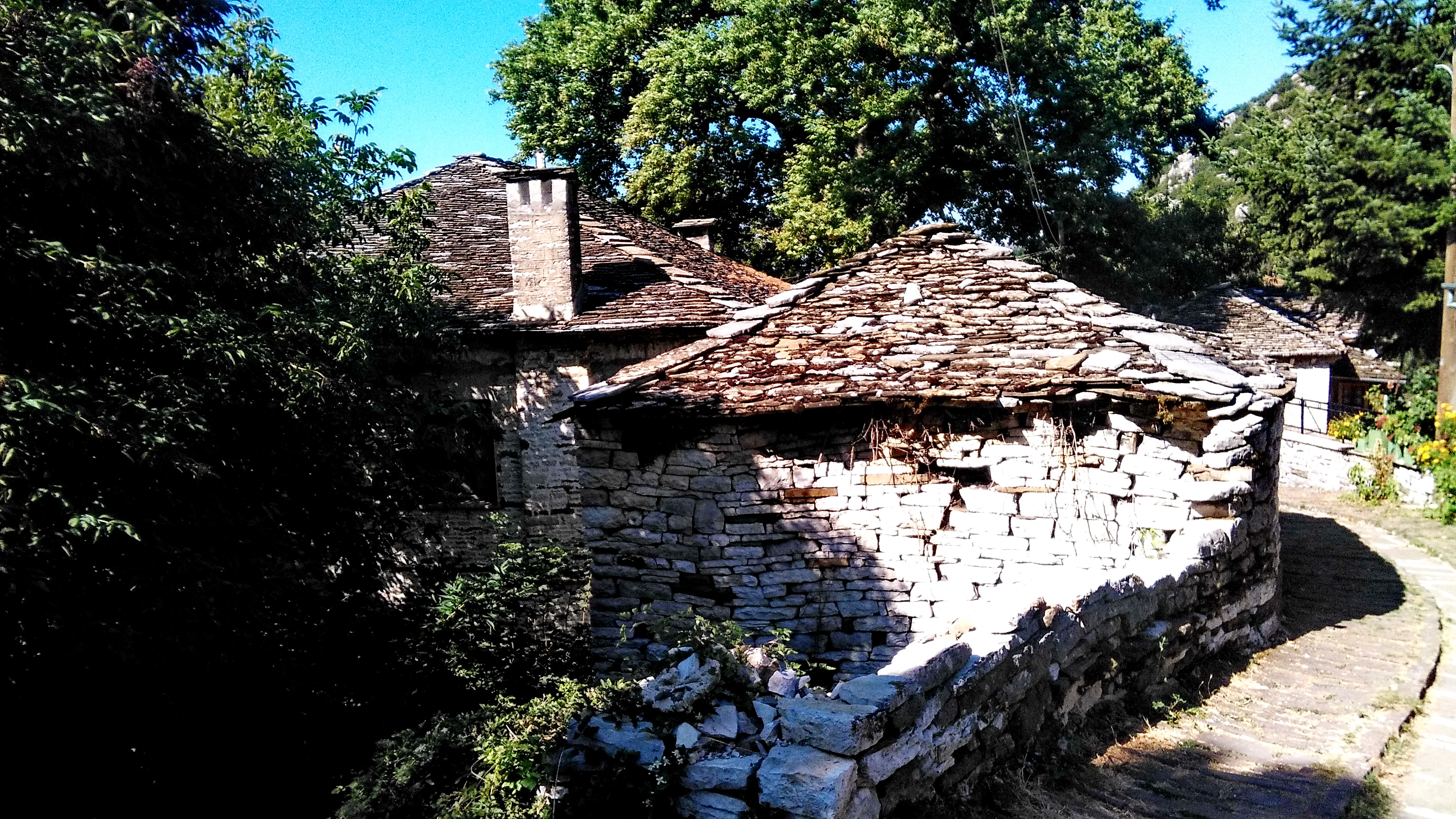
Partial view of Kapesovo.

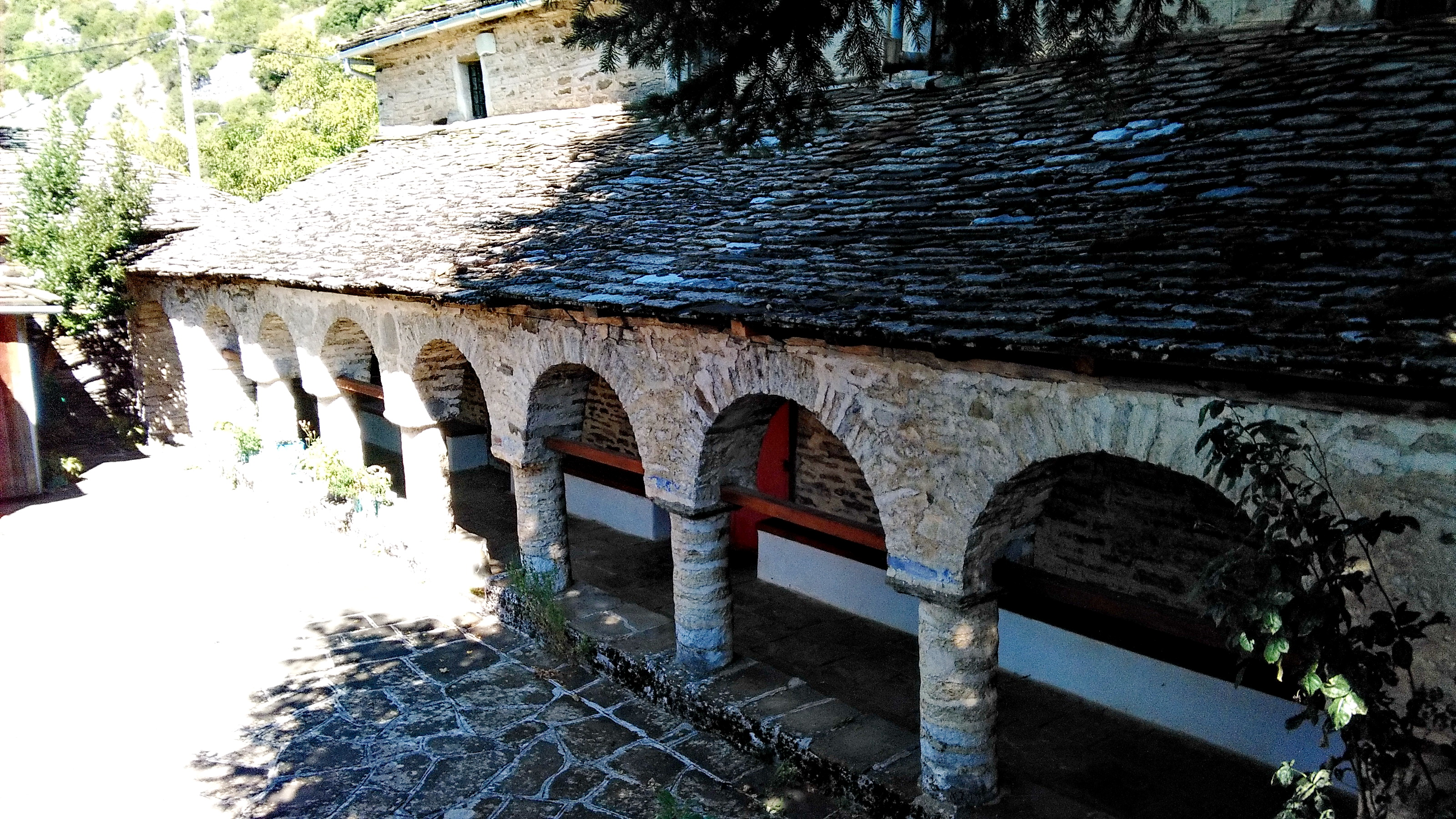
Christian Orthodox temple in the village.

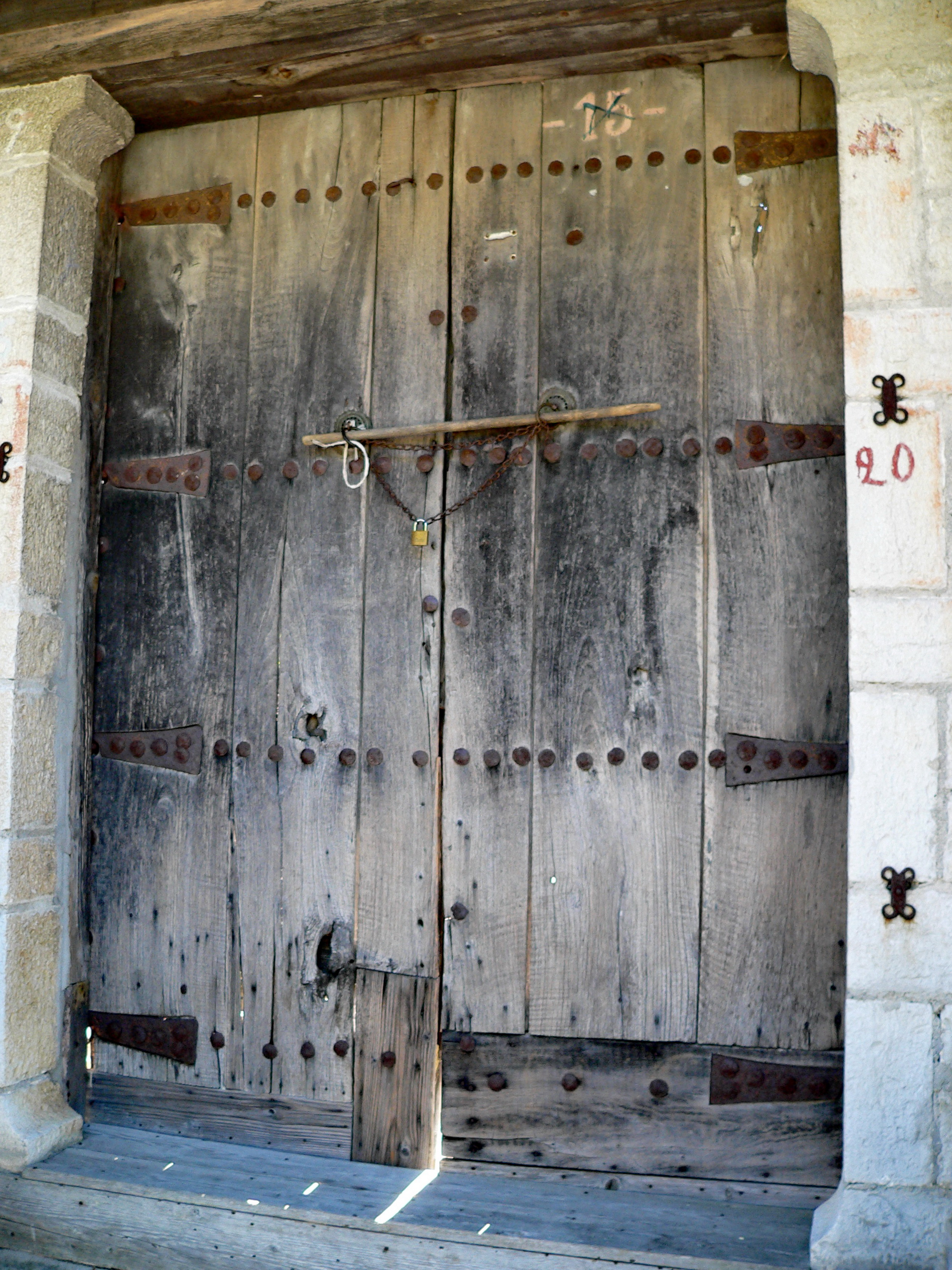
An old door in the village.

== Sources ==
- Prefecture of Ioannina. Tourist department of Greece
