= List of bridges in Greece =

This list of bridges in Greece lists bridges of particular historical, scenic, architectural or engineering interest. Road and railway bridges, viaducts, aqueducts and footbridges are included.

== Historical and architectural interest bridges ==
	Name	Greek	Distinction	Length	Type	Carries Crosses	Opened	Location	Region	Ref.
1	Arkadiko Bridge	Γέφυρα του Αρκαδικού	One of the oldest bridges still in existence	11.5 m (38 ft)	Masonry; Corbelled vault, large limestone blocks, dry stone	Footbridge	13th century BC	Arkadiko; 37°35′37.0″N 22°56′15.1″E	Peloponnese	
2	Petrogephyri Bridge	Γέφυρα Πετρογεφύρι	One of the oldest bridges still in existence	14.5 m (48 ft)	Masonry; Corbelled vault, large limestone blocks, dry stone	Footbridge	13th century BC	Arkadiko; 37°35′27.3″N 22°55′36.1″E	Peloponnese	
3	Brauron Antique Stone Bridge	Γέφυρα της Βραυρώνας	Only Classical Greece bridge still in good conditions	9 m (30 ft)	Clapper bridge	Footbridge; Erasinos	5th century BC	Brauron; 37°55′34.9″N 23°59′36.3″E	Attica	
4	Rhodes Footbridge		Oldest known Greek bridge with a voussoir arch	2.8 m (9.2 ft)	Masonry; 1 arch, poros stone	Footbridge	4th century BC	Rhodes; 36°26′29″N 28°13′57″E	South Aegean	
5	Eleutherna Bridge	Γέφυρα Ελεύθερνα		9 m (30 ft)	Masonry; Triangular corbelled vault, limestone	Footbridge; Pharangitis; Chalopota	3rd century BC	Eleutherna; 35°20′17.7″N 24°40′13.7″E	Crete	
6	Moria Aqueduct	Ρωμαϊκό Υδραγωγείο Μορίας		170 m (560 ft)	Masonry; 2 levels, 17 semi-circular arches	Aqueduct	2nd century BC	Mória; 39°07′34.1″N 26°30′53.2″E	North Aegean	
7	Roman bridge of Patras	Ρωμαϊκή γέφυρα Πάτρας			Masonry; 2 semi-circular arches	Meilichos or Kallinaos	3rd century	Patras; 38°16′02.0″N 21°45′19.0″E	Western Greece	
8	Kleidi Roman Bridge	Ρωμαϊκη Γέφυρα στο Κλειδί		190 m (620 ft)	Masonry; 8 or 10 arches originally	Loudias		Kleidi; 40°34′26.4″N 22°37′20.9″E	Central Macedonia	
9	Portaikos Bridge	Γέφυρα του Πορταϊκού	Span : 28 m (92 ft)	67 m (220 ft)	Masonry; 1 semi-circular arch	Footbridge; Portaikos River	1514	Pyli; 39°27′37.7″N 21°36′01.7″E	Thessaly	
10	Aqueduct of Kavala	Αρχαίο υδραγωγείο στην Καβάλα		270 m (890 ft)	Masonry	Aqueduct	1530	Kavala; 40°56′13.5″N 24°24′55.7″E	Eastern Macedonia and Thrace	
11	Korakou Bridge destroyed in 1949	Γεφυρα Κορακου	Span : 45 m (148 ft)	62 m (203 ft)	Masonry; 1 segmental arch	Footbridge; Achelous River	1540	Pigés; 39°17′53.7″N 21°25′02.3″E	Epirus	
12	Bridge of Arta	Γέφυρα της Άρτας	Span : 24 m (79 ft)	130 m (430 ft)	Masonry; 4 semi-circular arches	Footbridge; Arachthos	1612	Arta; 39°09′06.6″N 20°58′29.1″E	Epirus	
13	Manolis Stone Bridge submerged until 1969	Γέφυρα του Μανώλη			Masonry; 1 pointed arch	Agrafiotis; Kremasta Lake	1659	Agrafa; 38°58′44.1″N 21°33′42.6″E	Central Greece	
14	Misios Bridge	Γέφυρα Μίσιου		37 m (121 ft)	Masonry; 1 semi-circular arch	Footbridge; Voidomatis	1748	Tsepelovo; 39°52′09.6″N 20°45′52.7″E	Epirus	
15	Kokkoris Bridge	Γέφυρα Κόκκορη ή Νούτσου	Span : 23.6 m (77 ft)	36 m (118 ft)	Masonry; 1 semi-circular arch	Footbridge; Voidomatis	1750	Kipoi–Koukouli; 39°51′43.6″N 20°46′29.9″E	Epirus	
16	Kompsatos Bridge partially destroyed	Γεφύρι Κομψάτος	Span : 21.8 m (72 ft)	70 m (230 ft)	Masonry; 2 semi-circular arches (3 originally)	Footbridge; Kompsatos	18th century	Iasmos; 41°08′28.1″N 25°12′38.0″E	Eastern Macedonia and Thrace	
17	De Bosset Bridge	Γέφυρα Ντε Μποσέ		690 m (2,260 ft)	Masonry; 3 arches (1 main semi-circular)	Former road bridge Footbridge; Bay of Argostoli	1813	Argostoli; 38°10′31.8″N 20°29′45.3″E	Ionian Islands	
18	Kalogeriko Bridge	Γέφυρα του Πλακίδα ή Καλογερικό		56 m (184 ft)	Masonry; 3 semi-circular arches	Footbridge; Vikos	1814	Koukouli; 39°51′42.1″N 20°47′10.7″E	Epirus	
19	Kleidonia Bridge	Γεφύρι της Κλειδωνιάς ή του Βοϊδομάτη			Masonry; 1 arch	Footbridge; Voidomatis	1853	Kleidonia; 39°58′04.2″N 20°39′48.1″E	Epirus	
20	Plaka Bridge	Γέφυρα Πλάκας	Historic monument Span : 40 m (130 ft)	72 m (236 ft)	Masonry; 3 arches (1 main semi-circular)	Footbridge; Arachthos	1866	Frásta; 39°27′38.1″N 21°01′48.4″E	Epirus	
21	Konitsa Bridge	Γεφύρι της Κόνιτσας	Span : 35.6 m (117 ft)		Masonry; 1 arch	Footbridge; Vjosa	1870	Konitsa; 40°02′11.2″N 20°44′42.5″E	Epirus	
22	Gorgopotamos Bridge	Γέφυρα του Γοργοποτάμου		211 m (692 ft)	Truss; Steel, 4 masonry piles, 2 steel truss piles	Railway bridge Gorgopotamos	1905	Gorgopotamos; 38°49′50.7″N 22°23′22.1″E	Central Greece	
23	Aradena Bridge	Γέφυρα Αραδαίνας	Bungee jumping spot Height : 138 m (453 ft)	84 m (276 ft)	Truss; Steel; Bailey bridge	Road bridge Aradéna Gorge	1986	Anópoli; 35°13′21.4″N 24°03′43.3″E	Crete	
24	Katehaki Pedestrian Bridge	Γέφυρα Κατεχάκη	Designed by Santiago Calatrava	94 m (308 ft)	Cable-stayed; Steel deck and pylon	Footbridge; National Road 54	2004	Athens; 37°59′36.2″N 23°46′34.5″E	Attica	
25	Isthmia Bridge	Γέφυρα Ισθμού	Submersible bridge		Beam bridge Steel	Road bridge Corinth Canal	1988	Isthmia; 37°55′05.5″N 23°00′25.1″E	Peloponnese	
26	Poseidonia Bridge	Γέφυρα Ποσειδωνία	Submersible bridge		Beam bridge Steel	Road bridge Corinth Canal		Corinth; 37°57′00.3″N 22°57′44.6″E	Peloponnese	
27	Ntempriz Bridge	Γέφυρα Ντεμπρίζ	Built during Francocracy		Masonry; 2 spans	Carriage bridge Velikas river		Messinia; 37°03′19.3″N 21°52′29.7″E	Peloponnese	
28	Doukissis Plakentias Bridge	Γέφυρα Δουκίσσης Πλακεντίας ή Πέντε Καμάρες	Built by Duchess of Plaisance		Pentelic Marble; 5 spans	Road bridge Chalandri Stream		Melissia; 38°02′44.0″N 23°50′05.5″E	Attica	
28	Bridge of Petsios	Γεφύρι Του Πέτσου	Built during Ottoman Empire	23.70 meters		Footbridge		Iliochori; 39°58′50″N 20°54′38″E	Epirus	

== Major road and railway bridges ==
This table presents the structures with spans greater than 100 meters (non-exhaustive list).

	Name	Greek	Span	Length	Type	Carries Crosses	Opened	Location	Region	Ref.
1	Rio–Antirrio Bridge	Γέφυρα Ρίου-Αντίρριου	560 m (1,840 ft)(x3)	2,883 m (9,459 ft)	Cable-stayed; Composite steel/concrete deck, 4 concrete pylons 286+3x560+286	A5 motorway (E55/E65); Gulf of Corinth	2004	Rio–Antirrio; 38°19′13.3″N 21°46′23.4″E	Western Greece	
2	Tsakona Arch Bridge	Τοξωτή Γέφυρα Τσακώνας	300 m (980 ft)	490 m (1,610 ft)	Arch; Steel through arch	A7 motorway (E65); Tsakona Valley	2016	Megalopolis; 37°17′44.5″N 22°01′32.3″E	Peloponnese	
3	Metsovitikos Bridge	Γέφυρα Μετσοβίτικου	235 m (771 ft)	537 m (1,762 ft)	Box girder Prestressed concrete Twin bridges 118+235+140	A2 motorway (E90); Metsovitikos	2008	Metsovo; 39°45′29.1″N 21°10′41.0″E	Epirus	(Note: The first design of the Metsovitikos was a towerless suspension bridge between steep-sided mountains on either side of the Metsovitikos River 150 metres (490 ft) above water level. The single span of 565 metres (1,854 ft) would be the largest of its kind at this time.)
4	Votonosi Bridge	Γέφυρα Βοτονοσίου	230 m (750 ft)	490 m (1,610 ft)	Box girder Prestressed concrete Twin bridges 130+230+130	A2 motorway (E90); Metsovitikos	2004	Metsovo; 39°45′26.7″N 21°07′30.3″E	Epirus	
5	Euripus Bridge	Γέφυρα Ευρίπου	215 m (705 ft)	694 m (2,277 ft)	Cable-stayed; Concrete deck and pylons 90+215+90	Chalcis Regional; Euripus Strait	1992	Chalcis; 38°26′41.7″N 23°35′28.0″E	Central Greece	
6	Tatarna Bridge	Γέφυρα Τατάρνας	196 m (643 ft)	437 m (1,434 ft)	Box girder Prestressed concrete 150+196+97	Road bridge Achelous River; Kremasta Lake	1973	Triklino; 38°58′13.9″N 21°29′28.9″E	Western Greece; Central Greece	
7	Nedondas Bridge	Γέφυρα Νέδοντα	162 m (531 ft)		Box girder Prestressed concrete Twin bridges	A7 motorway Nedonas	2013	Kalamata; 37°03′06.4″N 22°07′21.1″E	Peloponnese	
8	Malakasi-Grevena Bridge		160 m (520 ft)	349 m (1,145 ft)	Box girder Prestressed concrete Twin bridges 94+160+94	A2 motorway (E90)		Malakasi; 39°48′57.6″N 21°19′21.0″E	Thessaly	
9	T9-T11 Bridge (A2)	Γέφυρα Τ9-Τ11	155 m (509 ft)	409 m (1,342 ft)	Box girder Prestressed concrete Twin bridges 105+155+105	A2 motorway (E90)	2010	Egnatia; 39°44′05.5″N 21°03′00.4″E	Epirus	
10	Ekkara Railway Bridge (SG26)	Σιδηροδρομική Γέφυρα Εκκάρας (ΣΓ26)	151 m (495 ft)	405 m (1,329 ft)	Arch; Steel tied arch Bow-string bridge	Piraeus–Platy railway	2018	Ekkara; 39°08′40.4″N 22°11′29.6″E	Central Greece	
11	G3 Bridge (A2)	Γέφυρα Γ3	144 m (472 ft)	326 m (1,070 ft)	Box girder Prestressed concrete Twin bridges 91+144+91	A2 motorway (E90)	2007	Grevena; 40°02′02.1″N 21°24′24.3″E	Western Macedonia	
12	Arachthos Bridge	Γέφυρα Άραχθος	142 m (466 ft)(x6)	1,036 m (3,399 ft)	Box girder Prestressed concrete Twin bridges 92+6x142+92	A2 motorway (E90); Arachthos	2009	Ioannina; 39°42′44.4″N 20°58′57.5″E	Epirus	
13	Katouna Bridge		132 m (433 ft)	289 m (948 ft)	Box girder Prestressed concrete Twin bridges 87+132+70	A2 motorway (E90)	2000	Mavillis; 39°39′13.9″N 20°57′34.2″E	Epirus	
14	G7 Bridge (A2)	Γέφυρα Γ7	120 m (390 ft)	270 m (890 ft)	Box girder Prestressed concrete Twin bridges 75+120+75	A2 motorway (E90)	2004	Malakasi; 39°47′21.3″N 21°15′47.8″E	Thessaly	
15	Venetikos Bridge	Γέφυρα Βενέτικου	120 m (390 ft)(x4)	636 m (2,087 ft)	Box girder Prestressed concrete 2 bridges 80+4x120+76 85+3x120+85	A2 motorway (E90); Venetikos	2008	Grevena; 39°58′47.2″N 21°22′15.2″E	Western Macedonia	
16	Paliouria-Panagia Bridge	Γέφυρα Παλιουριά-Παναγιά	120 m (390 ft)	371 m (1,217 ft)	Box girder Prestressed concrete	Road bridge Haliacmon	2009	Paliouria–Panagia; 39°57′54.6″N 21°43′44.9″E	Western Macedonia	
17	G11 Bridge (A2)	Γέφυρα Γ11	119 m (390 ft)	300 m (980 ft)	Box girder Prestressed concrete Twin bridges 64+119+64; 62+115+62	A2 motorway (E90)		Polymylos; 40°22′46.6″N 22°05′40.3″E	Western Macedonia	
18	G10 Bridge (A2)	Γέφυρα Γ10	112 m (367 ft)	265 m (869 ft)	Box girder Prestressed concrete Twin bridges 61+112+61	A2 motorway (E90)		Kastania; 40°22′56.1″N 22°06′45.6″E	Central Macedonia	
19	Corinth Canal Footbridge		110 m (360 ft)		Arch; Steel through arch	Footbridge; Corinth Canal	1998	Corinth; 37°56′12.8″N 22°58′50.8″E	Peloponnese	
20	Corinth Canal Highway Bridge		110 m (360 ft)	190 m (620 ft)	Box girder Prestressed concrete Twin bridges 32+110+32	A8 motorway (E94); Corinth Canal	1997	Isthmia; 37°55′29.7″N 22°59′51.3″E	Peloponnese	
21	Corinth Canal Railway Bridge		110 m (360 ft)	230 m (750 ft)	Box girder Prestressed concrete 60+110+60	Athens Airport–Patras railway Corinth Canal	2005	Isthmia; 37°55′31.0″N 22°59′49.4″E	Peloponnese	
22	Landslide Bridge		110 m (360 ft)	272 m (892 ft)	Arch; Steel tied arch	New Ikonio Port Railway	2008	Aspropyrgos; 38°01′50.7″N 23°37′50.4″E	Attica	
23	Kastania (G12) Bridge	Γέφυρα Γ12 (Καστανιά Κοζάνης)	107 m (351 ft)(x3)	457 m (1,499 ft)	Box girder Prestressed concrete Twin bridges 61+3x107+75	A2 motorway (E90)		Polymylos; 40°22′14.6″N 22°04′49.7″E	Western Macedonia	
24	G2 Bridge (A2)	Γέφυρα Γ2	104 m (341 ft)(x3)	426 m (1,398 ft)	Box girder Prestressed concrete Twin bridges 57+3x104+57	A2 motorway (E90)		Theodoros Ziakas; 40°00′57″N 21°23′01.7″E	Western Macedonia	
25	Greveniotikos Bridge	Γέφυρα Γρεβενών	100 m (330 ft)(x8)	960 m (3,150 ft)	Box girder Prestressed concrete Twin bridges 60+8x100+60	A2 motorway (E90); Greveniotikos		Grevena; 40°05′35.5″N 21°27′16.8″E	Western Macedonia	
26	Lake Polyfytos Bridge	Γέφυρα της λίμνης του Πολυφύτου	100 m (330 ft)(x2)	1,372 m (4,501 ft)	Box girder Prestressed concrete 71+2x100+71	National Road 3 (E65); Polyfytos Lake	1975	Neraida–Servia; 40°13′57.3″N 21°58′26.2″E	Western Macedonia	

== Notes and references ==
- Notes
- "Odysseus Portal". Odysseus.culture.gr. Ministry of Culture and Sports. Greek monuments database
- Nicolas Janberg. "International Database for Civil and Structural Engineering". Structurae.com.
- Others references

== See also ==
- List of Roman bridges
- List of aqueducts in the Roman Empire
- Transport in Greece
- National Roads and Motorways in Greece
- Rail transport in Greece
- Geography of Greece
