= Papastathis Bridge =

Bridge in Epirus, Greece

Papastathis Bridge Γεφύρι του Παπαστάθη
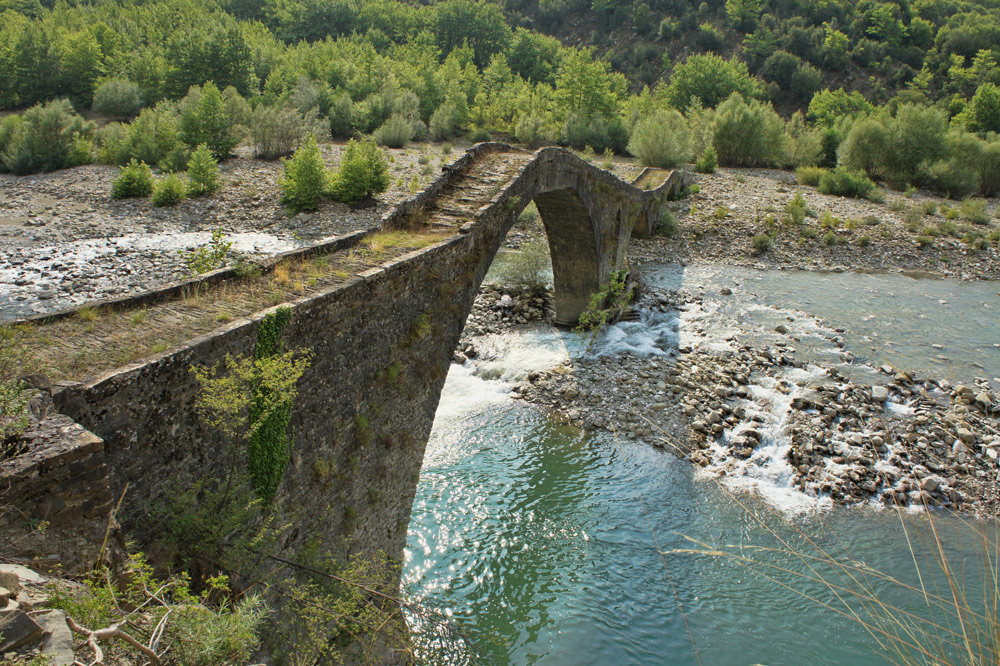
- Bridge Papastathis
- Coordinates: 39°36′59.7″N 21°01′27.7″E
- Carries: Pedestrian (footbridge)
- Crosses: Arachthos River
- Locale: Ioannina, Greece
- Owner: Hellenic Ministry of Culture and Sports

Characteristics
- Material: Stone
- Width: 27 metres (89 ft)
- Height: 870 m (2,854 ft 4 in)
- No. of spans: 1
- Piers in water: 2

History
- Construction end: 1746; 279 years ago

The Papastathis Bridge (Greek: Γέφυρα του Παπαστάθη) is a four-arched bridge in Greece that is located between Driscos and Anatolike and crosses the Arachthos river, in the region of Epirus, near the town of Ioannina.

== Description ==
The bridge was built in 1746 by the Abbot of Viliza Monastery, Agapios, who spent 175 Venetian florins on it. In order for the project to be completed, however, twice as many were needed, which were painstakingly collected by the villagers of the surrounding villages. The need to build the bridge was great because the Arachthos drowned 3 to 4 people every year in that passage. In 1942, the Germans bombed the great arch of the bridge during anti-partisan operations, but the bridge was left standing. Finally, according to local legend when the Arachthos overflows at night one can hear the crying voices of a man and a rooster who were built on the foundations of the bridge.

== See also ==
- Bridge of Arta
- Polyanthos Bridge
- Ottoman Greece
- Hamidiye Bridge
