= Polyanthos Bridge =

Bridge in Greece

Polyanthos Bridge Γέφυρα Πολύανθου
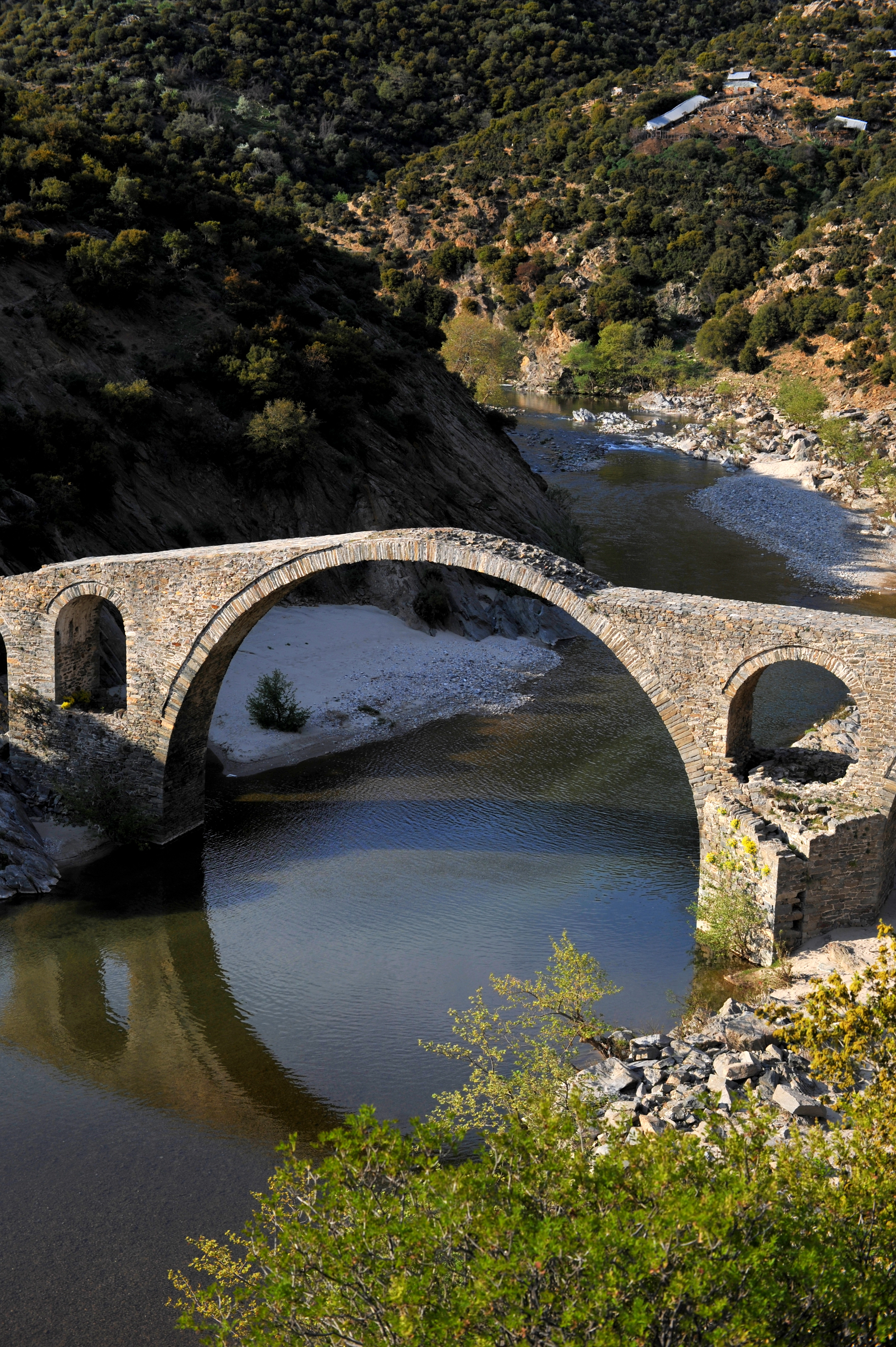
- Polyanthos Bridge
- Coordinates: 41°8′27″N 25°12′40″E
- Carries: Pedestrian (footbridge)
- Crosses: Kompsatos River
- Locale: Rhodope, Greece
- Owner: Hellenic Ministry of Culture and Sports

Characteristics
- Material: Stone
- Height: 12 m (39 ft 4 in)
- No. of spans: 2

The Bridge of Polyanthos (Greek: Γέφυρα Πολύανθου) is an Ottoman bridge (dating to the seventeenth or the eighteenth century) in Western Thrace, in Greece. It crosses the river Kompsatos which is located between the villages of Iasmos and Polyanthos in the prefecture of Rhodope in Western Thrace.

== Description ==
It is a bridge with three arches and has a direction from west to east. The main arch of the bridge has a span of 21.80 meters and a height of 12 meters while the eastern arch has a span of 17 meters. It was built with flat stones by Epirote craftsmen.

In the wider area there are also sites with several early Christian antiquities, such as a three-aisled early Christian basilica located between the village of Polyanthos and the bridge, as well as the Byzantine castle of Polyanthos.

The sign placed near the Polyanthos Bridge characterizes the bridge as a Byzantine / Medieval monument, even though the Greek Ministry of Culture in the book Ottoman Architecture in Greece describes it as belonging to the Ottoman architecture and period. The book A Guide to Ottoman Bulgaria in the chapter Ottoman Bridges comments that within popular folklore in the Balkans, Ottoman bridges in Bulgaria tend to be characterized in popular tradition as Roman, while correspondingly in Greece, Ottoman bridges are described by popular tradition as Byzantine.

== Gallery ==
Polyanthos Bridge

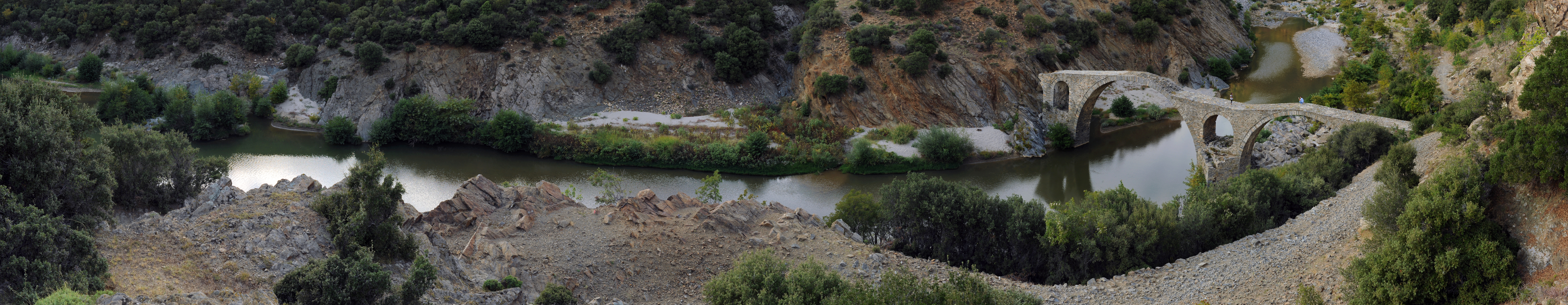
The Kompsatos river and the Bridge of Polyanthos

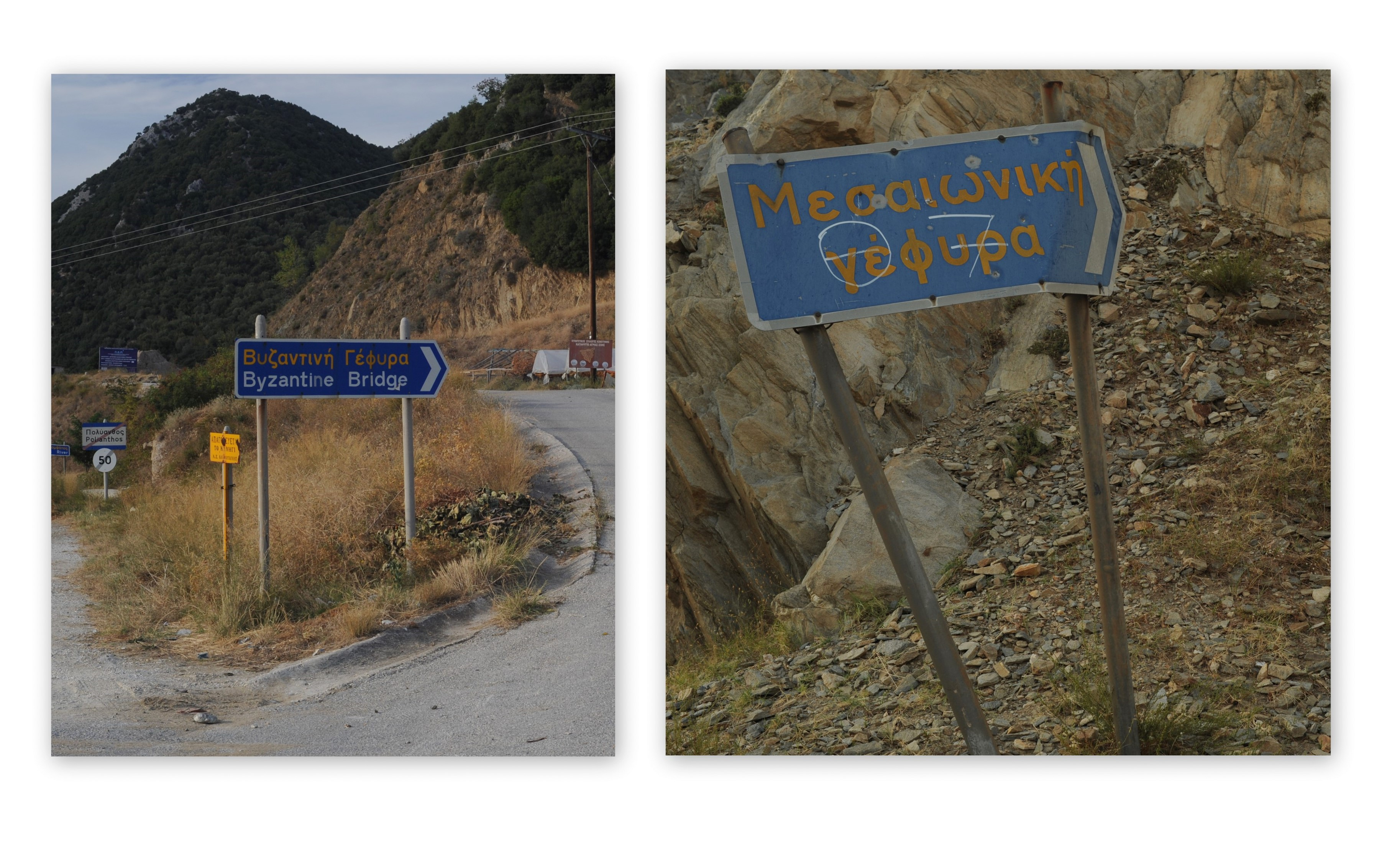
The signs describe the bridge as Byzantine / Medieval.

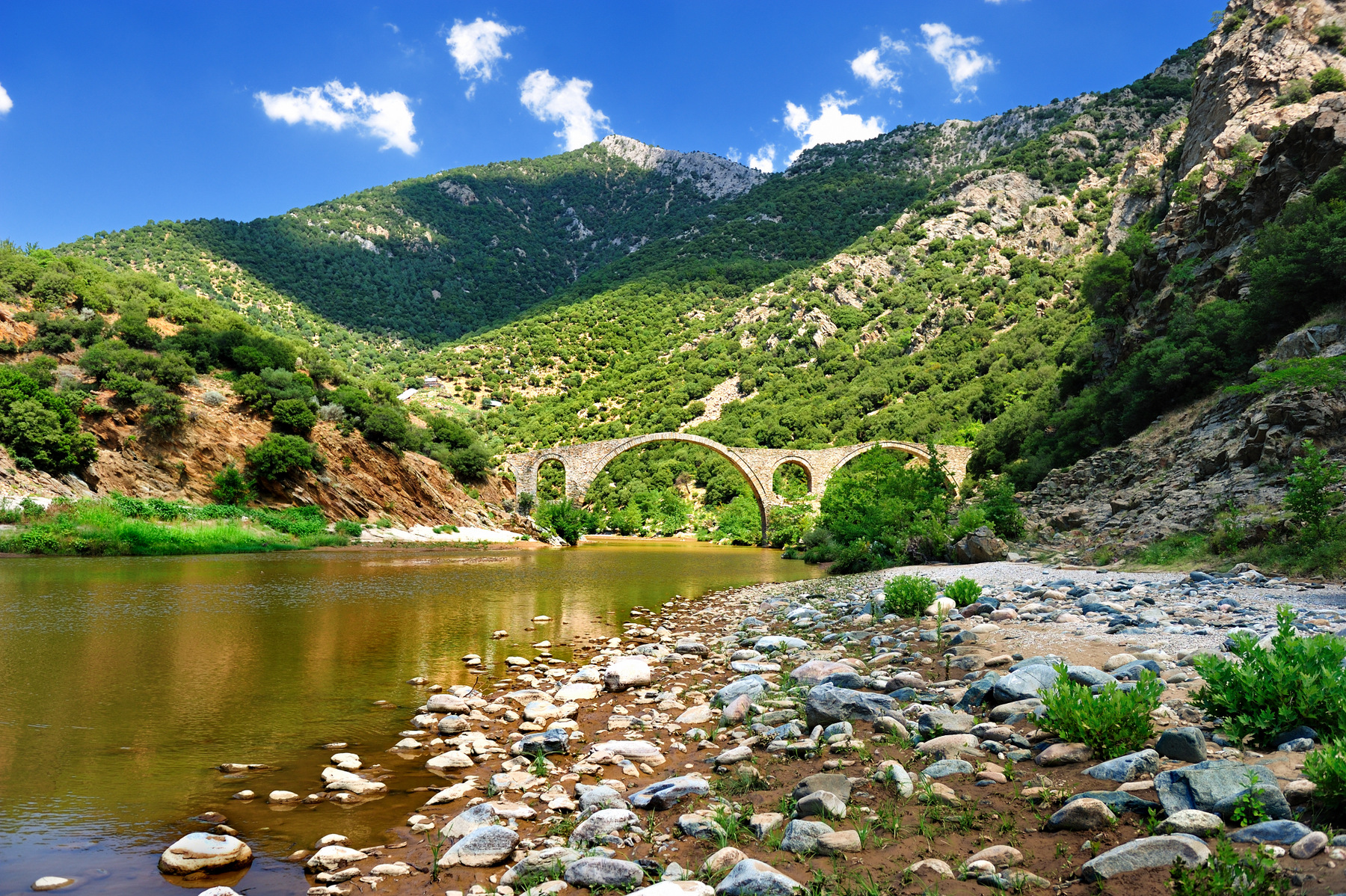
River and bridge.

== See also ==
- Papastathis Bridge
- Bridge of Arta
- Hamidiye Bridge
