= Mystras, Ioannina =

Mystras Μυστράς (Greek) Arburishu (Aromanian)
- Community
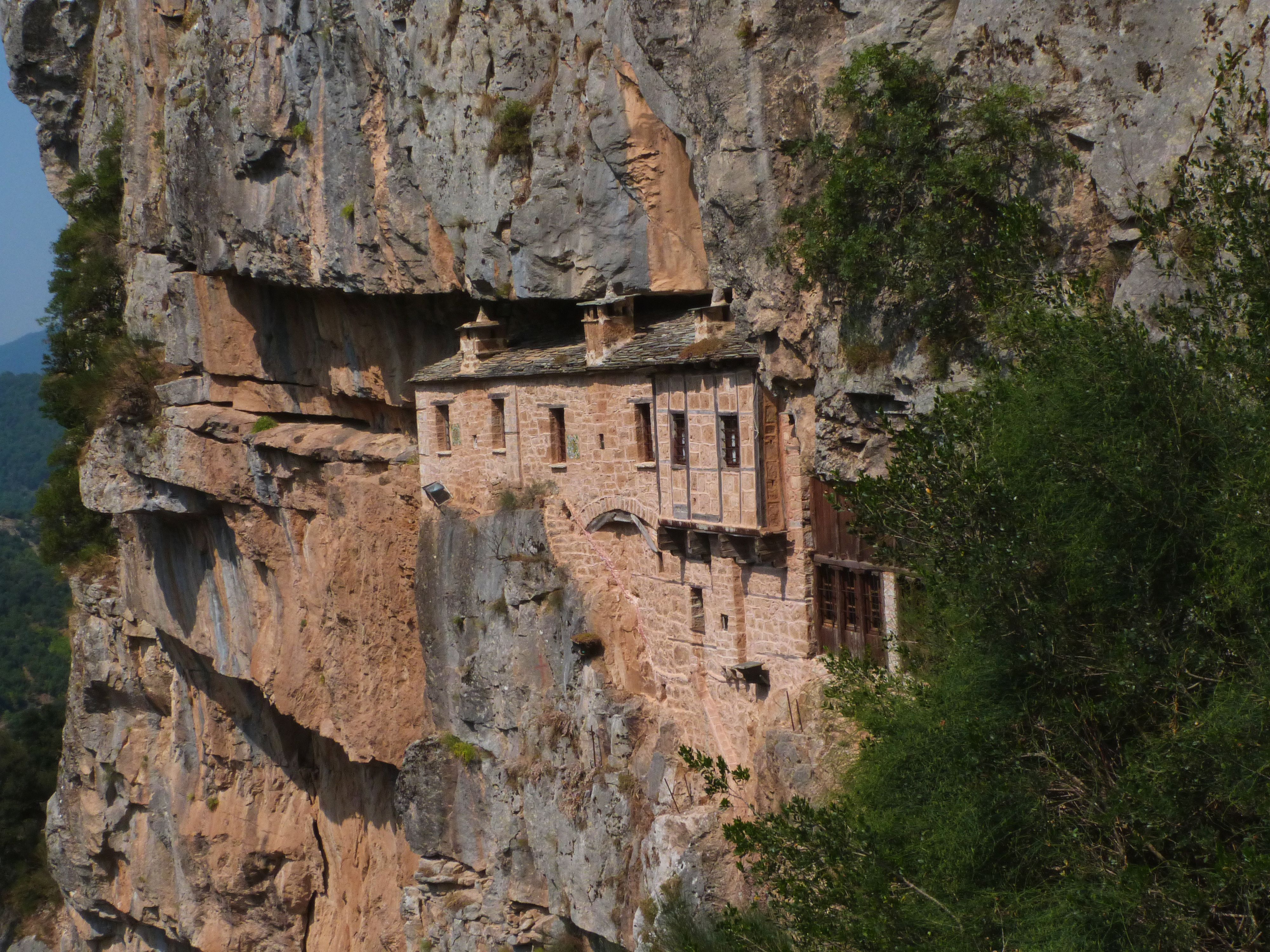
- Monastery of Kipinas

- Location within Greece
- Coordinates: 39°33′57″N 21°6′51″E
- Country: Greece
- Administrative region: Epirus
- Regional unit: Ioannina
- Municipality: North Tzoumerka
- Municipal unit: Kalarrytes
- Elevation: 764 m (2,507 ft)

Population (2021)
  - Community: 43
- Time zone: UTC+2 (EET)
  - Summer (DST): UTC+3 (EEST)

Mystras (Greek: Μυστράς, before 1920: Άρμπορέσι, Arboresi or Άρμπορούσι, Arbourousi; Aromanian: Arburishu), also Kipina (Greek: Κηπίνα) is a settlement in Ioannina regional unit, Epirus, Greece. It is part of the community of Kalarrytes. The village is located on the right bank of the Kalaritikos river, a tributary of the Arachthos river and close to the monastery of Kipina.

== Name ==
The toponym is derived from the earlier form Arboris(i), stemming from the Aromanian nouns arbur and arbure meaning 'tree', from the Latin arbor, combined with the Aromanian suffix -iș. Due to the neighbouring liquid consonant, the original i sound shifted to e and u, resulting in the rendition of the placename with the forms Arboresi and Arborousi.

The village was recorded in Ottoman Turkish cadastres and tax lists as Alboresi mizras in the late 19th and early 20th centuries, with mizras referring to 'land for public use within the boundaries of a kaza (district)'. The form Alboresi stems from Arboresi, where r shifted to l within a consonant cluster. The village was renamed in the early interwar period as Mystras, a form derived from a false etymology of the word mizras. The term mystras is used within several Greek toponyms and is derived from the noun mizithra, 'a type of whey cheese', and the suffix -as. In some dialects of Modern Greek, the words myzithres or tyromyzithres, 'cheese wheels', metaphorically refer to massive white rocks.

Another name of the village is Kipina. The toponym is also used for the nearby monastery and derived from the Slavic kipъ meaning 'icon, painting' and the Slavic suffix -ina.

== Demographics ==
Mystras is an Aromanian village.

== See also ==
- List of settlements in the Ioannina regional unit
