= Ntempriz Bridge =

Frank bridge near Strefi, Messinia, Greece

Ntempriz Bridge Γέφυρα Ντεμπρίζ
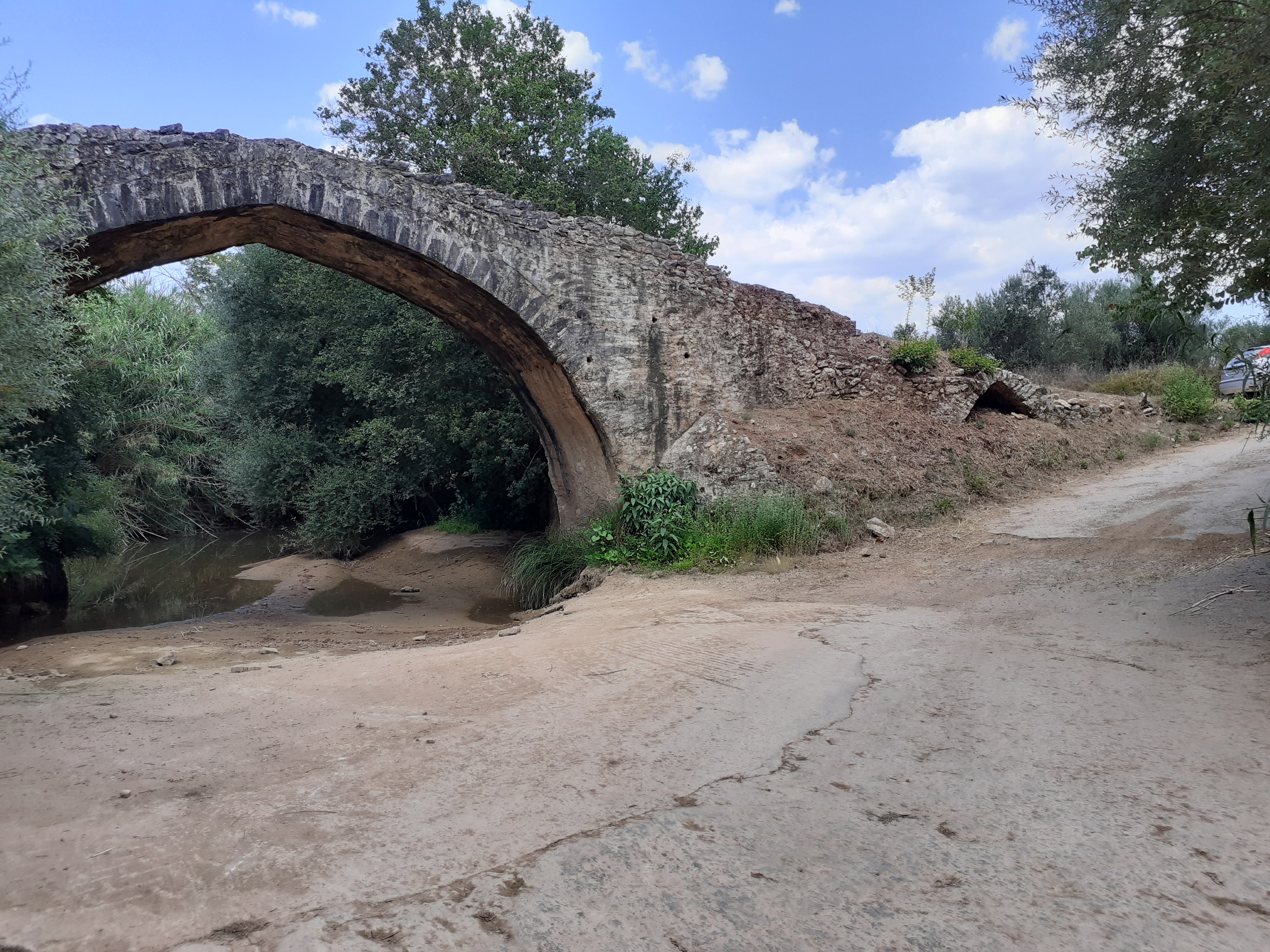
- View to the south
- Coordinates: 37°03′19.3″N 21°52′29.7″E
- Crosses: Velikas river
- Locale: Strefi, Messinia, Greece
- Other name: Greek: Στρεφέικο Γεφύρι

Characteristics
- Design: Arch bridge
- Material: Limestone
- No. of spans: 2

History
- Construction end: Francocracy

Location
- Interactive map of Ntempriz Bridge

The Ntempriz Bridge (Greek: Γέφυρα Ντεμπρίζ), also known as Strefeiko Gefyri (Greek: Στρεφέικο Γεφύρι), is an arch bridge situated in Messinia, approximately 1 km west of Strefi village crossing the canyon where Velikas river runs through. A few hundred meters southeast of the bridge there are the remains of Ntepriz castle which lies on a hill and its residents probably were primary users of the bridge. It was built during the Francocracy period in Greece, to connect Pylos with Messini broader areas.

== Description ==
Made of limestone stones and having just enough width for a carriage, it is arched with two spans, a large main arched span with a slight obtuse angle that accommodates most of the river discharge and a secondary triangular much smaller one on side of the river it crosses. In the past a watermill used to be situated at its exit.

== Date ==
While most sources agree that the bridge was built during Francocracy, there hasn't been conducted enough research for a more precise date to be estimated. Nevertheless, it is considered to be one of oldest bridges in Messinia.

== Gallery ==
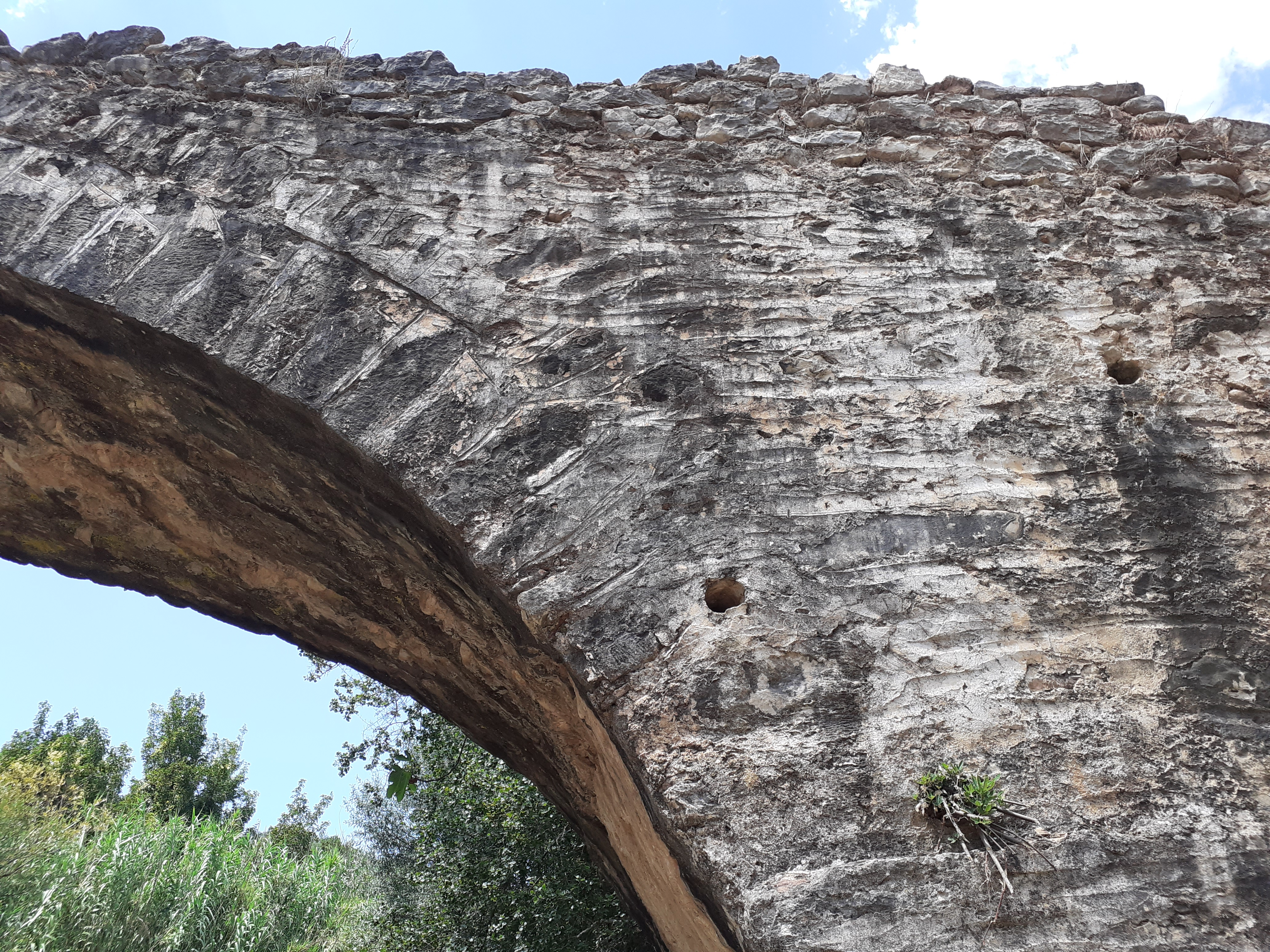
Bridge detail in the big arch where the abutment is visible

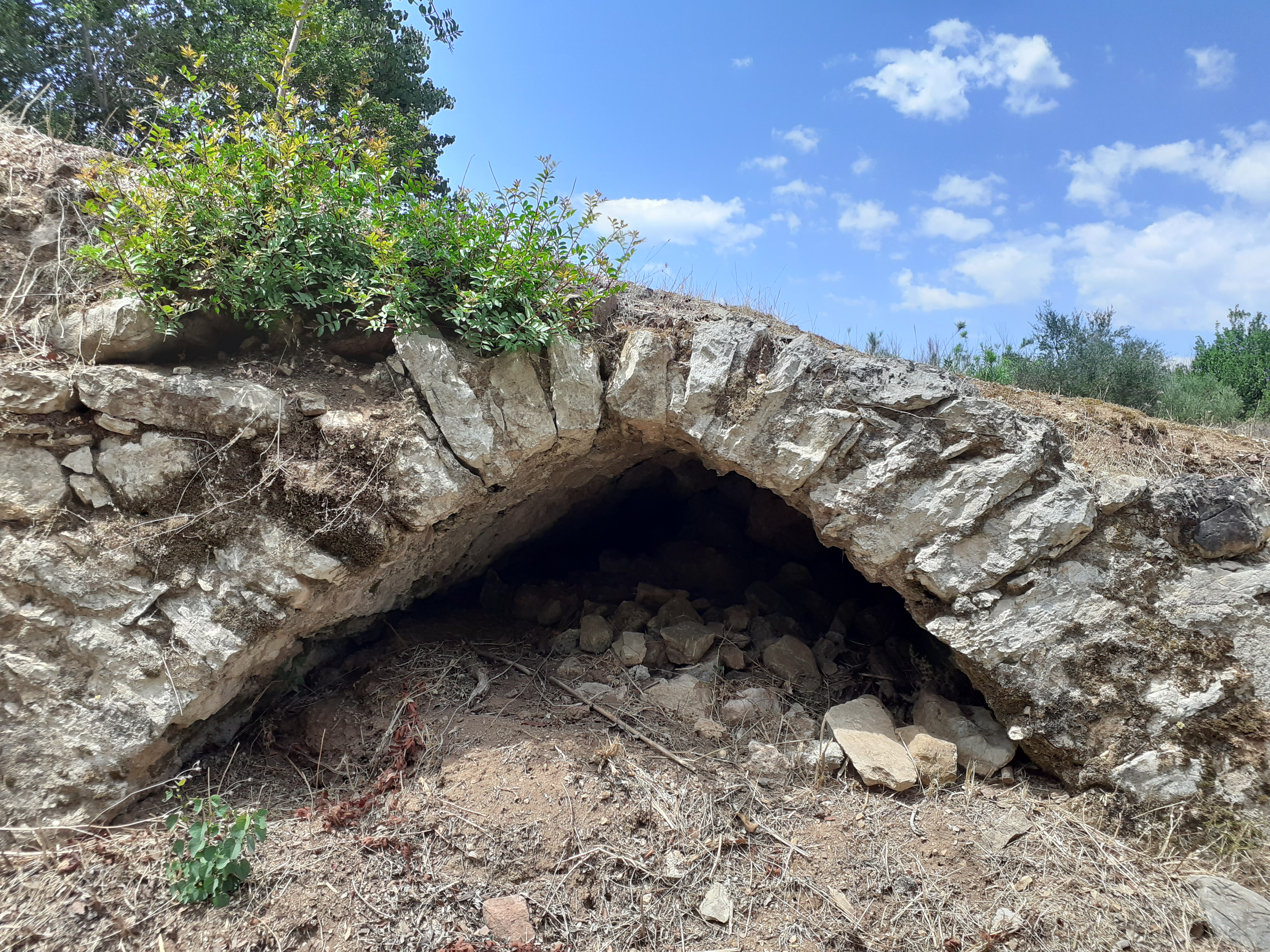
Bridge detail of a small triangular arch

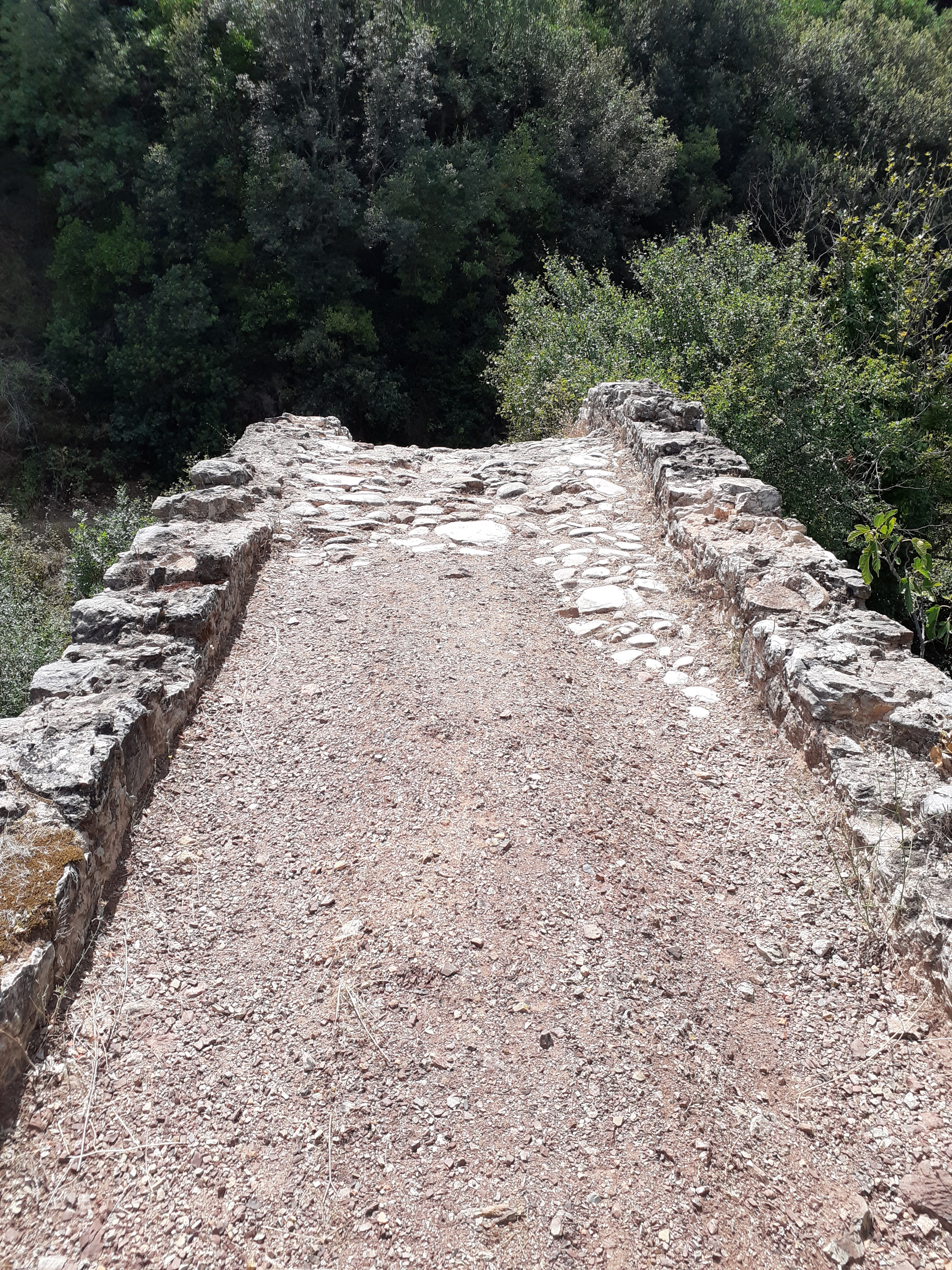
Roadway as seen from top

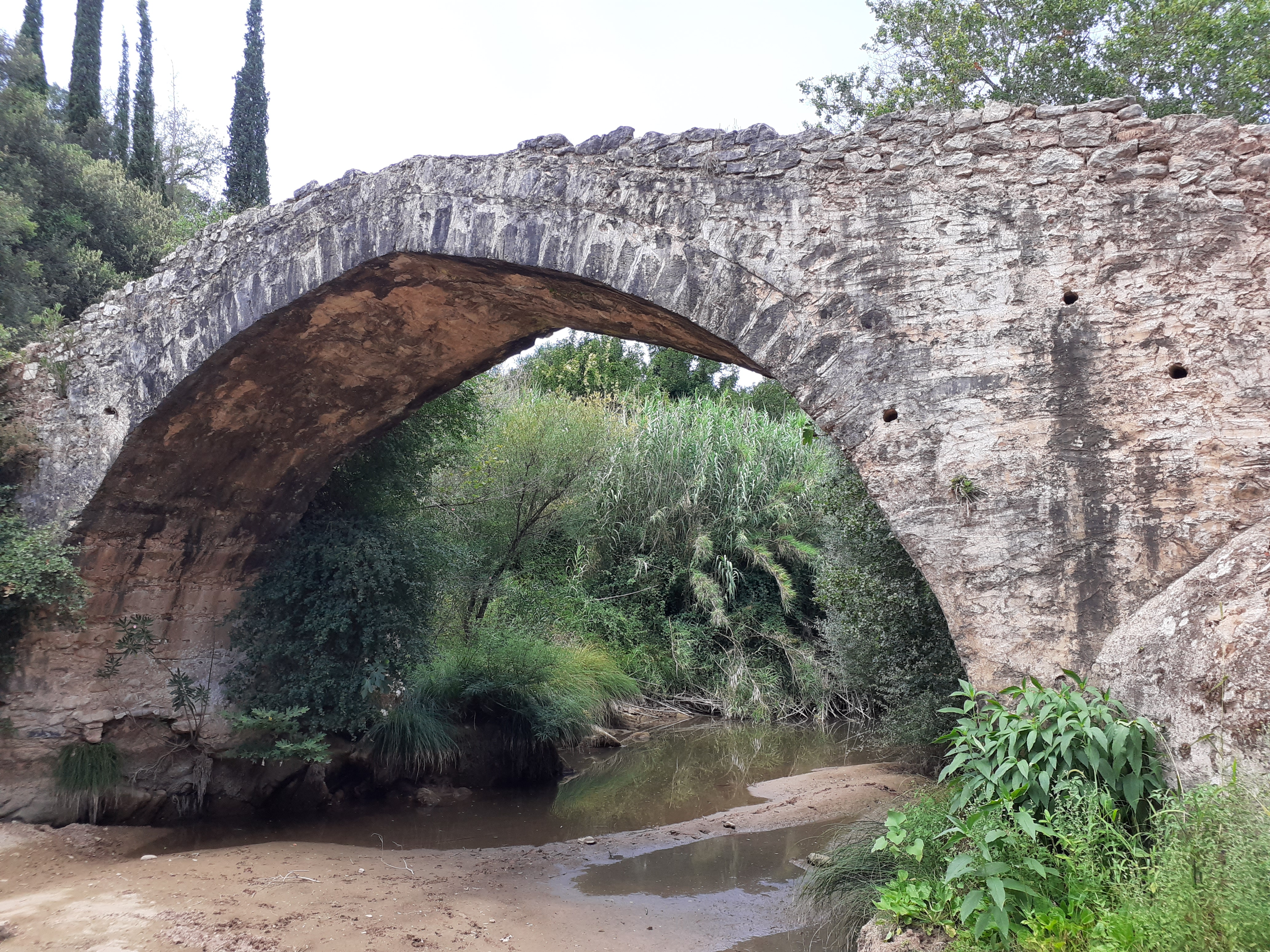
Bridge detail from stream level. This photo was shot during summertime so the river water level was low

== See also ==
- List of bridges in Greece
