= Metsovitikos (river) =

- Native name: Μeτσοβίτικος (Greek)

Location
- Country: Greece

Physical characteristics
- Mouth
  - location: Arachthos
  - coordinates: 39.6817°N 21.0046°E

Basin features
- Progression: Arachthos→ Ionian Sea

The Μetsovitikos (Greek: Μeτσοβίτικος) river is one of the primary tributaries of the Arachthos in Epirus, Greece. The mountainous basin through which it flows is distinguished into two sub-systems. The first one is the zone of the river springs.

== Borders ==
A longitudinal, narrow gorge is formed within a closed circle of mountains. The gorge is defined in the west and north by the peaks of the vast plateau of Politsia, in the east by the peaks of Katara and Zygos and in the south by the mountain Peristeri (or Lakmos).

== Water streams ==
Several streams from the surrounding mountain slopes flow into the basin formed by these mountains. Among them the largest ones are the river of Zygos, the river of Rona and the river of Lessintza (Leʃindzə)[1] or Lentza.

== Confluence of rivers ==
In the location Tria Chania the flow of the Metsovitikos river turns south and enters a second, much wider valley which it crosses along the slope of mountain Peristeri (or Lakmos) down to the area of Baltouma. At this point it merges with the aquatic arm formed by the confluence of rivers Vardas and Zagoritikos which spring in the Eastern and Central Zagori respectively, constituting the second primary bed of the river Arachthos.

== Dipotamos ==
This dual spring of the Arachthos river, known since Antiquity, gave Arachthos its popular name, Dipotamos (Διπόταμος, "two-rivers"). The valley of the Metsovitikos river was the main passage between Epirus, on one hand, and Macedonia and Thessaly, on the other. Today, the A2 motorway (Egnatia Odos) runs through its full length. The settlements located within that area constitute the Municipality of Metsovo.

== Sources ==
- Th. Dasoulas, Agrotikes koinonies tou oreinou chorou kata tin othomaniki periodo: o georgikos kosmos tis “Choras Metzovou” (18os -19os ai.) [Agrarian society in highland areas during the Ottoman period: farmer's population of the land of Metzovo (18th-19th centuries)], publ. EADD (National Archive of PhD Theses, http://hdl.handle.net/10442/hedi/17726), 2009, pp. 121–125, 162-192.
- V. Nitsiakos, Nomos Ioanninon: Synchroni politismiki geographia [Prefecture of Ioannina: Modern Cultural geography], with the cooperation of M. Arapoglou and K. Karanatsi, Prefecture of Ioannina, Ioannina 1998, pp. 417–466.
- K. Thesprotos-A. Psalidas, Geographia Albanias kai Epirou [Geography of Albania and Epiros], published by the Society for Epirote Studies. (EHM), Ioannina 1964, p. 56.
- F. Dasoulas, “Pindos, oi geografikes kai istorikes diastaseis enos onomatos” [Pindos, the geographical and historic dimensions of a name], Epirotiko Imerologio 21 (1912), pp. 13–15.
- H. Holland, Taxidi sti Makedonia kai Thessalia (1812-1813) [Journey in Macedonia and Thessaly], transl. G. Karavitis, publ. Afoi Tolidi, Athina 1989, pp. 39–45.
- Strabo, Geographika [Geography], B. Z (7, 6), publ. Papyros, p. 930.
