= Doukissis Plakentias Bridge =

Bridge in Melissia built by Duchess of Plaisance

Doukissis Plakentias Bridge Γέφυρα Δουκίσσης Πλακεντίας
- View to the south
- Coordinates: 38°02′44.0″N 23°50′05.5″E
- Crosses: Chalandri Stream
- Locale: Melissia, Attica, Greece
- Official name: Greek: Γέφυρα Δουκίσσης Πλακεντίας
- Other name(s): Greek: Πέντε Καμάρες, Μεγάλη Γέφυρα των Λατομείων

Characteristics
- Design: Arch bridge
- Material: Pentelic Marble
- Total length: 40
- Width: 3,3
- Height: 10
- No. of spans: 5
- Load limit: 10 tons

History
- Construction end: 1836

Location
- Interactive map of Doukissis Plakentias Bridge

The Doukissis Plakentias Bridge (Greek: Γέφυρα Δουκίσσης Πλακεντίας) also known as Five Arches (Greek: Πέντε Καμάρες) or Great Bridge of the Quarries (Greek: Μεγάλη Γέφυρα των Λατομείων), is an arch bridge situated in Melissia, Attica, crossing the Chalandri Stream.

== Construction ==
The bridge was built in 1836 based on a carved inscription on the bottom of the bridge and it was funded by the Duchess of Plaisance in order to facilitate the transport of Pentelic Marble extracted from the quarries in Mount Pentelicus. Large quantities of this marble were then required for the construction of the Mansion owned by the Duchess, that currently is used as the Byzantine and Christian Museum, as well as in construction works that had commenced in Athens during the reign of the newly appointed Otto of Greece.

It was designed by the engineer Alexandros Georgantas and it is arguably the oldest bridge in Attica region that can hold motor traffic. While the original 5 spans were clearly visible when the bridge was built, later accumulation of waste building materials, have significantly changed its profile view, as well as its hydraulic function, leading to later additions of concrete at the base of the bridge piers to mitigate soil erosion.

== Description ==
Made of Pentelic Marble, it is arched with five spans and having a width of 3.3m can accommodate the passage of a single direction of vehicles.

== See also ==
- List of bridges in Greece
