= Hamidiye Bridge =

Bridge in Xanthi, Greece

Hamidiye Bridge Γέφυρα Χαμιδιέ
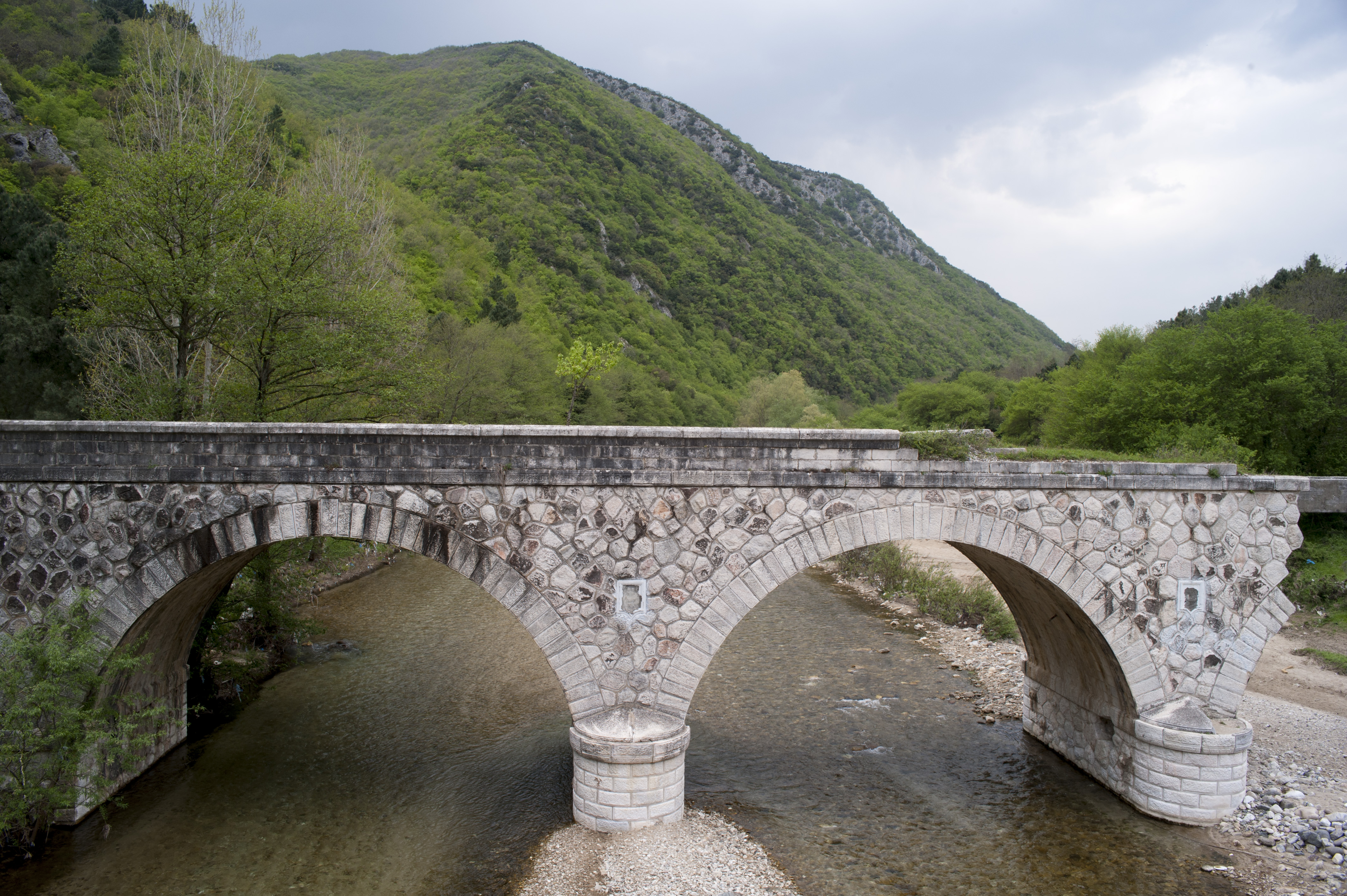
- The Hamidiye Bridge
- Coordinates: 41°9′55″N 24°52′45″E
- Carries: Non-accessible
- Crosses: Kosynthos River
- Locale: Xanthi, Greece
- Owner: Hellenic Ministry of Culture and Sports

Characteristics
- Material: Stone
- Width: 3 metres (9.8 ft)
- Height: 63 m (206 ft 8 in)
- No. of spans: 2
- Piers in water: 3

History
- Construction end: 1904; 121 years ago

The Hamidiye Bridge (Greek: Γέφυρα Χαμιδιέ, Turkish: Hamidiye) is a four-arch Ottoman bridge in Western Thrace, Greece, built in the early twentieth century.

== Description ==
It was built in 1904, during the reign of Sultan Abdul Hamit II, and is located at the fourth kilometer between Xanthi and Stavroupoli. The bridge is 63 m. long and 3 m. wide and crosses over the river Kosynthos. One end of the bridge is demolished; according to one account, the bridge was blown up in 1941 by the Greek army so that invading German troops could not cross. According to the other, the bridge was blown up in 1944 by the leader of nationalist partisans, Tsaous Anton (Antonis Fosteridis), to prevent the passage of the Bulgarian army. In the western part of the bridge there was an Ottoman inscription which has been vandalized.

== See also ==
- Polyanthos Bridge
- Papastathis Bridge
