= Plaka Bridge =

Stone footbridge in Greece

Plaka Bridge Γεφύρι της Πλάκας
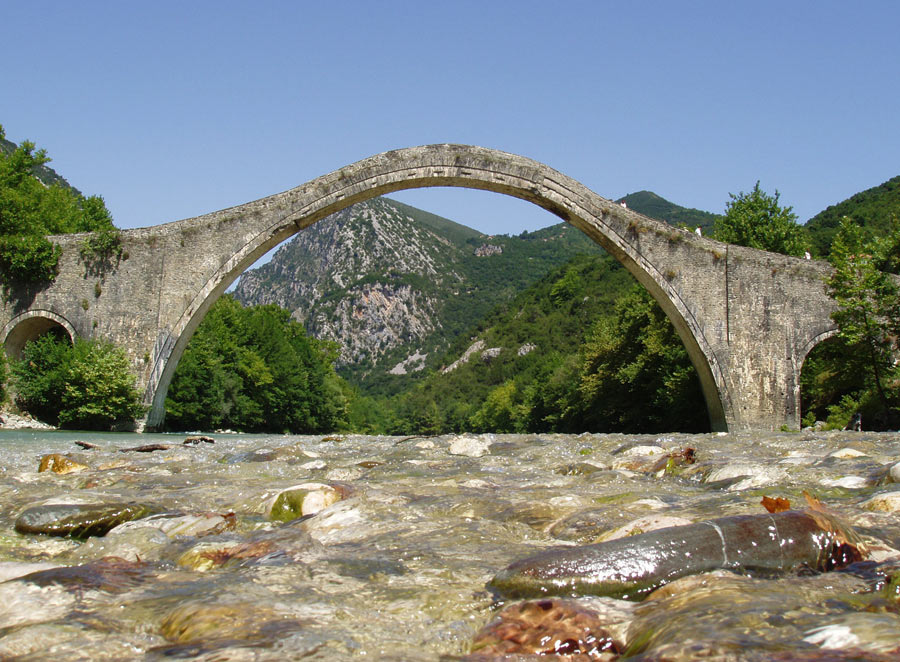
- The bridge in 2011
- Coordinates: 39°27′38″N 21°01′48″E
- Carried: Pedestrian (Footbridge)
- Crossed: Arachthos River
- Locale: Arta and Ioannina, Greece
- Owner: Hellenic Ministry of Culture and Sports

Characteristics
- Material: Stone
- Total length: 61 metres (200 ft) or 75 metres (246 ft)
- Width: 3.20 metres (10.5 ft)
- Height: 21 m (68 ft 11 in)
- No. of spans: 1
- Piers in water: 2

History
- Opened: 1866; 160 years ago
- Collapsed: 1860, 1863, 2015

Location
- Interactive map of Plaka Bridge

Plaka Bridge (Greek: Γεφύρι της Πλάκας, Gefýri tis Plákas) is a 19th-century stone one-arch bridge in Greece. It collapsed multiple times, starting in 1860, later in 1863 and most recently in 2015, it was later rebuilt in 2020 and still stands today.

It is located at the borders of Arta and Ioannina prefectures, above the waters of Arachthos River. Administratively, it belongs to the community of Plaka-Raftaneon. With its arch of 40 metres (130 ft) width and 17.61 m (57 ft 9 in) height, it is the largest one-arch bridge in Greece and the Balkans, and the third largest one-arch stone bridge in Europe. It also had two small auxiliary arches of 6 metres (20 ft) width on its two sides. It was considered "one of the most difficult, single-arch bridges to construct."

The bridge is also the starting point for rafting and canoeing on Arachthos River.

== History ==
=== Construction ===
The bridge was built upon the order of Ottoman Sultan Abdülaziz, and was completed in 1866 under the supervision of the famous local builder Kostas Bekas (Greek: Κώστας Μπέκας) from the nearby village Pramanta. Two previous attempts by other builders in 1860 and 1863 had proven unsuccessful, with the bridge collapsing during construction (in 1863 it collapsed on the very day of its inauguration). The cost of construction, 180,000 kuruş, was covered by the local communities and the rich merchant Ioannis Loulis.

=== In operation ===
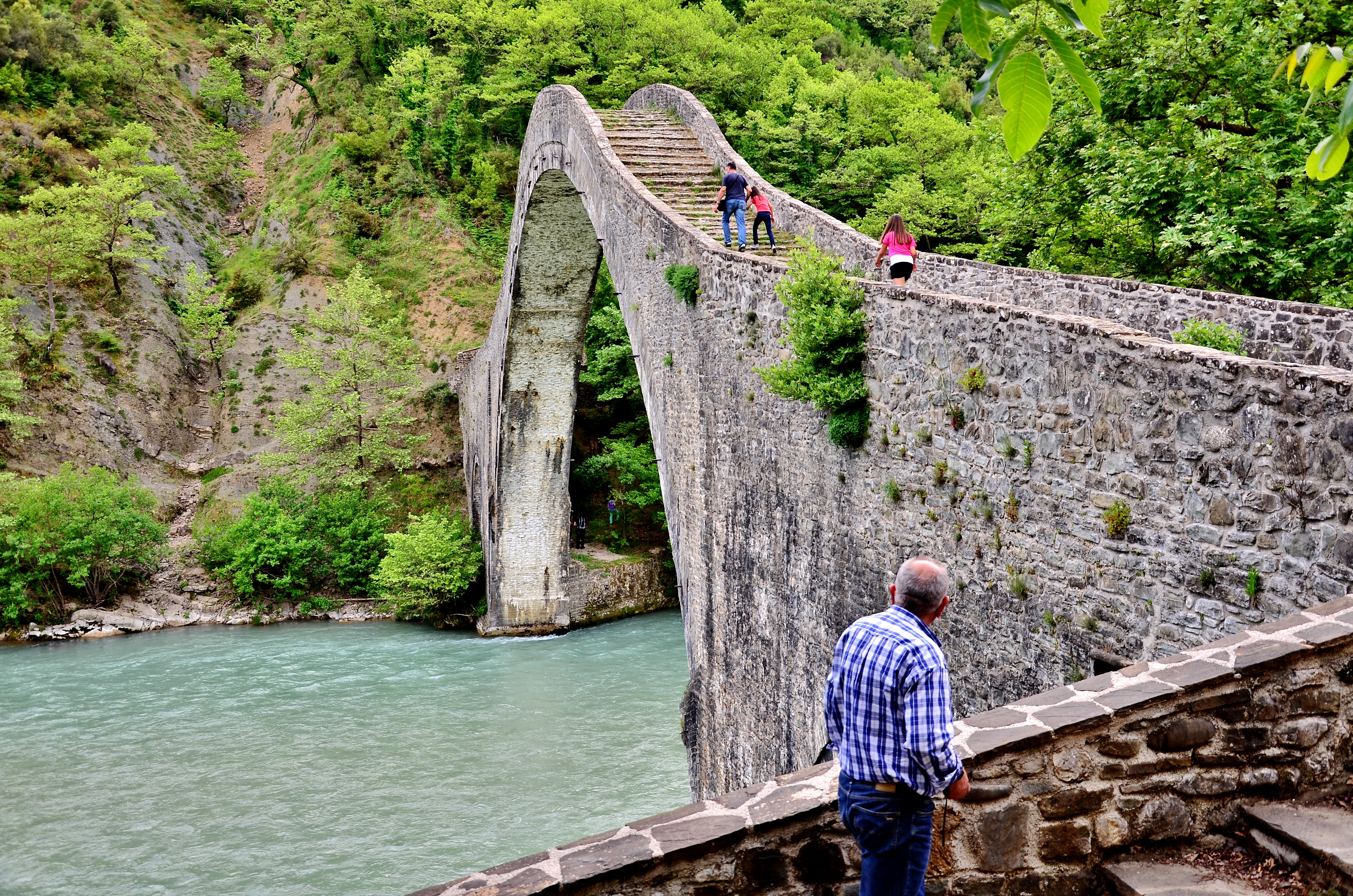
Plaka Bridge being crossed by tourists

On 3 February 1878, during the anti-Ottoman revolt of that year, Greek troops under the command of Konstantinos Kottikas defeated the Turkish garrison of the bridge and made them retreat.

Between 1881 and 1912 (the First Balkan War), the bridge marked the border between the Kingdom of Greece and the Ottoman Empire, and a customs building was erected alongside it, which still survives. Also, near the bridge there was an outpost of the Greek army and an inn. The bridge used to be a trade route, connecting Tzoumerka with Epirus and Thessaly.

During World War II, it was bombed by the Germans, but withstood the bombing with minor damage. Locals repaired it using cement in 1943. On 29 February 1944, during the Axis Occupation of Greece, the Treaty of Plaka was signed near the bridge among the armed groups of the Greek Resistance, EAM, EDES, and EKKA. According to the treaty, resistance groups agreed to refrain from infringing on each other's territory, and all future war efforts would be directed against the Germans. This marked the end of the "first round" of the Greek civil war, which had started on October 12, 1943.

In spite of the two small 6-metre-wide (20 ft) relief arches, the bridge's apex thickness of 1.56 m (5 ft 1 in) has been considered small by experts, causing a concentration of horizontal stresses in a region where a 15-centimetre (5.9 in) crack could be found.

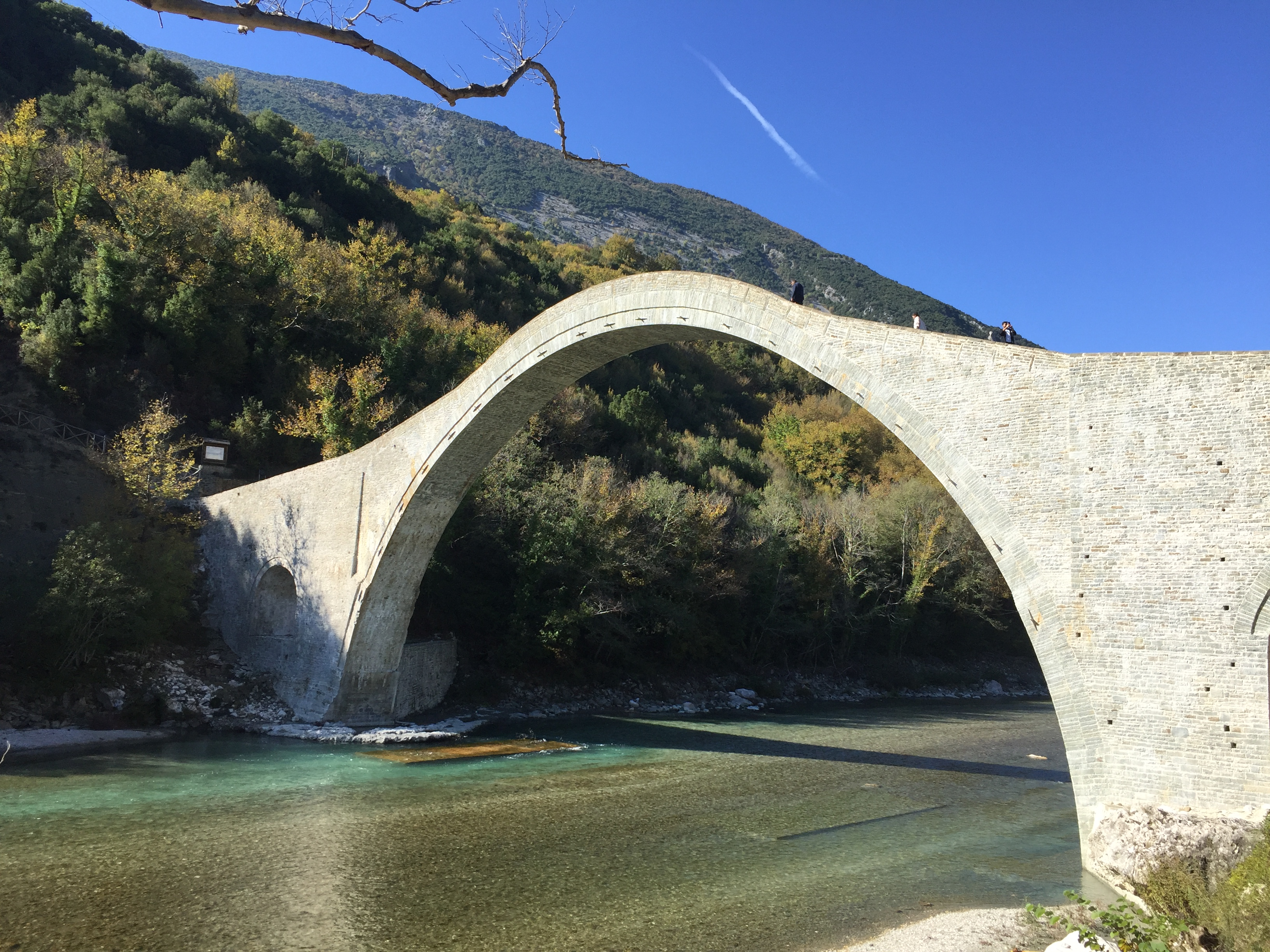
Plaka bridge after the restoration

During heavy rains in 2007, the bridge nearly collapsed, and a restoration was considered but not taken, raising criticism by the public.

=== Collapse (2015) ===
The bridge, which was one of the most impressive examples of Greek popular architecture, collapsed on 1 February 2015. A flash flood caused by heavy rainfall caused the Arachthos River to rip the bridge's foundations from the riverbanks leading the central section of the bridge to collapse and be washed away. The next day, Alternate Minister of Infrastructure Christos Spirtzis and representatives of the Culture Ministry travelled to the region to assess the situation and announced that it was technically feasible to restore the historic bridge. Experts assessed the damage. The materials would be recovered from the river once water levels have fallen.

As of July 2020, restoration work, supported by the National Technical University of Athens, is over, and the rebuilt bridge was completed in the summer of 2020.
