= Melissia =

Melissia Μελίσσια
- Municipal unit
- The Beehives' Land

- Location in the North Athens regional unit

- Location within Greece
- Coordinates: 38°3′N 23°50′E
- Country: Greece
- Administrative region: Attica
- Regional unit: North Athens
- Municipality: Penteli

Area
  - Municipal unit: 3.956 km^{2} (1.527 sq mi)
- Elevation: 290 m (950 ft)

Population (2021)
  - Municipal unit: 23,618
  - Municipal unit density: 5,970/km^{2} (15,460/sq mi)
- Time zone: UTC+2 (EET)
  - Summer (DST): UTC+3 (EEST)
- Postal code: 151 xx
- Area code: 210
- Vehicle registration: Z
- Website: www.melissia.gr

Melissia (Greek: Μελίσσια) is a town and a suburb in the northeastern part of the Athens agglomeration, Greece. Since the 2011 local government reform it is part of the municipality Penteli, of which it is the seat and a municipal unit. The municipal unit has an area of 3.956 km^{2}. Melissia is situated at the southwestern foot of the Penteli mountains, 12 km northeast of Athens city centre. It is a green residential town.

It was part of the municipality of Marousi until 1946, when it became a separate community. It became a municipality in 1990. The population of Melissia was more than 22,000 at the 2011 census. It has six primary schools, two high schools (Greek "Gymnasium"), one lyceum and a modern municipal swimming-pool.

== History ==
In ancient times Melissia was a rural area that belonged to the administrative boundaries of the ancient municipality of Athmonum. The areas of the region were used for cultivation, livestock breeding, but also by beekeepers. During the Turkish occupation it served as a hideout with its caves at the foot of the Pendelikos for the inhabitants of Marousi.

According to one view, it took its name from the village of Melissia in Akontion of Boeotia during the years of Frankish rule.

After 1920, the first rudimentary residences began to be built, mainly cottages for the visitors of the Holy Monastery, while after the Asia Minor Catastrophe of 1922, the mass settlement of Melissia began, on land granted to Asia Minor families by the Holy Monastery. In order to preserve the Asia Minor Memory, a well-known street was given the name of the first settlers of Melissia, the square next to the Church of St. George is called ‘Square of Asia Minor’, the Association of Asia Minor Melissia ‘Agios Georgios Gioul Baxe’ operates. The Asia Minor refugees who lived in the area, who came from Gioulbaxe in Asia Minor (a village of Vourla in the wider region of Smyrna) and built the Church of St. George in memory of the homonymous church that was located in Gioulbaxe in Asia Minor. At the same time, the first hospitals-sanatoriums were built for those who suffered from tuberculosis at that time and chose the area as a place of residence and convalescence because of its good climate.

Over the years, the population is beginning to grow, while the inhabitants work in various institutions or engage in petty trade. Thus we reach 1990, when, with the settlement pressure around Athens, Melissia is finally recognized as a municipality.

This changed again in 2010, when with the Kallikratis Programme, the city of Melissia was set to be absorbed by the municipality of Penteli.

== Historical population ==
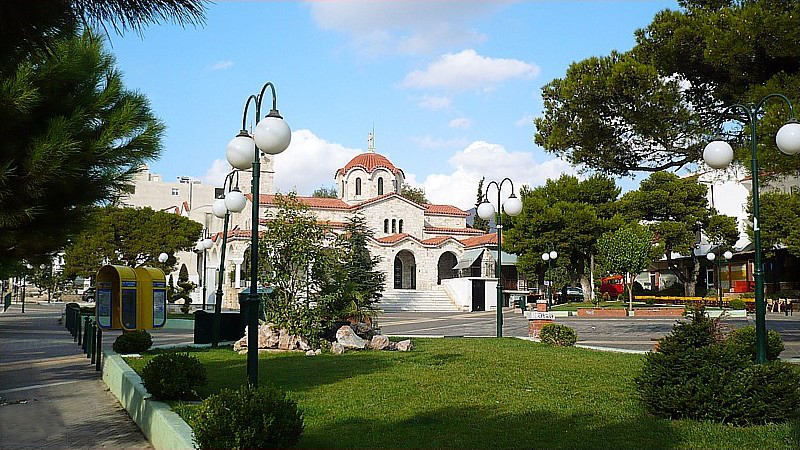
Melissia Main Square

Melissia began to be massively inhabited mainly in the early 1980s and at the end of the 1990s their residential saturation began. The table below shows the population development of Melissia, based on historical data from 1928 and official censuses by decade.

Year	Population
1981	8,639
1991	13,469
2001	19,526
2011	22,741
2021	23,618

== Gallery ==
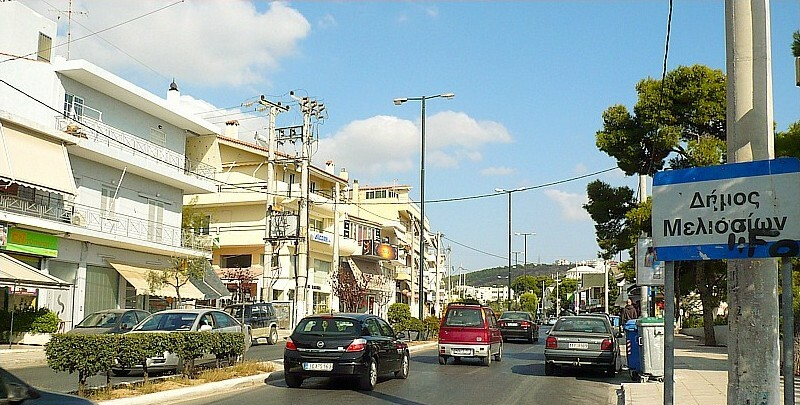
Dimokratias Avenue

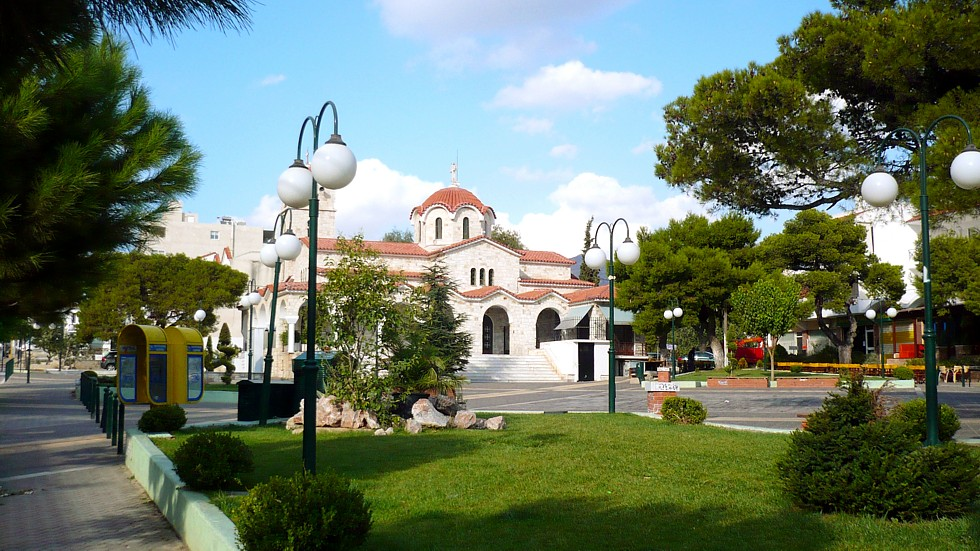
Agios Georgios Square

Heavy snowfall

Doukissis Plakentias Bridge

== See also ==
- List of municipalities of Attica
