= Rhodes Footbridge =

Bridge in the city of Rhodes, Greece

- Coordinates: 36°26′29″N 28°13′57″E
- Crosses: Culvert without name
- Locale: Rhodes, Greece

Characteristics
- Design: Arch bridge (Earliest known Greek true arch bridge)
- Material: Poros stone
- Total length: 2.8 m
- Width: Ca. 8 m
- Longest span: 2.8 m
- No. of spans: 1

History
- Construction end: 4th century BC

The Rhodes Footbridge is an ancient Greek arch bridge in the city of Rhodes, Greece. Dating to the 4th century BC or early Hellenistic period, the modest structure represents the oldest known Greek bridge with a voussoir arch.

== Construction and location ==
The Rhodes Footbridge was unearthed in 1966−67 close to the eastern harbour of the city of Rhodes, the Akandia Bay. There, an artificial channel of 2.15 m depth ran parallel to the ancient city walls, separated by an 11 m wide street running in between. The sidewalls of the conduit were made of at least four layers of poros stone blocks, the same material also employed for the arch.

Nearly at its midpoint, the canal is crossed by an 8 m broad arch of wedge-shaped stones which served as a footbridge. The curved opening has a single span of 2.8 m, identical to the width of the canal. Its surprisingly low rise, in the order of 1 to 3−4, gives it the appearance of a segmental or even multi-centered arch, of which it is the only known example in Greek architecture.

While it has been argued that the footbridge remained the only vault bridge in the Greek world, there is—debatable—evidence of at least three more Greek true arch bridges of pre-Roman date.

== See also ==
- List of Roman bridges

== Sources ==
- Boyd, Thomas D. (1978), "The Arch and the Vault in Greek Architecture", American Journal of Archaeology, 82 (1): 83–100 (91), doi:10.2307/503797, JSTOR 503797
- Briegleb, Jochen (1971), "Die vorrömischen Steinbrücken des Altertums", Technikgeschichte, 38 (3): 255–260
- Galliazzo, Vittorio (1995), I ponti romani, vol. 1, Treviso: Edizioni Canova, pp. 36, 39f, ISBN 88-85066-66-6
