= Kompsatos =

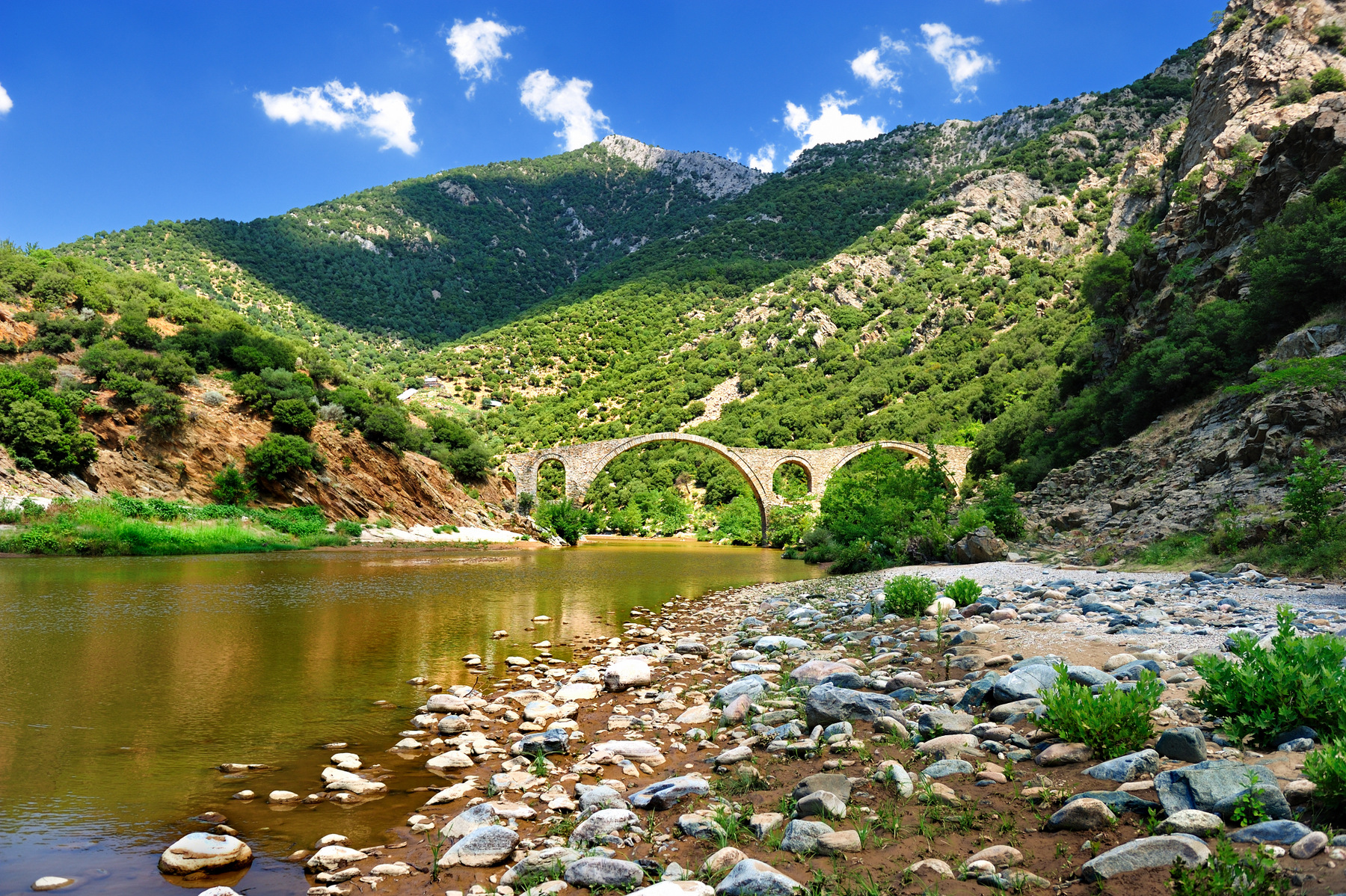
- The river with the Polyanthos Bridge
- Native name: Κομψάτος (Greek)

Location
- Country: Greece
- Region: Western Thrace

Physical characteristics
- Source
  - location: Rhodope Mountains
  - coordinates: 41°20′53″N 24°59′5″E
- Mouth
  - location: Lake Vistonida
  - coordinates: 41°3′31″N 25°7′9″E
- Length: 68 km (42 mi)
- Basin size: 596 km^{2} (230 sq mi)

The Kompsatos (Greek: Κομψάτος, Bulgarian: Сушица, Sushitsa), also called the Kouroú (Κουρο, Kurú) is a river flowing in Western Thrace, Greece. The river is 68 kilometers long and has a drainage basin of 596 km^{2} (230 sq mi). It originates from the Rhodope Mountains and flows into Lake Vistonida.
