= Arachthos (river) =

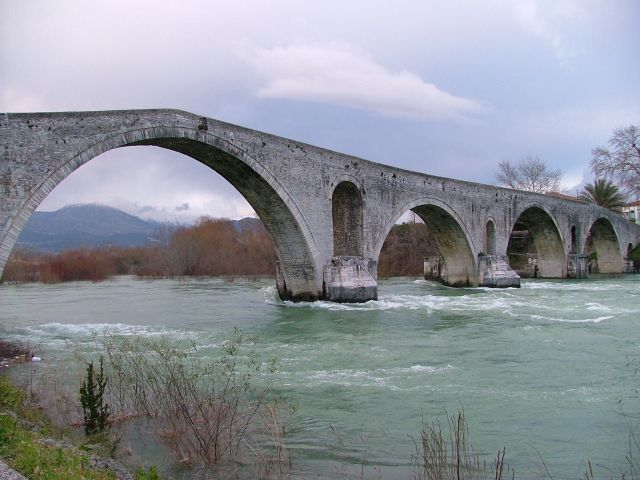
- The Arachthos in Arta

Location
- Country: Greece

Physical characteristics
- Source
  - location: Pindus mountains
- Mouth
  - location: Ionian Sea
  - coordinates: 39°0′45″N 21°4′19″E
- Length: 110 km (68 mi)
- Basin size: 2,209 km^{2} (853 sq mi)

The Arachthos (Greek: Άραχθος) is a river in the eastern Epirus region of Greece. Its source is in the Pindus mountains, near the town Metsovo (Ioannina regional unit). The Arachthos is 110 km (68 mi) long and its drainage area is 2,209 km^{2} (853 sq mi). Its upper course is known as Metsovitikos. From its confluence with the Dipotamos near the village of Batza it is called Arachthos. It flows towards the south, passing between the Athamanika and the Xerovouni mountains. Here it reaches the Plaka Bridge, the largest one-arch stone bridge in Greece. It enters the large Pournari Reservoir, in the Arta regional unit, which is about 18 km^{2} and prevents flooding of the city of Arta and also supplies water to most of Epirus. The town of Peta is situated near the dam. Arta, about 8 km downstream of the dam, is the largest town on the river. Arta's historic landmark is the stone Bridge of Arta over the Arachthos. The river continues through the lowlands south of Arta, and finally empties into the Ambracian Gulf near Kommeno, 16 km southeast of Arta.
