= Bridge of Arta =

Arta Bridge Γεφύρι της Άρτας
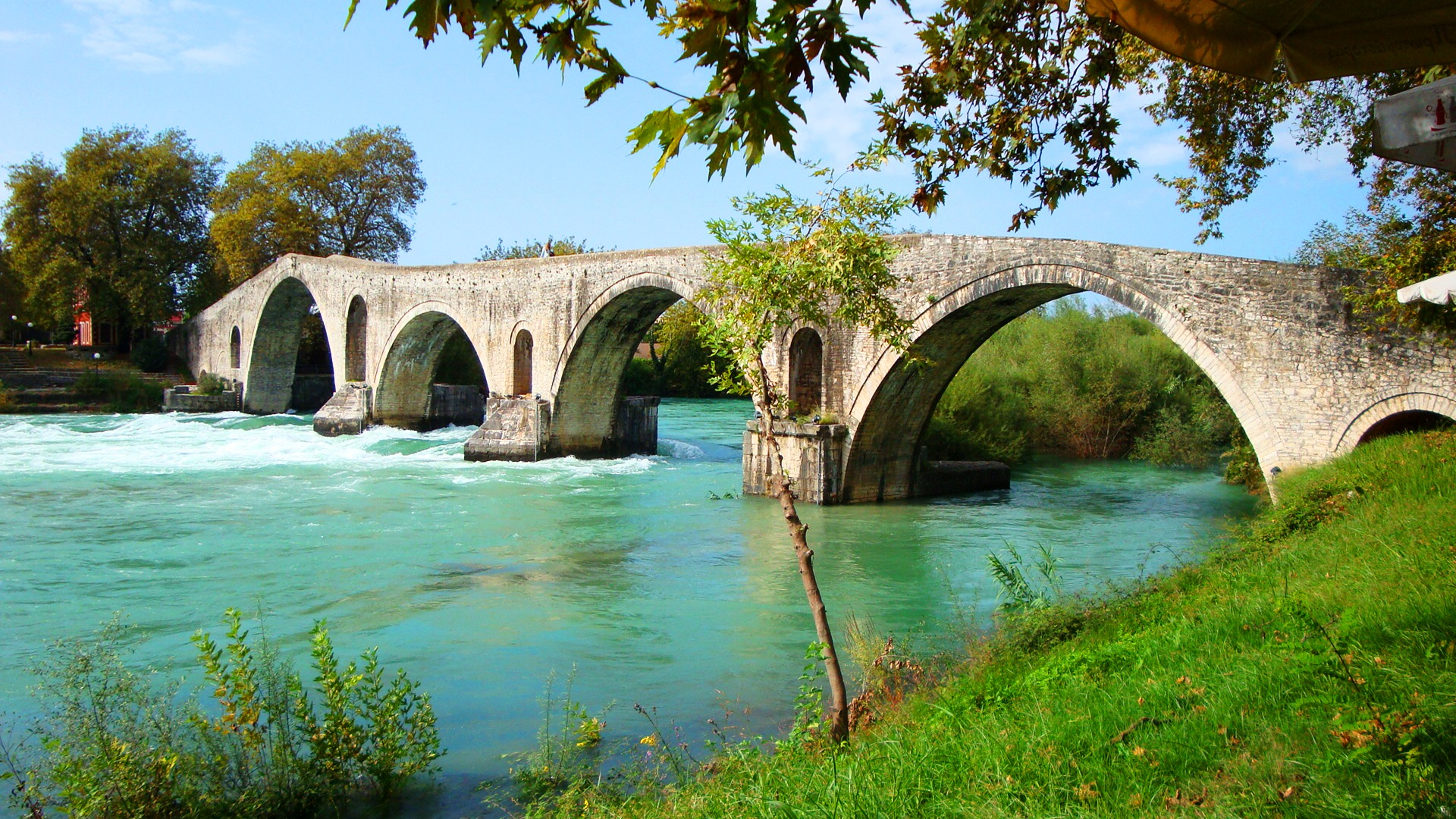
- Arta Bridge
- Coordinates: 39°09′06″N 20°58′29″E
- Carries: Pedestrian (footbridge)
- Crosses: Arachthos River
- Locale: Arta, Greece
- Owner: Hellenic Ministry of Culture and Sports

Characteristics
- Material: Stone
- Width: 4 metres (13 ft)
- Height: 12 m (39 ft 4 in)
- No. of spans: 4
- Piers in water: 5

History
- Construction end: 1612; 414 years ago

Location
- Interactive map of Arta Bridge

The Bridge of Arta (Greek: Γεφύρι της Άρτας) is a stone bridge that crosses the Arachthos river (Άραχθος) in the west of the city of Arta (Άρτα) in northwestern Greece. It has been rebuilt many times over the centuries, starting with Roman or perhaps older foundations; the current bridge is probably a 17th-century Ottoman construction.

The folk ballad "The Bridge of Arta" tells a story of human sacrifice during its building. From the ballad, a number of Greek proverbs and customary expressions arose, associated with interminable delays, as in the text of the ballad: "All day they were building it, and in the night it would collapse."

== History ==
According to the Epirote chronicler Panayiotis Aravantinos, the bridge was first built under the Roman Empire. Some traditions say it was rebuilt when Arta became capital of the Despotate of Epirus, possibly under Michael II Doukas (r. 1230–1268). The current bridge is Ottoman, probably from 1602–06 or perhaps 1613. From the annexation of Arta in 1881 to the outbreak of the First Balkan War in 1912, the highest point of the bridge was the border between the Ottoman Empire and the Kingdom of Greece.

== Folklore ==
According to the folk ballad of the acritic songs family, 45 masons and 60 apprentices, under the leadership of the Head Builder, were building a bridge, but its foundations would collapse each night. Finally a bird with a human voice informed the Head Builder that, in order for the bridge to remain standing, he should sacrifice his wife. As she is being buried alive in the foundations of the construction, she curses the bridge to flutter like a leaf, and those who pass it to fall like leaves also. She is then reminded that her brother is abroad and might pass the bridge himself, so she changes her curses so as to become actual blessings: "As the tall mountains tremble, so shall the bridge tremble, and as the birds of prey fall, so shall passers fall".

=== Parallels ===
Immurement was a common motive in the folklore of Balkan peoples. For example, the Serbian epic poem The Building of Skadar and the Romanian folk poem The Argeș Monastery embody the theme.

One of the legends associated with Merlin is that Vortigern, the King of the Celts, was building a tower to defend himself from Ambrosius and Uther Pendragon. Like the Bridge of Arta, whenever they finished one day's work on the tower it would collapse in the night and Vortigern's advisors recommended that sacrificing a child and mixing his blood with the mortar would prevent the collapse.

== See also ==
- Ottoman Greece
- Papastathis Bridge

== Sources ==
- Artemis Leontis, "The Bridge between the Classical and the Balkan", The South Atlantic Quarterly 98:4:625-631 (1999) at MUSE On understanding the place of the Bridge of Arta in the literary landscape.
