= Egnatia, Ioannina =

Egnatia Εγνατία
- Municipal unit
- Location within the regional unit

- Location within Greece
- Coordinates: 39°44′N 21°04′E
- Country: Greece
- Administrative region: Epirus
- Regional unit: Ioannina
- Municipality: Metsovo

Area
  - Municipal unit: 131.424 km^{2} (50.743 sq mi)
- Elevation: 819 m (2,687 ft)

Population (2021)
  - Municipal unit: 1,867
  - Municipal unit density: 14.21/km^{2} (36.79/sq mi)
- Time zone: UTC+2 (EET)
  - Summer (DST): UTC+3 (EEST)
- Vehicle registration: ΙΝ

Egnatia (Greek: Εγνατία) is a former municipality in the Ioannina regional unit, Epirus, in northwestern Greece. Since the 2011 local government reform, it is part of the Metsovo municipality, of which it is a municipal unit. The municipal unit has an area of 131.424 km^{2}. In 2021 its population was 1,867. The seat of the municipality was in Mikro Peristeri. The main roads in the municipal unit are the A2 motorway (Egnatia Odos) and the EO6 national road.

== Subdivisions ==
The municipal unit Egnatia is subdivided into the following communities (constituent villages in brackets):

- Chrysovitsa (Chrysovitsa, Ampelia, Analipsi, Myloi, Xiriko, Siolades)
- Megali Gotista (Megali Gotista, Baltouma)
- Mega Peristeri (Mega Peristeri, Ampelakia, Karyofyto, Kastri, Kerasia, Milies)
- Mikra Gotista (Mikra Gotista, Agios Minas, Batza, Riza, Sioutsos)
- Mikro Peristeri (Mikro Peristeri, Giarakari, Neo Gerakari, Palaiochori, Prosilia, Rachoula, Tampouria)
- Sitsaina
