= List of Aromanian settlements =

Aromanian settlements can be found across the southern Balkan peninsula. They are populated solely by or a large proportion of Aromanians. Below is a list of the settlements that were either founded by Aromanians or are inhabited by a large number or strong Aromanian populations.

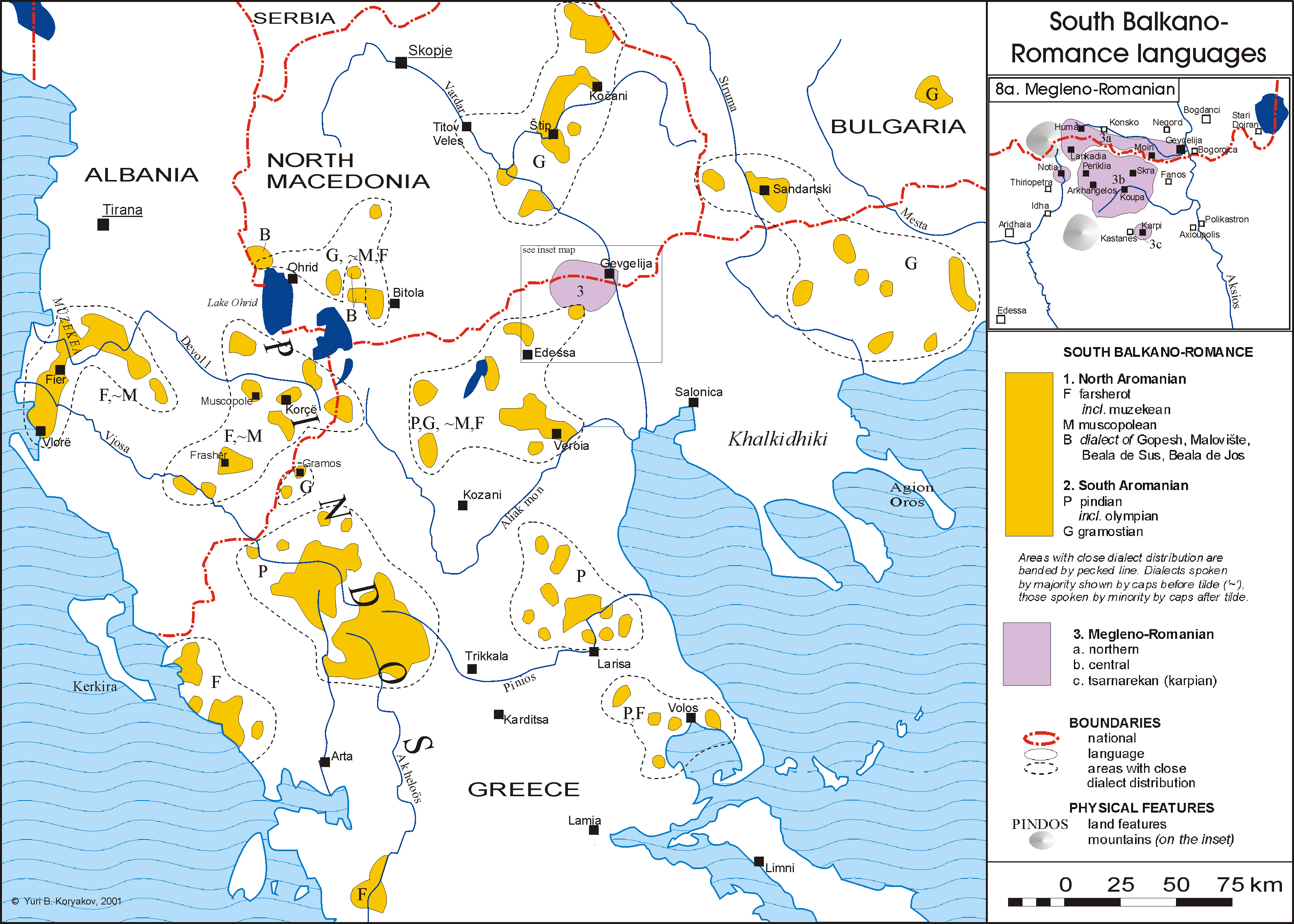
Distribution and dialects of the Aromanian language in the southwestern Balkans

== List of settlements ==
=== Muzachia region ===
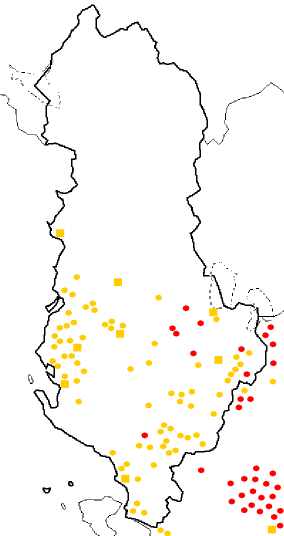
Aromanians are the exclusive population in the settlement Aromanians form a majority or a substantial minority in the settlement

The Muzachia region (Aromanian: Muzachia, Albanian: Myzeqe) is an area in western Albania which encompasses parts of the Fier, Tirana and Durrës counties. It has a large Aromanian population spread across many villages. The Aromanian inhabitants of Muzachia are referred to as Muzachiars or Muzachirenji in Aromanian.

Tirana (in the latest Albanian census, Tirana had the highest number of Aromanians in Albania, although Aromanians form a negligible percentage of the population)
(Albania) Kavajë
(Albania) Divjakë
(Albania) Elbasan
(Albania) Fier (Aromanian: Ferãcã/Ferãche/Ferecã, Ferãca/Fereca)
(Albania) Patos
(Albania) Kosovë
(Albania) Ardenicë
(Albania) Portëz
(Albania) Perlat
(Albania) Beshisht
(Albania) Cerkovinë
(Albania) Çipllak
(Albania) Grabian
(Albania) Grabova e Sipërme (Aromanian: Greãva, Grabuva)
(Albania) Gradishtë (Aromanian: Gradishta)
(Albania) Jubë (Aromanian: Juba)
(Albania) Kalasë
(Albania) Koshova (Aromanian: Coshova)
(Albania) Kryegjatë
(Albania) Libofshë
(Albania) Moravë (Aromanian: Murava)
(Albania) Përparim
(Albania) Pobrat (Aromanian: Pubrat, Pubrata)
(Albania) Poshnjë
(Albania) Shtyllas
(Albania) Skrofotinë (Aromanian: Scrufutina)
(Albania) Stan-Karbunarë
(Albania) Xhyrinë
(Albania) Zhepë

=== Epirus region ===
The Epirus region encompasses northwestern Greece and southern Albania.

(Albania) Berat (Aromanian: Birat, Birati / Bãrat, Bãrata)
(Albania) Vlorë (Aromanian: Amvlona)
(Albania) Selenicë (Aromanian: Selenitsa, Selenitsã/Selenitse)
(Albania) Kotë
(Albania) Gjirokastër (Aromanian: Ljurocastru)
(Albania) Andon Poçi (Aromanian: Tavan, Tavana)
(Albania) Humelicë (Aromanian: Umelitsa, Umelitse)
(Albania) Palokastër (Aromanian: Palucastra)
(Albania) Hundëkuq
(Albania) Labovë
(Albania) Karjan (Aromanian: Carian, Cariana)
(Albania) Kakoz (Aromanian: Cacoz, Cacoza)
(Albania) Gjat (Aromanian: Ghiat, Ghiata)
(Albania) Erind (Aromanian: Rin, Rina)
(Albania) Nokovë (Aromanian: Nucova, Nãcova)
(Albania) Mingul
(Albania) Këllëz (Aromanian: Cãlez, Cãleza)
(Albania) Dhoksat (Aromanian: Dhucsat, Dhucsata)
(Albania) Qestorat (Aromanian: Chiãsturat, Chiãsturata)
(Albania) Valare (Aromanian: Valarei, Valarea)
(Albania) Stegopul (Aromanian: Stãgopul)
(Albania) Suhë (Aromanian: Sua)
(Albania) Saraqinisht
(Albania) Selckë
(Albania) Leusë
(Albania) Sqepur (Aromanian: Schiepur, Schiepura)
(Albania) Poliçan (Aromanian: Pulician)
(Albania) Skore (Aromanian: Scurei, Scurea)
(Albania) Zagoria (Aromanian: Zaguria, Zagurii)
(Albania) Topovë (Aromanian: Tupova, Tãpova)
(Albania) Ndëran
(Albania) Xarrë (Aromanian: Dzara)
(Albania) Shkallë
(Albania) Delvinë (Aromanian: Delvãn, Delvãna)
(Albania) Kardhikaq
(Albania) Bajkaj
(Albania) Stjar
(Greece) Igoumenitsa (Aromanian: Yuminitse, Yuminitsa)
(Greece) Paramythia (Aromanian: Pãrmãthia, Pãrmãthii)
(Greece) Filiates
(Greece) Arta
(Albania) Përmet (Aromanian: Pãrmeti)
(Albania) Frashër (Aromanian: Frashar)
(Albania) Leshicë
(Albania) Badëlonjë
(Albania) Biovizhdë
(Albania) Çarshovë (Aromanian: Ciarshova)
(Albania) Draçovë
(Albania) Hoshevë
(Albania) Kosinë (Aromanian: Cusina)
(Albania) Kutal
(Albania) Vllaho-Psillotarë
(Albania) Gërmenj
(Greece) Ioannina (Aromanian: Ianina, Enina or Enãna)
(Greece) Delvinaki
(Greece) Kefalovryso (Aromanian: Migidei, Migidea)
(Greece) Vovousa (Aromanian: Baiesa, Baiasa)
(Greece) Smenos
(Greece) Asproklisi

==== Pindus ====
One of the largest population of Aromanians in the Balkans is concentrated in the Pindus Mountains. These people are referred to as Pindians or Pindenji in Aromanian. The Aromanians have traditionally formed a majority population in this area. These populations were the subjects of two failed, Italian-sponsored attempts at creating an autonomous Aromanian statelet in the area, with the Principality of Pindus in World War I and the so-called "Roman Legion" in World War II.

(Greece) Agia Paraskevi
(Greece) Amarantos
(Greece) Ampelochori
(Greece) Anilio (Aromanian: Nkiare, Chiarã)
(Greece) Anthousa
(Greece) Armata
(Greece) Avdella (Aromanian: Avdhela)
(Greece) Chrysomilea
(Greece) Dessi
(Greece) Distrato (Aromanian: Briaza)
(Greece) Doliani
(Greece) Elatochori
(Greece) Elefthero
(Greece) Flampourari
(Greece) Fourka (Aromanian: Furka)
(Greece) Fteri
(Greece) Gardiki
(Greece) Glykomilea
(Greece) Grevena (Aromanian: Grebini)
(Greece) Greveniti (Aromanian: Grebinishi)
(Greece) Haliki
(Greece) Iliochori (Aromanian: Dobrinovo)
(Greece) Kalarites
(Greece) Tzoumerkon
(Greece) Kaminia
(Greece) Kastaniani
(Greece) Kastania
(Greece) Katafyto
(Greece) Kipourio
(Greece) Klino
(Greece) Konitsa (Aromanian: Cunitsa)
(Greece) Korydallos
(Greece) Kranea (Aromanian: Turia)
(Greece) Laista (Aromanian: Laka)
(Greece) Makrino
(Greece) Malakasi
(Greece) Matsouki
(Greece) Megali Kerasia
(Greece) Metsovo (Aromanian: Aminciu)
(Greece) Milea (Aromanian: Ameru)
(Greece) Mouria
(Greece) Nea Zoi (Aromanian: Burshan)
(Greece) Orthovouni
(Greece) Palaioselli
(Greece) Panagia
(Greece) Parakalamos
(Greece) Pefki
(Greece) Perivoli (Aromanian: Pirivoli)
(Greece) Pertouli
(Greece) Pirra
(Greece) Samarina (Aromanian: Samarina, Xamarina, San Marina)
(Greece) Skamneli
(Greece) Smixi (Aromanian: Zmixi)
(Greece) Syrrako (Aromanian: Siracu)
(Greece) Tsepelovo
(Greece) Tristeno
(Greece) Trygona
(Greece) Vasiliko
(Greece) Vissani
(Greece) Votonossi
(Greece) Votnossi
(Greece) Vovousa (Aromanian: Baieasa)
(Greece) Vrysochori (Aromanian: Leshnitsa)
(Greece) Trikomo

==== Gramos ====
The Gramos Mountains (Aromanian: Gramostea, Gramustea, Greek: Γράμος, Albanian: Gramoz) in the northern part of the Epirus region of the Balkan peninsula. Many Aromanian settlements are concentrated in this area which is shared by both Greece and Albania. Gramustians or Yrãmushcianji as they are referred to by Aromanians, make up a large proportion of the population there.

(Greece) Aetomilitsa (Aromanian: Densko, Denicko)
(Greece) Argos Orestiko (Aromanian: Hrupistea)
(Greece) Dendrohori
(Greece) Fousia (Aromanian: Fusa)
(Greece) Gramos (Aromanian: Gramosta)
(Greece) Ieropigi
(Greece) Kleisoura (Aromanian: Klisura, Vlahokleisura)
(Greece) Linotopion (Aromanian: Linatopia, Lintopia, Linotopea, Linutopia)
(Greece) Milohorion
(Albania) Llëngë (Aromanian: Lunca)
(Albania) Grabovë e Sipërme (Aromanian: Greãva, Grabuva)
(Albania) Niçë (Aromanian: Nicea, Niceani)
(Albania) Shipskë (Aromanian: Shipca)
(Albania) Nikolicë (Aromanian: Niculitsã, Niculitsa)
(Albania) Dardhë
(Albania) Arrëz
(Greece) Veterniko
(Greece) Vlasti (Aromanian: Blatsa)

=== Macedonia region ===
A large proportion of Aromanians can be found in the region of Macedonia, which is shared by Albania, Greece, North Macedonia, and Bulgaria (region of Pirin Macedonia).

The city of Moscopole (Albanian: Voskopojë, Voskopoja) was once home to the largest Aromanian population in the world. It was the cultural and commercial center of the Aromanians with a population of over 60,000 people. The city was razed to the ground by Ali Pasha in 1788 causing an exodus of Aromanian people across the Balkans. Many of these ended up in what would become North Macedonia, Albania and Greece. The largest concentration of these were in the Pelister region of North Macedonia, the city of Kruševo and around the Prespa Lakes. The Moscopolitans of the Moscopoleanji as they are known in Aromanian form one of the largest populations of Aromanians today. They speak the Grabovean/Moscopolean dialect of Aromanian and the descendants of the Graboveans/Moscopoleans in Krusevo (Aromanian: Crushuva, Macedonian: Крушево) are today a fully recognised minority group under the constitutional law of North Macedonia.

(Albania) Moscopole (Aromanian: Moscopole)
(Albania) Korçë (Aromanian: Curceaua, Curceauã, Curceau or Curciau)
(Albania) Floq
(Albania) Vithkuq (Aromanian: Bitcuchi)
(Albania) Drenovë (Aromanian: Ndãrnova)
(Albania) Maliq
(Albania) Dishnicë
(Albania) Plasë (Aromanian: Pleasa, Pliasa, Pljasa)
(Albania) Boboshticë (Aromanian: Bubushtitsã, Bubushtitsa)
(Albania) Kamenice (Aromanian: Caminitsã, Caminitsa)
(North Macedonia) Kruševo (Aromanian: Crushuva)
(North Macedonia) Bitola (Aromanian: Bituli, Bitule)
(Greece) Agios Germanos
(North Macedonia) Arilevo
(North Macedonia) Dolna Belica (Aromanian: Beala di Ghios, Beala di Cămpu)
(Greece) Drosopigi (Aromanian: Belkamen)

(Greece) Marmaras

(Greece) Flampouro
(North Macedonia) Gopeš (Aromanian: Gopish, Gopeshi)
(North Macedonia) Gorna Belica (Aromanian: Beala di Suprã, Beala di Supra)
(North Macedonia) Jankovec
(Greece) Kallithea
(North Macedonia) Kruševo (Aromanian: Crushuva)
(Greece) Krystallopigi (Aromanian: Belkamen)
(North Macedonia) Magarevo (Aromanian: Magaruva, Magarova, Mãgãreva)
(North Macedonia) Malovište (Aromanian: Mulovishti, Malovishtea, Molovishci)
(Greece) Medovon
(Greece) Milohorion
(Greece) Moschochori
(Greece) Lechovo
(North Macedonia) Nižepole (Aromanian: Nijopale)
(Greece) Nymfaio (Aromanian: Nevesca)
(North Macedonia) Ohrid (Aromanian: Ohãrda)
(Greece) Patima (Aromanian: Paticina)
(Greece) Pili
(North Macedonia) Resen
(North Macedonia) Trnovo (Aromanian: Tãrnuva, Tãrnova)
(Greece) Vlasti (Aromanian: Blatsa)
(Greece) Pipilista (Aromanian: Namata)
(Greece) Vrontero
(Greece) Thessaloniki (Aromanian: Sãruna, Sãrunã)
(Greece) Kozani (Aromanian: Cojani)
(Greece) Kavala
(Greece) Ano Poroia (Aromanian: Foroi)
(Bulgaria) Arzach
(Bulgaria) Bratsigovo
(Bulgaria) Bozhdovo
(North Macedonia) Štip (Aromanian: Shtip)
(North Macedonia) Kočani (Aromanian: Coceani, Cociani)
(North Macedonia) Čatal
(Bulgaria) Dorkovo
(North Macedonia) Emirica
(North Macedonia) Gevgelia
(Greece) Irakleia (Aromanian: Giumala de Jos)
(North Macedonia) Kalini Kamen
(Bulgaria) Karamandra
(North Macedonia) Vrbica (Aromanian: Vãrbitsa)
(North Macedonia) Kratovo (Aromanian: Cratova)
(North Macedonia) Kumanovo (Aromanian: Kumanova)
(North Macedonia) Lisec
(North Macedonia) Lopen
(Bulgaria) Lopovo
(North Macedonia) Lozovo
(North Macedonia) Ovcepole
(Bulgaria) Pazardzhik
(Bulgaria) Popovi livadi (Aromanian: Papas Chair)
(Bulgaria) Peshtera
(North Macedonia) Ponikva, Osogovo (Kočani Municipality)
(North Macedonia) Radovistea
(Bulgaria) Shatravo
(Bulgaria) Sofia
(Bulgaria) Strumski Chiflik
(North Macedonia) Sveti Nikole (Aromanian: San Nikole)
(North Macedonia) Tito Veles
(Bulgaria) Tsepina
(North Macedonia) Vroica

==== Mount Vermion ====
(Greece) Agios Pavlos
(Greece) Ano Grammatiko (Aromanian: Grãmãticuva)
(Greece) Ano Vermio (Aromanian: Selia de Sus)
(Greece) Kato Vermio (Aromanian: Selia de Jos)
(Greece) Kedrona (Aromanian: Cãndruva)
(Greece) Naousa (Aromanian: Niagushti)
(Greece) Polla Nera
(Greece) Seli (Aromanian: Selia)
(Greece) Stenimachos (Aromanian: Isashcovedo)
(Greece) Veria (Aromanian: Veryia)
(Greece) Megala Livadia (Aromanian: Livadzi, Calive)
(Greece) Xirolivado (Aromanian: Xiralivadi)

=== Thessaly-Mount Olympus area ===
This region is home to the most southerly population of Aromanians in the Balkans, with a prominent presence during the late Middle Ages. The Farsherots or the Fãrshãrots as they are known in Aromanian make a substantial percentage of the region's inhabitants.

(Greece) Larissa regional unit
(Greece) Farsala
(Greece) Trikala (Aromanian: Trikolj)
(Greece) Kalabaka
(Greece) Volos (Aromanian: Volu)
(Greece) Almyros (Aromanian: Armiro)
(Greece) Anthotopos (Aromanian: Kililaiu)
(Greece) Makrychori
(Greece) Mikri Perivoli (Aromanian: Taktalasman)
(Greece) Neriada (Aromanian: Kerminli)
(Greece) Parapotamos
(Greece) Sesklo (Aromanian: Sheshklu)
(Greece) Tyrnavos
(Greece) Velestinon (Aromanian: Velescir)
(Greece) Vlachogiano
(Greece) Kalochori Larisa (Aromanian: Toivasi, Orta)

==== Mount Olympus ====
(Greece) Argyropouli (Aromanian: Karajoli, Caragioli)
(Greece) Falana
(Greece) Karitsa
(Greece) Kokkinopilos
(Greece) Leivadi
(Greece) Rodia

=== Aetolia-Acarnania ===
(Greece) Gouriotissa (Aromanian: Catsaru)
(Greece) Stratos (Aromanian: Sorovigli)
(Greece) Ochthia (Aromanian: Ochtu)
(Greece) Agrampela (Aromanian: Dajianda)
(Greece) Strongylovouni (Aromanian: Sturnari)
(Greece) Palaiomanina (Aromanian: Cutsombina)
(Greece) Manina Vlizianon (Aromanian: Calendzi)
(Greece) Agrinio (Aromanian: Vrachori)

=== Romania ===
(Romania) Dobruja
(Romania) Constanța (Aromanian: Custantsa)
(Romania) Săcele (Aromanian: Sãcele)
(Romania) Ovidiu
(Romania) Castelu
(Romania) Medgidia
(Romania) Cogealac
(Romania) Tariverde
(Romania) Agigea
(Romania) Techirghiol
(Romania) Beidaud
(Romania) Sarighiol de Deal
(Romania) Tulcea
(Romania) Lăstuni (Aromanian: Hagilarea)
(Romania) Stejaru (Aromanian: Eschibaba)
(Romania) Caugagia
(Romania) Ceamurlia de Jos
(Romania) Ceamurlia de Sus
(Romania) Nicolae Bălcescu
(Romania) Camena
(Romania) Vasile Alecsandri (Aromanian: Tistimelu)
(Romania) Baia
(Romania) Lunca
(Romania) Casimcea
(Romania) Panduru
(Romania) Sinoe
(Romania) Mihai Viteazu (Aromanian: Mihai Parishcu)
(Romania) Cobadin
(Romania) Slobozia
(Romania) Urziceni
(Romania) Călărasi (Aromanian: Cãlãrashi)
(Romania) Modelu (Aromanian: Mudel)
(Romania) Voluntari
(Romania) Vădeni

=== Maps ===
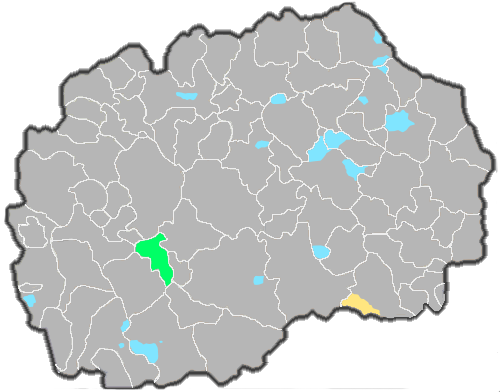
Where Aromanians are an officially recognised minority group
Areas where Aromanians are concentrated
Areas where Megleno-Romanians are concentrated

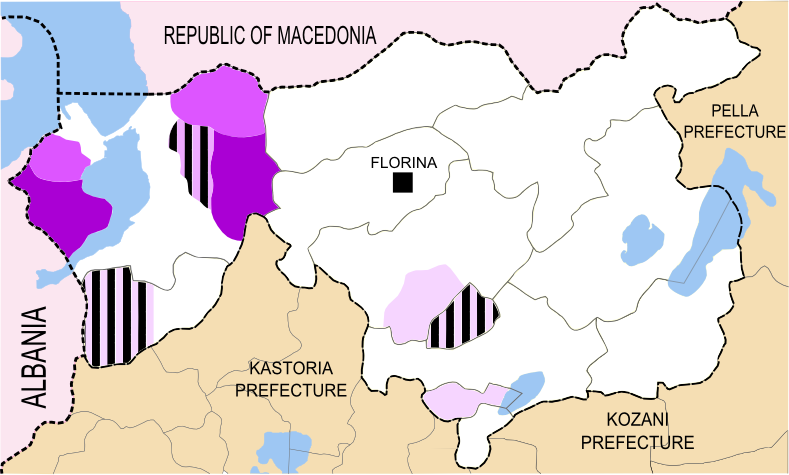
Spread of Aromanians in the Florina regional unit

== See also ==
- Vlachs
- History of Aromanians
- Aromanians in North Macedonia
- List of prominent Aromanians
