= Kavallari, Ioannina =

Kavallari Καβαλλάρι
- Community
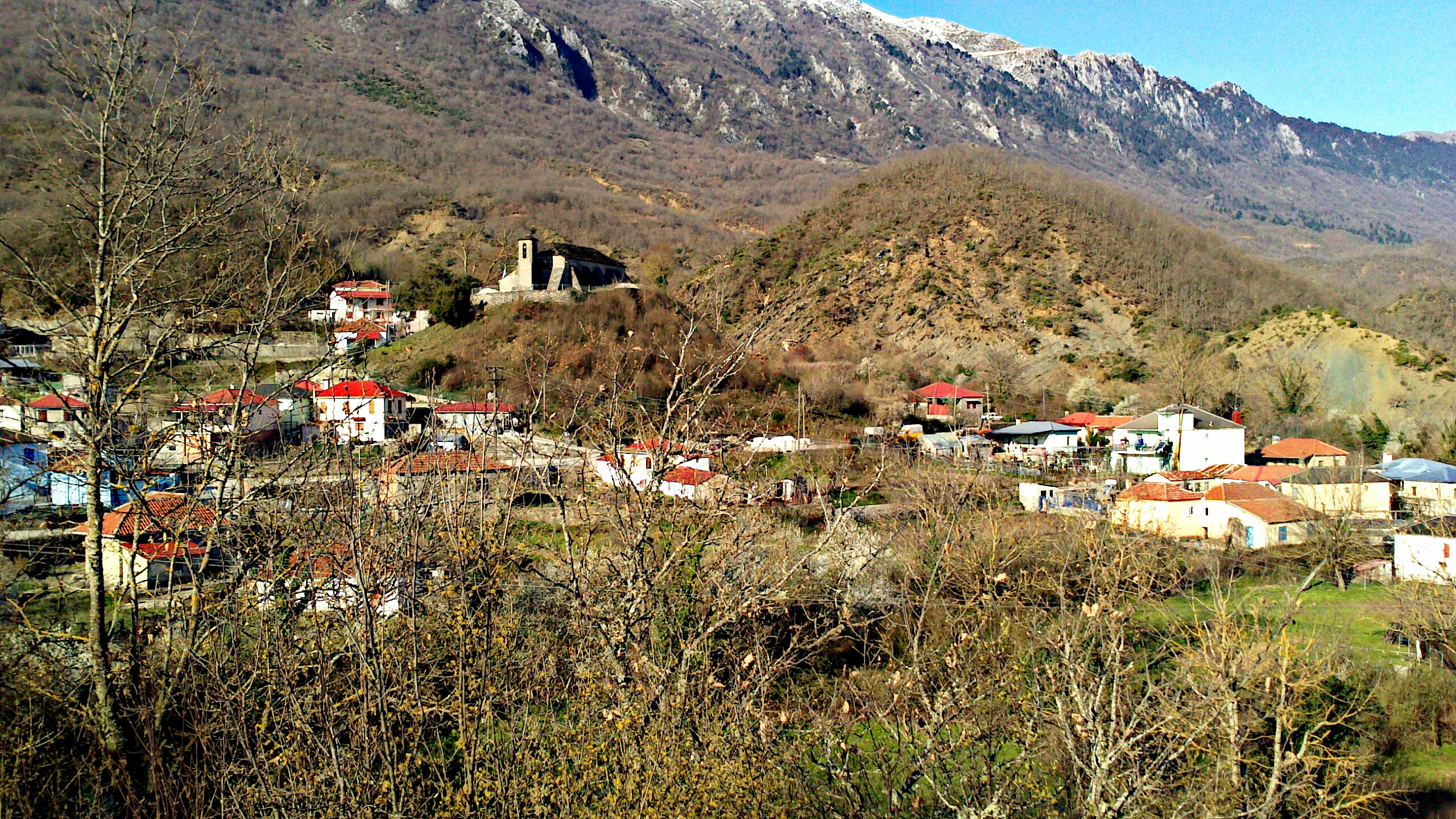
- General view of Kavallari

- Location within Greece
- Coordinates: 39°44.55′N 20°54.85′E
- Country: Greece
- Administrative region: Epirus
- Regional unit: Ioannina
- Municipality: Zagori
- Municipal unit: East Zagori

Area
  - Community: 21.031 km^{2} (8.120 sq mi)
- Elevation: 640 m (2,100 ft)

Population (2021)
  - Community: 57
  - Density: 2.7/km^{2} (7.0/sq mi)
- Time zone: UTC+2 (EET)
  - Summer (DST): UTC+3 (EEST)
- Postal code: 455 00
- Area code: +30-2656
- Vehicle registration: ΙΝ

Kavallari (Greek: Καβαλλάρι, Aromanian: Cavalar) is a village and a community of the Zagori municipality. Before the 2011 local government reform it was part of the municipality of East Zagori, of which it was a municipal district. The 2021 census recorded 57 inhabitants in the village. The community of Kavallari covers an area of 21.031 km^{2}. The village is located on the northeastern side of Mt. Mitsikeli.

== Name ==
The toponym is a proper name from the surname Kavalaris, stemming from the modern Greek kavalaris and medieval Greek kavallaris, derived from Latin caballarius 'horseman'. The word also exists in Aromanian as căvălar, plural căvălari.

== Demographics ==
The village is inhabited by Greeks, and an Aromanian community along with Arvanite families who both have assimilated into the local population. The arrival of Orthodox Albanians (locally called "Arvanites") occurred in the modern period and originate from the wider Souli area in central Greek Epirus.

== See also ==
- List of settlements in the Ioannina regional unit
