= Dilakko =

Dilakko Δίλακκο (Greek) Sheshu (Aromanian)
- Settlement
- Location within Greece
- Coordinates: 39°52.1′N 20°59.1′E
- Country: Greece
- Administrative region: Epirus
- Regional unit: Ioannina
- Municipality: Zagori
- Municipal unit: East Zagori
- Community: Elatochori
- Elevation: 1,000 m (3,300 ft)

Population (2021)
  - Total: 12
- Time zone: UTC+2 (EET)
  - Summer (DST): UTC+3 (EEST)
- Postal code: 440 14
- Area code: +30-2656
- Vehicle registration: ΙΝ

Dilakko (Greek: Δίλακκο, before 1963: Σέσο, Seso; Aromanian: Sheshu) is a village of the Zagori municipality, northwestern Greece. Before the 2011 local government reform it was part of the municipality of East Zagori. The 2021 census recorded 12 inhabitants in the village. The village of Dilakko is a part of the community of Elatochori. Dilakko is an Aromanian village.

== See also ==
- List of settlements in the Ioannina regional unit
