= Ampelos, Ioannina =

Ampelos
- Settlement
- Location within Greece
- Coordinates: 39°45′50.86″N 20°57′44.96″E
- Country: Greece
- Administrative region: Epirus
- Regional unit: Ioannina
- Municipality: Zagori
- Municipal unit: East Zagori
- Community: Greveniti
- Elevation: 596 m (1,955 ft)

Population (2021)
  - Total: 0
- Time zone: UTC+2 (EET)
  - Summer (DST): UTC+3 (EEST)

Ampelos (Greek: Άμπελος, before 1963: Τσίπιανη, Tsipiani; Aromanian: Cipiań) is a settlement in Ioannina regional unit, Epirus, Greece. It is part of the community of Greveniti. The population of Ampelos are hellenised Aromanians.

== See also ==
- List of settlements in the Ioannina regional unit
