= Kastanonas =

Kastanonas Καστανώνας
- Community
- Location within Greece
- Coordinates: 39°50.9′N 20°57.2′E
- Country: Greece
- Administrative region: Epirus
- Regional unit: Ioannina
- Municipality: Zagori
- Municipal unit: East Zagori

Area
  - Community: 9.551 km^{2} (3.688 sq mi)
- Elevation: 1,030 m (3,380 ft)

Population (2021)
  - Community: 15
  - Density: 1.6/km^{2} (4.1/sq mi)
- Time zone: UTC+2 (EET)
  - Summer (DST): UTC+3 (EEST)
- Postal code: 440 14
- Area code: +30-2656
- Vehicle registration: ΙΝ

Kastanonas (Greek: Καστανώνας, before 1927: Δραγάρι, Dragari; Aromanian: Drãgai, Drãgari) is an Aromanian village and a community of the Zagori municipality. Before the 2011 local government reform it was part of the municipality of East Zagori, of which it was a municipal district. The 2021 census recorded 15 inhabitants in the village. The community of Kastanonas covers an area of 9.551 km^{2}.

== Name ==
The placename is rendered as Dragari, and also the form Dragai. The linguist Kostas Oikonomou stated the form Dragai is derived from the form Dragari through the dissimilatory loss of the r sound. The toponym has two possible derivations. The first is from the Slavic dragarь, meaning 'Dervendjis, the one who controls the road or the passage', from draga, stemming from Old Slavic dorga 'road, passage, valley' and the suffix -arь. The second is from the Slavic dragarь, meaning 'beloved', from dragъ stemming from Old Slavic dorgъ and the suffix -arь. The suffix -arь is used to form nouns identifying a person whose occupation or identity is defined by the root word.

== Demographics ==
The population of Kastanonas are hellenised Aromanians. In 1820, Greek migrants from Demati settled in the village and contributed to the hellenisation of the Aromanian population. The Aromanian language is no longer spoken in the village following a period of assimilation.

== See also ==
- List of settlements in the Ioannina regional unit
