= Agios Minas (disambiguation) =

Agios Minas is a municipality in Chios.

Agios Minas may also refer to:

- Agios Minas (island), an island in Aegean
- Agios Minas, Ioannina, a village in Ioannina prefecture, see List of settlements in the Ioannina regional unit
