= Flambourari =

Flambourari Φλαμπουράρι (Greek) Floru, Florlu (Aromanian)
- Community
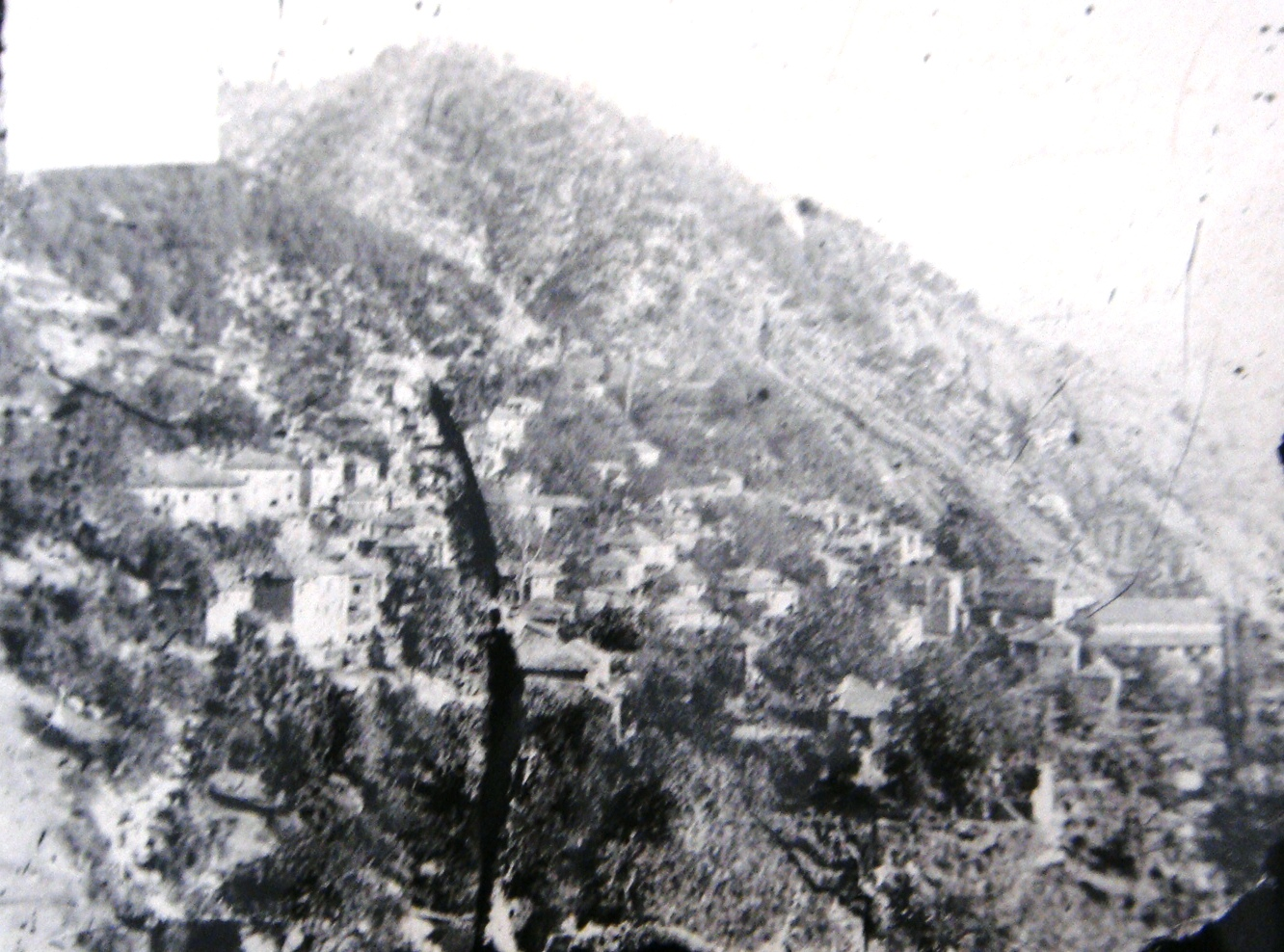
- View of Flambourari (1898). Photo by the Manaki brothers

- Location within Greece
- Coordinates: 39°51.3′N 20°59.4′E
- Country: Greece
- Administrative region: Epirus
- Regional unit: Ioannina
- Municipality: Zagori
- Municipal unit: East Zagori

Area
  - Community: 39.403 km^{2} (15.214 sq mi)
- Elevation: 1,000 m (3,300 ft)

Population (2021)
  - Community: 63
  - Density: 1.6/km^{2} (4.1/sq mi)
- Time zone: UTC+2 (EET)
  - Summer (DST): UTC+3 (EEST)
- Postal code: 440 14
- Area code: +30-2656
- Vehicle registration: ΙΝ

Flambourari (Greek: Φλαμπουράρι, Aromanian: Floru, Florlu) is a Greek village and a community of the Zagori municipality. Before the 2011 local government reform it was part of the municipality of East Zagori, of which it was a municipal district. The 2021 census recorded 63 inhabitants in the village. The community of Flambourari covers an area of 39.403 km^{2}.

== Name ==
The Greek toponym's form is feminine and derived from either the surname Flambouraris or from the profession of the same name, meaning 'flag bearer' and the root of the surname. The forms Flambouraris and Flambouriaris are themselves derived from the word flambouro(n) 'flag', stemming from flamouron with the inflection of m into b and preceded by flamoulon, where the liquid denominative l-l became l-r. The form is derived from Latin flammulum, a diminutive of flamma, -ae 'flame', and the Greek ending -aris, which evolved from the medieval -aris, earlier arios from the Latin -arius. In Aromanian, flamburar means 'flag bearer' and is derived from the Aromanian word flambura 'flag' and the suffix -ar(i).

The Aromanian name of the village is based on the personal name Floros and is derived from the Aromanian word floru meaning 'blooming, shining'.

== Demographics ==
Flambourari has an Aromanian population and is an Aromanian speaking village. In the early 21st century, elderly people were bilingual in the community language and Greek, whereas younger residents under 40 might have understood the community language but did not use it.

== See also ==
- List of settlements in the Ioannina regional unit
