= Itea, Ioannina =

Itea
- Community
- Location within Greece
- Coordinates: 39°45′58″N 21°0′37″E
- Country: Greece
- Administrative region: Epirus
- Regional unit: Ioannina
- Municipality: Zagori
- Municipal unit: East Zagori
- Elevation: 849 m (2,785 ft)

Population (2021)
  - Community: 63
- Time zone: UTC+2 (EET)
  - Summer (DST): UTC+3 (EEST)

Itea (Greek: Ιτέα, before 1955: Λιάπη, Liapi) is a settlement in Ioannina regional unit, Epirus, Greece. The village became part of Zagori for administrative reasons.

== Name ==
The toponym is derived from either the surname Liapis, stemming from the ethnonym Liapis, or directly from the ethnonym Liapis, which originates from the Albanian word Lab, -i, meaning 'a Lab, an inhabitant of Labëria'. In Northern Greek phonetics, the word became rendered as Lap (Liapi). Another factor pointing toward the Albanian origin of the toponym is the formation of the demonym for village inhabitants: Lapat-s and Lapat-sa into Liapatis and Liapatissa.

The villagers of Greveniti consider the inhabitants of Dresteniko (modern Tristeno), Liapi (Itea), and Demati to belong in some way to the same ethno-linguistic group. Lab is rendered in Aromanian as Leap and means 'predatory Albanian'.

== See also ==
- List of settlements in the Ioannina regional unit
