= Pades, Ioannina =

Pades Πάδες (Greek) Pãdz (Aromanian)
- Community
- Location within Greece
- Coordinates: 40°2′23″N 20°54′37″E
- Country: Greece
- Administrative region: Epirus
- Regional unit: Ioannina
- Municipality: Konitsa
- Municipal unit: Konitsa
- Elevation: 1,020 m (3,350 ft)

Population (2021)
  - Community: 57
- Time zone: UTC+2 (EET)
  - Summer (DST): UTC+3 (EEST)

Pades (Greek: Πάδες, Aromanian: Pãdz) is a settlement in Ioannina regional unit, Epirus, Greece. The village is situated in a ravine on the right bank of the Vjosa river.

== Name ==
The placename comes from the Greek Epirot preposition padi meaning the 'flat and smooth surface in the middle of the slope'. It stems from the Slavic term padь, with the same meaning, rather than directly from the Slavic preposition of the term, as etymologised by the linguist Max Vasmer. In Aromanian, the term is a loanword where the noun pãde means 'the flat place' and the adjective pade 'below, low'. The Aromanian rendition of the toponym, pãdz, is from the plural form of that word.

== Demographics ==
Pades has an Aromanian population and is an Aromanian speaking village. In the early 21st century, elderly people were bilingual in the community language and Greek, whereas younger residents under 40 might have understood the community language but did not use it.

== See also ==
- List of settlements in the Ioannina regional unit
