= Elatochori, Ioannina =

Elatochori Ελατοχώρι (Greek) Cernesh (Aromanian)
- Community
- Location within Greece
- Coordinates: 39°52.3′N 20°58.8′E
- Country: Greece
- Administrative region: Epirus
- Regional unit: Ioannina
- Municipality: Zagori
- Municipal unit: East Zagori

Area
  - Community: 34.802 km^{2} (13.437 sq mi)
- Elevation: 1,026 m (3,366 ft)

Population (2021)
  - Community: 85
  - Density: 2.4/km^{2} (6.3/sq mi)
- Time zone: UTC+2 (EET)
  - Summer (DST): UTC+3 (EEST)
- Postal code: 440 14
- Area code: +30-2656
- Vehicle registration: ΙΝ

Elatochori (Greek: Ελατοχώρι, before 1927: Τσερνέσι, Tsernesi; Aromanian: Cernesh) is a village and a community of the Zagori municipality, northwestern Greece. Before the 2011 local government reform it was part of the municipality of East Zagori, of which it was a municipal district. The 2021 census recorded 85 inhabitants in the community. The community of Elatochori covers an area of 34.802 km^{2}.

== Name ==
The placename is recorded in a charter from the early 14th century. The scholar Ioannis Lambridis described the name as meaning 'black place'. The linguists Gustav Weigand and Yordan Zaimov wrote that the name is from an Aromanian form Cerneshi. The scholar Petros Fourikis said the toponym is an Albanian formation with the suffix -ësi, while the linguist Phaedon Malingoudis stated the name is masculine, and comes from the Slavic form Černeš. The linguist Kostas Oikonomou wrote that an analogous form could not be confirmed for the Aromanian derivation. The Albanian derivation lacked a related root word in Albanian where the base, with the addition of the ending -ësi would have formed the placename, while the suffix is not stressed.

Oikonomou stated the etymology provided by Malingoudis is accurate. In Slavic, the personal name Černeš exists in Serbian, along with its patronymic form Črnešić, and is derived from Slavic črъnъ 'black'. Other Slavic linguistic forms include the Bulgarian črъn, črъnica 'mulberry', Serbo-Croatian crn and Slovenian črn, formed with the Slavic suffix -ešь. From those Slavic forms are derived the Greek term tserani meaning 'to tan from smoke', the verb tserniazo 'to blacken', the Aromanian tserniciu and tsirniciu 'sycamore tree producing black berries', and the Romanian cerni 'blacken, turn black, become bitter', cerneală 'ink'.

== Demographics ==
Elatochori has an Aromanian population and is an Aromanian speaking village. In the early 21st century, elderly people were bilingual in the community language and Greek, whereas younger residents under 40 might have understood the community language but did not use it.

== Administrative division ==
The community of Elatochori consists of two separate settlements:

- Dilakko (population 12 as of 2021)
- Elatochori (population 73)

== See also ==
- List of settlements in the Ioannina regional unit
