= List of settlements in the Ioannina regional unit =

This is a list of settlements in the Ioannina regional unit, Greece.

- Achladies
- Aetomilitsa
- Aetopetra, Konitsa
- Aetopetra, Zitsa
- Aetorrachi
- Agia Anastasia
- Agia Marina
- Agia Paraskevi, Konitsa
- Agia Paraskevi, Zagori
- Agia Triada
- Agia Varvara
- Agios Andreas
- Agios Ioannis
- Agios Kosmas
- Agios Minas
- Agios Nikolaos
- Aidonochori
- Alepochori
- Amarantos
- Amfithea
- Ampeleia
- Ampelochori
- Anargyroi
- Anatoli
- Anatoliki
- Anilio
- Ano Lapsista
- Ano Pedina
- Ano Ravenia
- Anthochori, Dodoni
- Anthochori, Metsovo
- Anthrakitis
- Areti
- Argyrochori
- Aristi
- Armata
- Artopoula
- Asfaka
- Asimochori
- Asprangeloi
- Asprochori
- Asvestochori
- Avgo
- Bafra
- Baousioi
- Bestia
- Bizani
- Charavgi
- Charokopi
- Chinka
- Chionades
- Chouliarades
- Chrysorrachi
- Chrysovitsa
- Dafnofyto
- Dafnoula
- Delvinaki
- Delvinakopoulo
- Demati
- Derviziana
- Despotiko
- Dikorfo
- Dilofo
- Dimokorio
- Dipotamo
- Distrato
- Dodoni
- Doliana
- Doliani
- Dolo
- Dovla
- Dragopsa
- Dramesioi
- Drosochori
- Drosopigi
- Drymades
- Ekklisochori
- Elafos
- Elafotopos
- Elati
- Elatochori
- Elefthero
- Eleousa
- Elliniko
- Episkopiko
- Exochi, Ioannina
- Exochi, Konitsa
- Farangi
- Flambourari
- Fortosi
- Foteino
- Fourka
- Fragkades
- Gannadio
- Gavrisioi
- Georganoi
- Geroplatanos
- Giourganista
- Gorgopotamos
- Grammeno
- Granitsa
- Granitsopoula
- Greveniti
- Grimpovo
- Ieromnimi
- Iliochori
- Iliokali
- Iliorrachi
- Ioannina Island
- Ioannina
- Itea
- Kakolakkos
- Kalarites
- Kalentzi
- Kallithea, Konitsa
- Kallithea, Mastorochoria
- Kalochori
- Kaloutas
- Kalpaki
- Kapesovo
- Karitsa
- Karyes
- Kastani
- Kastaniani
- Kastanonas
- Kastritsa
- Katamachi
- Katarraktis
- Kato Lapsista
- Kato Meropi
- Kato Pedina
- Kato Ravenia
- Katsikas
- Kavallari
- Kavasila
- Kedros
- Kefalochori
- Kefalovryso
- Kerasia
- Kerasovo
- Kipoi
- Kleidonia, Konitsa
- Kleidonia, Mastorochoria
- Klimatia
- Kokkinochoma
- Konitsa
- Kontsika
- Kopani
- Koritiani
- Kosmira
- Kostaniani
- Kouklesi
- Kouklioi
- Koukouli
- Koumaria
- Kourenta
- Koutseli
- Kranoula
- Krapsi
- Krya
- Kryfovo
- Kryoneri
- Kryovrysi
- Ktismata
- Lagkada
- Laista
- Lavdani
- Lefkothea
- Leptokarya
- Ligkiades
- Ligopsa
- Limni
- Lippa
- Lithino
- Lofiskos
- Longades
- Lyngos
- Makrino
- Manassis
- Manoliasa
- Manteio
- Marmara
- Matsouki
- Mavronoros
- Mavropoulo
- Mavrovouni
- Mazaraki
- Mazi
- Mazia
- Mega Gardiki
- Mega Peristeri
- Megali Gotista
- Melia
- Melingoi
- Melissopetra
- Meropi
- Mesovouni
- Metamorfosi
- Metsovo
- Michalitsi
- Mikra Gotista
- Mikro Peristeri
- Milea
- Molista
- Molyvdoskepastos
- Monastiri
- Monodendri
- Monolithi
- Mousiotitsa
- Mouzakaioi
- Myrodafni
- Negades
- Negrades
- Neochori
- Neochoropoulo
- Neokaisareia
- Nikanoras
- Oraiokastro
- Oreino Xirovaltou
- Oxya
- Pades
- Palaiochori, Dodoni
- Palaiochori, Tzoumerka
- Palaiopyrgos
- Palaioselli
- Paliouri
- Papingo
- Parakalamos
- Pardalitsa
- Pedini
- Perama
- Peratis
- Perdika
- Peristeri
- Perivleptos
- Pesta
- Petra
- Petralona
- Petrovouni
- Petsali
- Pigadia
- Pigi, Ioannina
- Plagia
- Plaisia
- Platanas
- Platania, Dodoni
- Platania, Ioannina
- Platanoussa
- Plikati
- Pogoniani
- Polydoro
- Polygyros
- Polylofo
- Pontikates
- Potamia
- Potistika
- Pournia
- Pramanta
- Prosilio
- Protopappas
- Psina
- Pyrgos
- Pyrsogianni
- Radovizi
- Raftanaioi
- Raiko
- Ravenia
- Repetista
- Riachovo
- Rodotopi
- Romanos
- Roupia
- Seniko
- Seriziana
- Serviana
- Sistrouni
- Sitaria
- Sitsaina
- Skamneli
- Sklivani
- Smyrtia
- Soulopoulo
- Spothoi
- Stavraki
- Stavroskiadi
- Stratinista
- Syrrako
- Teriachi
- Terovo
- Theriakisi
- Tristeno
- Tsepelovo
- Vageniti
- Valanidia
- Vaptistis
- Vargiades
- Varlaam
- Vasiliki
- Vasiliko
- Vasilopoulo
- Vatatades
- Vathypedo
- Vereniki
- Vissani
- Vitsa
- Vlachatano
- Votonosi
- Vouliasta
- Vounoplagia
- Vourmpiani
- Voutsaras
- Vovousa
- Vradeto
- Vrosina
- Vrotismeni
- Vrysochori
- Vrysoula
- Zalongo
- Zitsa
- Zoodochos
- Zotiko

== See also ==
- List of towns and villages of Greece
