= Tristeno =

Tristeno Τρίστενο
- Community
- Location within Greece
- Coordinates: 39°47.6′N 21°0.1′E
- Country: Greece
- Administrative region: Epirus
- Regional unit: Ioannina
- Municipality: Zagori
- Municipal unit: East Zagori

Area
  - Community: 15.325 km^{2} (5.917 sq mi)
- Elevation: 940 m (3,080 ft)

Population (2021)
  - Community: 55
  - Density: 3.6/km^{2} (9.3/sq mi)
- Time zone: UTC+2 (EET)
  - Summer (DST): UTC+3 (EEST)
- Postal code: 440 14
- Area code: +30-2656
- Vehicle registration: ΙΝ

Tristeno (Greek: Τρίστενο; before 1927: Δρεστενίκον, Drestenikon) is a village and a community of the Zagori municipality. Before the 2011 local government reform it was part of the municipality of East Zagori, of which it was a municipal district. The 2021 census recorded 55 inhabitants in the village. The community of Tristeno covers an area of 15.325 km^{2}.

== Name ==
The village is recorded as Tristeanikon in 1319. The linguist Max Vasmer wrote that the village name is linked to Southern Slavic toponym Trъstěnikъ, from where the form Tristeanikon arose with a rendering of the Slavic ě as ea (ia) in Greek.

Trъstěnikъ is formed from the Slavic noun trьstь meaning 'reed' and the adjectival ending -ěnъ, becoming trъstěnъ, with the noun-forming suffix -ikъ used to turn adjectival forms into nouns. The form Tristeaniko(n) later became (N)tresteniko by replacing ea with e through the influence of a false etymology based on the Greek tri stena 'three narrows'. The new official Greek name, Tristeno, was formed from tria stena based on the village location below four hills and near an area where three pits formed between the geographical features.

D. Raiou wrote that the original placename Dresteniko (Dristenicu in Aromanian) is from the toponymic form Tristeno with the prefix of the Aromanian preposition n, 'in', from Latin in, and the Aromanian diminutive suffix -icu, meaning 'small Tristeno'. The linguist Kostas Oikonomou stated that while the diminutive toponymic formation is possible, it is untenable as it presupposes the existence of a 'big Tristeno' which does not exist.

== History ==
Tristeno was first recorded in a golden edict of 1319 (a type of concession) of Byzantine Emperor Andronikos II.

In the late 19th century Ioannis Lambridis wrote the village was located in a valley, "crossed downwards by a deep pit" and traditionally populated by Albanian shepherds, Aromanian was not spoken and the village language was Greek with many Albanian words.

Although no memories are preserved among the local population of any past Orthodox Christian Albanian presence, Albanian linguistic remnants in the local Greek speech may point that they were the first settlers of the village. This would also explain the other local Aromanian name of the village Arbineshi ("Albanian village") given by the neighbouring Aromanian area of Zagori. Linguist Thede Kahl (1999) writes the village might have been a mixed Albanian–Aromanian village, while historian Asterios Koukoudis (2003) states that it should not be included among Aromanian villages. The villagers of Greveniti consider the inhabitants of Liapi (modern Itea), Dresteniko (Tristeno) and Demati to belong in some way to the same ethno-linguistic group.

== See also ==
- List of settlements in the Ioannina regional unit

== Sources ==
- Kahl, Thede (1999). "Die Zagóri-Dörfer in Nordgriechenland: Wirtschaftliche Einheit – ethnische Vielfalt" [The Zagóri Villages in Northern Greece: Economic Unity – Ethnic Diversity]. Ethnologia Balkanica (in German). 3. Archived (PDF) from the original on 21 February 2026.
- Koukoudis, Asterios (2003). The Vlachs: Metropolis and Diaspora. Zitros Publications. ISBN 9789607760869.
- Oikonomou, Kostas E. (2002). Τα οικωνύμια του νομού Ιωαννίνων. Γλωσσολογική εξέταση [The oikonyms of the prefecture of Ioannina. A linguistic examination] (PDF) (in Greek). Nomarchiaki Aftodioikisi Ioanninon. ISBN 9789608316010. Archived (PDF) from the original on 25 November 2024.
