= Morave =

Morave may refer to:

- Moravë, Berat County, Albania
- Morave, Mawal, Pune district, Maharashtra, India
