= Votonosi =

Votonosi Βοτονόσι (Greek) Vutunoshi (Aromanian)
- Community
- Location within Greece
- Coordinates: 39°46′4″N 21°7′9″E
- Country: Greece
- Administrative region: Epirus
- Regional unit: Ioannina
- Municipality: Metsovo
- Municipal unit: Metsovo
- Elevation: 1,020 m (3,350 ft)

Population (2021)
  - Community: 202
- Time zone: UTC+2 (EET)
  - Summer (DST): UTC+3 (EEST)

Votonosi (Greek: Βοτονόσι, Aromanian: Vutunoshi) is a settlement in Ioannina regional unit, Epirus, Greece. At the location called Katafy near the village are ruins of an ancient wall. The site of the village has a pass linking Metsovo with Greek Macedonia.

== Name ==
The toponym is derived from the Slavic personal name Budnoš, with the o sound developing into u and the Slavic b and d becoming n and t in Greek. The personal name Budnoš is formed from the Slavic Bulgarian adjective byden, -dna, -dno, meaning 'awake, alert', and the Slavic suffix -oš(ь).

== Demographics ==
Voutonosi has an Aromanian population and is an Aromanian speaking village. In the early 21st century, elderly people were bilingual in the community language and Greek, whereas younger residents under 40 might have understood the community language but did not use it.

== See also ==
- List of settlements in the Ioannina regional unit
