= Artopoula =

Artopoula Αρτοπούλα
- Community
- Location within Greece
- Coordinates: 39°29.8′N 20°41.3′E
- Country: Greece
- Administrative region: Epirus
- Regional unit: Ioannina
- Municipality: Dodoni
- Municipal unit: Selloi

Population (2021)
  - Community: 98
- Time zone: UTC+2 (EET)
  - Summer (DST): UTC+3 (EEST)
- Vehicle registration: ΙΝ

Artopoula (Greek: Αρτοπούλα) is a village in the Ioannina regional unit in Greece and the municipality of Dodoni. It is situated at 500 m above sea level, in the hills near the upper course of the river Tyria. It is 6 km south of Koumaria, 6 km northwest of Lippa, 9 km southwest of Dodoni and 24 km southwest of Ioannina.

== Population ==
Historical population
Year	Pop.	±%
1981	228	—
1991	211	−7.5%
2001	120	−43.1%
2011	123	+2.5%
2021	98	−20.3%

== See also ==
- List of settlements in the Ioannina regional unit
