= Karyes, Ioannina =

Karyes
- Community
- Location within Greece
- Coordinates: 39°43′58″N 20°55′57″E
- Country: Greece
- Administrative region: Epirus
- Regional unit: Ioannina
- Municipality: Zagori
- Municipal unit: East Zagori
- Elevation: 638 m (2,093 ft)
- Time zone: UTC+2 (EET)
  - Summer (DST): UTC+3 (EEST)

Karyes (Greek: Καρυές, before 1927: Μογγλιούς, Monglious) is a settlement in the Ioannina regional unit, Epirus, Greece.

== Name ==
In the late 19th century, the scholar Ioannis Lambridis rendered the placename as Monglioi and described it as a 'cloudy place'. The toponym is a proper noun derived from the patronymic or andronymic Moungouliou. It originated from the Greek feminine prepositional phrase sts muŋgl'us (stis Moungoulious), which was interpreted as the masculine plural accusative stous Moungoulious, eventually becoming the nominative form Monglioi.

The name Moungouliou is formed from the surname Moungoulis and the suffix -ou. This surname is either derived from Moungos and the diminutive suffix -oulis, or from Megoulis, stemming from the Albanian word mjegull/ë, -a meaning 'fog', where 'e' shifted to u' due to labialisation caused by the preceding m sound.

== Demographics ==
The village is inhabited by Greeks.

== See also ==
- List of settlements in the Ioannina regional unit
