= Kaloutas =

- Community
- Location within Greece
- Coordinates: 39°46′54″N 20°50′9″E
- Country: Greece
- Administrative region: Epirus
- Regional unit: Ioannina
- Municipality: Zagori
- Municipal unit: Central Zagori
- Elevation: 796 m (2,612 ft)

Population (2021)
  - Community: 16
- Time zone: UTC+2 (EET)
  - Summer (DST): UTC+3 (EEST)

Kaloutas (Greek: Καλουτάς, before 1940: Καλωτάς, Kalotas) is a settlement in Ioannina regional unit, Epirus, Greece. The village is located at the north eastern base of Mount Mitsikeli.

== Name ==
The toponym is derived from the Slavic personal name Kalota and stems from the word kalъ 'black' and the Slavic suffix -ota.

== History ==
In the 19th century, the scholar Ioannis Lambridis wrote about a family with the name Kalota in Ioannina who flourished during the 16th century. According to oral tradition, there were two brothers from the Kalota family, one who founded the village of Kalota and the other established the later deserted settlement of Kioutsouk Kalota, near Greveniti.

== Demographics ==
The village is inhabited by Greeks.

== See also ==
- List of settlements in the Ioannina regional unit
