= Katarraktis, Ioannina =

Katarraktis
- Community
- Location within Greece
- Coordinates: 39°47′1″N 20°36′33″E
- Country: Greece
- Administrative region: Epirus
- Regional unit: Ioannina
- Municipality: Pogoni
- Municipal unit: Ano Kalamas
- Elevation: 508 m (1,667 ft)

Population (2021)
  - Community: 32
- Time zone: UTC+2 (EET)
  - Summer (DST): UTC+3 (EEST)

Katarraktis (Greek: Καταρράκτης, before 1955: Γλύζιανη, Glyziani) is a settlement in Ioannina regional unit, Epirus, Greece. The village is located in the region of Kourentochoria.

== Name ==
The placename is rendered in the Chrysobull of 1319 as Gloxiani, a form which scholar Panagiotis Aravantinos corrects to Glyziani. Linguist Kostas Oikonomou wrote that the medieval scribe of the chrysobull may have recorded u as o and z as x to shift the tone of pronunciation and restore the literary form, rendering the name as Gloxiani. From that form, linguist Max Vasmer derived the name from the Slavic glogъ 'thorn, hawthorn'.

Oikonomou states the placename is a Slavic formation from the Slavic word glista meaning 'tapeworm (disease), earthworm, roundworm' and the suffix -jane producing the form glistjane, derived from earlier γlizdjane. The Slavic g became γ through the Greek inflection of the consonant cluster stj into zdj, a product of voiced assimilation, rendering the form as γl'ižane, -i, with the loss of d in the cluster žd. The new name Katarraktis means 'waterfalls' in Greek.

== History ==
In the late Ottoman period, the village was a chiflik (estate) and owned by an Ottoman landlord who sold it and the chiflik of Sakellariko, a nearby village to an Orthodox Greek man from southern Epirus. Soon after Ottoman rule ceased, the territory was incorporated into the Greek state in 1913 and the Greek estate owner was allowed to keep his chiflik preventing the redistribution of lands to the village population.

Greek authorities permitted the inhabitants to buy out the estate owner, a process which concluded in 1964 after funds were raised with the assistance of villagers working in Athens and in the oversees diaspora. By the early 21st century, a large part of the village population has resettled in Ioannina.

== See also ==
- List of settlements in the Ioannina regional unit
