= Armata, Ioannina =

Armata Άρματα (Greek) Armatã (Aromanian)
- Community
- Location within Greece
- Coordinates: 40°2′2″N 20°57′57″E
- Country: Greece
- Administrative region: Epirus
- Regional unit: Ioannina
- Municipality: Konitsa
- Municipal unit: Konitsa
- Elevation: 1,126 m (3,694 ft)

Population (2021)
  - Community: 31
- Time zone: UTC+2 (EET)
  - Summer (DST): UTC+3 (EEST)

Armata (Greek: Άρματα, before 1928: Αρμάτοβον, Armatovon; Aromanian: Armatã) is a settlement in Ioannina regional unit, Epirus, Greece. The village is situated on the right bank of the Vjosa river.

== Name ==
The placename is derived from the personal name Armatos and the Slavic ending -ovo, a suffix which became productive in Greek, as shown by the toponyms in -ovo with a Greek subject or andronyms. The personal name Armatos comes from the medieval term armatos, indicating a 'Byzantine armed soldier' from the Latin armatus meaning 'armed'.

== Demographics ==
Armata has an Aromanian population and is an Aromanian speaking village. In the early 21st century, elderly people were bilingual in the community language and Greek, whereas younger residents under 40 might have understood the community language but did not use it.

== See also ==
- List of settlements in the Ioannina regional unit
