= Mesovouni =

Mesovouni (Greek: Μεσοβούνι) may refer to several places in Greece:

- Mesovouni, Ioannina, a village in the municipal unit Central Zagori, Ioannina regional unit
- Mesovouni, Karditsa, a village in the municipal unit Argithea, Karditsa regional unit
- Mesovouni, Thesprotia, a village in the municipal unit Margariti, Thesprotia
