= Demati =

- Community
- Location within Greece
- Coordinates: 39°44′00″N 21°01′19″E
- Country: Greece
- Administrative region: Epirus
- Regional unit: Ioannina
- Municipality: Zagori
- Municipal unit: East Zagori
- Elevation: 764 m (2,507 ft)

Population (2021)
  - Community: 68
- Time zone: UTC+2 (EET)
  - Summer (DST): UTC+3 (EEST)

Demati (Greek: Δεμάτι) is a settlement in Ioannina regional unit, Epirus, Greece.

== Name ==
The toponym is derived from either the Albanian name Demat, also Dem, the origin for the Greek surname Demos, or from the Greek surname Dematis, which is from the Albanian Demat or its noun demati. The Albanian name Demat originates from the Albanian dem, definite dem-i, meaning 'calf', and the Albanian suffix -at, used in various contexts for demonyms to indicate familial belonging and the homeland.

Several other factors point toward an Albanian origin of the toponym. The demonyms Dematatis, Dematatissa incorporate the Albanian suffix -at, and the villagers of Greveniti consider the inhabitants of Dresteniko (modern Tristeno), Liapi (modern Itea), and Demati to belong in some way to the same ethno-linguistic group, alongside the Albanian influence in regional toponymy.

== See also ==
- List of settlements in the Ioannina regional unit
