= Anthrakitis =

- Community
- Location within Greece
- Coordinates: 39°45′57″N 20°51′57″E
- Country: Greece
- Administrative region: Epirus
- Regional unit: Ioannina
- Municipality: Zagori
- Municipal unit: East Zagori
- Elevation: 764 m (2,507 ft)

Population (2021)
  - Community: 49
- Time zone: UTC+2 (EET)
  - Summer (DST): UTC+3 (EEST)

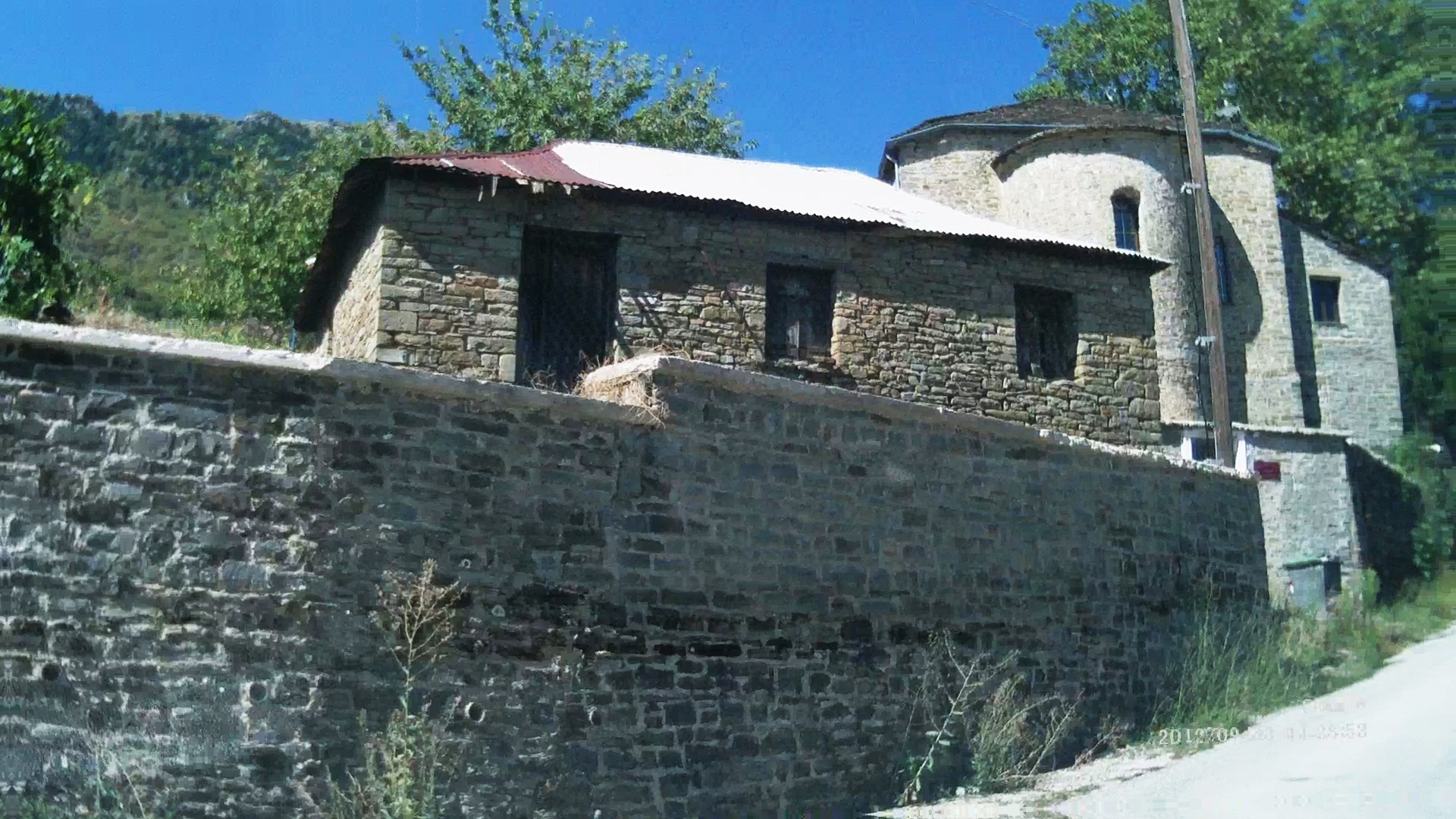
Anthrakitis

Anthrakitis (Greek: Ανθρακίτης, before 1947: Καμινιάς, Kaminias) is a settlement in Ioannina regional unit, Epirus, Greece.

== Name ==
The toponym stems from the Modern Greek noun kamini, derived from the Ancient Greek kaminos and the suffix -ia, from -ea. Nouns of the word such as kaminia mean 'the content or one-time product of a kiln' and kamineia 'the firing'. The word is a loanword in the Romance languages, the Slavic languages and in Albanian; it is also used in Southern Italian placenames.

== Demographics ==
The village is inhabited by Greeks, Arvanite families who assimilated into the local population and some Sarakatsani who settled in the village during the early 20th century. The arrival of Orthodox Albanians (locally called "Arvanites") occurred in the modern period and originate from the wider Souli area in central Greek Epirus, while the Sarakatsani are Greek speakers.

== See also ==
- List of settlements in the Ioannina regional unit
