= Doliani =

Village in Zagori, Greece

Doliani Δόλιανη Dolani
- Community
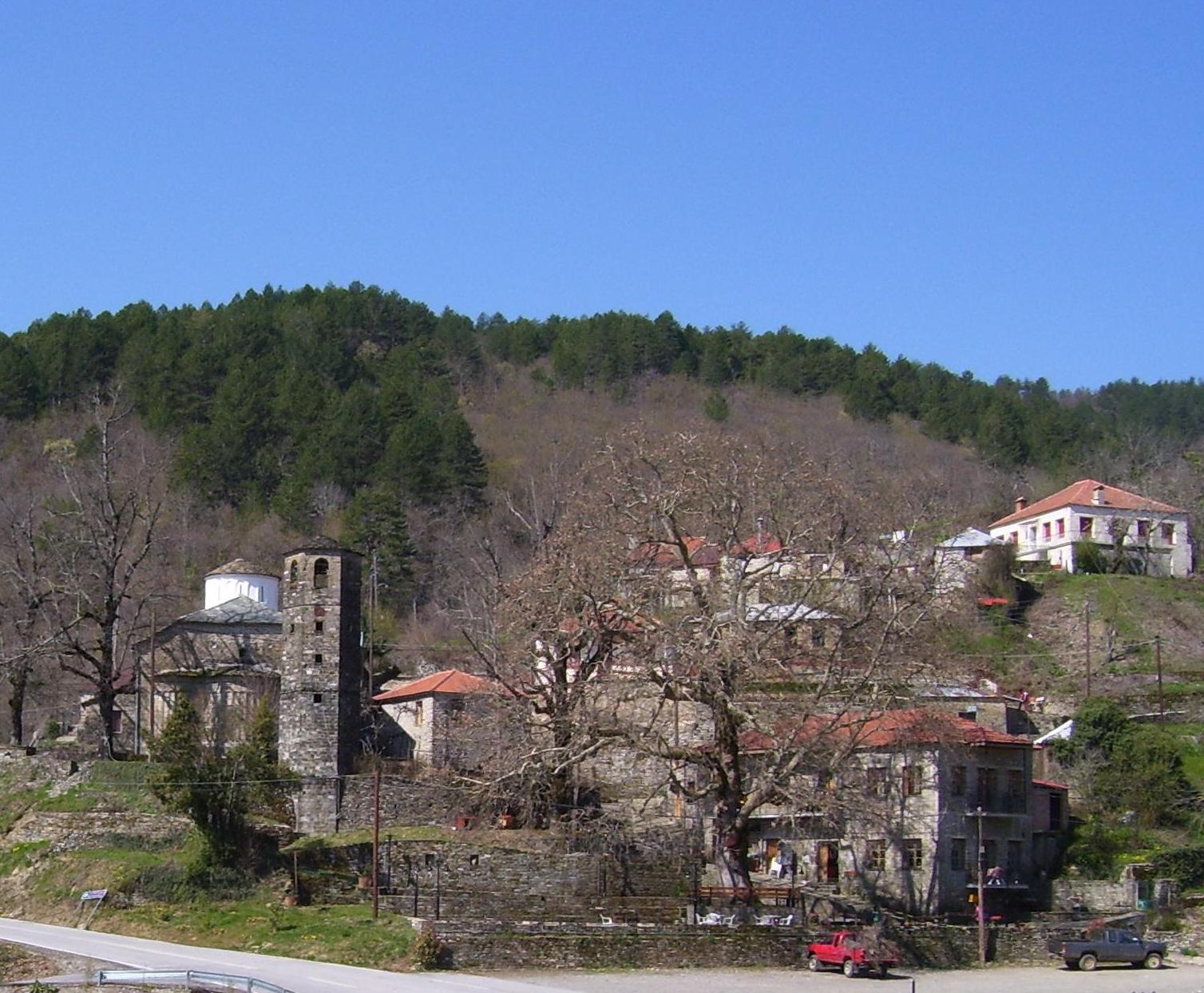

- Location within Greece
- Coordinates: 39°49.3′N 20°57.1′E
- Country: Greece
- Administrative region: Epirus
- Regional unit: Ioannina
- Municipality: Zagori
- Municipal unit: East Zagori

Area
  - Community: 17.276 km^{2} (6.670 sq mi)
- Elevation: 920 m (3,020 ft)

Population (2021)
  - Community: 51
  - Density: 3.0/km^{2} (7.6/sq mi)
- Time zone: UTC+2 (EET)
  - Summer (DST): UTC+3 (EEST)
- Postal code: 440 14
- Area code: +30-2656
- Vehicle registration: ΙΝ

Doliani (Greek: Δόλιανη, between 1955 and 1984: Νέον Αμαρούσιον, Neon Amarousion; Aromanian: Dolani) is a village and a community of the Zagori municipality in Ioannina Regional Unit, Greece. Before the 2011 local government reform it was part of the municipality of East Zagori, of which it was a municipal district. The 2021 census recorded 51 inhabitants in the village. The community of Doliani covers an area of 17.276 km^{2}.

== Name ==
In the late nineteenth century, the scholar Ioannis Lambridis described the geographical location of the village of Doliani as 'ravine-like' and as a 'depression'. The linguist Max Vasmer derived the toponym from the Slavic dolъ meaning 'the valley', with the name Doljane indicating 'inhabitants of the valley'. The linguist Kostas Oikonomou stated the village is located in a ravine, making the use of the word dolъ with its original meaning 'the hole, the pit, the ravine' applicable, aligning with the description given by Lambridis.

== Demographics ==
The population of Doliani are Hellenised Aromanians. The Aromanian language is no longer spoken in the village following a period of assimilation.

== See also ==
- List of settlements in the Ioannina regional unit
