= Vissani =

Vissani Βήσσανη
- Community
- Location within Greece
- Coordinates: 39°56′N 20°32′E
- Country: Greece
- Administrative region: Epirus
- Regional unit: Ioannina
- Municipality: Pogoni
- Municipal unit: Delvinaki

Population (2021)
  - Community: 236
- Time zone: UTC+2 (EET)
  - Summer (DST): UTC+3 (EEST)

Vissani (Greek: Βήσσανη) is a village in the municipal unit of Delvinaki, Ioannina regional unit, in the Epirus region of northwestern Greece. It is situated in the mountainous Pogoni area near the Albanian border, at 750 m above sea level. A small road connects Vissani with the Greek National Road 22 Kakavia - Kalpaki. The village is located on the road to Konitsa and on a high point of a long ridge.

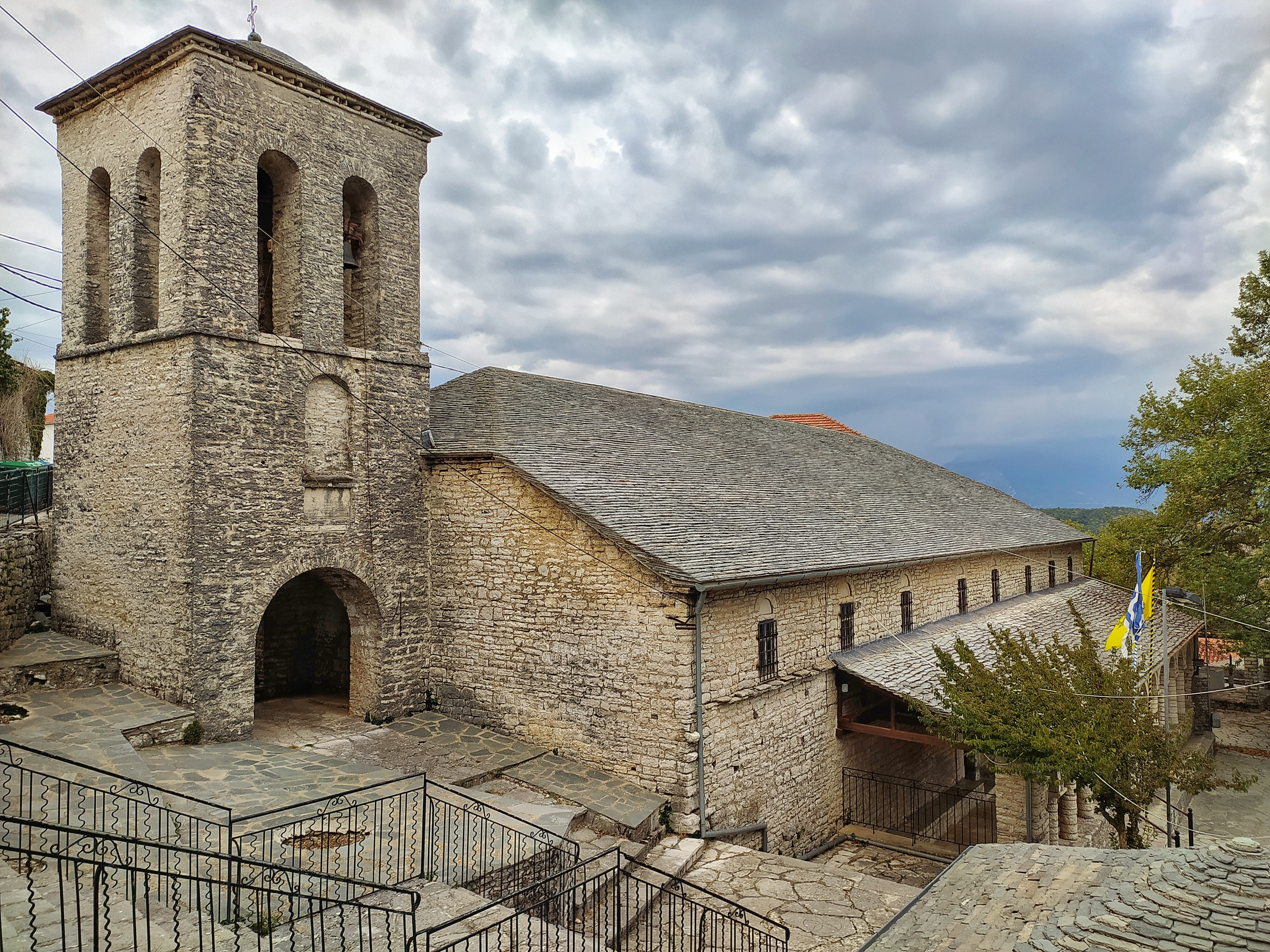
Saint Nicholas (1791)

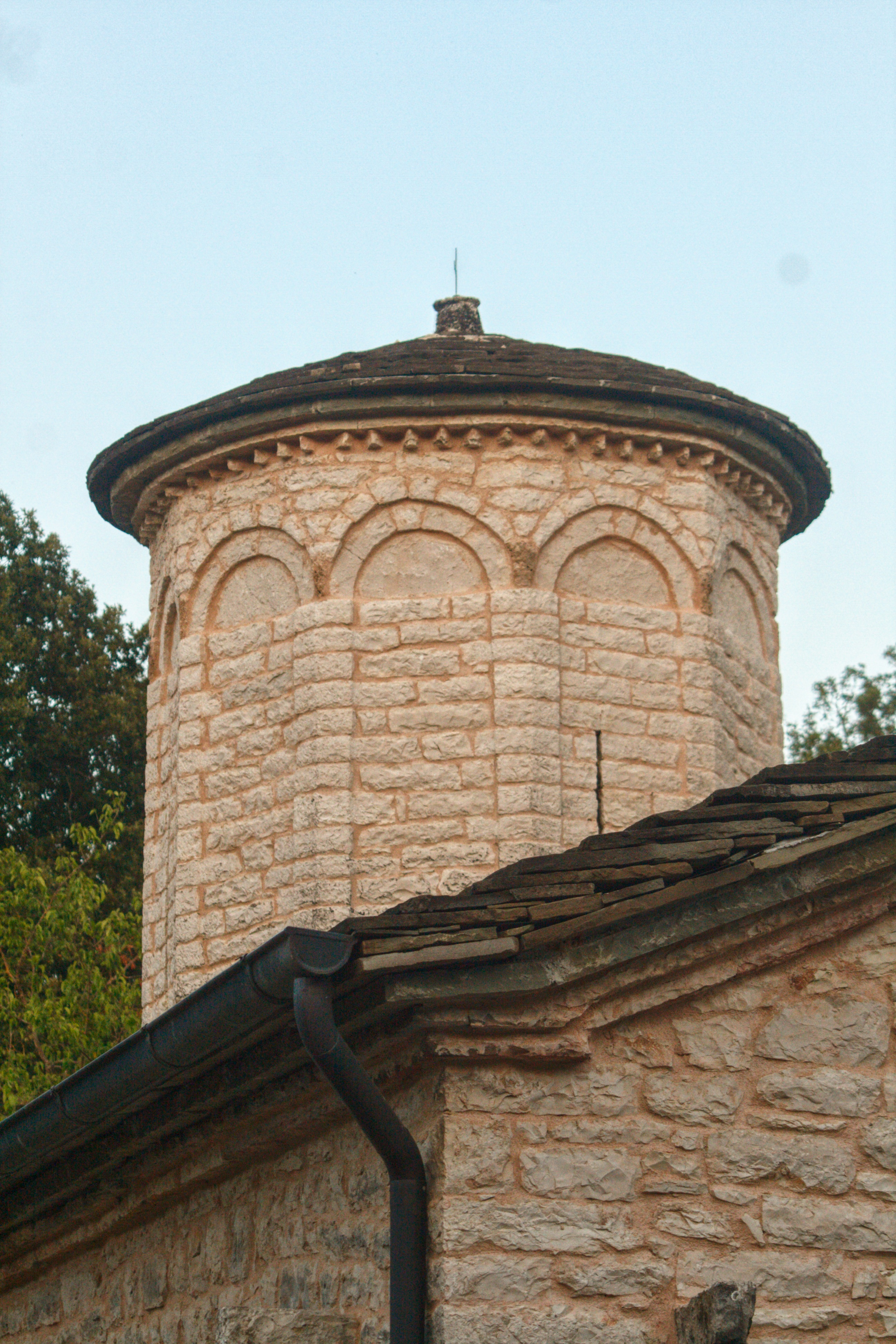
Avel monastery(1760)

== Name ==
The toponym Vys(s)iani meaning 'nape, valley' is linked by linguist Max Vasmer to the Slavic form Vyšan and Bulgarian Višan, derived from the Slavic root vyš 'high' and the suffix -anь, involving a Slavic shift of y into i. Among older chroniclers and historians, the š sound was often rendered within the placename with a double ss to indicate its thick and heavy pronunciation, a choice linguist Kostas Oikonomou states is etymologically justified. While the toponym through false etymologies has been linked to vyssino 'sour cherry' and vissa, Oikonomou wrote the connection to vyssino is not possible as the suffix -(j)ane is not productive in Greek and used only in the formation of Slavic placenames.

== History ==
Vissani was founded in the 14th century, and grew during Ottoman rule. It became a part of Greece after the Balkan Wars in 1913. The village retains elements of its traditional architecture. In the center of the village is the church of Saint Nicholas from 1791, decorated with frescoes. The village houses were built by craftsmen from the villages of Pyrsogianni and Vourbiani. Vissani is the birthplace of Kitsos Harisiadis, one of the greatest traditional clarinetists of Epirus, who mastered and taught the tradition of playing the "miroloi".

== Demographics ==
Year	Population
1981	417
1991	365
2001	426
2011	420
2021	236

The village is inhabited by Greeks who refer to themselves as Graikoi; they also use the term Hellenes to describe both themselves and other local ethnic communities. The village practiced endogamy; few women married outside Vissani, while brides came from several villages such as Delvinaki. The initial settlement of nomadic Aromanians in Vissani occurred in 1925 and their registration on the municipal roll was slow as the official acceptance of their presence in the village took time. The Vissani Aromanians maintained close family and social relations with the Aromanians of Kefalovryso. Some Aromanians settled in the village following the interwar period. The Aromanian population of Vissani use the term R(u)mainoi for themselves.

The demographic increase of Aromanians became more balanced in the village following the settlement of Greek–speaking inhabitants from Platanoussa in 1958. Some prejudices existed among the original villagers and until 1960 most Aromanians of Vissani were excluded from the village cultural activities such as dances and festivals of their fellow Greek villagers. The situation changed following the migration by some Aromanians to Germany who returned with accumulated wealth to Vissani and gradually the Aromanian community became integrated in the village. In the late 20th century, a few Roma in the village were musicians.

== See also ==
- List of settlements in the Ioannina regional unit
