= Areti, Ioannina =

Areti
- Community
- Location within Greece
- Coordinates: 39°49′47″N 20°34′49″E
- Country: Greece
- Administrative region: Epirus
- Regional unit: Ioannina
- Municipality: Pogoni
- Municipal unit: Ano Kalamas
- Elevation: 508 m (1,667 ft)

Population (2021)
  - Community: 51
- Time zone: UTC+2 (EET)
  - Summer (DST): UTC+3 (EEST)

Areti (Greek: Αρετή, before 1955: Γκρίμπιανη, Gkrimpiani) is a settlement in Ioannina regional unit, Epirus, Greece. Ancient ruins are located nearby the village, identified with Trambya or Trambyla, an ancient Epirote city.

== Name ==
The village is recorded in the Chronicle of Ioannina (1389) as Vrimbiani, although linguist Kostas Oikonomou states it ought to be rendered as G(k)rimbiani. The toponym stems from the Slavic form Gribjane, indicating 'the inhabitants of Gribi'. The Slavic suffix -jane, plural -jani is used in placename formations where nouns denote the inhabitants of the area or members of a household, in reference to the subject. The etymology of Gribi is derived from the Slavic noun gribъ 'mushroom'. The village is located in an area abundant in mushrooms from April to May and September to October. The 19th century derivation of Gribiani by the scholar Panagiotis Aravantinos is a false etymology from the Greek Epirote word g(k)rybóz 'hunchback'. The new name Areti means 'virtue' in Greek.

== History ==
During the Ottoman period, the village was located in the mountains and was often inaccessible, which secluded it from the Ottoman authorities who controlled the plain. In the early 20th century Ottoman rule ended and the village was moved down toward a more accessible location. The original village location became known as Paliogribiani 'old Gribiani', while the new settlement was named Gribiani, later renamed as Areti.

== See also ==
- List of settlements in the Ioannina regional unit
