= Monolithi =

Beach in Preveza regional unit, Greece

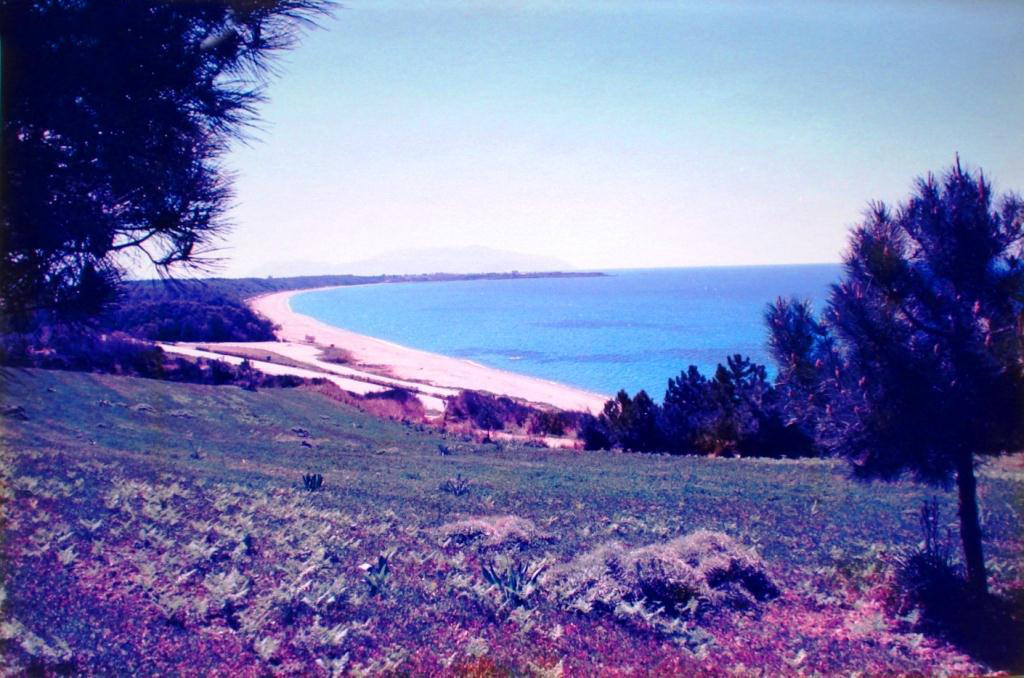
Monolithi Coast from the Hill

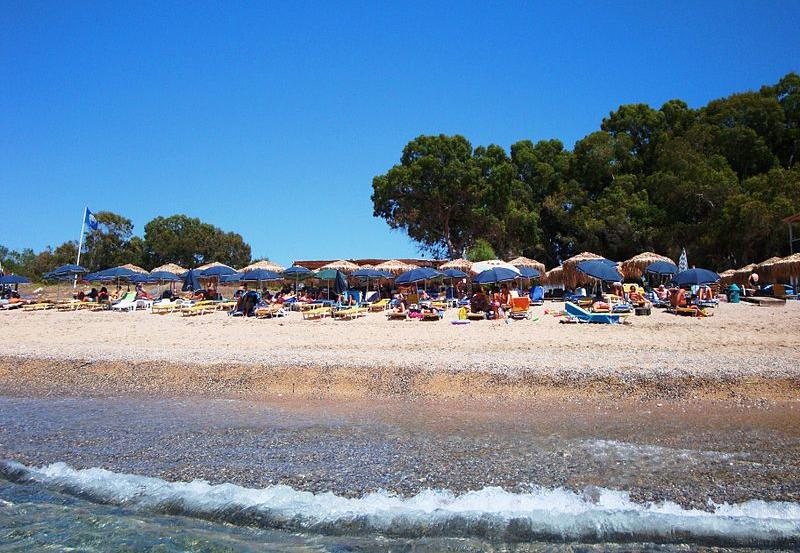
Monolithi Beach Bar in north

Monolithi is a long sandy beach, on the west coast of Preveza regional unit, Greece. The total length of the beach is 22 km. It is extended from Mytikas until Kastrosikia village

The name Monolithi comes from Greek roots "Μόνος" + "Λίθος" = "single" + "stone", after a projecting rock about ten meters high, that could be seen from the beach until it was destroyed by German and Italian soldiers with mortar fire in 1942. A photograph before 1942 is available. Today the rock exists as an undersea reef 10 cm from the surface.

== Geography ==
Monolithi beach extends in a western orientation, 22 km in length, from Komaros cape of Mytikas to the village of Kastrosykia. The width of the sandy beach in winter is about 50–10 meters, and ends in Monolithi protected forest, in Koukos hills. Along the coast of Monolithi one finds the villages Mytikas, Kanali and Kastrosykia.

== Geology ==
The coastline of the Ionian Sea has a mixed form. The main sandy beach length of Monolithi from Mytikas to Kastrosykia is 22 km. The Ionian coast are wide historical creation that starts from the middle Pleistocene (600,000 years BC). The Pleistocene period has broad course of 10,000 BC to 2,000,000 BC Geologically, the Ionian coast from Preveza to Parga show upward movements, while the east area of Amvrakikos marked slow precipitation which is substituted by the silting of the rivers Arachthos and Louros. At Agios Georgios of Lygia there are tufts of coral at a depth of 1,5m from the sea on a cohesive conglomerates. The dating of samples from the corals of Lygia, the Jotl 1999, the method U / Th, gave age around 13,000 years BC. In place Rider Kastrosykia at an altitude of 40m identified small size marine sand beaches and age was determined by the method of thermoluminescence at about 124,000 years BC.

== Map Plan and Tourism ==
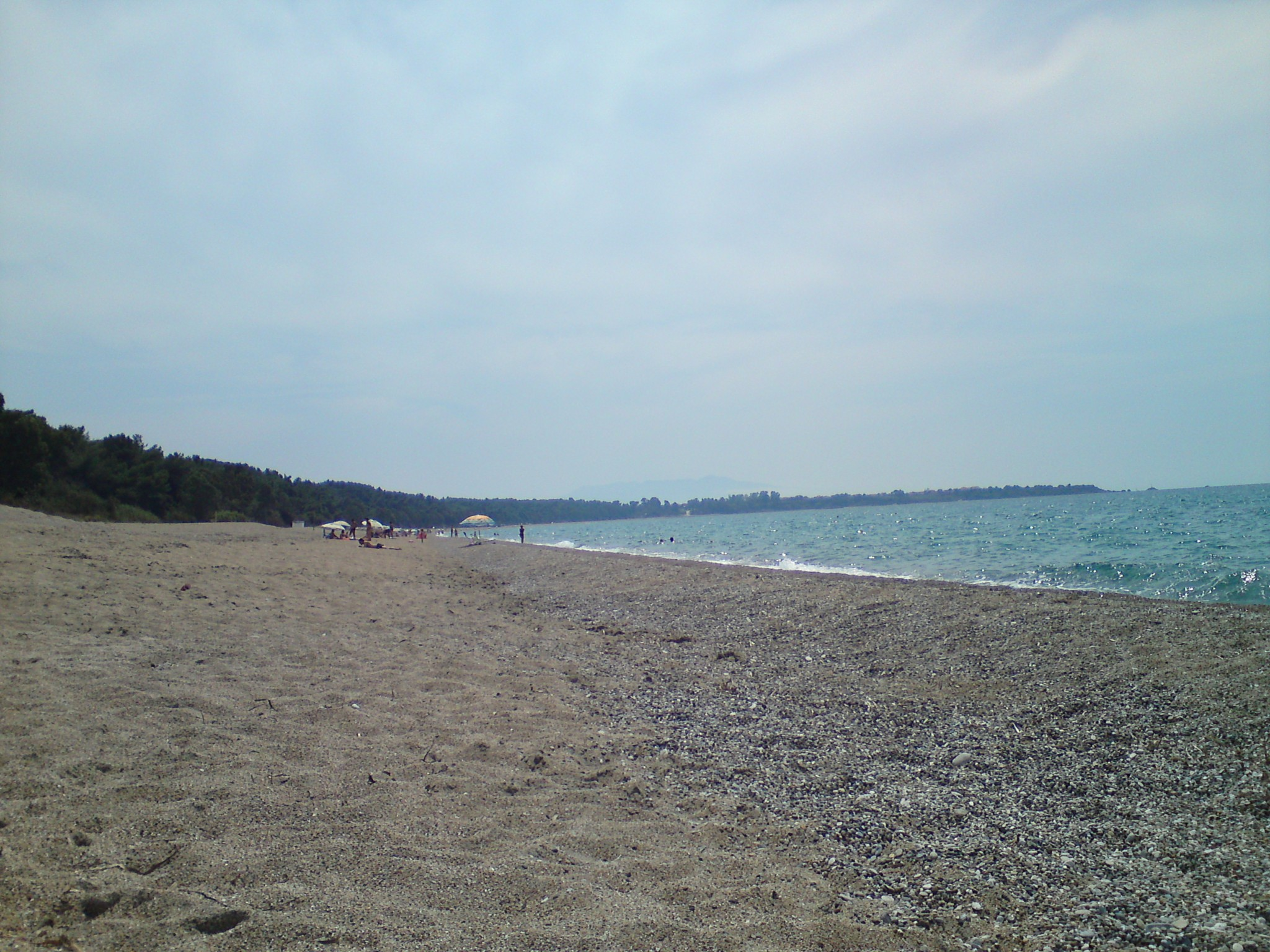
Monolithi beach amenities

Monolithi beach is an open circular arc segment with a southwest-facing slope about 10-20 degreesm starting from Komaros cape in Mytikas village in the municipality of Preveza. From there begins the so-called aesthetic Monolithi forest which is about 8 km and a width of 200m, nominated by the coastline and the National Road Preveza-Igoumenitsa. This zone is Archaeological Zone "Alpha" and no construction activity is allowed because of Ancient Nikopolis. It follows the stretch of beach in Kanali village in Preveza municipality. At the 10th kilometer of the route is the complex Nicopolis Club built by the decorator Leandros Spartiotis in 1992 as a copy of Ancient Nicopolis. Here are the beaches of Kanali Camping and Then hotels in Kanali beach(Kanali Hotel, Katerina Hotel, Theoxenia Hotel, etc.) and the newly constructed Kanali Beach. Then follow residential resort complexes and hotels Kastrosykia (E.g. Golden Beach, Poseidon Beach Hotel, Kleopatra Hotel, Ninos Grand Resort, Kassopi Hotel, Nepheli Hotel, etc.). After Kastrosykia coastline is changing form and consists of alternating bays to Parga. The total length of the coastline west of the regional unit of Preveza is 70 km and is a pristine growing tourist area.
