= Iliokali =

Iliokali Ηλιόκαλη
- Community
- Location within Greece
- Coordinates: 39°37′N 20°58′E
- Country: Greece
- Administrative region: Epirus
- Regional unit: Ioannina
- Municipality: Ioannina
- Municipal unit: Pamvotida

Area
  - Community: 3.30 km^{2} (1.27 sq mi)

Population (2021)
  - Community: 401
  - Density: 122/km^{2} (315/sq mi)
- Time zone: UTC+2 (EET)
  - Summer (DST): UTC+3 (EEST)
- Vehicle registration: ΙΝ

Iliokali (Greek: Ηλιόκαλη, before 1927: Μορκιούς - Morkious) is a village and community in the municipal unit of Pamvotida, Ioannina regional unit, Greece. It is situated at the foot of the mountain Driskos, southeast of Lake Ioannina. The A2 Egnatia Odos motorway (Thessaloniki - Ioannina - Igoumenitsa) passes northwest of the village. Iliokali is 4 km southeast of Kastritsa and 11 km southeast of Ioannina. The community covers 3.30 km^{2} (1.27 sq mi) and is built in forests with many springs. It took its present name from the nearby Iliokali Monastery. Its inhabitants are mainly engaged in agriculture (livestock) and construction. It is known for its traditionally distilled tsipouro.

== Population ==
Historical population
Year	Pop.	±%
1981	466	—
1991	464	−0.4%
2001	420	−9.5%
2011	524	+24.8%
2021	401	−23.5%

== See also ==
- List of settlements in the Ioannina regional unit
