= Palaioselli =

Palaioselli Παλαιοσέλλι (Greek) Paluseli (Aromanian)
- Community
- Location within Greece
- Coordinates: 40°2′32″N 20°53′13″E
- Country: Greece
- Administrative region: Epirus
- Regional unit: Ioannina
- Municipality: Konitsa
- Municipal unit: Konitsa
- Elevation: 1,091 m (3,579 ft)

Population (2021)
  - Community: 52
- Time zone: UTC+2 (EET)
  - Summer (DST): UTC+3 (EEST)

Palaioselli (Greek: Παλαιοσέλλι, Aromanian: Paluseli) is a settlement in Ioannina regional unit, Epirus, Greece. The village is situated in a ravine on the right bank of the Vjosa river.

== Name ==
The toponym is a compound derived from the Greek adjective palio and the Slavic loanword in the Greek Epirot dialect selio, meaning the 'garden, the farm near the house'. Selio, stemming from the Slavic word selo, is found in several Slavic languages: Bulgarian selo 'tent, dwelling, field', Serbo-Croatian selo, Slovenian selo 'homestead, dwelling, farm', and Russian selo 'village, ecclesiastical area'. As such, the linguist Kostas Oikonomou stated Max Vasmer is incorrect in rendering the placename in Slavic as Staro Selo with a translation of the first part.

== Demographics ==
Palioseli has an Aromanian population and is an Aromanian speaking village. In the early 21st century, elderly people were bilingual in the community language and Greek, whereas younger residents under 40 might have understood the community language but did not use it.

== See also ==
- List of settlements in the Ioannina regional unit
