= Manassis =

- Community

- Location within Greece
- Coordinates: 39°47′26″N 20°49′17″E
- Country: Greece
- Administrative region: Epirus
- Regional unit: Ioannina
- Municipality: Zagori
- Municipal unit: Central Zagori
- Elevation: 764 m (2,507 ft)

Population (2021)
  - Community: 26
- Time zone: UTC+2 (EET)
  - Summer (DST): UTC+3 (EEST)

Manassis (Greek: Μανασσής) is a settlement in Ioannina regional unit, Epirus, Greece. The village is located at the northwestern base of Mount Mitsikeli. The toponym stems from the Greek surname Manas(s)is. The village is inhabited by Greeks.

== See also ==
- List of settlements in the Ioannina regional unit
