= Riachovo =

- Community
- Location within Greece
- Coordinates: 39°47′55″N 20°35′31″E
- Country: Greece
- Administrative region: Epirus
- Regional unit: Ioannina
- Municipality: Pogoni
- Municipal unit: Ano Kalamas
- Elevation: 508 m (1,667 ft)

Population (2021)
  - Community: 93
- Time zone: UTC+2 (EET)
  - Summer (DST): UTC+3 (EEST)

Riachovo (Greek: Ριάχοβο) is a settlement in Ioannina regional unit, Epirus, Greece.

== Name ==
The toponym Riachovo is derived from the Slavic word orěchъ, meaning 'walnut tree' and the suffix -ovo, where the Slavic ě became ia through Greek, while the initial o- was lost due to its pronunciation alongside the Greek neuter article to.

== See also ==
- List of settlements in the Ioannina regional unit
