= Makrino =

Makrino Μακρίνο Măkrinu
- Community
- Location within Greece
- Coordinates: 39°52′N 20°57.9′E
- Country: Greece
- Administrative region: Epirus
- Regional unit: Ioannina
- Municipality: Zagori
- Municipal unit: East Zagori

Area
  - Community: 20.147 km^{2} (7.779 sq mi)
- Elevation: 980 m (3,220 ft)

Population (2021)
  - Community: 30
  - Density: 1.5/km^{2} (3.9/sq mi)
- Time zone: UTC+2 (EET)
  - Summer (DST): UTC+3 (EEST)
- Postal code: 440 14
- Area code: +30-2656
- Vehicle registration: ΙΝ

Makrino (Greek: Μακρίνο, Aromanian: Măkrinu) is a village and a community of the Zagori municipality. Before the 2011 local government reform it was part of the municipality of East Zagori, of which it was a municipal district. The 2021 census recorded 30 inhabitants in the village. The community of Makrino covers an area of 20.147 km^{2}.

== Name ==
The toponym Makrino has been rendered in several forms, such as Makryno(n), derived paretymologically from the Greek word for 'long', and Makrini, based on folk etymologies or alternate explanations devised by local scholars about the name or locality. These include an association with an icon of St. Macrina located nearby the village, the baptismal name Makrini, or the linking of local remains with the ancient city of Paroraia. Such forms differ from the local Aromanian form and pronunciation of the placename, which is Măkrin(u). The toponym is derived from the Slavic word mokrino, earlier mokrinьno, meaning 'wet place', from the Slavic word mokrь 'wet', whereby within the placename the Slavic o became a in Greek.

== Demographics ==
The population of Makrino are hellenised Aromanians. Makrino was an Aromanian speaking village and over several decades the language declined in favour of Greek. Ioannikos, the Orthodox Metropolitan of Ioannina (1815-54) and an Aromanian speaker from Makrino influenced his village to stop speaking Aromanian and use Greek in the 19th century. Makrino in the early 20th century became solely Greek speaking.

== See also ==
- List of settlements in the Ioannina regional unit
