= Dipotamo =

- Community
- Location within Greece
- Coordinates: 39°47′24″N 20°52′30″E
- Country: Greece
- Administrative region: Epirus
- Regional unit: Ioannina
- Municipality: Zagori
- Municipal unit: Central Zagori
- Elevation: 764 m (2,507 ft)

Population (2021)
  - Community: 34
- Time zone: UTC+2 (EET)
  - Summer (DST): UTC+3 (EEST)

Dipotamo (Greek: Διπόταμο, before 1928: Στόλοβον, Stolovon, between 1928 and 1929: Μέγα Ανήλιον, Mega Anilion) is a settlement in Ioannina regional unit, Epirus, Greece.

== Name ==
In the late 19th century, the scholar Ioannis Lambridis described Stolovo as referring to 'a type of table'. The toponym is derived from the Slavic stolъ, meaning 'table, seat, throne', where in a geographical context the word denotes 'a flat area resembling a table' and the suffix -ovъ.

== Demographics ==
The village is inhabited by Greeks.

== See also ==
- List of settlements in the Ioannina regional unit
