= Distrato =

Distrato Δίστρατο (Greek) Briaza (Aromanian)
- Municipal unit
- Location within the regional unit

- Location within Greece
- Coordinates: 40°01′N 21°01′E
- Country: Greece
- Administrative region: Epirus
- Regional unit: Ioannina
- Municipality: Konitsa

Area
  - Municipal unit: 53.837 km^{2} (20.787 sq mi)
- Elevation: 1,018 m (3,340 ft)

Population (2021)
  - Municipal unit: 207
  - Municipal unit density: 3.84/km^{2} (9.96/sq mi)
- Time zone: UTC+2 (EET)
  - Summer (DST): UTC+3 (EEST)
- Vehicle registration: ΙΝ

Distrato (Greek: Δίστρατο, before 1928: Βριάζα, Vriaza; Aromanian: Briaza) is a village and a former community in the Ioannina regional unit, Epirus, Greece. Since the 2011 local government reform it is part of the municipality Konitsa, of which it is a municipal unit. The municipal unit has an area of 53.837 km^{2}. Population 207 (2021). The village is situated in a ravine on the right bank of the Vjosa river.

== Name ==
The linguist Max Vasmer stated the placename Briaza stemmed from the (Slavic) Bulgarian word brěza, meaning 'birch', with the Slavic ě being rendered as ia in Greek. The linguist Yordan Zaimov wrote that beside the derivation from brěza, earlier berza, the toponym may also stem from the etymologically related Slavic adjectives brjaz (masculine) and brjaza (feminine) meaning 'white'.

The linguist Kostas Oikonomou stated the location of the village in an Aromanian-speaking area increases the likelihood the toponym is derived from the Aromanian noun vreazã, also vreaje, meaning 'dry branch', itself derived from the Bulgarian brěza 'birch'.

== History ==
Distrato was under Italian control during the Second World War and in late 1941 the Aromanians of the village opposed the local Greek school being reopened.

== Demographics ==
Distrato has an Aromanian population and is an Aromanian speaking village. In the early 21st century, elderly people were bilingual in the community language and Greek, whereas younger residents under 40 might have understood the community language but did not use it.
