= Kanali =

Kanali Κανάλι
- Community
- Location within Greece
- Coordinates: 39°04′08″N 20°41′24″E
- Country: Greece
- Administrative region: Epirus
- Regional unit: Preveza
- Municipality: Preveza
- Municipal unit: Zalongo

Population (2021)
  - Community: 1,349
- Time zone: UTC+2 (EET)
  - Summer (DST): UTC+3 (EEST)

Kanali (Greek: Κανάλι) is a seaside village and a community in the Preveza regional unit, northwestern Greece. It was the seat of the former municipality Zalongo. The community consists of the villages Kanali, Kastrosykia, Mazi, Nea Thesi and Pidima Kyras. Kanali is situated on the Ionian Sea coast, 13 km north of Preveza.

Epirus in antiquity

The village Kastrosykia, 6 km northwest of Kanali, is the location of a city of ancient Epirus, probably of a port of Cassope.
