= Agios Minas, Ioannina =

Agios Minas
- Community
- Agios Minas

- Location within Greece
- Coordinates: 39°56′52″N 20°40′13″E
- Country: Greece
- Administrative region: Epirus
- Regional unit: Ioannina
- Municipality: Zagori
- Municipal unit: Central Zagori
- Elevation: 542 m (1,778 ft)

Population (2021)
  - Community: 36
- Time zone: UTC+2 (EET)
  - Summer (DST): UTC+3 (EEST)

Agios Minas (Greek: Άγιος Μηνάς) is a settlement in Ioannina regional unit, Epirus, Greece.

== Name ==
The settlement is named after the Church of Agios Minas, known in the modern period as Megali Ekklisia 'big church', built in 1570. The village was a chiflik of Artsista (modern Aristi) and the Monastery of Panagia Spilaiotissa in the mid-18th century (1752); in 1764 Father Damianos was the abbot of Agios Minas.

== Demographics ==
The village is inhabited by Greeks.

== See also ==
- List of settlements in the Ioannina regional unit
