= Mesovouni, Ioannina =

Mesovouni
- Community
- Location within Greece
- Coordinates: 39°56′24″N 20°38′27″E
- Country: Greece
- Administrative region: Epirus
- Regional unit: Ioannina
- Municipality: Zagori
- Municipal unit: Central Zagori
- Elevation: 851 m (2,792 ft)

Population (2021)
  - Community: 35
- Time zone: UTC+2 (EET)
  - Summer (DST): UTC+3 (EEST)

Mesovouni (Greek: Μεσοβούνι) is a settlement in Ioannina regional unit, Epirus, Greece.

== Name ==
The toponym is a compound of the Greek noun meso 'middle', its adjective form mesos, and the noun vouni 'mountain', which stems from the Ancient Greek vounos. The linguist Kostas Oikonomou stated the site of the present village does not align with its name, as it is not located among mountains. Instead, the toponym was transferred from another original locality by inhabitants from an area near the wayside shrine of Saint Charalambos, a place situated among mountains.

== Demographics ==
The village is inhabited by Greeks, and some Sarakatsani who settled in the village during the early 20th century. The Sarakatsani are Greek speakers.

== See also ==
- List of settlements in the Ioannina regional unit
