= Aetomilitsa =

Village in Epirus, Greece

Aetomilitsa Αετομηλίτσα (Greek) Deniscu (Aromanian)
- Municipal unit
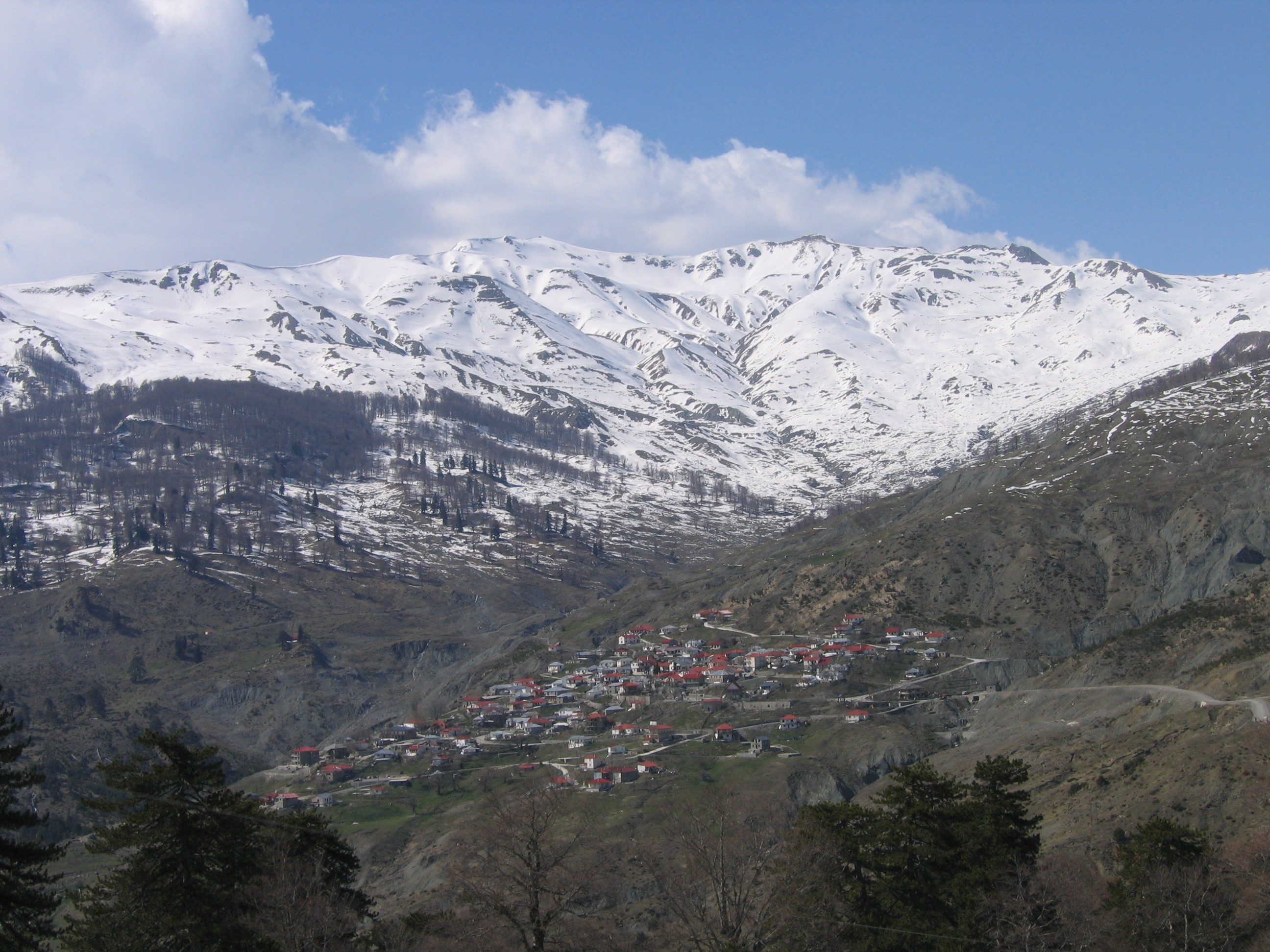
- View on Aetomilitsa village. Peaks of Gramos mountain visible in the background

- Location within the regional unit

- Location within Greece
- Coordinates: 40°18.6′N 20°51.3′E
- Country: Greece
- Administrative region: Epirus
- Regional unit: Ioannina
- Municipality: Konitsa

Area
  - Municipal unit: 51.297 km^{2} (19.806 sq mi)
- Elevation: 1,430 m (4,690 ft)

Population (2021)
  - Municipal unit: 200
  - Municipal unit density: 3.9/km^{2} (10/sq mi)
- Time zone: UTC+2 (EET)
  - Summer (DST): UTC+3 (EEST)
- Postal code: 440 15
- Area code: +30-2655
- Vehicle registration: IN

Aetomilitsa (Greek: Αετομηλίτσα, before 1927: Δέντσικον, Dentsikon, between 1927 and 1928: Γαλαταριά, Galataria; Aromanian: Deniscu) is a village in the Ioannina regional unit, Epirus, Greece. Since the 2011 local government reform it is part of the municipality Konitsa, of which it is a municipal unit. Before 2011, it was an independent community. The 2021 census recorded 200 residents in the village. The community of Aetomilitsa covers an area of 51.297 square kilometres (19.806 sq mi).

== Name ==
The linguist Max Vasmer wrote the toponym is Slavic and linked to the form Vodensko, found in several other Slavic placenames in the Balkans. The linguist Kostas Oikonomou derived the toponym from the Slavic dědina indicating an 'ancestral inheritance', 'estate', 'village'.

The first part of the placename is formed from the Slavic word dědъ meaning 'grandfather', and the ending -ina, alongside the adjectival suffix ьskъ, feminine ьska, with the modified noun being omitted. From the form Dědinьskъ the toponym was formed by the sound cluster sk becoming ck, producing Dědinьcko. This was followed by the rendering of the Slavic ě with e in Greek and elimination of the unstressed i and ь resulting in Dedncko; whereby the dissimilation of d-d into d-ø in Greek resulted in the final form.

== Geography ==
The village lies on the Gramos mountain. It is one of the highest communities in Greece situated at an altitude of 1,430 metres (4,690 ft). A glacial lake, Moutsalia Lake (Greek: Λίμνη Μουτσάλια) is situated 5 km as the crow flies or 13 km drive on a dirt road from Aetomilitsa.

== Climate ==
Aetomilitsa has a warm-summer humid continental climate (Köppen climate classification: Dfb) using the 0 °C (32 °F) isotherm, or a temperate oceanic climate (Köppen climate classification: Cfb) using the −3 °C (27 °F) isotherm for the coldest month. Aetomilitsa experiences cold winters with high precipitation and warm, drier summers.

Climate data for Aetomilitsa
Month	Jan	Feb	Mar	Apr	May	Jun	Jul	Aug	Sep	Oct	Nov	Dec	Year
Mean daily maximum °C (°F)	1.35 (34.43)	4.05 (39.29)	8.25 (46.85)	11.39 (52.50)	16.83 (62.29)	20.88 (69.58)	26.52 (79.74)	25.39 (77.70)	21.93 (71.47)	14.78 (58.60)	7.53 (45.55)	3.41 (38.14)	13.53 (56.35)
Daily mean °C (°F)	−1.65 (29.03)	0.02 (32.04)	3.11 (37.60)	7.42 (45.36)	12.30 (54.14)	16.16 (61.09)	20.39 (68.70)	20.76 (69.37)	15.45 (59.81)	8.68 (47.62)	3.53 (38.35)	−0.2 (31.6)	8.83 (47.89)
Mean daily minimum °C (°F)	−5.30 (22.46)	−3.32 (26.02)	−1.19 (29.86)	2.27 (36.09)	5.86 (42.55)	9.42 (48.96)	12.40 (54.32)	12.10 (53.78)	7.67 (45.81)	4.39 (39.90)	−0.86 (30.45)	−4.04 (24.73)	3.28 (37.91)
Average precipitation mm (inches)	144.84 (5.70)	144.48 (5.69)	115.25 (4.54)	105.99 (4.17)	111.82 (4.40)	66.35 (2.61)	51.45 (2.03)	58.93 (2.32)	54.78 (2.16)	103.68 (4.08)	155.22 (6.11)	172.09 (6.78)	1,284.88 (50.59)
Mean monthly sunshine hours	119.09	125.85	154.85	162.02	205.07	275.09	295.31	270.15	200.00	167.03	113.25	85.92	2,173.63
Source: Hellenic National Meteorological Service

== History ==
For a time during the Greek Civil War (1946-1949), Aetomilitsa was the seat of the communist rebels, the so-called "Provisional Democratic Government".

== Demographics ==
Aetomilitsa has an Aromanian population and is an Aromanian speaking village. In the early 21st century, elderly people were bilingual in the community language and Greek, whereas younger residents under 40 might have understood the community language but did not use it.
