= Fourka =

Fourka Φούρκα (Greek) Furkă (Aromanian)
- Municipal unit
- Location within the regional unit

- Location within Greece
- Coordinates: 40°10′N 20°57′E
- Country: Greece
- Administrative region: Epirus
- Regional unit: Ioannina
- Municipality: Konitsa

Area
  - Municipal unit: 32.374 km^{2} (12.500 sq mi)
- Elevation: 1,360 m (4,460 ft)

Population (2021)
  - Municipal unit: 56
  - Municipal unit density: 1.7/km^{2} (4.5/sq mi)
- Time zone: UTC+2 (EET)
  - Summer (DST): UTC+3 (EEST)
- Postal code: 440 08
- Vehicle registration: ΙΝ
- Website: www.fourka.gr

Fourka (Greek: Φούρκα; Aromanian: Furkă) is a village and a former community in the Ioannina regional unit, Epirus, Greece. Since the 2011 local government reform it is part of the municipality Konitsa, of which it is a municipal unit. The municipal unit has an area of 32.374 km^{2}. Population 56 (2021).

== Name ==
The toponym is derived either from the Aromanian furca meaning 'the fork, or distaff' or from a Latin loan rendered as fourka in common modern Greek, stemming from the medieval Greek fourka and originating from Latin furca. The word also exists in Romanian as furca and Albanian as furk/ë with the same meaning.

The linguist Kostas Oikonomou wrote the name relates to the geography of the land, as the village, according to local tradition, was located at Paluhoară, a place resembling a fourka and formed by two pits called Visani and Louri. Local tradition attributes the name to forks placed alongside the road leading into the village, so people would not get lost in fog, snow, or stormy weather.

== Demography ==
Fourka has an Aromanian population and is an Aromanian speaking village. In the early 21st century, elderly people were bilingual in the community language and Greek, whereas younger residents under 40 might have understood the community language but did not use it. Aromanian multipart singing (polyphony) is practised in the village.
