= Lippa, Ioannina =

Lippa Λίππα
- Community
- Location within Greece
- Coordinates: 39°28′N 20°45′E
- Country: Greece
- Administrative region: Epirus
- Regional unit: Ioannina
- Municipality: Dodoni
- Municipal unit: Selloi

Population (2021)
  - Community: 63
- Time zone: UTC+2 (EET)
  - Summer (DST): UTC+3 (EEST)

Lippa (Greek: Λίππα) is a community in the Ioannina regional unit of Greece. As of the 2021 census, the population of Lippa is 63. Lippa is located 50 km from Ioannina and is part of the Selloi municipal unit.
