= Moravë =

Moravë Murava
- Village
- Location within Albania
- Coordinates: 40.7606°N 19.9055°E
- Country: Albania
- County: Berat
- Municipality: Berat
- Administrative unit: Otllak
- Time zone: UTC+1 (CET)
  - Summer (DST): UTC+2 (CEST)

Moravë (Aromanian: Murava) is a village in the former municipality of Otllak in Berat County, Albania. At the 2015 local government reform it became part of the municipality Berat.
