= Greveniti =

Greveniti Γρεβενίτι (Greek) Grebenitsli, Gribinitsli (Aromanian)
- Community
- Location within Greece
- Coordinates: 39°48.3′N 21°0.2′E
- Country: Greece
- Administrative region: Epirus
- Regional unit: Ioannina
- Municipality: Zagori
- Municipal unit: East Zagori

Area
  - Community: 37.077 km^{2} (14.316 sq mi)
- Elevation: 980 m (3,220 ft)

Population (2021)
  - Community: 109
  - Density: 2.94/km^{2} (7.61/sq mi)
- Time zone: UTC+2 (EET)
  - Summer (DST): UTC+3 (EEST)
- Postal code: 440 14
- Area code: +30-2656
- Vehicle registration: ΙΝ

Greveniti (Greek: Γρεβενίτι, Aromanian: Grebenitsli, Gribinitsli) is a village and a community of the Zagori municipality in Ioannina Regional Unit, Greece. Before the 2011 local government reform it was part of the municipality of East Zagori, of which it was a municipal district. The 2021 census recorded 109 inhabitants in the village. The community of Greveniti covers an area of 37.077 km^{2}. The community consists of the villages Greveniti and Ampelos. The village of Greveniti is located in the eastern part of the Zagori region, close to a hill named Toufa.

== Name ==
The linguist Kostas Oikonomou wrote that the toponym with the suffix -itis has two derivations. The first, Grevenitis, stems from the placename Grevena, originating from greveno, 'rock', and derived from the Slavic grebenъ, 'ridge', 'rock'. Oikonomou stated this interpretation aligns with the Aromanian name of the village, Grebenitsli, and the tradition where the village was settled by inhabitants of the Grevena region. The second derivation is from greveno, as in the above etymology, and the suffix -itis, where grevenitis means 'place with many rocks'.

== Demographics ==
Greveniti has an Aromanian population and is an Aromanian speaking village. In the early 21st century, elderly people were bilingual in the community language and Greek, whereas younger residents under 40 might have understood the community language but did not use it.

== See also ==
- List of settlements in the Ioannina regional unit
