= Max Vasmer =

Russian-German linguist (1886–1962)

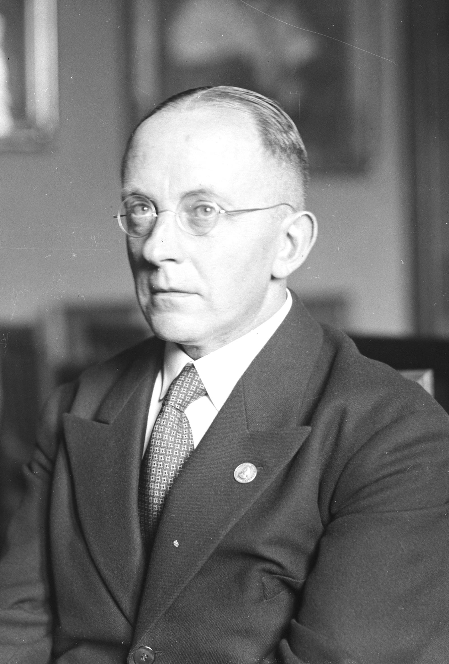
- Vasmer in 1934
- Born: 28 February 1886; Saint Petersburg, Russia
- Died: 30 November 1962 (aged 76); West Berlin, West Germany
- Citizenship: Russia; West Germany
- Occupations: Scholar of Slavic languages (Slavistics); philologist; lexicographer; etymologist

Max Julius Friedrich Vasmer (German: [ˈfasmɐ], Russian: ['fasmʲer]; Russian: Максимилиан Романович Фасмер, romanized: Maksimilian Romanovich Fasmer; 28 February 1886 – 30 November 1962) was a Russian and German linguist. He studied problems of etymology in Indo-European, Finno-Ugric and Turkic languages and worked on the history of Slavic, Baltic, Iranian, and Finno-Ugric peoples.

== Biography ==
Max Vasmer was born on 28 February 1886 to German parents in Saint Petersburg. Vasmer graduated from Saint Petersburg University in 1907 as a student of Jan Baudouin de Courtenay and Aleksey Shakhmatov. From 1907 to 1908, he studied Greek dialects and the Albanian language in Greece. He continued to study at the universities of Krakow and Vienna from 1908 to 1910.

From 1910, he delivered lectures and taught at the Bestuzhev Courses in 1912. During the Russian Civil War of 1917–1922, he worked in the universities of Saratov (1917–1918) and Dorpat (1918–1921). From 1921 to 1925, he taught at the University of Leipzig, and from 1925 to 1945, he taught at the University of Berlin. He also founded the journal Zeitschrift für slavische Philologie.

In 1938–1939, he delivered lectures at Columbia University in New York City. It was there that he started to work on his magnum opus, the Etymological Dictionary of the Russian Language. He delivered the eulogy for Professor Aleksander Brückner in Berlin-Wilmersdorf in 1939 and he took over the chair of Slavistic studies at the University of Berlin. In 1941, he published the book "The Slavs in Greece" (Die Slaven in Griechenland) and in 1944 the book "The Greek loanwords in Serbo-Croatian" (Die griechischen Lehnwörter im Serbo-Kroatischen).

In 1944, the bombing of Vasmer's house in Berlin destroyed most of his materials. Nevertheless, Vasmer persevered in his work, which was finally published in three volumes by Heidelberg University in 1950–1958 as Russisches Etymologisches Wörterbuch. From 1947 to 1949, he taught at the Stockholm University. He was the head of Slavic studies at the Free University of West Berlin. Vasmer died in West Berlin on 30 November 1962.

The Russian translation of Vasmer's dictionary – with extensive commentaries by Oleg Trubachyov – was printed in 1964–1973. As of 2015, it remains the most authoritative source for Slavic etymology. The Russian version is available on Sergei Starostin's Tower of Babel web site.

Another monumental work led by Max Vasmer involved the compilation of a multi-volume dictionary of Russian names of rivers and other bodies of water. He initiated an even grander project, completed by a team of workers after his death: the publication of a monumental (11 volumes) gazetteer that included virtually all names of populated places in Russia found both in pre-revolutionary and in Soviet sources.

== See also ==
- Etymological dictionary

== Sources ==
- Kurkina, L. V. (2017). "Фасмер". In Kravets, S. L. (ed.). Большая российская энциклопедия. Том 33: Уланд — Хватцев (in Russian). Большая российская энциклопедия. p. 207. ISBN 978-5-85270-370-5. Archived from the original on 29 April 2026.
