= Aromanians in Greece =

Ethnic Aromanian minority within Greece

Aromanians in Greece Armãnji/Rrãmãnji tu Gãrtsii Βλάχοι/Αρμάνοι στην Ελλάδα
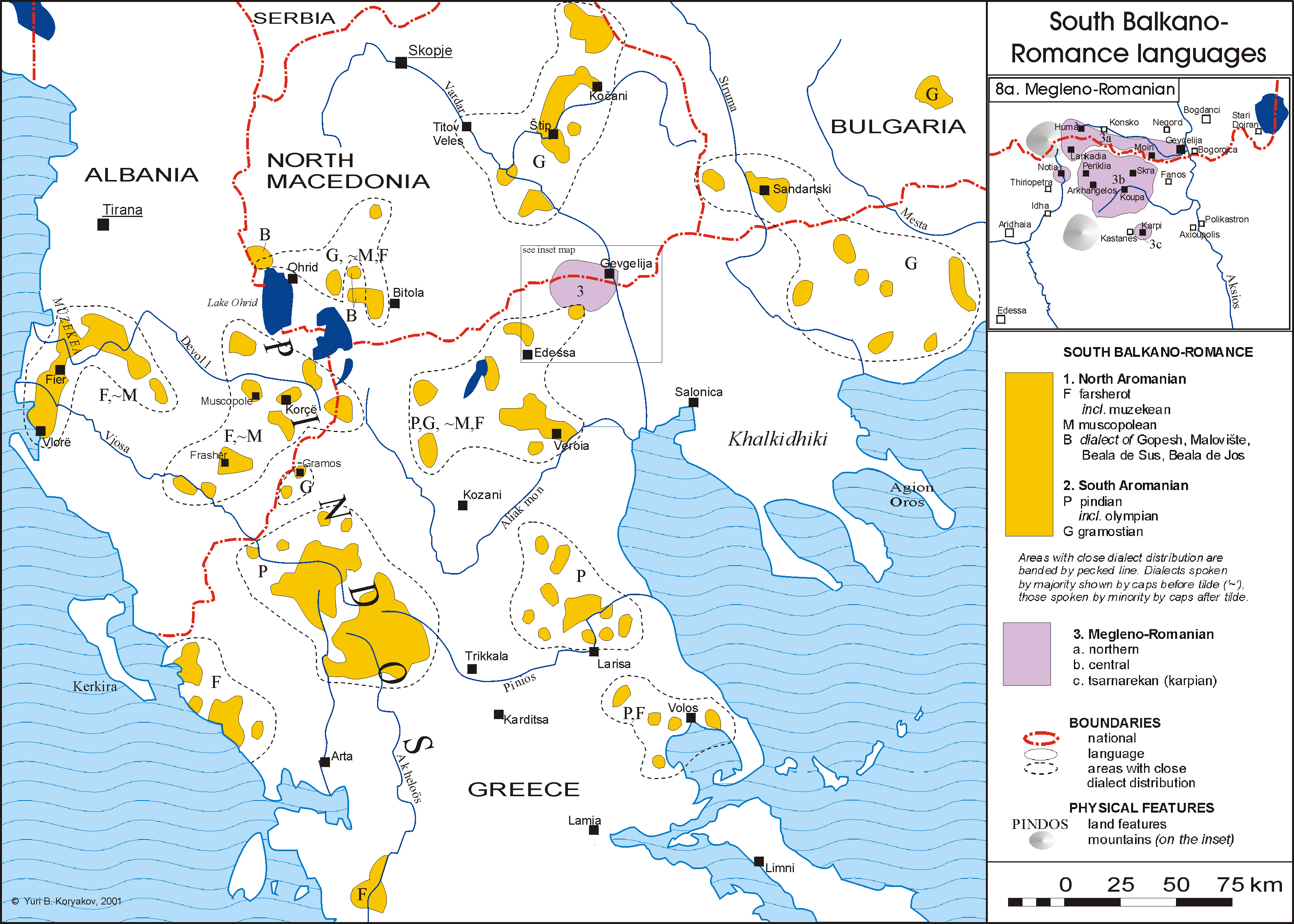
- Area with Aromanian population and dialects

Total population
- 39,855 (1951 census); unofficial estimates count up to 300,000

Regions with significant populations
- Attica, Epirus, Thessaly, Western Macedonia, Central Macedonia

Languages
- Aromanian (native), Greek

Religion
- Predominantly Eastern Orthodoxy

Related ethnic groups
- Aromanians

The Aromanians in Greece (Aromanian: Armãnji tu Gãrtsii; Greek: Βλάχοι/Αρμάνοι στην Ελλάδα) are a non-recognized ethnic minority in Epirus, Aetolia-Acarnania, Thessaly and Western and Central Macedonia, in Greece.

In the country, the Aromanians are commonly known as "Vlachs" (Βλάχοι, Vláchoi) and referred to as "Vlachophone Greeks" or "Vlach-speaking Greeks", because most Aromanians in Greece have a Greek identity and identify themselves with the Greek nation and culture.

== History ==
Byzantine historian George Kedrenos identified Aromanians living in what is now Greece in the 11th century. Under the Ottoman Empire, the Aromanians were considered part of the Rum Millet. In 1902, Romanian politician Alexandru Lahovary advocated for the recognition of the Aromanians as a distinct millet, which was granted in 1905. The group became more distinct towards the end of the 19th century, with a split occurring between Vlachs who identified more closely with Romania and those who were linked more to Greece.

== Demographics ==
In the 1990s, the European Commission's Euromosaic Project documenting minority languages recorded the geographic distribution and language status of Aromanians and Aromanian in Greece.

Distribution of Aromanian speakers in Greece (Euromosaic)
Administrative divisions	Geographic location and language status (late 20th century)
Drama	5 villages; Aromanian is spoken within a limited area in the city of Drama.
Serres	15 villages; Aromanian is spoken in the city of Serres.
Kilkis	Aromanian is spoken in 2 villages and in the city of Kilkis.
Thessaloniki	3 villages and in the city of Thessaloniki. Aromanians migrated to the city for several centuries and became Hellenised over time. In the early 20th century, Aromanian was spoken in some neighbourhoods of Thessaloniki. Modern Aromanian speakers in Thessaloniki are descendants of recent migrations.
Pella	Aromanian is spoken in 4 villages and in the cities of Giannitsa and Edessa.
Kastoria	5 villages and in the town of Argos Orestiko and city of Kastoria.
Florina	11–13 villages.
Kozani	4 villages and in the town of Servia and city of Kozani.
Grevena	9 villages and in the city of Grevena.
Pieria	7–8 villages and in the city of Katerini.
Imathia	Over 7 villages and in the cities of Veria (widespread use) and Alexandreia.
Ioannina	38 villages, including the village of Metsovo and in the city of Ioannina.
Preveza	4 villages and in the city of Preveza.
Thesprotia	7 villages and in the city of Igoumenitsa and town of Paramithia.
Arta	3 villages and in the city of Arta.
Larissa	26 villages and in the cities of Tyrnavos and Larissa.
Trikala	43 villages in the west of the prefecture, 3 villages in the east, and in a larger area in the town of Kalambaka and city of Trikala.
Karditsa	1–2 villages and in a limited area in the city of Karditsa.
Magnesia	6 villages and 2 neighbourhoods in the city of Volos.
Aetolia-Acarnania	10–11 villages and in the cities of Agrinio and Missolonghi.
Phthiotis	2–3 villages, and small traces of a presence in the city of Lamia.
Boeotia	1 village.
Athens (city)	Spoken in the city.

== Culture ==
The Aromanians of Greece count with the Panhellenic Federation of Cultural Associations of Vlachs, a cultural organization of Aromanians. The Aromanian communities, who use the endonym Vlasi, in Macedonia speak Megleno-Romanian, separate from the Aromanian language.

=== Cuisine ===
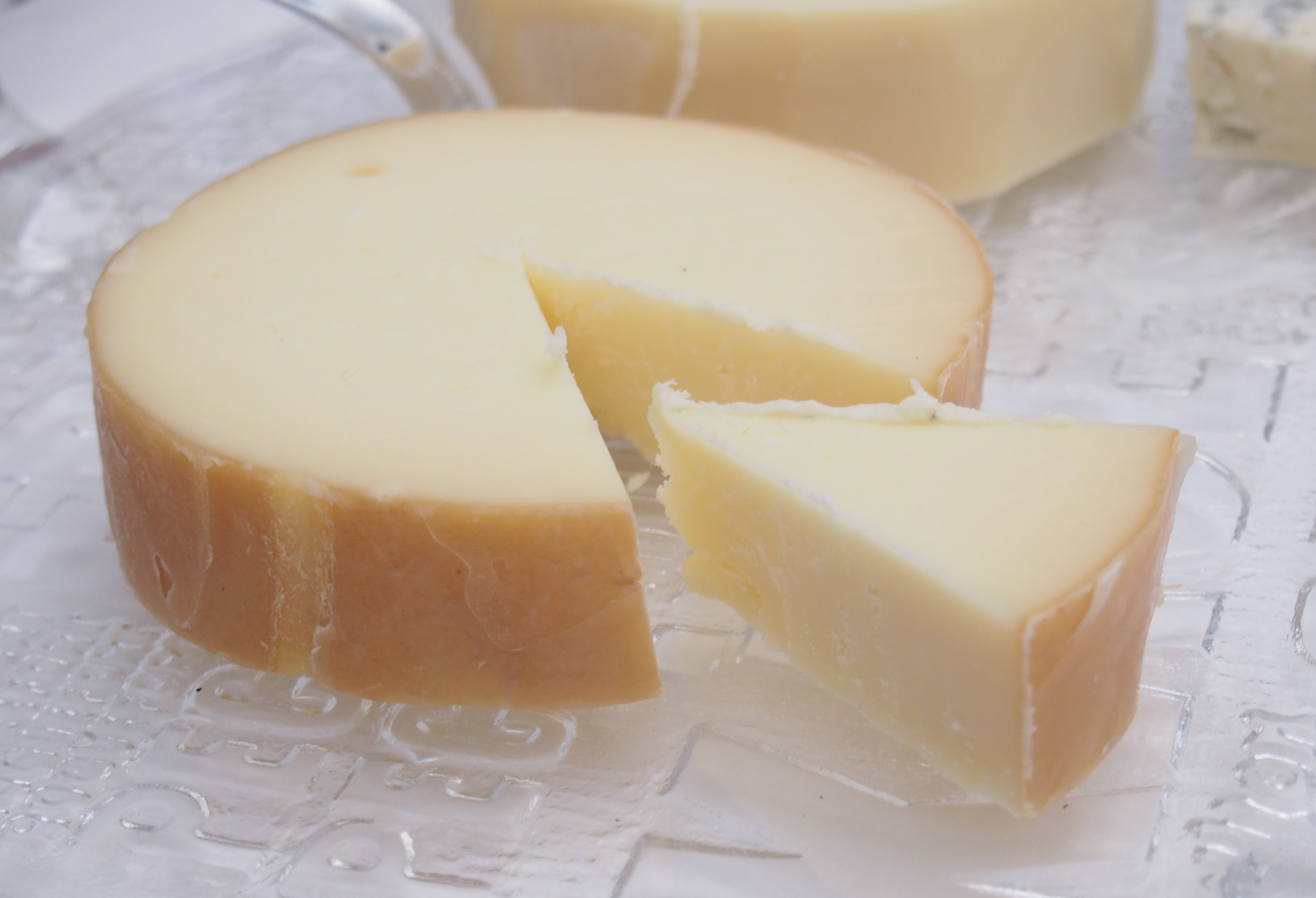
Metsovone, Aromanian cheese from Metsovo

=== Religion ===
In the Ottoman Empire, the Vlachs fell under the religious jurisdiction of the Greek Patriarch by virtue of them being Orthodox Christian; services were conducted in Greek. Conducting services in the Aromanian language became a priority issue for the Vlachs. The Orthodox Patriarch decided that if the Vlachs were to conduct services in their own language, they would be denied their own clerical head. In 1875, the Patriarch ordered the closure of 8 Vlach churches, leading to an escalation in hostilities. The Ottoman Ministry of Justice and Religious Denomination determined in 1891 that the Vlach had a right to worship in their own language; in 1892, the Ministry of Justice warned the Greek Patriarch that if Vlach-language services were not instituted, the Vlachs would likely established their own church. The Vlach were eventually successful in appointing their own bishop.

== List of settlements ==
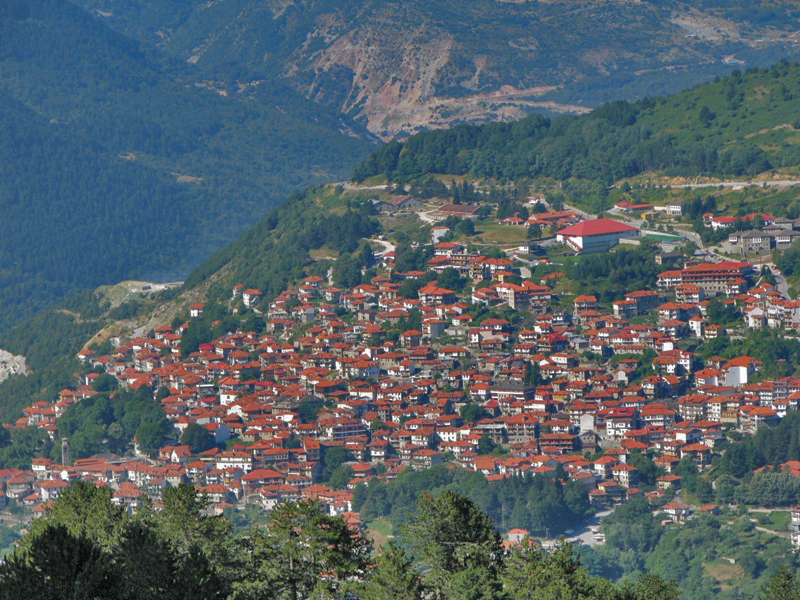
Panorama of the town of Metsovo

Because of the Aromanian history of cattle-rearing and history of discrimination in urban areas, the Aromanian population is largely scattered throughout Greece.

Epirus

- Ioannina (Ianina, Enina or Enãna)
- Delvinaki
- Kefalovryso (Migidei, Migidea)
- Igoumenitsa
- Paramythia (Pãrmãthia, Pãrmãthii)
- Filiates
- Arta
- Vovousa (Baiesa, Baiasa)
- Smenos
- Asproklisi
- Anilio (Nkiare, Chiarã)
- Armata
- Avdella (Avdhella)
- Distrato (Briaza)
- Doliani
- Elatochori
- Elefthero
- Flampourari
- Fourka (Furka)
- Fteri
- Grevena (Grebini)
- Greveniti (Grebinishi)
- Iliochori (Dobrinovo)
- Kalarites
- Tzoumerkon
- Kaminia
- Kastaniani
- Kipourio
- Konitsa (Conita)
- Kranea (Turia)
- Laista (Laka)
- Makrino
- Matsouki
- Megali Kerasia
- Metsovo (Aminciu)
- Milea (Ameru)
- Mouria
- Nea Zoi (Burshan)
- Orthovouni
- Palaioselli
- Panagia
- Parakalamos
- Pefki
- Perivoli (Pirivoli)
- Pertouli
- Pirra
- Samarina (Samarina, Xamarina, San Marina)
- Skamneli
- Smixi (Zmixi)
- Syrrako (Siracu)
- Tsepelovo
- Tristeno
- Trygona
- Vasiliko
- Vissani
- Votonossi
- Vovousa (Baieasa)
- Vrysochori (Leshnitsa)
- Aetomilitsa (Densko, Denicko)
- Argos Orestiko (Hrupistea)
- Dendrohori
- Fousia (Fusa)
- Grammos (Gramosta)
- Ieropigi
- Kleisoura (Klisura, Vlahokleisura)
- Linotopion (Linatopia, Lintopia, Linotopea, Linutopia)
- Milohorion
- Veterniko
- Vlasti (Blatsa)

=== Macedonia ===
- Agios Germanos
- Drosopigi (Belkamen)
- Flampouro
- Kallithea
- Krystallopigi (Belkamen)
- Medovon
- Milohorion
- Moschochori
- Lechovo
- Nymfeo (Nevesca)
- Patima (Paticina)
- Pili
- Vlasti (Blatsa)
- Vrontero
- Thessaloniki (Sãruna, Sãrunã)
- Kozani (Cojani)
- Kavala
- Ano Poroia (Foroi)
- Irakleia (Giumala de Jos)
- Agios Pavlos
- Ano Grammatiko (Grãmãticuva)
- Ano Vermio (Selia de Sus)
- Kato Vermio (Selia de Jos)
- Kedrona (Candruva)
- Naousa (Niagushti)
- Polla Nera
- Seli (Selia)
- Stenimachos (Isashcovedo)
- Veria (Veryia)
- Megala Livadia (Livadzi, Calive)
- Xirolivado (Xiralivadi)

=== Thessaly and Mount Olympus ===
- Larissa regional unit
- Farsala
- Trikala (Trikolj)
- Kalabaka
- Volos (Volu)
- Almyros (Armiro)
- Anthotopos (Kililaiu)
- Makrychori
- Mikri Perivoli (Taktalasman)
- Neriada (Kerminli)
- Parapotamos
- Sesklo (Sheshklu)
- Tyrnavos
- Velestino (Velescir)
- Vlachogiano
- Argyropouli (Karajoli, Caragioli)
- Falana
- Karitsa
- Kokkinopilos
- Leivadi
- Rodia
- Agia Paraskevi
- Amarantos
- Ampelochori
- Anthousa
- Chrysomilea
- Dessi
- Gardiki
- Glykomilea
- Haliki
- Kastania
- Katafyto
- Klino
- Korydallos
- Malakasi
- Vlachava

Aetolia-Acarnania

- Agrinio (Vrachori)
- Gouriotissa (Catsaru)
- Stratos, Greece (Sorovigli)
- Xiromero
- Manina Vlizianon (Calendzi)
- Agrampela, Aetolia-Acarnania (Dajianda)
- Palaiomanina (Cutsobina)
- Strongylovouni (Sturnari)
- Ochthia (Ochtu)

== Notable Aromanians from modern Greece ==
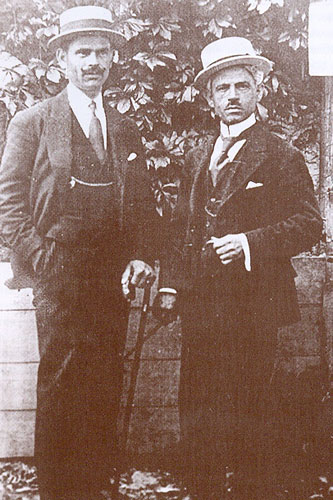
Yanaki and Milton Manaki

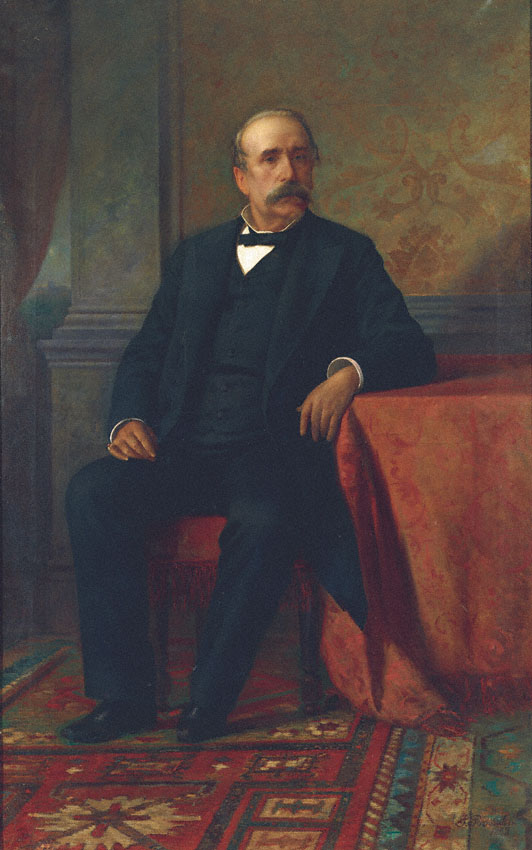
George Averoff, oil painting by Pavlos Prosalentis the younger (1857–1894)

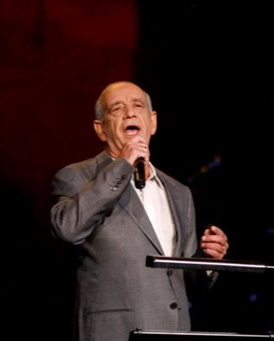
Dimitris Mitropanos

=== Academics ===
- Nikos Katsanis, scholar
- Zoe Papazisi Papatheodorou (b. 1950), folklorist
- Anastasios Pichion (1836–1913), educator, fighter in the Greek Struggle for Macedonia

=== Art and literature ===
- Yanaki Manaki (1878–1954), photography and cinema pioneer
- Milton Manaki (1882–1964), photography and cinema pioneer
- Aristotelis Valaoritis (1824–1879), poet and politician
- Vassilis Tsitsanis (1915–1984), musician
- Dimitris Mitropanos (1948–2012), musician
- Takis Mousafiris (1936–2021), musician
- Zicu Araia (1877–1948), poet, schoolteacher and separatist leader
- George Ceara (1880/81–1939), poet, prose writer and schoolteacher
- Ion Foti (1887–1946), poet, prose writer, journalist, and translator
- Nuși Tulliu (1872–1941), poet and prose writer
- Toma Caragiu (1925–1977), actor
- Apostolos Kaldaras (1922–1990), composer

=== Military ===
- Konda Bimbaša (1770–1813), revolutionary
- Giorgakis Olympios (1772–1821), armatolos and military commander during the Greek War of Independence
- Mitre the Vlach (1873–1907), IMRO commander
- Georgios Modis (1887–1975), jurist, politician, writer and Macedonian Struggle fighter
- Cola Nicea (b. 1886), armatole
- Stefanos Sarafis (1890–1957), Greek military and Resistance leader.

=== Philanthropy and commerce ===
- Georgios Sinas (1783–1856), businessman
- Simon Sinas (1810–1876), businessman
- George Averoff (1818–1899), businessman and philanthropist
- Sotirios Voulgaris (1857–1932), silversmith and distinguished businessman
- Michael Tositsas (1787–1856), benefactor
- Petar Ičko (1755–1808), merchant, Ottoman and later Serbian diplomat, born in Pyrgoi; possibly Aromanian.
- Lazaros Tsamis (1878–1933), merchant

=== Politics ===
- Rigas Feraios (1757–1798), writer, political thinker and revolutionary (possible Aromanian origin)
- Ioannis Kolettis (1773–1847, Prime Minister of Greece
- Petros Zappas, member of the Greek Parliament (1915–1917) for the Argyrokastron Prefecture
- Alexandros Papagos (1883–1955), Hellenic Army officer and Prime Minister
- Alcibiades Diamandi (1893–1948), leader of Principality of the Pindus and later of the Roman Legion
- Nicolaos Matussis (1899–1991), lawyer, politician and leader of the Roman Legion
- Vassilis Rapotikas (1888–1943), commander of the Roman Legion
- Evangelos Averoff (1910–1990), Greek minister and leader of the New Democracy party
- Michael Dukakis (b. 1933), American Governor of Massachusetts, former member of the Massachusetts House of Representatives (Massachusetts State Legislature), and former presidential candidate
- Andreas Tzimas, communist politician
- Alexandros Svolos, jurist and president of the Political Committee of National Liberation (unofficial Prime Minister)
- Yannis Boutaris (1942–2024), businessman, politician and mayor of Thessaloniki
- Dimitrios Makris (1910–1981), politician and minister

=== Religion ===
- Theodore Kavalliotis (1718–1789), priest and teacher
- Archimandrite Averchie (b. 1806 or 1818), monk and schoolteacher
- Meletie Covaci (1707–1775), Catholic bishop
- Hierotheus I of Alexandria (1825–1845), Greek Orthodox Patriarch of Alexandria

=== Science ===
- Elie Carafoli (1901–1983), engineer and aircraft designer

== See also ==
- Aromanians in Albania
- Aromanians in Bulgaria
- Aromanians in North Macedonia
- Aromanians in Romania
- Aromanians in Serbia
- Great Vlachia
- Little Vlachia
- Aromanian question
