= East Zagori =

East Zagori Ανατολικό Ζαγόρι
- Municipal unit
- Location within the regional unit

- Location within Greece
- Coordinates: 39°44′N 20°58′E
- Country: Greece
- Administrative region: Epirus
- Regional unit: Ioannina
- Municipality: Zagori

Area
  - Municipal unit: 269.657 km^{2} (104.115 sq mi)

Population (2021)
  - Municipal unit: 1,113
  - Municipal unit density: 4.127/km^{2} (10.69/sq mi)
- Time zone: UTC+2 (EET)
  - Summer (DST): UTC+3 (EEST)
- Vehicle registration: ΙΝ

East Zagori (Greek: Ανατολικό Ζαγόρι) is a former municipality in the Ioannina regional unit, Epirus, Greece. Since the 2011 local government reform it is part of the municipality Zagori, of which it is a municipal unit. The municipal unit has an area of 269.657 km^{2}. Population 1,113 (2021). The seat of the municipality was in Miliotades.
