= Parakalamos, Ioannina =

Parakalamos
- Community
- Location within Greece
- Coordinates: 39°51′48″N 20°33′53″E
- Country: Greece
- Administrative region: Epirus
- Regional unit: Ioannina
- Municipality: Pogoni
- Municipal unit: Ano Kalamas
- Elevation: 508 m (1,667 ft)

Population (2021)
  - Community: 654
- Time zone: UTC+2 (EET)
  - Summer (DST): UTC+3 (EEST)

Parakalamos (Greek: Παρακάλαμος, before 1927: Πογδόριανη, Pogdoriani) is a settlement in Ioannina regional unit, Epirus, Greece. The village of Parakalamos is located on the right side of the Gormos river, a tributary of the Kalamas river. The community consists of the villages Parakalamos, Ano Parakalamos, Moschomantsa, Bolaika and Stavrodromion.

== Name ==
The village of Pogdoriani (modern Ano Parakalamos) owned fields at a site named Kalyvia 'huts' where the village Parakalamos later formed. The placename Pogdoriani is derived from the Slavic podъgorjane, meaning 'people at the foot of the mountain' and combines podъ 'below' and gora 'mountain, forest', with the suffix -jane denoting inhabitants, and a transposition of the d and g sounds.

Slavic placenames were replaced with Greek names by the state. During the interwar period, Parakalamos was a sub–settlement of Pogdoriani. Once the new name Parakalamos was adopted for the Kalyvia site, the original location of Pogdoriani was renamed Ano (Upper) Parakalamos. Among locals of the interwar period, the name Kalivioi Pogdoriani was used until 1927 and later Kalivioi Parakalamou. The new placename Parakalamos was a modern bureaucratic creation, a compound formation with the Greek prefix para 'beside'. The inclusion of the toponym Kalamas would have yielded the form Parakalamas; however, linguist Kostas Oikonomou states the second part of the name is derived from the word kalami 'reed' or kalamos 'stalk, cane', possibly from a forgotten old placename.

== History ==
The inhabitants of Pogdoriani, a village located at the base of Paleogribiani hill, owned shacks at site called Kalyvia on the fertile plain of Gormos to work their fields and graze animals. The distance between both locations was 5 km and villagers wanted to avoid the long trek. The movement to the plain by the population began toward the end of Ottoman rule in 1913, when the village was razed by the Ottoman army. The settlement was moved to the location after people from Pogdoriani built houses. By the 1928 Greek census, the new locality was recorded as a sub–settlement of Pogdoriani. Following the Second World war, Parakalomos became an agricultural town and an important shopping location, replacing Doliana as a regional centre. Every May, villagers from both Ano Parakalamos and Parakalamos gather at Ano Parakalamos for a panighyri (religious festival) celebrating St. John the Apostle.

== Demographics ==
Parakalamos is populated by Greeks, Aromanians, Roma and Albanians. The Greeks form the majority of inhabitants in the village, mainly arriving to the area on the plain in the early 20th century from the upper villages. Greek multipart singing (polyphony) is practised in the village. Some of the population are Aromanians, previously they were transhumant pastoralists and later settled in Parakalamos. Many of the non–Romani population are engaged in agriculture and own fields on the plain. Apart from the Roma, all other inhabitants are monolingual Greek speakers. In the early 21st century, some 1,000 inhabitants lived in the village; among them were twenty Roma families, forming ten percent of the population. Many Roma from Parakalamos have resettled in the neighbourhood of Nea Zoi in Ioannina where they work as musicians and some others have migrated to Athens and abroad to the United States.

The Roma of Parakalamos refer to themselves as Romacel and are Romani speakers, calling their language Romacilikanes, while they also speak Greek. Parakalamos has attained a reputation as the 'music village' or 'Gypsy village'. Following the end of Ottoman rule and the Balkan wars, Romani inhabitants who were Muslim and had Turkish names all left Pogoniani and Chrysodouli and settled in Parakalamos and Sitaria. Later, all the Roma settled in Parakalamos between 1915 and 1925. The males worked as musicians and women as fortune tellers, while their residence in Parakalamos was seasonal, mainly during the winter renting homes from the locals. After the end of World War Two, the Roma were converted to Orthodox Christianity by the village priest in 1945 and began using Christian names. The Roma of Parakalamos converted to Orthodoxy to avoid the same fate other Roma suffered under the Germans during the war.

During 1945–1962, the Roma built houses in Parakalamos and gave up their nomadic lifestyle, joining the village officially in 1962. These changes were also reflected in how the local Greek population labelled them, previously as Tourkoghyftoi 'Turkish gypsies', later after their religious conversion as Ghyftoi 'gypsies'. The term "Turkish" is used as a generic term for Muslims in the area. The word Ghyftoi used in Parakalamos is overall not considered derogatory in the village, unlike its usage in the rest of Greece. Parakalamos Roma marry among themselves, although increasingly there have been a few marriages with non–Roma. Parakalamos Roma have maintained their links with their Muslim Romani relatives in Albania. Musicians from several musical Parakalamos Romani families are clarinet players and perform traditional Greek and Arabesque music at various functions and gatherings in both the village and wider region.

== See also ==
- List of settlements in the Ioannina regional unit
