= Stavrodromi, Ioannina =

Stavrodromi
- Settlement
- Location within Greece
- Coordinates: 39°56′3″N 20°24′42″E
- Country: Greece
- Administrative region: Epirus
- Regional unit: Ioannina
- Municipality: Pogoni
- Municipal unit: Delvinaki
- Community: Teriachi
- Elevation: 559 m (1,834 ft)

Population (2021)
  - Total: 10
- Time zone: UTC+2 (EET)
  - Summer (DST): UTC+3 (EEST)

Stavrodromi (Greek: Σταυροδρόμι, before 1929: Βομπλό, Vomplo) is a settlement in Ioannina regional unit, Epirus, Greece. It is part of the community of Teriachi.

== Name ==
The toponym is derived either from the Slavic noun (v)ǫb(ъ)lъ meaning 'source, well', or from the Slavic oblъ, earlier obьlъ, 'round', in composition with the Slavic preposition v(o), meaning 'to'.

== See also ==
- List of settlements in the Ioannina regional unit
