= Delvin (disambiguation) =

Delvin is a town in County Westmeath, Ireland. Delvin may also refer to:

- Delvin (barony), a barony in County Westmeath, Ireland
- Delvin (civil parish), a civil parish in County Westmeath
- Delvin River, a river in County Dublin
- Delvin (name), people by the name

== See also ==
- Delvino (disambiguation)
