= Kefalovryso, Ioannina =

Kefalovryso Κεφαλόβρυσο (Greek) Megidei (Aromanian)
- Community
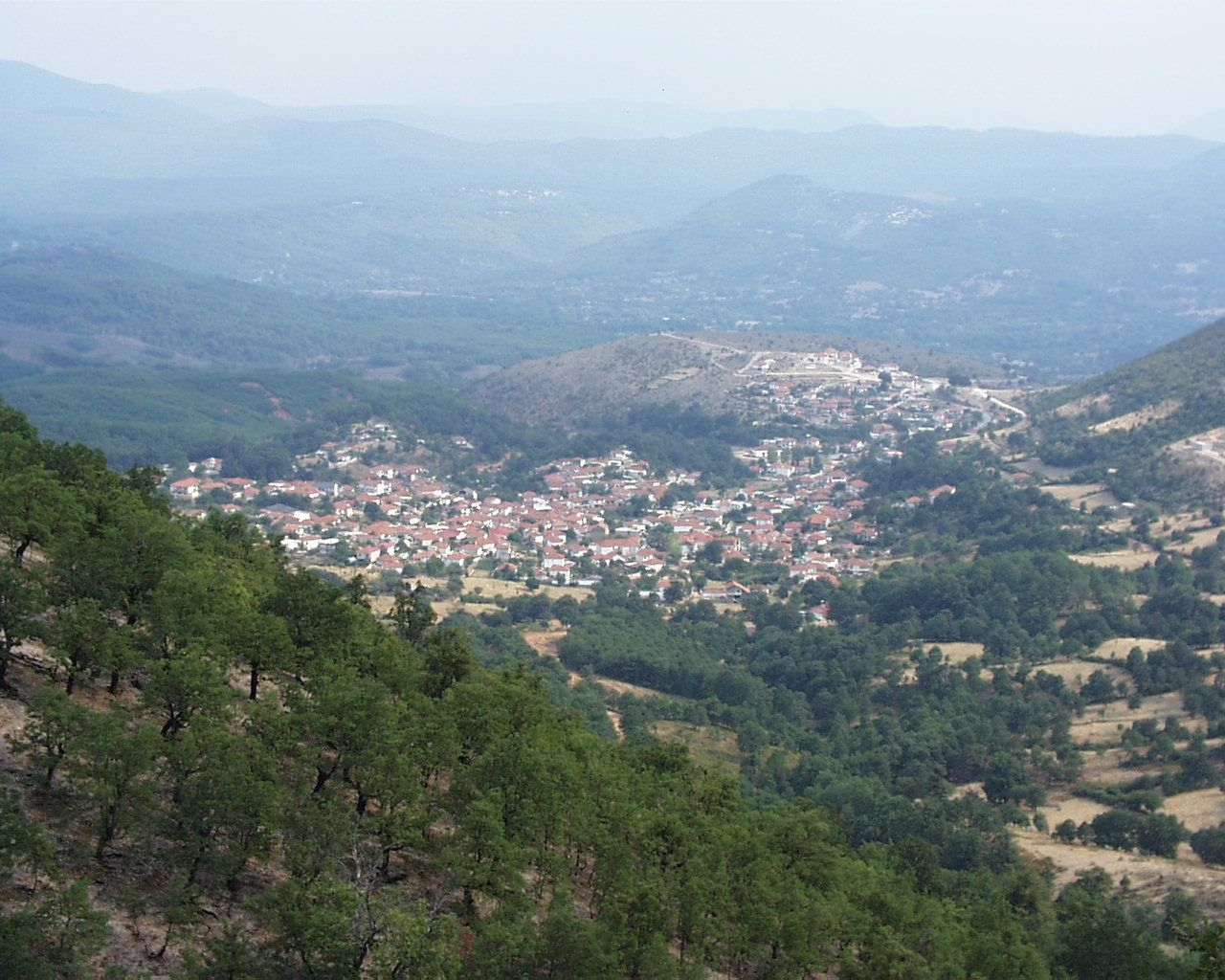

- Location within Greece
- Coordinates: 40°0.9′N 20°33.6′E
- Country: Greece
- Administrative region: Epirus
- Regional unit: Ioannina
- Municipality: Pogoni
- Municipal unit: Ano Pogoni

Area
  - Community: 15.831 km^{2} (6.112 sq mi)
- Elevation: 650 m (2,130 ft)

Population (2021)
  - Community: 564
  - Density: 35.6/km^{2} (92.3/sq mi)
- Time zone: UTC+2 (EET)
  - Summer (DST): UTC+3 (EEST)
- Postal code: 440 06
- Area code: +30-2657
- Vehicle registration: IN

Kefalovryso (Greek: Κεφαλόβρυσο, before 1927: Μετζητιές, Metzities; Aromanian: Megidei) is a mountain village and a community of the Pogoni municipality. Before the 2011 local government reform it was a part of the municipality of Ano Pogoni, of which it was a municipal district and the seat. The community of Kefalovryso covers an area of 15.831 km^{2}.

== Name ==
The toponym is from the male personal name Metzidies. It stems from the Aromanian meğidié 'one who belongs to the administration of Sultan Abdülmecid' and derives from the Turkish mecidî, in reference to 'that which has been created or established by or during the time of Sultan Abdülmecid'. In Turkish, the village is known as Mecidiye. Another derivation of the toponym links it to terrain or soil from the Aromanian meğidie, meaning 'purple-coloured one'. The new name Kefalovryso means 'headwater' in Greek.

== Geography ==
It is situated at the foot of mount Nemërçka, near the Albanian border. It is 3 km west of Vasiliko, 12 km northeast of Delvinaki, 16 km west of Konitsa, 36 km east of Gjirokastër (Albania) and 46 km northwest of Ioannina.

== History ==
The Aromanians of the area resided at an older settlement named Bitsikopoulo (in modern times the site is called Paliochori, 'old village') at Mt. Nemërçka. The aftermath of the Greek War of Independence caused regional instability, where Bitsikopoulo was destroyed by brigands in 1840 and abandoned by its population. The Aromanians were settled at a village named Metzities in 1853 by Ottoman Sultan Abdülmecid I. In the late 19th century scholar Ioannis Lambridis described the village as newly founded and its population as "mixed" Aromanians with 143 families.

Kefalovryso passed from the Ottoman Empire to Greece in 1913, during the Balkan Wars. In the 10th of July a massacre happened in the village. 22 men were put in two houses, with most of them being soldiers in World War Two. Only one of them survived and the rest were burnt alive.

During the interwar period, nomadic Aromanians used Kefalovryso as a brief stopover for their transhumant activities and the settled Aromanians of the village worked in the forestry sector or as shepherds tending to animals. In the 1970s and 1980s, some Aromanians from Kefalovryso migrated to Germany as guest workers and later returned to construct homes and create businesses with mixed results.

The entire Aromanian population in the region of Lunxhëria are composed of some Aromanians from Kefalovryso who had a presence in Albania and were left inside the country after the communist era closure of the border. In 1991, the border reopened and Lunxhëri Aromanians reconnected with relatives in Kefalovryso, often utilising the village as an initial destination before travelling to other locations in Greece for work.

== Demographics ==
Historical population
Year	Pop.	±%
1981	1,062	—
1991	1,122	+5.6%
2001	861	−23.3%
2011	838	−2.7%
2021	564	−32.7%

Kefalovryso has a mostly Aromanian population and is an Aromanian speaking village. Due to their origins from Albania, the Aromanian spoken in the village differs from the Aromanian spoken in the eastern Aromanian speaking area of Greek Epirus. Aromanian multipart singing (polyphony) is practised in the village.

== Infrastructure ==
In Kefalovryso, there is a primary school, a lyceum, a minor soccer team, a gymnasium, a church, a small post-office and a square in the centre with the town hall of Ano Pogoni. The factory that produces most of the Greek euro coins is located in Kefalovryso.

== See also ==
- List of settlements in the Ioannina regional unit
