= Paidonia =

- Settlement
- Location within Greece
- Coordinates: 39°49′43″N 20°32′50″E
- Country: Greece
- Administrative region: Epirus
- Regional unit: Ioannina
- Municipality: Pogoni
- Municipal unit: Ano Kalamas
- Community: Repetista
- Elevation: 508 m (1,667 ft)

Population (2021)
  - Total: 7
- Time zone: UTC+2 (EET)
  - Summer (DST): UTC+3 (EEST)

Paidonia (Greek: Παηδονιά) is a settlement in Ioannina regional unit, Epirus, Greece. It is part of the community of Repetista. The village is located at the base of Paleogribiani hill.

== Name ==
The toponym Paidonia is derived from the Slavic noun 'steep place', from the root pad- 'to fall' and the suffix -ynja; earlier -ynь with the Slavic d being rendered as t/đ and the Slavic y as u in Greek. The accent shifted downward due to the Greek formation of collective toponyms ending in -onia, and the intersyllabic -i- developed, probably through a false etymology associating it with the Greek word aidoni 'nightingale'.

== See also ==
- List of settlements in the Ioannina regional unit
