= Mavronoros, Ioannina =

Mavronoros Μαυρονόρος
- Community
- Location within Greece
- Coordinates: 39°51.5′N 20°32.4′E
- Country: Greece
- Administrative region: Epirus
- Regional unit: Ioannina
- Municipality: Pogoni
- Municipal unit: Ano Kalamas

Area
  - Community: 5.805 km^{2} (2.241 sq mi)
- Elevation: 536 m (1,759 ft)

Population (2021)
  - Community: 46
  - Density: 7.9/km^{2} (21/sq mi)
- Time zone: UTC+2 (EET)
  - Summer (DST): UTC+3 (EEST)
- Postal code: 440 04
- Area code: +30-2653
- Vehicle registration: IN

Mavronoros (Greek: Μαυρονόρος) is a village and a community of the Pogoni municipality. Before the 2011 local government reform it was a part of the municipality of Ano Kalamas, of which it was a municipal district. The 2021 census recorded 46 residents in the village. The community of Mavronoros covers an area of 5.805 km^{2}.

Mavronoros is among the villages of Epirus that display a distinct tradition in polyphonic singing. Today most of the local inhabitants live in the Greek urban centers as well as abroad. Some of them return to Mavronoros during the holiday seasons. In terms of folk music and dancing the village is known for its own style which is different from the typical "Parakalamos style" performed in the Pogoni region. As such, although administratively part of the municipality of Pogoni, Mavronoros and its inhabitants are regarded by certain performers in Pogoni as connected to Cham Albanians.

== See also ==
- List of settlements in the Grevena regional unit
