= Repetista =

- Community
- Location within Greece
- Coordinates: 39°50′41″N 20°34′39″E
- Country: Greece
- Administrative region: Epirus
- Regional unit: Ioannina
- Municipality: Pogoni
- Municipal unit: Ano Kalamas
- Elevation: 508 m (1,667 ft)

Population (2021)
  - Community: 140
- Time zone: UTC+2 (EET)
  - Summer (DST): UTC+3 (EEST)

Repetista (Greek: Ρεπετίστα) is a settlement in Ioannina regional unit, Epirus, Greece. The community consists of the villages Repetista and Paidonia.

== Name ==
The toponym is derived from the Greek surname Repetas and the Albanian ending -ishta stemming from the Slavic išta, a suffix used to denote the place where a person or thing referred to in the subject is indicated or located. The surname Repetas stems from the Albanian word rrepëtë or rreptë meaning 'harsh, fierce, quick tempered' when referring to living beings, or 'rough, wild, impetuous' when describing inanimate objects.

== See also ==
- List of settlements in the Ioannina regional unit
