= Chalkias =

Chalkias or Halkias (Greek: Χαλκιάς) is a Greek surname. The female version of the name is Chalkia or Halkia (Greek: Χαλκιά). Notable people with the surname include:

- Georgios Halkias (born 1967), Greek Tibetologist and Buddhist scholar
- Ioannis Chalkeus or Chalkias (1667–1730 or 1740), Aromanian scholar
- Kostas Chalkias (born 1974), Greek footballer
- Petroloukas Chalkias (1934–2025), Greek traditional musician
- Stavros Halkias (born 1989), American comedian
