= Oreino, Ioannina =

Oreino
- Community
- Location within Greece
- Coordinates: 39°58′16″N 20°20′15″E
- Country: Greece
- Administrative region: Epirus
- Regional unit: Ioannina
- Municipality: Pogoni
- Municipal unit: Delvinaki
- Elevation: 624 m (2,047 ft)

Population (2021)
  - Community: 5
- Time zone: UTC+2 (EET)
  - Summer (DST): UTC+3 (EEST)

Oreino (Greek: Ορεινό, before 1928: Μποζανίκον, Bozanikon) is a settlement in Ioannina regional unit, Epirus, Greece.

== Name ==
The toponym stems from the Slavic form božanikъ. It originates from the Slavic personal name Božan, feminine Božana, derived from the word bogъ 'god' and the ending -jan(ъ), feminine -jana, where the Slavic velar consonant g shifted to ž before the j. The placename has the suffix -ikъ.

== See also ==
- List of settlements in the Ioannina regional unit
