= Kastani =

- Community
- Location within Greece
- Coordinates: 39°50′12″N 20°25′37″E
- Country: Greece
- Administrative region: Epirus
- Regional unit: Ioannina
- Municipality: Pogoni
- Municipal unit: Delvinaki
- Elevation: 591 m (1,939 ft)

Population (2021)
  - Community: 83
- Time zone: UTC+2 (EET)
  - Summer (DST): UTC+3 (EEST)

Kastani (Greek: Καστανή, before 1953: Καστάνιανη, Kastaniani) is a settlement in Ioannina regional unit, Epirus, Greece.

== Name ==
In the late 19th century, the scholar Ioannis Lambridis described the village as a place abundant in chestnut tree growth. The placename stems from the Slavic form Kostanjane and is derived from the toponym Kostanj, from the word kostanь meaning 'chestnut' and the suffix -jane, used in the formation of words to denote an inhabitant of a region. The Slavic o became a through Greek in the toponym.

The linguist Kostas Oikonomou stated, toponyms with the suffix jane, also -jani, have Slavic words as their subject and the ending did not become productive in Greek; hence, attributing the above placename to a production from the Greek noun kastano or kastania is inapplicable.

== History ==
The Chronicle of Tsaraplana described Kastaniani as inhabited by Arvanites.

== See also ==
- List of settlements in the Ioannina regional unit
