= Stratinista =

- Community
- Location within Greece
- Coordinates: 39°51′21″N 20°28′49″E
- Country: Greece
- Administrative region: Epirus
- Regional unit: Ioannina
- Municipality: Pogoni
- Municipal unit: Delvinaki
- Elevation: 1,020 m (3,350 ft)

Population (2021)
  - Community: 44
- Time zone: UTC+2 (EET)
  - Summer (DST): UTC+3 (EEST)

Stratinista (Greek: Στρατίνιστα) is a settlement in Ioannina regional unit, Epirus, Greece.

== Name ==
The toponym is Slavic and is formed with the patronymic suffix -išt-, earlier -itj-, and the Slavic personal name Stratьnъ. It is a shortened version of Slavic names such as Strati-mir and Strati-slav, created with the suffix -inъ or -ьnъ, earlier -ynъ, where the Slavic y was rendered as i within Slavic itself. These Slavic personal names are formed from the root strat- meaning 'perish'.

== See also ==
- List of settlements in the Ioannina regional unit
