= Kerasovo, Ioannina =

Kerasovo
- Community
- Location within Greece
- Coordinates: 39°53′7″N 20°28′7″E
- Country: Greece
- Administrative region: Epirus
- Regional unit: Ioannina
- Municipality: Pogoni
- Municipal unit: Delvinaki
- Elevation: 764 m (2,507 ft)

Population (2021)
  - Community: 63
- Time zone: UTC+2 (EET)
  - Summer (DST): UTC+3 (EEST)

Kerasovo (Greek: Κεράσοβο) is a settlement in Ioannina regional unit, Epirus, Greece. The village is located on the north–western side of Mt. Kasidiaris.

== Name ==
The toponym Kerasovo is derived from Greek name Kerasos or Kerasis; it stems from the Greek root keras-, from the verb kerno meaning 'to serve, mix wine', and -ovo the Slavic suffix loan in Greek.

== Demographics ==
By the early 21st century, a large part of the village population has resettled in Ioannina.

== See also ==
- List of settlements in the Ioannina regional unit
