= Vristovo =

- Settlement
- Location within Greece
- Coordinates: 39°48′5″N 20°30′54″E
- Country: Greece
- Administrative region: Epirus
- Regional unit: Ioannina
- Municipality: Pogoni
- Municipal unit: Lavdani
- Community: Lavdani
- Elevation: 879 m (2,884 ft)

Population (2021)
  - Total: 17
- Time zone: UTC+2 (EET)
  - Summer (DST): UTC+3 (EEST)

Vristovo (Greek: Βρίστοβο) is a settlement in Ioannina regional unit, Epirus, Greece. It is part of the community of Lavdani.

== Name ==
The toponym stems from the Slavic form Brestovo and is derived from the Slavic noun brěstъ meaning 'elm', earlier berstъ, and the suffix -ovo. The Slavic ě became e in Greek and later shifted to i due to northern Greek pronunciation, while the development of secondary stress within the placename resulted in the form Vristovo.

== See also ==
- List of settlements in the Ioannina regional unit
