= Kouklioi =

Kouklioi Κουκλιοί
- Community
- Location within Greece
- Coordinates: 39°53′N 20°33′E
- Country: Greece
- Administrative region: Epirus
- Regional unit: Ioannina
- Municipality: Pogoni
- Municipal unit: Ano Kalamas

Population (2021)
  - Community: 318
- Time zone: UTC+2 (EET)
  - Summer (DST): UTC+3 (EEST)
- Vehicle registration: ΙΝ

Kouklioi (Greek: Κουκλιοί) is a village in the former municipality of Ano Kalamas, Ioannina regional unit, Epirus, Greece. Since the 2011 local government reform it is part of the municipality of Pogoni. Population 318 (2021).

== Name ==
In the late 19th century scholar Ioannis Lambridis wrote the placename as Koukoulioi. The toponym Kouklioi has two possible etymologies. The first is derived from a Greek surname Koukouli, from the word koukouli 'cocoon', a diminutive of the Latin loan cuculla, related to the Greek koukoula. The placename began as a possessive form, stis Koukoulious, and due to the northern Greek phonetics where the unstressed vowel u was dropped, Koukoulious became pronounced as Kouklous. Later, this plural accusative form was eventually reinterpreted as a nominative plural, resulting in the name Kouklioi.

The second stems from Koklou whereby its possessive form stis Koklous and plural forms Kokloi and Kouklioi arose as the o sound narrowed into a u and the l softened near the i (-oi) sound. Koklou is derived from the surname Koklas which stems from the Albanian word kok/ël meaning 'knot, a burl in wood, loop'.

== Demographics ==
Some Aromanians settled in the village following the interwar period.
