= Zavrocho =

- Settlement
- Location within Greece
- Coordinates: 39°54′51″N 20°24′00″E
- Country: Greece
- Administrative region: Epirus
- Regional unit: Ioannina
- Municipality: Pogoni
- Municipal unit: Delvinaki
- Community: Mavropoulo
- Elevation: 508 m (1,667 ft)

Population (2021)
  - Total: 19
- Time zone: UTC+2 (EET)
  - Summer (DST): UTC+3 (EEST)

Zavrocho (Greek: Ζάβροχο) is a settlement in Ioannina regional unit, Epirus, Greece. It is part of the community of Mavropoulo. The village is located on a hill where control can be exerted over the Drino valley, an entry point into Albania. The chapel of Agios Georgios is behind the hill. Culturally, the village of Zavrocho is part of Dropull, an area which also extends into Albania. The village in the modern period is also placed as being part of Upper Pogoni.

== Name ==
The linguist Max Vasmer derived the placename from the Slavic preposition za meaning 'behind' and the noun vrh 'top, edge', while vowel development within the toponym occurred in Greek. The linguist Kostas Oikonomou stated the vowel development was not through Greek, as in several Slavic languages the vowel adjacent to the r is present in forms rendered with a consonant and vowel, such as the Bulgarian vrъh and Russian verh.

== Demographics ==
The village is inhabited by Greeks.

== See also ==
- List of settlements in the Ioannina regional unit
