= Mavropoulo, Ioannina =

Mavropoulo
- Community
- Location within Greece
- Coordinates: 39°55′28″N 20°22′49″E
- Country: Greece
- Administrative region: Epirus
- Regional unit: Ioannina
- Municipality: Pogoni
- Municipal unit: Delvinaki
- Elevation: 535 m (1,755 ft)

Population (2021)
  - Community: 40
- Time zone: UTC+2 (EET)
  - Summer (DST): UTC+3 (EEST)

Mavropoulo (Greek: Μαυρόπουλο) is a settlement in Ioannina regional unit, Epirus, Greece. The community consists of the villages Mavropoulo, Zavrocho and Chrysodouli. Culturally, the village of Mavropoulo is part of Dropull, an area which also extends into Albania. The village in the modern period is also placed as being part of Lower Pogoni. Nearby the village are the ruins of an unnamed medieval city.

== Name ==
The toponym is derived from the Greek surname Mavropoulos, formed from the Greek word mavros 'black' and the surname suffix opoulos. In 1431, Mavropoulo was mentioned in the Ottoman registry for the Sanjak of Albania (Arvanid) as a village in the Vilayet of Gjirokastër.

== Demographics ==
The village is inhabited by Greeks. By the early 21st century, the majority of the village population has resettled in Australia and the USA.

== See also ==
- List of settlements in the Ioannina regional unit
