= Farangi, Ioannina =

Farangi
- Community
- Location within Greece
- Coordinates: 39°56′59″N 20°26′3″E
- Country: Greece
- Administrative region: Epirus
- Regional unit: Ioannina
- Municipality: Pogoni
- Municipal unit: Delvinaki
- Elevation: 764 m (2,507 ft)

Population (2021)
  - Community: 12
- Time zone: UTC+2 (EET)
  - Summer (DST): UTC+3 (EEST)

Farangi (Greek: Φαράγγι, before 1928: Γκουβέρι, Gkouveri) is a settlement in Ioannina regional unit, Epirus, Greece.

== Name ==
The toponym is from the surname Gouveris, also Gouveros, and is derived from the Albanian term gubere/guberja 'a type of short cape made of goat's wool that reaches the knees', stemming from the Serbo-Croatian guba 'fur' and Bulgarian guber 'rug'. Within the placename, the Albanian b became v through Greek.

== History ==
Albanians settled in Pogoni during the first decades of the 14th century and traces of their presence are found in several local toponyms such as Gkouveri. Over time, the Albanian presence was assimilated by the Greeks of Pogoni and hellenised.

== See also ==
- List of settlements in the Ioannina regional unit
