= Drymades =

Drymades or Drimades can mean:

- Dhërmi, a village in Vlorë County, Albania, known as Drymades in Greek
- Drymades, Ioannina, a village in northern Greece
