= Geoffrey Samuel =

British Indologist and researcher (born 1946)

Geoffrey Samuel (born 22 November 1946) is an emeritus professor of religious studies at Cardiff University. He is known for his ethnographic studies of Tibetan and other Indic religions, investigating topics such as yoga, tantra, and the subtle body.

== Life ==
Geoffrey Brian Samuel was educated at Leeds Grammar School and University College, Oxford, graduating with a bachelor's degree in physics in 1967. Moving to Trinity Hall, Cambridge, he took Part III of the Mathematical Tripos (theoretical physics) in 1968, switching to gain a certificate in Social Anthropology in 1969. He carried out ethnographic fieldwork in India and Nepal in 1971-2, and completed his PhD on Tibetan religion and society at Cambridge in 1975. He then gained a Postgraduate Diploma in Computer Science at the University of Newcastle, New South Wales, in 1985.

He has carried out fieldwork in India, Nepal, China, Bhutan, and other Asian countries, studying religion and health practices. He became a Professorial Fellow at the University of Cardiff in 2007, and then a full professor, a post he held until his retirement in 2014. He then moved to Australia, where he researches and supervises postgraduates.

== Reception ==
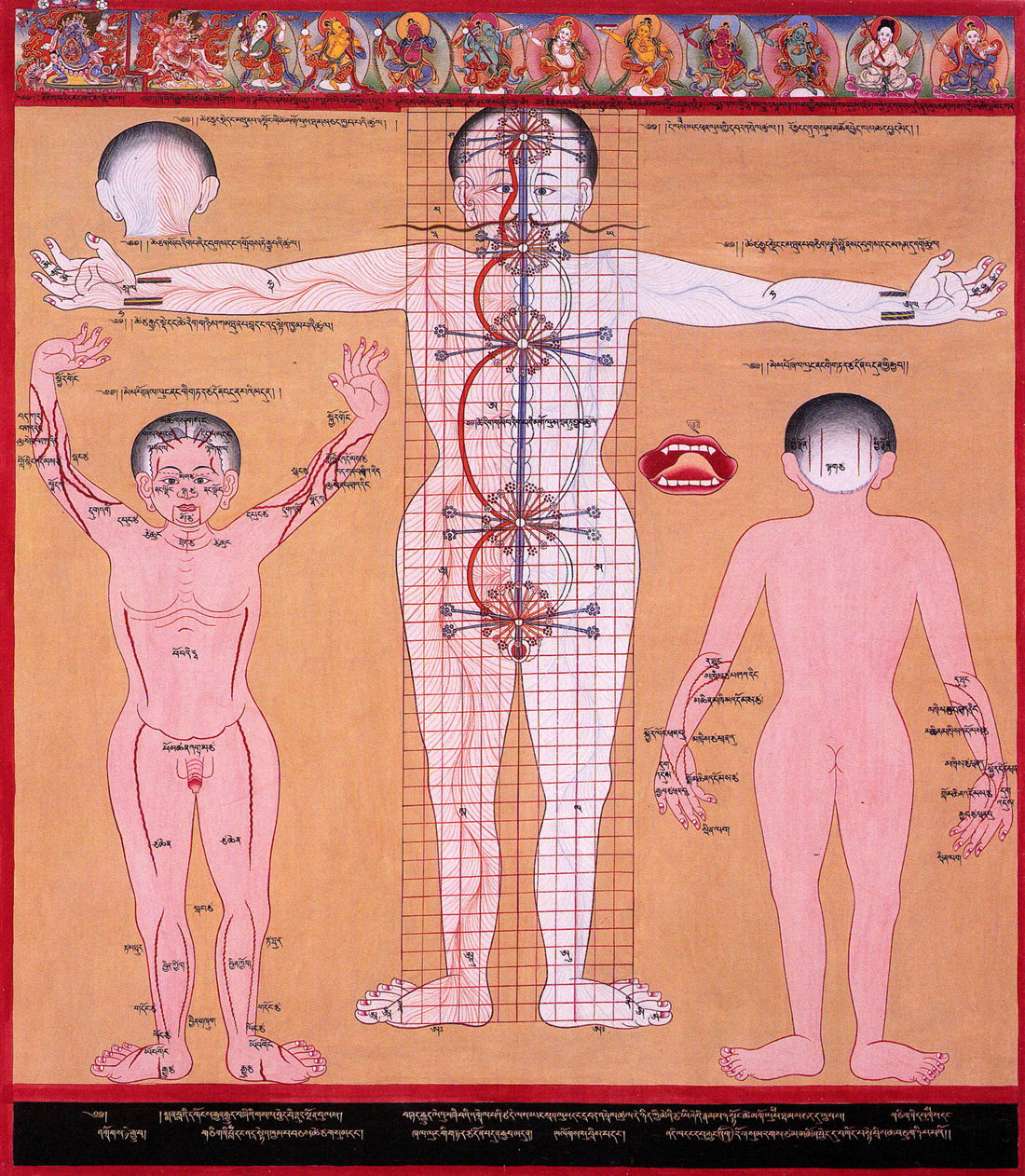
A Tibetan illustration of the subtle body showing the central nadi (channel) and two side channels connecting five chakras

Stuart Ray Sarbacker, reviewing The Origins of Yoga and Tantra for the International Journal of Hindu Studies, writes that in the book Samuel brings together his own Indian and Tibetan work with wider scholarship, creating "a coherent and lucid narrative of the development of Yoga and Tantra within a richly contextualized social history of Indic religion", including Hinduism, Buddhism, and Jainism. Sarbacker contrasts the book with Mircea Eliade's 1958 Yoga: Immortality and Freedom which gave little in the way of social context.

Loriliai Biernacki, reviewing Religion and the Subtle Body for Asian Medicine, called it an ambitious endeavour to describe the subtle body in different geographic and philosophical traditions, from Daoist energy flow to the "transmigratory" Tibetan and Indian body of chakras and nadis and modern theosophy and new age shamanic astral bodies.

Georgios T. Halkias, reviewing Introducing Tibetan Buddhism, called it a knowledgeable and instructive introduction to the topic, providing an "innovative and refreshing" approach covering aspects omitted in other introductions to Tibetan Buddhism. Halkias found the book admirably balanced between simplification and expertise, though he regretted the poor quality of Routledge's images throughout their book series, and the absence of a "comprehensive bibliography".

== Books ==
- Samuel, G. B. 1993. Civilized Shamans. Smithsonian
- Rozario, S. T. and Samuel, G. B. eds. 2002. The daughters of Hariti: childbirth and female healers in South and Southeast Asia. Routledge.
- Samuel, G. B. 2005. Tantric revisionings: new understandings of Tibetan Buddhism and Indian religion. Motilal Banarsidass; Ashgate Publishing.
- Samuel, G. B. 2008. The origins of yoga and tantra: Indic religions to the thirteenth century. Cambridge University Press.
- Samuel, G. B. 2012. Introducing Tibetan Buddhism. World Religions. Routledge.
- Dondhup, Y., Pagel, U. and Samuel, G. B. eds. 2013. Monastic and lay traditions in North-Eastern Tibet. Brill.
- Samuel, G. B. and Johnston, J. eds. 2013. Religion and the subtle body in Asia and the West: between mind and body. Routledge Studies in Asian Religion and Philosophy Vol. 8. Routledge.
