= Neochori, Ioannina =

Neochori
- Settlement
- Location within Greece
- Coordinates: 39°53′58″N 20°22′46″E
- Country: Greece
- Administrative region: Epirus
- Regional unit: Ioannina
- Municipality: Pogoni
- Municipal unit: Delvinaki
- Community: Ktismata
- Elevation: 508 m (1,667 ft)

Population (2021)
  - Total: 6
- Time zone: UTC+2 (EET)
  - Summer (DST): UTC+3 (EEST)

Neochori (Greek: Νεοχώρι, before 1955: Νέα Κατούνα, Nea Katouna) is a settlement in Ioannina regional unit, Epirus, Greece. It is part of the community of Ktismata. Culturally, the village of Neochori is part of Dropull, an area which also extends into Albania.

== Name ==
The toponym is derived from the Middle Greek word katouna, meaning 'dwelling, room, tent, settlement, camp, military equipment, supplies'. The term is present in several Balkan languages such as Aromanian catuna 'straw covered hut', Romanian catun 'small village', Slavic katunъ 'fortress, camp'; all of these stem from the Italian cantone.

== History ==
Following the creation of the Albanian–Greek border, the village was established in the period toward the end of the Second World War. The village was named Nea Katouna to contrast it from the settlement of Katundi (from the Albanian word katund meaning 'village') which was located in Albania.

== See also ==
- List of settlements in the Ioannina regional unit
