= Teriachi =

- Community
- Location within Greece
- Coordinates: 39°55′51″N 20°23′42″E
- Country: Greece
- Administrative region: Epirus
- Regional unit: Ioannina
- Municipality: Pogoni
- Municipal unit: Delvinaki
- Elevation: 764 m (2,507 ft)

Population (2021)
  - Community: 23
- Time zone: UTC+2 (EET)
  - Summer (DST): UTC+3 (EEST)

Teriachi (Greek: Τεριάχι) is a settlement in Ioannina regional unit, Epirus, Greece. The community consists of the villages Teriachi and Stavrodromi.

== Name ==
The toponym has three possible derivations. The first is the Slavic common noun Turijak, stemming from the Slavic turъ. The second is the Slavic possessive-adjective type turjь, from Slavic turъ meaning 'wild bull, wild goat' and the suffix -jь, feminine -ja, with the suffix -akъ, which is used to turn adjectives into nouns. The third is the noun turъ and the suffix -jakъ, which is also added to nouns.

The following linguistic changes are present among all three versions. These include the change of u to e in Greek, a shift occurring near liquid consonants, and the evolution of k toward the phonetically related h sound. The origin of the placename being derived from a personal name, either a surname or a family name, is supported by the toponym Terihat in Dropull, Albania, which uses the Albanian suffix -ati to denote family membership.

== See also ==
- List of settlements in the Ioannina regional unit
