= Charavgi, Ioannina =

Charavgi
- Community
- Location within Greece
- Coordinates: 39°52′4″N 20°23′51″E
- Country: Greece
- Administrative region: Epirus
- Regional unit: Ioannina
- Municipality: Pogoni
- Municipal unit: Delvinaki
- Elevation: 508 m (1,667 ft)

Population (2021)
  - Community: 54
- Time zone: UTC+2 (EET)
  - Summer (DST): UTC+3 (EEST)

Charavgi (Greek: Χαραυγή, before 1956: Βάλτιστα, Valtista) is a settlement in Ioannina regional unit, Epirus, Greece.

== Name ==
The placename Valtista is rendered as Valtice in the Ottoman register of 1431. The toponym is derived from the Slavic noun blato, earlier bolto meaning 'marsh, mud', and the Slavic suffix -išta, where through Greek b became v and a transposition of l occurred. The word exists in other Balkan languages such as Aromanian, Romanian and Megleno-Romanian baltă, Albanian baltë and Greek valtos with all either being loanwords from Slavic or derived from an old Balkan term. The word blato is used in toponyms in many Slavic speaking areas. The new name Charavgi means 'dawn' in Greek.

== See also ==
- List of settlements in the Ioannina regional unit
