= Dolo, Ioannina =

Dolo
- Community
- Location within Greece
- Coordinates: 39°59′28″N 20°26′29″E
- Country: Greece
- Administrative region: Epirus
- Regional unit: Ioannina
- Municipality: Pogoni
- Municipal unit: Pogoniani
- Elevation: 1,276 m (4,186 ft)

Population (2021)
  - Community: 39
- Time zone: UTC+2 (EET)
  - Summer (DST): UTC+3 (EEST)

Dolo (Greek: Δολό) is a settlement in Ioannina regional unit, Epirus, Greece.

== Name ==
In the late 19th century scholar Ioannis Lambridis described the village as being at a low altitude, briefly warmed in winter due to the surrounding mountains. The toponym is derived from the word dolъ 'valley' in old Slavic.

== Demographics ==
Some Aromanians settled in Dolo following the interwar period. Aromanians reside in certain neighbourhoods and constitute a segment of the village population.

== See also ==
- List of settlements in the Ioannina regional unit
