= Zaravina, Ioannina =

Zaravina
- Community
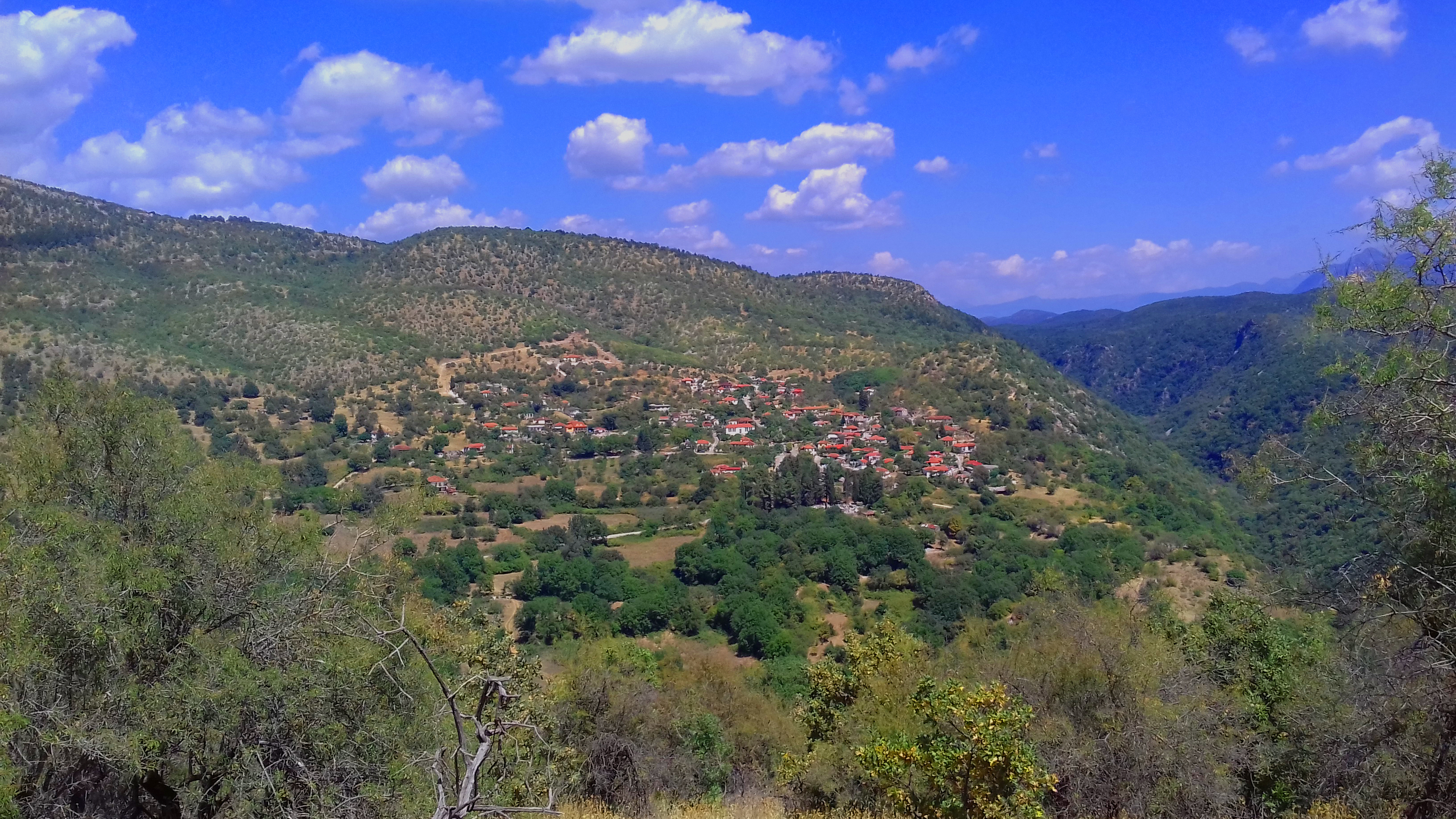

- Location within Greece
- Coordinates: 39°54′54″N 20°32′19″E
- Country: Greece
- Administrative region: Epirus
- Regional unit: Ioannina
- Municipality: Pogoni
- Municipal unit: Pogoniani
- Elevation: 621 m (2,037 ft)

Population (2021)
  - Community: 53
- Time zone: UTC+2 (EET)
  - Summer (DST): UTC+3 (EEST)

Zaravina (Greek: Ζαραβίνα, between 1928 and 2020: Λίμνη, Limni) is a settlement in Ioannina regional unit, Epirus, Greece.

== Name ==
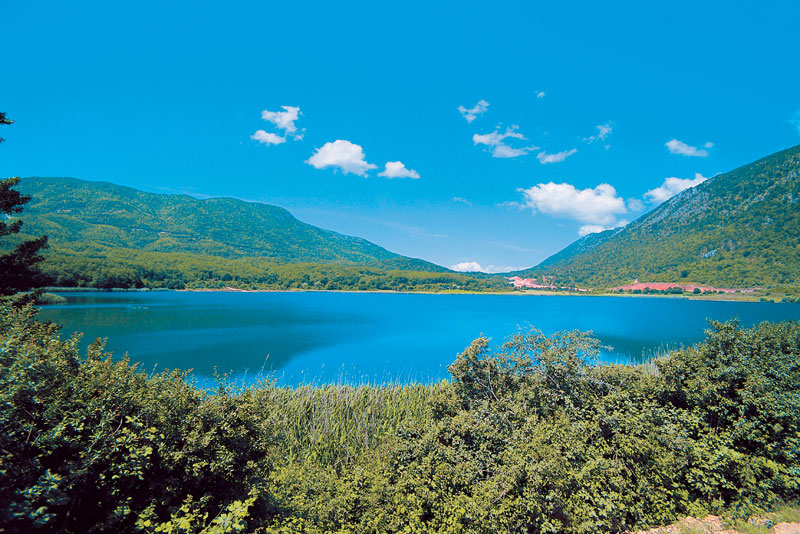
Lake Zaravina

The local form of the placename is Zaravina. Other forms, in particular used by foreigners, such as travellers, include Zarobina, Tsarabina and Tserabina. These variations are due to Latin renderings of the name with β as b and z as ts or to a false etymology linked to the Slavic carь, from cьsarь 'emperor', indicated by the name Kaisarochorion as an interpretation of the toponym recorded by the scholar Panagiotis Aravantinos as Zarovina. The linguist Kostas Oikonomou states these forms should be disregarded for the etymology of the toponym.

Zaravina is derived from the form Zarovina, where o became a within the toponym. Both linguists Max Vasmer and Phaedon Malingoudis state the placename is formed from the Slavic prefix za meaning 'behind' and the toponym Rovьna, derived from the Slavic rovъ 'ditch, channel, pit' and the ending ьna, masculine -ьnъ. Oikonomou wrote the village is located behind a lake and aligns with the etymology of the toponym of being behind a pit-like geographical feature, a lake. Alternative etymologies by Vasmer are the toponym is from the Slavic žeravь 'crane', while linguist Yordan Zaimov, referring to the form Tserabina, derives the name from cerъ 'oak', hence cerov-ina meaning 'place of oaks'. Nearby is the Lake of Zaravina, and the Greek word for lake Limni was used for the new name of the village.

== Demographics ==
Some Aromanians settled in the village following the interwar period.

== See also ==
- List of settlements in the Ioannina regional unit
