= Ktismata =

Ktismata Κτίσματα
- Community
- Location within Greece
- Coordinates: 39°54′N 20°24′E
- Country: Greece
- Administrative region: Epirus
- Regional unit: Ioannina
- Municipality: Pogoni
- Municipal unit: Delvinaki

Population (2021)
  - Community: 133
- Time zone: UTC+2 (EET)
  - Summer (DST): UTC+3 (EEST)
- Vehicle registration: IN

Ktismata (Greek: Κτίσματα, before 1927: Αρίνιστα, Arinista) is a village and a community in the municipal unit of Delvinaki, Ioannina regional unit, Epirus, in northwestern Greece. It is situated on a hillside on the right bank of the river Drinos, at 412 m above sea level. It is 3 km from the Greek - Albanian border at Kakavia. The community consists of the villages Ktismata and Neochori. Ktismata is 7 km southwest of Delvinaki, 30 km southeast of Gjirokastër (Albania) and 47 km northwest of Ioannina. The Greek National Road 22 (Kakavia - Kalpaki) passes north of the village.

Culturally, the village of Ktismata is part of Dropull, an area which also extends into Albania. The village in the modern period is also placed as being part of Lower Pogoni.

== Name ==
The toponym has two possible derivations. The first is derived from the Aromanian noun arin 'alder', from the Latin alinus, earlier alnus, and the Slavic derived suffix in Aromanian -iște and -iștea. The second stems from the Aromanian noun arina 'sand', from the Latin arena and the Slavic derived suffix in Aromanian -iște, due to the Drino river and its tributary, the Gyftopotamos. The new name Ktismata means 'buildings' in Greek.

== History ==
In the Ottoman period, village lands were administered by an Aga, an Ottoman official on behalf of a Pasha based in the region. Ottoman rule ended and under Greece the lands were placed under the administration of Greek authorities; later they were redistributed by the state to the villagers. Gjirokastër was the main market town for the village in the Ottoman era and interwar period until the closure of the Albanian–Greek border following the Second World War. In both World War Two and later the Greek Civil War, the village was razed and later it was relocated to a site at the base of a hill. Some surviving building materials were reused to construct the new village. Greek multipart singing (polyphony) is practised in the village.

== Demographics ==
Year	Village population	Community population
1981	251	—
1991	215	—
2001	354	368
2011	246	253
2021	127	133

== See also ==
- List of settlements in the Ioannina regional unit
