= Ano Parakalamos =

- Settlement
- Location within Greece
- Coordinates: 39°50′1″N 20°32′39″E
- Country: Greece
- Administrative region: Epirus
- Regional unit: Ioannina
- Municipality: Pogoni
- Municipal unit: Ano Kalamas
- Community: Parakalamos
- Elevation: 508 m (1,667 ft)

Population (2021)
  - Total: 38
- Time zone: UTC+2 (EET)
  - Summer (DST): UTC+3 (EEST)

Ano Parakalamos (Greek: Άνω Παρακάλαμος, before 1927: Πογδόριανη, Pogdoriani) is a settlement in Ioannina regional unit, Epirus, Greece. It is part of the community of Parakalamos.

== Name ==
The original name of the village is Pogdoriani. The old Slavic form of the toponym is podъgorjane indicating 'those who live at the foot of the mountain' and is derived from the Slavic preposition podъ meaning 'below' and the noun gora 'mountain, forest'. The Slavic suffix -jane is used to denote the inhabitants of a place, with a transposition of the d and g sounds. The village moved to the plain at a location called Kalyvia meaning 'huts'; this site later adopted the new name Parakalamos, while the original location of Pogdoriani was renamed Ano (Upper) Parakalamos. Slavic placenames were replaced with Greek names by the state. The new placename Parakalamos was a modern bureaucratic creation and a compound formation with the Greek prefix para 'beside' and the word kalami 'reed' or kalamos 'stalk, cane', possibly from a forgotten old placename.

== History ==
Pogdoriani has a continuous history of settlement. It is located at the base of Paleogribiani hill. The village was destroyed in 1718. The inhabitants of Pogdoriani owned shacks at site called Kalyvia on the fertile plain of Gormos to work their fields and graze animals. The distance between both locations was 5 km and villagers wanted to avoid the long trek. The movement to the plain by the population began toward the end of Ottoman rule in 1913, when the village was razed by the Ottoman army. The settlement was moved to the location after people from Pogdoriani built houses. By the 1928 Greek census, the new locality Parakalamos was recorded as a sub–settlement of Pogdoriani. The village was affected by the Second World War and the Greek Civil War. There was partial reconstruction of the village. In 1951, Ano Parakalamos gained status as a standalone village from the Greek government and was joined to the community of Parakalamos. Every May, villagers from both Ano Parakalamos and Parakalamos gather at Ano Parakalamos for a panighyri (religious festival) celebrating St. John the Apostle.

== Demographics ==
The village was inhabited by Greeks, who in the early 20th century relocated to the new site of the village (modern Parakalamos) on the plain. In the 21st century, Ano Parakalamos is inhabited by Aromanians.

== See also ==
- List of settlements in the Ioannina regional unit
