= Deropolitissa =

Deropolitissa (Greek: Δεροπολίτισσα, Girl of Dropull) is a Greek polyphonic folk song, popular in the region of Dropull, southern Albania. It is also sung by the rest of the Greeks in Albania, as well as in parts of Greece.

== Background and popularity ==
The song refers to the period of Ottoman occupation (15th-19th century) and is a lament inspired by the persecutions of the Greek Christian element during that time, when forcible conversions and Islamizations had taken place by the Ottoman authorities.

Deropolitissa is a representative song from the region of Dropull, Gjirokaster District in southern Albania. The song is also sung by all Greek communities living in parts of southern Albania, known as Northern Epirus, as well as in parts of Greece, such as in the village of Ktismata, in Pogoni, near the Greek-Albanian border. It is also sung in the rest of Epirus, as it is a popular song at the panigiria.

== Song ==
The song is performed in a 3/4 tempo of 4/4 (2-2), but also in 5/8. The first soloist (the partis) sings in a narrative way, while other members of the drone group, second soloist, spiner and isokrates provide the vocal backing.

Deropolitissa is danced in a Syrtos manner in two circles.

== Lyrics ==
The singers are urging their fellow Christian, a girl from Dropull, not to imitate their example but keep his faith and pray for them to the church. Part of the verse goes as follows:

English

...and go to the church
with lamps and candles
and with sweet-smelling incense
pray for us too
because Turkey has seized us,
so as all of Arvanitia (Albania),
to take us to the mosques,
and slaughter us like lambs,
like goats in Saint George’s day
like lambs in Easter

Greek

σύ (ντ)α πας στην εκκλησιά,
με λαμπάδες με κεριά,
και με μοσκοθυμιατά,
για προσκύνα για τ’ εμάς,
τι μας πλάκωσε η Τουρκιά,
κι όλη η Αρβανιτιά,
και μας σέρνουν στα Τζαμιά,
και μας σφάζουν σαν τ’ αρνιά,
σαν τ’ αρνιά την Πασχαλιά.
σαν κατσίκια τ’ Αγιωργιού.
