= Palaiopyrgos, Ioannina =

Palaiopyrgos
- Community
- Location within Greece
- Coordinates: 40°1′43″N 20°29′15″E
- Country: Greece
- Administrative region: Epirus
- Regional unit: Ioannina
- Municipality: Pogoni
- Municipal unit: Ano Pogoni
- Elevation: 764 m (2,507 ft)

Population (2021)
  - Community: 95
- Time zone: UTC+2 (EET)
  - Summer (DST): UTC+3 (EEST)

Palaiopyrgos (Greek: Παλαιόπυργος, before 1927: Μεβδέζα, Mevdeza) is a settlement in Ioannina regional unit, Epirus, Greece.

== Name ==
The toponym stems from the Slavic form Medvedja and underwent a Slavic (Bulgarian) shift where dj became žd and the Slavic ě was rendered in Greek as e, resulting in the form Medvežda. This was followed by a metathesis of dv to vd and a dissimilatory shift of d into a y sound, evolving the cluster (v)d-(ž)d into (v)y-(ž)d. The Slavic form Medvědja is derived from the Slavic word medvědь, meaning 'one who eats honey, bear' stemming from medь 'honey' and the suffix -ja, masculine -jь.

== See also ==
- List of settlements in the Ioannina regional unit
