= Chrysodouli =

- Settlement
- Location within Greece
- Coordinates: 39°55′59″N 20°21′56″E
- Country: Greece
- Administrative region: Epirus
- Regional unit: Ioannina
- Municipality: Pogoni
- Municipal unit: Delvinaki
- Community: Mavropoulo
- Elevation: 764 m (2,507 ft)

Population (2021)
  - Total: 16
- Time zone: UTC+2 (EET)
  - Summer (DST): UTC+3 (EEST)

Chrysodouli (Greek: Χρυσόδουλη) is a settlement in Ioannina regional unit, Epirus, Greece. It is part of the community of Mavropoulo. Culturally, the village of Chrysodouli is part of Dropull, an area which also extends into Albania. The village in the modern period is also placed as being part of Upper Pogoni.

== Name ==
The toponym has two possible derivations. The first is from the personal name Chrysodouli, a compound formation from the name Chrysa, also Chryso, and the noun douli. This name is derived from the Greek word chrysos 'gold' and compound names with the term existed in ancient and medieval periods.

The second stems from the personal name Christodouli, also Christodoulos. The form underwent the elimination of the unstressed i, (hrstođul) and the evolution of the consonant of the cluster hrst into hst with the elimination of the intersymphonic r (hstođul), and the final evolution of st into s (hsođul). This form, which refers to the word gold, eventually became Chrysodouli. Linguist Kostas Oikonomou states that the circumstances which resulted in the toponym being formed are unknown.

== Demographics ==
Under Ottoman rule the population of Chrysodouli were mostly Muslim Albanians and spoke Albanian, whom local Greeks called "Turks". The term "Turk" was used as a generic term for Muslims during the Ottoman period. In 1913 some Muslim Albanians left the village and others in the period of the Greek–Turkish population exchange (1923). The Albanian government described Greek authorities had pressured some Muslim Albanians to leave the village for Turkey, although a League of Nations commission in 1924 found no examples in Chrysodouli involving such methods. A Muslim Roma community resided in the village who spoke Romani and were called Tourkogiftoi 'Turkish gypsies' by local Greeks. Following the Balkan Wars (1912–1913) the Muslim Roma left Chrysodouli during 1915–1925 and resettled in the new village of Parakalamos.

People from several areas moved into Chrysodouli, some were Aromanians. In the early 21st century, the inhabitants are Greeks. Social relations between the population of Chrysodouli with other neighbouring villages in the modern period remain distant due to the legacy of being a former Muslim village.

== See also ==
- List of settlements in the Ioannina regional unit
