= Delvino =

Delvino may refer to the following places:

== Bulgaria ==
- Delvino, Blagoevgrad Province
- Delvino, Kardzhali Province

== Albania ==
- Greek name for Delvinë, municipality in Vlorë County
