= Meropi, Ioannina =

Meropi
- Community
- Location within Greece
- Coordinates: 40°1′49″N 20°28′52″E
- Country: Greece
- Administrative region: Epirus
- Regional unit: Ioannina
- Municipality: Pogoni
- Municipal unit: Ano Pogoni
- Elevation: 845 m (2,772 ft)

Population (2021)
  - Community: 56
- Time zone: UTC+2 (EET)
  - Summer (DST): UTC+3 (EEST)

Meropi (Greek: Μερόπη, before 1928: Ρουμπάτες, Roumpates) is a settlement in Ioannina regional unit, Epirus, Greece.

== Name ==
The toponym is derived from the surname Roumpatis; it is a plural formation to indicate members of a family and the place where they settled. Roumpatis stems from the surname Roumpos and the Albanian suffix -at(i) where, in addition to forming ethnonyms, it is used to denote members of a family.

The surname Roumpos stems from the Greek Epirote word roumos meaning 'withered man, small-boned', and alongside another similar term, the Greek Epirote rombos meaning 'knot, the fist', stems from the Slavic rombъ 'rag'.

== See also ==
- List of settlements in the Ioannina regional unit
