= Song of Çelo Mezani =

Albanian folk song

The Song of Çelo Mezani (Albanian: Kënga e Çelo Mezanit) is an Albanian polyphonic folk song. It is considered to be the best-known Cham Albanian song. The song increased the awareness in Albania about the Chameria region and its history.

== History ==
The song was composed during the period of the Albanian National Awakening and is a narrative and a lament of the death of Çelo Mezani, a well-known Cham Albanian revolutionary from the village of Arpitsa (modern Perdika) in modern north-western Greece (Çamëria). Çelo Mezani lived in the late 19th century and was a kaçak who fought against Ottoman and participated in the anti Tanizmat Albanian revolt of 1847. It is not clear what happened to him but it is thought that the Ottoman agents managed to kill him through betrayal.

== Song ==
The song of Çelo Mezani consists of three parts and is sung by two soloists and a drone group. It was recorded officially in 1957 in Fier in the Myzeqe region and in Skelë in the area of Vlorë by Cham Albanian refugees who had settled in those areas after the expulsion of Cham Albanians. In both recording the groups sang a cappella.

It was supposed to be performed in the National Folklore Festival of Gjirokastër in 1973, but the communist regime censored it. In 1978 it was performed for the first time at the National Folklore Festival of Gjirokastër by a folk singers' group from Rrogozhinë. In the festival of Gjirokastër the song was accompanied by an instrumental ensemble of violin, clarinet, lahutë and def. It was well received by the public and became a synonym of Cham Albanian music. The Song of Çelo Mezani is a polyphonic song well known throughout Albania and revered for having a deeply emotional quality and artistic mastery. According to Albanian composer Agim Krajka, the song was one of the best ways for the Albanian public to know better the Chameria region and its history.

== Lyrics ==
The first soloist sings in a narrative way, while the second soloist replies to him by singing the second part of the verse again. The drone group provides vocal backing. The first verse of the song is:

Albanian

Doli djelli ne Malavire,
Qisi Çelua ne Harile,
Qisi Çelua ne Harile,
Për të shkretën Pajgorile,
Për te shkretën Pajgorile.

English

The sun arose in Malavire,
Çelo came out in Harile,
Çelo came out in Harile,
For the damned condolences,
For the damned condolences.

Published in 1995, a rendition of the song was recorded in Tirana (1945) by folklorist Fatos Mero Rrapaj from incoming Cham refugees originating from Parga, Greece. Rrapaj noted that during that time there were a few variants of the song and the one he recorded was with the most and complete lyrics.

Albanian

Ra dielli malës Vigël,
xbriti Çelua në Arilë,
për të shkretën vajrëkimë.
Arilot’, burra dajllarë,
për shqiptarëtë firarë,
ç’e bëtë Çelo Mezanë?
— Në Haxhi Duli ka rarë.
I thot’ Haxhi Duli: — Mirë:
Qëndro, o Çelo të rrimë,
se mos të zënë pusinë!
Po Çelua nëk qéndroi,
bë vajrëkimnë dhe shkoi.
Mu ne pusi i Sulejmanit,
pusi e Çelo Mezanit,
nga di qen të kajmekamit:
Shtien mbi Çelo Mezanë,
Hizra me Sako Budanë.
Mu ne Pusi i Sulejmanit,
seç thirri Çelo Mezani,
— Sako Budan, i pabesë,
o kulishi i kahpesë,
pse s’bëre zë, të të presë?
Martinën në krahë e keshë
me njëqint e një fushekë!
Kur i ra martinë e parë,
Çelua ktheu surranë.
Kur i ra martinë e ditë,
Çelua gremisi sitë.
Kur i ra martinë e tretë,
Çelua ra me të vërtetë.
Di afije, di rrufjanë,
Hizra me Sako Budanë,
tërpëruan Vrahonanë,
Vrahonanë edhe kazanë,
Çamërinë anë e mbanë.
Vanë nanës e i thanë:
— Çelon ta zunë të gjallë,
koshadhet me kajmekamë.
Nana u tha këto fjalë:
— Në kloftë fjal’ e vërtetë,
e kam për ta vrarë vetë!
Prapë nanës kur i thanë:
Çelon tij ta kanë vrarë
«di afije, di rrufjanë»,
Nana u tha këto fjalë:
— Mirë benë që e vranë,
se trimat ashtu e kanë.

English

At sundown on Vigël mountain,
Çelo came down to Arila,
out to offer his condolences.
The men of Arila, all uncles,
for Albanians, outlaws,
what did you do to Çelo Mezani ?
— One Haxhi Duli has hit him.
And Haxhi Duli said: — Good:
Wait, let us sit down oh’ Çelo,
so they won’t seize you by the well!
But Çelo did not stop,
he offered his condolences and went.
By the well of Sulejmani,
was the well of Çelo Mezani,
with two dogs of the kaymekam:
Shot atop Çelo Mezani,
Hizra with Sako Budani.
By the well of Sulejmani,
Çelo Mezani yelled,
— Sako Budani without honour,
oh whelp of a hussy,
why did you not say something, so as to wait?
You had the rifle upon your arm
with a hundred and one bullets!
When the rifle made its first shot,
Çelo turned and looked around.
When the rifle made its second shot,
Çelo folded and closed his eyelids.
When the rifle made its third shot,
Çelo then was truly slaughtered.
Two rats, two panderers,
Hizra with Sako Budani,
Shamed all of Vrahona,
Vrahona and the whole kaza,
Chameria and all around.
They went to his mother and said:
— They seized Çelo alive,
Ottoman soldiers pursuing with the kaymekam.
And the mother said these words:
— It is true what they said,
for now I have to kill him myself!
Behind the mother they said:
Your Çelo they have killed
«two rats, two panderers»,
And the mother replied with these words:
— It is good they killed him,
because that is how the brave have it.

== See also ==
- Cham Albanians
- Music of Albania
- Polyphonic song of Epirus
