= Sitaria, Ioannina =

Sitaria
- Community
- Location within Greece
- Coordinates: 39°52′7″N 20°31′32″E
- Country: Greece
- Administrative region: Epirus
- Regional unit: Ioannina
- Municipality: Pogoni
- Municipal unit: Ano Kalamas
- Elevation: 508 m (1,667 ft)

Population (2021)
  - Community: 96
- Time zone: UTC+2 (EET)
  - Summer (DST): UTC+3 (EEST)

Sitaria (Greek: Σιταριά, before 1927: Μόσιορη, Mosiori) is a settlement in Ioannina regional unit, Epirus, Greece. The village is located in the region of Kourentochoria.

== Name ==
The toponym is derived from the Albanian noun mosh/ë, -a meaning 'age' and the adjectival suffix -sor, whereby the form moshor generated the meaning of 'old, ancient' alongside the nouns fshat, -i or katund, -i 'village', later omitted, which denoted 'old village'.

The Albanian word moshë stems from the older form motsë 'old man, elderly', earlier mot-shë from mot 'time, year', and it is derived from the Indo-European root *me, which is also the basis for the Greek metron and Latin metior. The Albanian word entered Romanian, where moș means 'old' and is rendered in other Balkan Romance languages such as Aromanian, Megleno-Romanian, and Istro-Romanian as moșu and moașa.

== Demographics ==
Some Aromanians settled in the village following the interwar period.

== See also ==
- List of settlements in the Ioannina regional unit
