= Ano Ravenia =

- Community
- Location within Greece
- Coordinates: 39°56′23″N 20°36′16″E
- Country: Greece
- Administrative region: Epirus
- Regional unit: Ioannina
- Municipality: Pogoni
- Municipal unit: Kalpaki
- Elevation: 538 m (1,765 ft)

Population (2021)
  - Community: 130
- Time zone: UTC+2 (EET)
  - Summer (DST): UTC+3 (EEST)

Ano Ravenia (Greek: Άνω Ραβένια) is a settlement in Ioannina regional unit, Epirus, Greece. Traditionally, the village was part of the Zagori region until the construction of the Ioannina–Konitsa road.

== Name ==
In the late 19th century, the scholar Ioannis Lambridis described Ravenia as meaning a 'flat place'. The linguist Max Vasmer derived the toponym from the Old Slavic ravьnъ, meaning a 'flat, level place'. The linguist Kostas Oikonomou derived the placename from the adjectival-possessive ravьnja, a form which stemmed from the Slavic noun ravьnъ, with the possessive suffix -ja, masculine -jъ. The Slavic stressed ь sound was rendered in Greek as e, while the grammatical gender changed from feminine to neuter.

== Demographics ==
The village is inhabited by Greeks. Some Aromanians settled in the village following the interwar period.

== See also ==
- List of settlements in the Ioannina regional unit
