= Chrysorrachi, Ioannina =

Chrysorrachi
- Community
- Location within Greece
- Coordinates: 39°49′47″N 20°36′54″E
- Country: Greece
- Administrative region: Epirus
- Regional unit: Ioannina
- Municipality: Pogoni
- Municipal unit: Kalpaki
- Elevation: 508 m (1,667 ft)

Population (2021)
  - Community: 114
- Time zone: UTC+2 (EET)
  - Summer (DST): UTC+3 (EEST)

Chrysorrachi (Greek: Χρυσορράχη, before 1927: Ζαγόριανη, Zagoriani) is a settlement in Ioannina regional unit, Epirus, Greece. An ancient city citadel is located near the village.

== Name ==
The scholar Ioannis Lambridis described the placename as meaning 'behind the mountain, on the mountain'. The linguist Max Vasmer stated the toponym stems from the Slavic form Zagorjane referring to 'someone who lives behind the forests'. It is derived from the toponym Zagori and the demonstrative suffix -jani which indicates the inhabitants of a place.

== Demographics ==
Some Aromanians settled in the village following the interwar period.

== See also ==
- List of settlements in the Ioannina regional unit
