= Argyrochori, Ioannina =

Argyrochori
- Community
- Location within Greece
- Coordinates: 39°57′7″N 20°21′28″E
- Country: Greece
- Administrative region: Epirus
- Regional unit: Ioannina
- Municipality: Pogoni
- Municipal unit: Delvinaki
- Elevation: 764 m (2,507 ft)

Population (2021)
  - Community: 10
- Time zone: UTC+2 (EET)
  - Summer (DST): UTC+3 (EEST)

Argyrochori (Greek: Αργυροχώρι, before: Γαϊδουροχώρι, Gaidourochori) is a settlement in Ioannina regional unit, Epirus, Greece. The village is part of Lower Pogoni. In the Ottoman era, the location of the village had been shifted twice.

== Name ==
The older name of the village Gaidourochori 'donkey village' is not mentioned in Greek administrative documents. Inhabitants from surrounding villages call the village Gaidourochori in a serious manner, while 19th century scholar Panagiotis Aravantinos used the form Argyrochori; the Orthodox Diocese of Argyrokastro (Gjirokastër) had rendered it as Gaidourochori, and another recorded form is Gadarochori. Linguist Kostas Oikonomou states the form Argyrochori 'silver village' is a later euphemistic name of the village or one which emerged due to the phonetic similarity of the two types.

The toponym is a compound and derived from Greek words gaidaros 'donkey' and -chori, from chorio 'village'. The word gaidaro as the first element indicates the compound is related to the donkey, as it is used in several Greek words about the donkey and aspects of animal husbandry or as a magnifying prefix. In the nomenclature of the village, the placename compound is used with the meaning, 'of the place, of the village', describing where there are many donkeys.

== Demographics ==
Under Ottoman rule the population of Argyrochori were mostly Albanian speaking Muslims, whom local Greeks called "Turks". The term "Turk" was used as a generic term for Muslims during the Ottoman period. In the early 21st century, Aromanians reside in certain neighbourhoods and constitute a segment of the village population.

== See also ==
- List of settlements in the Ioannina regional unit

== Sources ==
- Green, Sarah (2005). Notes from the Balkans: Locating Marginality and Ambiguity on the Greek–Albanian Border. Princeton University Press. ISBN 9781400884353.
