= Monastery of Panagia Molyvdoskepastos =

Male Greek Orthodox monastery

- Ιερά Μονή Παναγίας Μολυβδοσκέπαστης
- Location within Greece
- Interactive map of Monastery of Panagia Molyvdoskepastos

Monastery information
- Established: 7th century
- Dedication: Panagia
- Diocese: Metropolis of Dryinoupolis, Pogoniani and Konitsa
- Controlled churches: Monastery of Saint Christopher, Monastery of Saints Constantine and Helena

People
- Founder: Emperor Constantine IV Pogonatus (668-685)

Site
- Location: Konitsa, Greece
- Coordinates: 40.06585°N 20.58635°E
- Public access: yes
- Other information: The monastery is open to visitors from dawn to sunset daily all year round, except on Wednesdays. On Fridays, it is open after 12 p.m.
- Website: monastiriakonitsis.gr

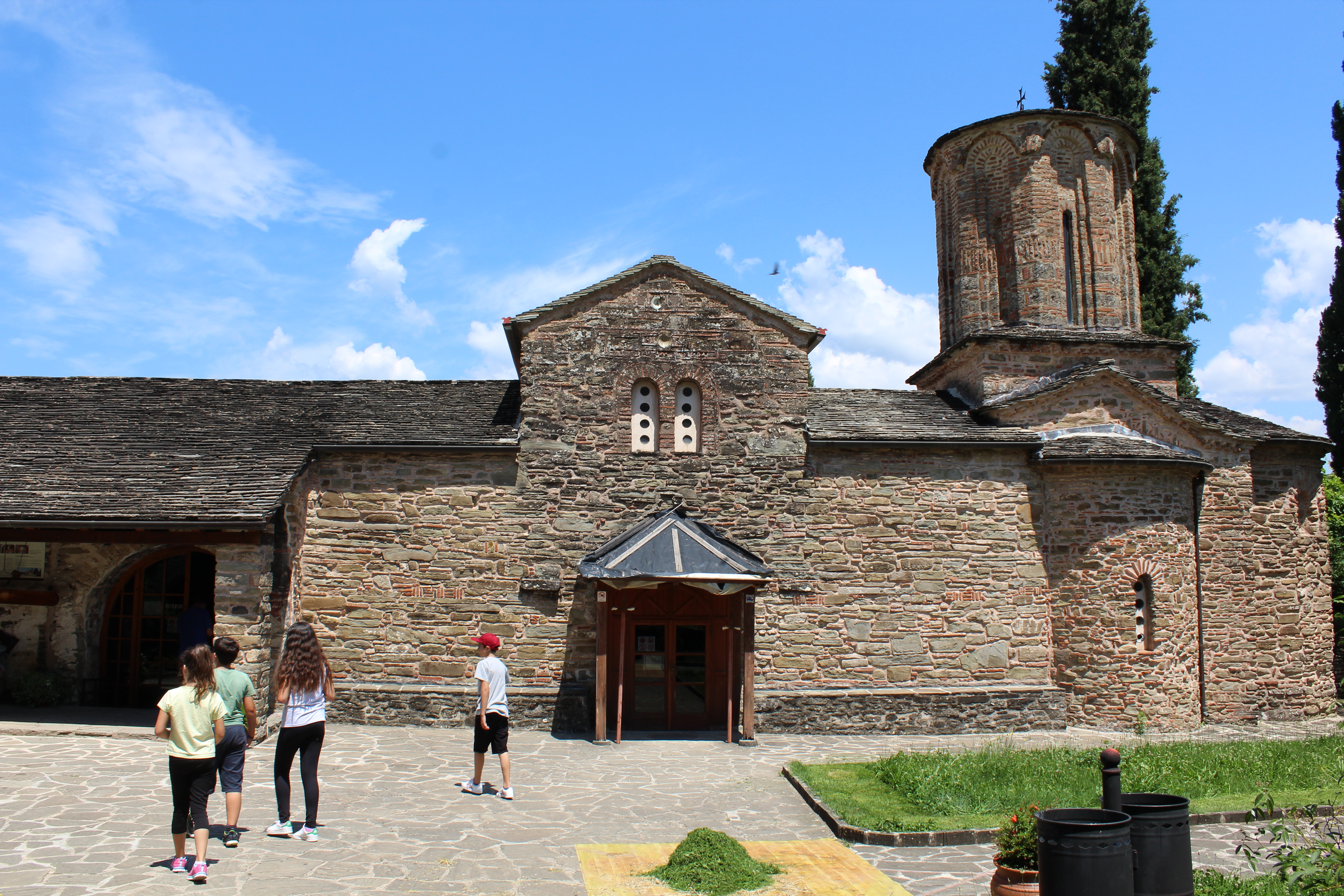
Molyvdoskepasti 1.jpg

The Monastery of Panagia Molyvdoskepastos (Greek: Ιερά Μονή Παναγίας Μολυβδοσκέπαστης) is a male Greek Orthodox monastery at Molyvdoskepastos, near Konitsa, Epirus, in North Western Greece.

== Location ==
The Patriarchal and Stauropegic Monastery of Molyvdoskepastos is located in the Ioannina Prefecture near the town of Konitsa. The monastery is 55 km from Ioannina and 20 km from Konitsa. It is located just a few hundred meters from the Greek–Albanian border and 400 meters from the confluence of the Aoos and the Sarantaporos rivers, at the foot of mount Meropi-Nemertsika. Its unique setting together with its long history makes this monasterial complex one of the most prestigious monuments in the wider region of Epirus and a point of reference for Greek history.

== History ==
According to an inscription of 1561, the monastery was founded in the 7th century by Emperor Constantine Pogonatos (r. 641–668), to whom the establishment of the Archbishopric of Pogoniani is also attributed. While the seat of the archbishop was indeed at Molyvdoskepastos (then known as Depalitsa or Dipalitsa), the diocese first appears in the Notitiae Episcopatuum during the reign of Andronikos III Palaiologos (r. 1328–1341). Furthermore, the earliest remains in the area date to no earlier than the 11th century (ruined church of St. Demetrios), and the catholicon of the monastery dates to the 13th/14th century.

During Ottoman rule, the monastery was a spiritual, cultural, and economic center of the area. Indicatively, in the 14th century a school for scribes was set up in which priest-teachers taught the art of transcription of manuscripts to monks and lay people. It is noteworthy that many scholars and writers of the time graduated from this school. The monastery had large dependencies (metochia) in the Danubian Principalities. Outside its walls, to the northwest, there was a large commercial center the so called, even today, Pazari area, which assisted the monastery’s finances.

After 1913 the monastery remained without monks, its properties were encroached and its holy artifacts and relics were stolen. In 1943, when the area was bombarded by the Nazis, it was almost razed to the ground. The cells and the archive were burnt down and the catholicon was plundered. In 1988 the monastery was manned once more by the present day brotherhood with the encouragement and guidance of the recently canonized Saint Paisios the Athonite and the blessings of the late Metropolitan Sebastianos.

== Architecture of the Catholicon ==
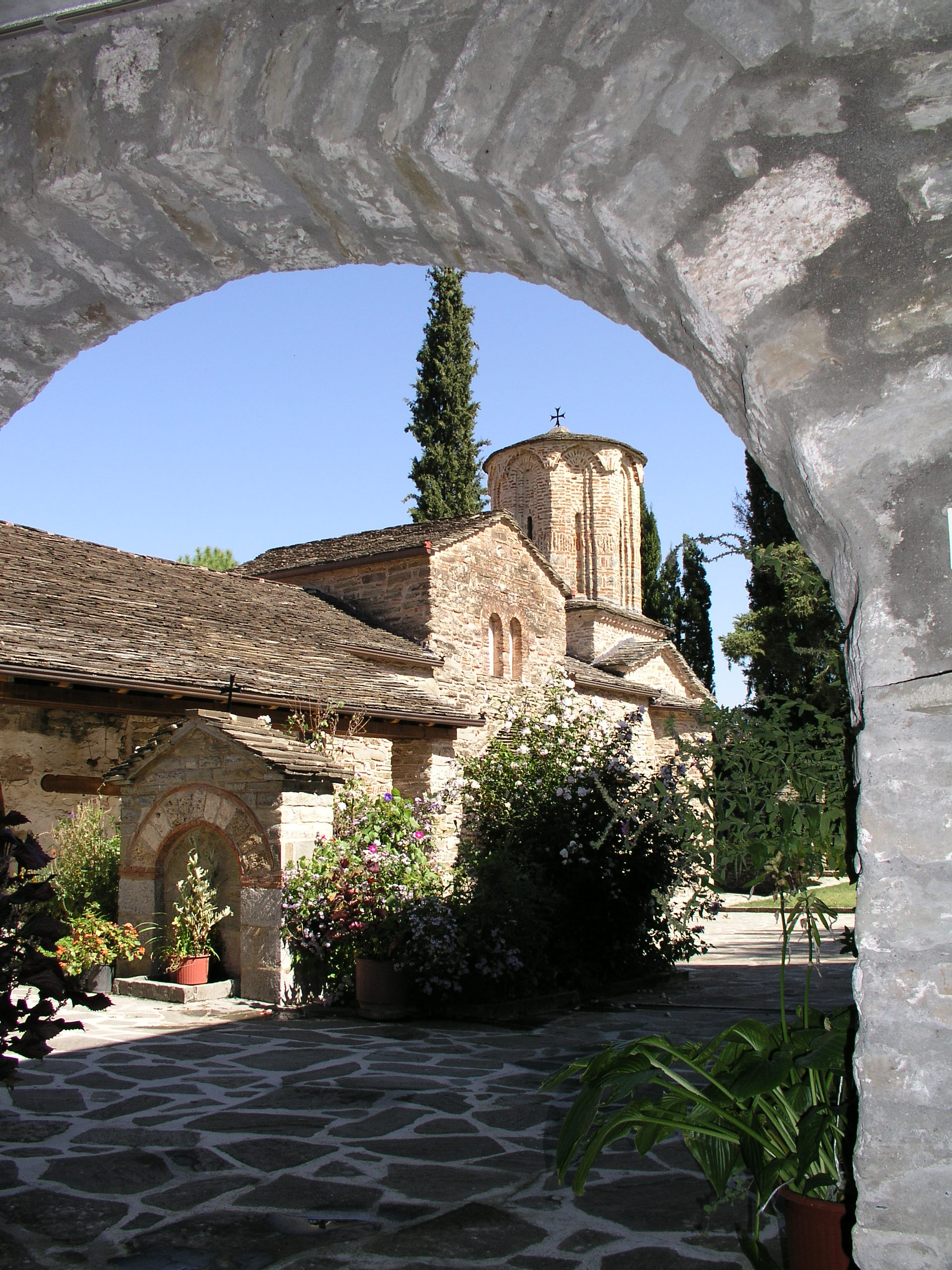
Panagia Molyvdoskepastos

The catholicon of the monastery features a unique architectural style which evolved with the gradual increase of the Monastery’s needs, both liturgical and practical. This architectural particularity also appears in the way the iconographic cycles were organized on the church walls. The original catholicon, according to an inscription attributed to its founder, was built by the Emperor Constantine Pogonatos. More specifically, the existing catholicon underwent three architectural phases of modification.

- 1st phase: During the 11th and 12th centuries the original church was rebuilt into a small cross–plan church with three vaults and a dome.
- 2nd phase: At the end of the 13th century and in the beginning of the 14th the middle cross vaulted section was added by the megas doux Andronikos Komnenos Palaiologos. At about the same time two chapels were added: that of old Timios Prodromos (Saint John the Baptist) in the south, and Agia Paraskevi (Saint Paraskevi) in the north.
- 3rd phase: Around the year 1521 inhabitants of the nearby village old Pogoniani carried out renovations to the catholicon and added a large narthex (the Lite) consisting of three parts.

== Frescoes of the catholicon ==
The existing frescoes of the catholicon are in some places in three successive layers: one Byzantine and two post – Byzantine. The older frescos of the church date back to the beginning of the 14th century. Two iconographers of different styles but of the same technique can be distinguished probably belonging to the same workshop. The catholicon was painted once more in 1521-2 covering over parts of the original Byzantine frescoes by an iconographer who apparently wanted to remain anonymous as he characteristically signs “God knows whose all this labour was”. Nowadays both layers, although overlapping, can be discerned in the lower parts of the western wing of the cross- vaulted section.

In 1537, after extensive damage, possibly from an earthquake, architectural parts were added to the Naive (enlargement of arches, columns, etc) and it was decorated anew by Eustathios Iakovou, a protonotarios from Arta, whose signature appears on the hagiography of the historical chapel of the monastery of Mavriotissa in Kastoria.

== Miracle-Working Icon of Panagia Molyvdoskepastos ==
The monastery houses a "miracle-working" icon of the Panagia. The creation of the icon is unknown. After being stolen and left exposed to weather, it suffered great damage. The rotten parts were cut off and it was retouched in parts. There are historical references to a number of thefts of the icon as well as its subsequent return to the monastery.

== Sources ==
- http://www.religiousgreece.gr/web/guest/monasteria/-/asset_publisher/0bMEUXPQRK0A/content/iera-mone-panagias-molybdoskepastou-konitsa
- Nicol, Donald (1953). "The Churches of Molyvdoskepastos". The Annual of the British School at Athens. 48: 141–153. doi:10.1017/S0068245400012508. JSTOR 30096968. S2CID 180537356.
- http://www.konitsa-cradle.gr/en/listing/holy-monastery-of-molyvdoskepastos/
- https://ecotourism-greece.com/attractions/molyvdoskepastos-monastery/
- http://www.greece.com/destinations/Epirus/Ioannina/Village/Molyvdoskepastos.html
- https://www.gtp.gr/TDirectoryDetails.asp?id=17378
