= Lavdani =

Lavdani Λάβδανη
- Municipal unit
- Location within the regional unit

- Location within Greece
- Coordinates: 39°49′N 20°31′E
- Country: Greece
- Administrative region: Epirus
- Regional unit: Ioannina
- Municipality: Pogoni

Area
  - Municipal unit: 48.191 km^{2} (18.607 sq mi)
  - Community: 31.866 km^{2} (12.304 sq mi)

Population (2021)
  - Municipal unit: 119
  - Municipal unit density: 2.47/km^{2} (6.40/sq mi)
  - Community: 64
  - Community density: 2.0/km^{2} (5.2/sq mi)
- Time zone: UTC+2 (EET)
  - Summer (DST): UTC+3 (EEST)
- Vehicle registration: ΙΝ

Lavdani (Greek: Λάβδανη) is a village and a former community in the Ioannina regional unit, Epirus, Greece. Since the 2011 local government reform it is part of the municipality Pogoni, of which it is a municipal unit. The municipal unit has an area of 48.191 km^{2}, the community 31.866 km^{2}. Population 119 (2021). The community consists of the villages Lavdani, Kato Lavdani and Vristovo.

== Notable people ==
- Spyridon Simos, journalist and politician
