= Kato Meropi =

- Community
- Location within Greece
- Coordinates: 40°1′8″N 20°31′18″E
- Country: Greece
- Administrative region: Epirus
- Regional unit: Ioannina
- Municipality: Pogoni
- Municipal unit: Ano Pogoni
- Elevation: 764 m (2,507 ft)

Population (2021)
  - Community: 49
- Time zone: UTC+2 (EET)
  - Summer (DST): UTC+3 (EEST)

Kato Meropi (Greek: Μερόπη, before 1928: Φραστανά, Frastana) is a settlement in Ioannina regional unit, Epirus, Greece.

== Name ==
Frastana was used as the name for a village in Pogoni, while in the 14th century, the toponym was rendered in Greek as Freastana (modern Kyparissia) for another village located in Greek Epirus. The toponym is derived from the old Slavic word hvrastъ, earlier chvorstъ meaning 'bush, thicket, undergrowth (Pinus mugo) or oak'. It is formed with the addition of either the adjectival suffix -ьna or the ending -ina used to form toponyms indicating a place where plants mentioned in the subject grow. The initial f- stems from the consonant complex hv, a variation common in Bulgarian dialects. Phonetic changes occurred where the e, stemming from the Slavic ь or i, shifted to a through Greek vowel assimilation, whereby a-i (e) -a became a-a-a. The oxytone form Frastana is analogous to Greek affixes in -iana.

== Demographics ==
Some Aromanians settled in the village following the interwar period.

== See also ==
- List of settlements in the Ioannina regional unit
