= Drymades, Ioannina =

Village in Ioannina, Greece

Drymades Δρυμάδες
- Community
- Location within Greece
- Coordinates: 40°03′40″N 20°26′24″E
- Country: Greece
- Administrative region: Epirus
- Regional unit: Ioannina
- Municipality: Pogoni
- Municipal unit: Pogoniani

Population (2021)
  - Community: 27
- Time zone: UTC+2 (EET)
  - Summer (DST): UTC+3 (EEST)

Drymades (Greek: Δρυμάδες) is a village in the regional unit of Ioannina in the Epirus region of Greece. It is part of the municipality of Pogoni. It is near the border with Albania.
