= Molyvdoskepastos =

Village in Epirus, Greece

Molyvdoskepastos Μολυβδοσκέπαστος
- Community
- Location within Greece
- Coordinates: 40°3′46″N 20°34′14″E
- Country: Greece
- Administrative region: Epirus
- Regional unit: Ioannina
- Municipality: Konitsa
- Municipal unit: Konitsa
- Elevation: 501 m (1,644 ft)

Population (2021)
  - Community: 45
- Time zone: UTC+2 (EET)
  - Summer (DST): UTC+3 (EEST)

Molyvdoskepastos (Greek: Μολυβδοσκέπαστος, lit. 'Lead–covered', before 1929: Δεπαλίτσα, Depalitsa) is a village located in the municipality of Konitsa, in the Ioannina regional unit, Epirus, Greece. It has a population of 45 people (2021) and is the birthplace of former Greek President Karolos Papoulias. Although traditionally included in the historical region of Pogoni, it is not a part of the municipality of Pogoni.

The village is located on the eastern side of Mt. Dousko, on the left bank of the Aoos river, and is 1.5km west-southwest from its confluence with the Sarantaporos river.

== Name ==
The village is recorded as Dipalitza in the chronicle of Mount Athos (1585), while in the 19th century the scholar Panagiotis Aravantinos used the same form, and the scholar Ioannis Lambridis wrote it as Dipalitsa and described it as meaning 'water mill'.

The linguist Kostas Oikonomou stated the toponym is Albanian, a compound derived from the Albanian numeral dy 'two' and the appellative palic/ë, -a. This comes from the noun pal/ë, -a meaning 'aspect, district, side' and is combined with the Albanian diminutive suffix -icë and -ica, which stems from the Slavic -ica, while the Albanian y became i in Greek. In this toponym, the word pal/ë, -a is used as a geographical term. The village was renamed after the Monastery of Panagia Molyvdoskepastos.
