= Ano Pogoni =

Ano Pogoni Άνω Πωγώνι
- Municipal unit
- Location within the regional unit

- Location within Greece
- Coordinates: 40°1′N 20°34′E
- Country: Greece
- Administrative region: Epirus
- Regional unit: Ioannina
- Municipality: Pogoni

Area
  - Municipal unit: 137.084 km^{2} (52.928 sq mi)
- Elevation: 650 m (2,130 ft)

Population (2021)
  - Municipal unit: 1,067
  - Municipal unit density: 7.784/km^{2} (20.16/sq mi)
- Time zone: UTC+2 (EET)
  - Summer (DST): UTC+3 (EEST)
- Postal code: 440 06
- Area code: 26570
- Vehicle registration: ΙΝ

Ano Pogoni (Greek: Άνω Πωγώνι) is a former municipality in the Ioannina regional unit, Epirus, Greece. Since the 2011 local government reform it is part of the municipality Pogoni, of which it is a municipal unit. The municipal unit has an area of 137.084 km^{2}. The seat of the municipality was in Kefalovryso.

== Subdivisions ==
The municipal unit Ano Pogoni is subdivided into the following communities (constituent villages in brackets):

- Agios Kosmas
- Kakolakkos
- Kato Meropi
- Kefalovryso
- Meropi (formerly Roumpates)
- Oraiokastro
- Palaiopyrgos
- Roupsia
- Vasiliko

== Population ==
Historical population
Year	Pop.	±%
1991	2,108	—
2001	1,398	−33.7%
2011	1,490	+6.6%
2021	1,067	−28.4%

== Names ==
The name Ano Pogoni means "Upper Pogoni". Some Albanian toponyms exist for names of villages in the Pogoni area such as Roumpates meaning robe or garment.

== History ==
During the Balkan Wars (autumn 1912) a number of villages in the area were affected by raids of Muslim bands. At the end of the Balkan Wars most of the Pogoni area became part Greece, while six villages (Lower Pogoni) were ceded to the newly established Principality of Albania.
