= Delvin (name) =

Delvin is both a given name and surname. Notable people with the name include:

- Delvin Breaux (born 1989), American football player
- Delvin Brown (born 1979), American football defensive back
- Delvin Countess (born 1982), American soccer player
- Delvin Pinheiro Frederico (born 1995), Dutch professional footballer
- Delvin Goh (born 1995), Singaporean basketball player
- Delvin Lamar Hughley (born 1978), American football player
- Delvin James (born 1978), American football player
- Delvin Joyce (born 1978), American football player
- Delvin Miller (1913–1996), harness racing driver, trainer, and owner
- Delvin Myles (born 1972), American football player
- Delvin N'Dinga (born 1988), Congolese footballer
- Delvin Pérez (born 1998), Puerto Rican baseball infielder
- Delvin Rodríguez (born 1980), Dominican boxer
- Delvin Rumbino (born 1995), Indonesian footballer
- Delvin Thoma (born 1983), Nauruan politician
- Delvin Williams (born 1951), American football player
- Jean Delvin (1853–1922), Belgian painter
- Jerome Delvin (born 1956), American politician
