= Petroloukas Chalkias =

Greek traditional musician (1934–2025)

- Πετρολούκας Χαλκιάς
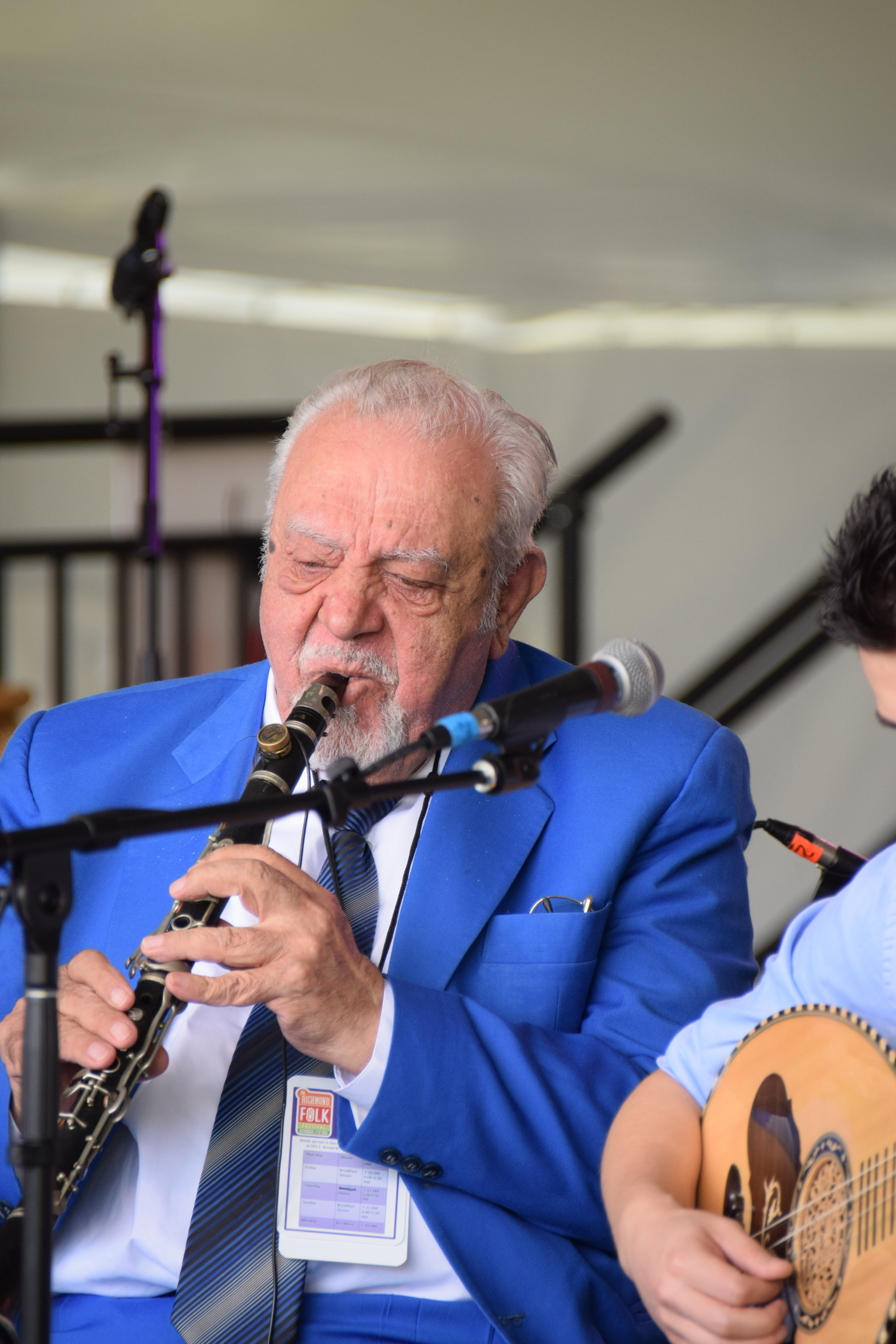
- Chalkias performing in 2019
- Born: 27 July 1934; Delvinaki, Epirus, Greece
- Died: 15 June 2025 (aged 90)
- Occupation: Traditional musician
- Years active: 1945–2025

Petroloukas Chalkias (Greek: Πετρολούκας Χαλκιάς; 27 July 1934 – 15 June 2025) was a Greek traditional musician.

== Life and career ==
Chalkias was born on 27 July 1934 in Delvinaki and his father was a clarinetist. Chalkias was of Romani origin. He began his involvement with the clarinet at the age of 11, despite the refusal of his father, with whose help he made his first public appearance at that age. After this event he went to Athens where he played with his father and his violinist brother Achilleas (1937–2015) and where he made his first radio appearance.

In 1960, he emigrated to the United States where he stayed for 20 years and spread Greek traditional music.

In 1979, he returned to Greece and settled in Athens. He played in well-known music centers and concerts, appeared in radio and television shows and participated in recordings and albums with well-known artists.

Chalkias died on 15 June 2025, at the age of 90.
