= Vasiliko, Ioannina =

Vasiliko Βασιλικό
- Community
- Location within Greece
- Coordinates: 40°1′N 20°36′E
- Country: Greece
- Administrative region: Epirus
- Regional unit: Ioannina
- Municipality: Pogoni
- Municipal unit: Ano Pogoni

Population (2021)
  - Community: 161
- Time zone: UTC+2 (EET)
  - Summer (DST): UTC+3 (EEST)
- Vehicle registration: ΙΝ

Vasiliko (Greek: Βασιλικό, before 1928: Τσαραπλανά, Tsaraplana) is a village in the municipality of Pogoni, Ioannina regional unit, Epirus, Greece. It is situated at an altitude of 800 m. It is 3 km east of Kefalovryso, 13 km west of Konitsa, 16 km south of Leskovik (Albania) and 44 km northwest of Ioannina.

== Name ==
The toponym is formed from the Slavic nouns cerъ, genitive cera, from Latin cerrus meaning 'oak' and planina 'mountain, hill'. The toponym emerged as Tseraplanina and later became Tsaraplana through the vowel assimilation of the sounds e-a into a-a and the syllabic dissimilation of -ni-. According to locals, the placename is derived from the Slavic word carь, a term used for Russian, Ottoman and medieval Bulgarian heads of state. The linguist Kostas Oikonomou stated that this view is of a later origin, as the mistaken association with the word carь led to the village being officially renamed Vasiliko 'royal' in Greek, a name change which preserved and strengthened the tradition.

== Demographics ==
Historical population
Year	Pop.	±%
1981	507	—
1991	416	−17.9%
2001	259	−37.7%
2011	228	−12.0%
2021	161	−29.4%

Part of the village population are Aromanian speakers. In the early 21st century, elderly people were bilingual in the community language and Greek, whereas younger residents under 40 might have understood the community language but did not use it.

== Notable people ==
- Athenagoras I (1886–1972) – Patriarch of Constantinople

== See also ==
- List of settlements in the Ioannina regional unit
