= Georgios Halkias =

Greek scholar

Georgios T. Halkias (born June 6, 1967) is a Greek scholar of Oriental Studies with publications on Tibetan Buddhism, Himalayan regions, and cross-cultural contacts between Hellenism and Buddhism. He is currently an associate professor of Buddhist Studies at the University of Hong Kong. and co-editor in chief of the Oxford Encyclopedia of Buddhism

== Education ==
Halkias was born in Athens, Greece, and studied for his B.A. and M.A. in Western and Asian philosophy at the University of Hawaiʻi at Mānoa. He received in 2006 his DPhil in Oriental studies at the Faculty of Oriental Studies, Oxford, where he is currently a visiting associate researcher.

== Selected publications ==
=== Books and Edited Volumes ===
- Luminous Bliss: A Religious History of Pure Land Literature in Tibet. With an Annotated Translation and Critical Analysis of the Orgyen-ling golden short Sukhāvatīvyūha-sūtra. University of Hawai‘i Press, 2013. Paperback edition 2017.
- Pure Lands in Asian Texts and Contexts: An Anthology. University of Hawaiʻi Press, 2019.
- Religious Boundaries for Sex, Gender, and Corporeality. Routledge, 2018.
- Contemporary Visions in Tibetan Studies: Proceedings of the First International Seminar of Young Tibetologists SOAS, London 2007. Serindia Press, 2007.

=== Articles ===
- Śrī Siṃha’s Final Upadeśa: Seven Nails that Strike the Essence of Awakening." In Illuminating the Dharma: Buddhist Studies in Honour of Venerable Professor KL Dhammajoti, ed. Toshiichi Endo. Centre of Buddhist Studies, The University of Hong Kong, pages 181-194, 2021.
- "Yavanayāna: Scepticism as Soteriology in Aristocle's Passage." In Buddhism and Skepticism: Historical, Philosophical, and Comparative Perspectives, ed. Oren Hanner. Hamburg Buddhist Studies Series 13, University of Hamburg, pages 83–108, 2020.
- "The Heritage Buddhist Manuscripts of Ladakh: Tibetan Buddhist Canons and the Perfection of Wisdom Sūtras." Himalaya Journal, Volume 39, Number 2, pages 1–9, 2019.
- "Buddhist Meditation in Tibet: Exoteric and Esoteric Orientations." In Oxford Handbook of Meditation, eds. Miguel Farias, et al. Oxford University Press, pages 1–27, 2019.
- "Heavenly Ascents after Death: Karma Chagme’s Commentary on Mind Transference." Revue d'Études Tibétaines, no. 52, pages 70–89, 2019.
- "Great Journeys in Little Spaces: Buddhist Matters in Khyentse Norbu’s Travellers and Magicians." International Journal of Buddhist Thought and Culture, Volume 28, Number 2, pages 205–223, 2018.
- "A History Worth Remembering: An Expedition to the Fortress of Basgo." Orientations, Volume 48, Number 2, 150–155, 2017.
- "The Mirror and the Palimpsest: The Myth of Buddhist Kingship in Imperial Tibet." In Locating Religions: Contact, Diversity and Translocality, eds. Reinhold F. Glei and Nikolas Jaspert. Brill, pages 123–150, 2017.
- "The Self-immolation of Kalanos and other Luminous Encounters among Greeks and Indian Buddhists in the Hellenistic world." Journal of the Oxford Centre for Buddhist Studies, Volume VIII, pages 163–186, 2015.
- “Fire Rituals in the Tibetan Tengyur: The Aparimitāyur-homa-vidhi-nāma by the Queen of Siddhas.” In Homa Variations: The Study of Ritual Change across the Longue Durée, eds. R. Payne and M. Witzel. Oxford University Press, pages 225–245, 2015.
- "When the Greeks Converted the Buddha: Asymmetrical Transfers of Knowledge in Indo-Greek Cultures." In Religions and Trade: Religious Formation, Transformation and Cross-Cultural Exchange between East and West, ed. Volker Rabens. Brill, pages 65–115, 2013.
- "The Enlightened Sovereign: Kingship and Buddhism in Indo-Tibetan Traditions." In A Companion to Buddhist Philosophy, ed. Steven Emmanuel. John Wiley & Sons, pages 491–511, 2013.
- "The Muslim Queens of the Himalayas: Princess Exchange in Ladakh and Baltistan." In Islam-Tibet: Interactions along the Musk Routes, eds. Anna Akasoy et al. Ashgate Publications, pages 231–252, 2010.
- "Until the Feathers of the Winged Black Raven Turn White: Sources for the Tibet-Bashahr Treaty of 1679–1684." In Mountains, Monasteries and Mosques: Recent Research on Ladakh and the Western Himalaya, eds. John Bray et al. Supplement to Rivista Degli Studi Orientali, Nuova Serie, Volume LXXX, pages 61–86, 2009.
- "Pure-Lands and other Visions in Seventeenth-Century Tibet: a Gnam-chos sādhana for the pure-land Sukhāvatī revealed in 1658 by Gnam-chos Mi-'gyur-rdo-rje (1645–1667)." In Power, Politics and the Reinvention of Tradition: Tibet in the Seventeenth and Eighteenth Century, eds. Brian Cuevas et al. Brill, pages 121–151, 2006.
- "Tibetan Buddhism Registered: Imperial Archives from the Palace-Temple of 'Phang-thang." The Eastern Buddhist, Kyoto. Volume XXXVI, Numbers 1 and 2, pages 46–105, 2004.
