= Delvino, Kardzhali Province =

Delvino Делвино
- Village
- Location within Bulgaria
- Coordinates: 41.3833°N 25.4833°E
- Country: Bulgaria
- Province: Kardzhali Province
- Municipality: Kirkovo
- Time zone: UTC+2 (EET)
  - Summer (DST): UTC+3 (EEST)

Delvino is a village in Kirkovo Municipality, Kardzhali Province, southern Bulgaria.
