= Delvino, Blagoevgrad Province =

Delvino Делвино
- Village
- Location within Bulgaria
- Coordinates: 42°1′N 23°8′E
- Country: Bulgaria
- Province: Blagoevgrad Province
- Municipality: Blagoevgrad

Government
  - Suffragan Mayor: Lyuben Parashkanski

Area
  - Total: 6.912 km^{2} (2.669 sq mi)
- Elevation: 694 m (2,277 ft)

Population (15 December 2010)
  - Total: 66
- GRAO
- Time zone: UTC+2 (EET)
  - Summer (DST): UTC+3 (EEST)
- Postal Code: 2728
- Area code: 073

Delvino is a sparsely populated village in Blagoevgrad Municipality, in Blagoevgrad Province, Bulgaria. It is situated in Rila mountain few kilometers east of Blagoevgrad.
