= Delvinaki =

Delvinaki Δελβινάκι
- Municipal unit
- Location within the regional unit

- Location within Greece
- Coordinates: 39°56′N 20°28′E
- Country: Greece
- Administrative region: Epirus
- Regional unit: Ioannina
- Municipality: Pogoni
- Districts: 17

Area
  - Municipal unit: 255.835 km^{2} (98.778 sq mi)
  - Community: 54.824 km^{2} (21.168 sq mi)

Population (2021)
  - Municipal unit: 1,609
  - Municipal unit density: 6.289/km^{2} (16.29/sq mi)
  - Community: 538
  - Community density: 9.81/km^{2} (25.4/sq mi)
- Time zone: UTC+2 (EET)
  - Summer (DST): UTC+3 (EEST)
- Postal code: 440 04
- Vehicle registration: IN

Delvinaki (Greek: Δελβινάκι) is a former municipality in the Ioannina regional unit, Epirus, Greece. Since the 2011 local government reform, it is part of the municipality Pogoni, of which it is a municipal unit. The municipal unit has an area of 255.8 km^{2}, the community 54.8 km^{2}. In 2021 its population was 538 for the village and 1,609 for the municipal unit. Delvinaki is part of the traditional area of Pogoni.

Delvinaki lies along the EO22 road, currently part of European route E853, which links Kalpaki with the Albanian border. The border crossing Kakavia is west of town. The town of Delvinaki is located in a valley bordered by hills with grazing lands and is a regional government administrative centre.

== Subdivisions ==
The municipal unit of Delvinaki is subdivided into the following communities (constituent villages in brackets):

- Agia Marina
- Argyrochori
- Charavgi
- Delvinaki
- Farangi (formerly Gouveri)
- Kastani
- Kerasovo
- Kryoneri
- Ktismata (Ktismata, Neochori)
- Limni
- Mavropoulo (Mavropoulo, Zavrocho, Chrysodouli)
- Oreino Xirovaltou (Oreino, Xirovaltos)
- Peristeri
- Pontikates
- Stratinista
- Teriachi (Teriachi, Stavrodromi)
- Vissani

== Etymology ==
According to linguist Konstantinos Oikonomou, Delvinaki is a Greek formation and derives from the toponym Delvino, with the Greek diminutive suffix ‑aki added to it; probably in order to differentiate it from the neighboring settlement of Delvinë. Furthermore, Oikonomou and Phaedon Malingoudis presented Delvino as deriving from the Slavic noun dьlva (Proto-Slavic *dьly) 'cauldron, pot', which is used in toponyms to denote a 'valley' or 'basin', and the Slavic suffix ‑ьnъ; the ь of the first syllable, denoting /ĭ/, was rendered as /e/ in Greek. Compare to the toponym Δηλίβινον, first attested in 996 northeast of Polygyros (Chalkidiki) in Greece, Delvino in southern Albania, as well as Delvino (Blagoevgrad Province) and Delvino (Kardzhali Province) in Bulgaria.

According to historians Konstantinos Vakalopoulos and Nikos Yfantis, Delvinaki derives from Albanian and means 'place of vineyards'.

== History ==
From the 14th century to the beginning of Ottoman rule, Delvinaki was among the thriving settlements of the region together with nearby Dipalitsa, Kastaniani and Poliçan. The town was an important commercial centre during the Ottoman period. The church of the Dormition of the Theotokos in Delvinaki was erected in 1619.

Delvinaki was described by Ottoman traveler Evliya Çelebi in the late 17th century as a wealthy town of Pogoni with 400 houses, 6000 fertile vineyards, 40–50 shops, 10 churches and 3 inns. Governed by a voivode, the town was the hass (revenue estate) of an Ottoman admiral; its privileges exempted it from taxes and imperial interference. In the early 19th century, European travellers such as John Cam Hobhouse stated Delvinaki had 300 dwellings and Henry Holland wrote the inhabitants of Delvinaki paid a yearly sum of 140,000 piastres to the Ottoman sultan.

Delvinaki joined Greece after the Balkan Wars of 1913.

Under Greece and prior to the Second World War, Pogoniani was the main trading and administrative centre and Delvinaki was a smaller regional centre due to its central position of the wider transhumant grazing area. After the Albanian border was closed, Pogoniani lost its prominence and Delvinaki replaced it as the regional trading and administrative centre, a shift facilitated by its close proximity to the main road.

== Demographics ==
Year	Village population	Municipal unit population
1981	884	-
1991	922	-
2001	751	2,933
2011	772	2,540
2021	538	1,609

Albanians settled in Pogoni during the first decades of the 14th century and traces of their presence are found in several local toponyms. In 1670, Ottoman traveler Evliya Çelebi visited Delvinaki and wrote it was populated by non-Muslim Albanians. Over time, the Albanian presence was assimilated by the Greeks of Pogoni and hellenised.

In the late Ottoman period, several European travellers of the early 19th century wrote that the area north of Delvinaki represented a different country, reflecting the change in language and customs. Among those was Hobhouse (1813), who said locals described Delvinaki as the starting point of Albania, the homeland of Albanians. He wrote the area marked a transition in language from Greek to Albanian, and in dress from Greek woollen brogues to the Albanian kamisa and kilt. Hobhouse stated Delvinaki was inhabited by Greeks, while Holland wrote the town had 3000 inhabitants.

In Greece, the Greek population of the village become a minority following the settlement of other population groups. Aromanians who practised transhumance pastorialism used Delvinaki as an important temporary stopover in the summer for grazing herds. Following the interwar period, Aromanians settled in Delvinaki after the decline of transhumance pastorialism and form the majority of the modern population.

Several long-term Romani families reside in the village, some of whom are prominent musicians in the region. The Roma of Delvinaki are monolingual Greek speakers. Pastoralist Sarakatsani used to graze animals in Delvinaki and a few later settled in the town following the closure of the Albanian border. By 1997, 15 families from Albania numbering 60 people who called themselves Northern Epirots lived in the village. In the early 21st century, some families who self identified as Albanians settled in Delvinaki.

== Culture ==
Delvinaki is home to Greek polyphonic singing and has a reach music tradition in the wider Pogoni region. It is one of the two main centres of folk music of Pogoni, the other being Parakalamos. An annual festival of polyphonic singing is held in August.

== Notable people ==
- Petroloukas Chalkias, musician
- Hatzimichalis Dalianis, revolutionary leader in Greek War of Independence
- Evangelos Psimmas (1905–1962), bishop of Ermoupoli
- Konstantinos Iroklis Vasiadis (1821–1890), scholar

== See also ==
- List of settlements in the Ioannina regional unit
