= Polyphonic song of Epirus =

Folk musical style from Albania and Greece

The polyphonic song of Epirus is a form of traditional folk polyphony practiced among Albanians, Aromanians, Greeks and ethnic Macedonians in southern Albania and northwestern Greece. The polyphonic song of Epirus is not to be confused with other varieties of polyphonic singing, such as the yodeling songs of the region of Muotatal, or the Cantu a tenore of Sardinia. Scholars consider it an old tradition, which either originates from the ancient Greek and Thraco-Illyrian era, or the Byzantine era, with influences from Byzantine music. The Albanian Iso-Polyphony – which is recognized as cultural heritage by UNESCO – is considered to have its roots in the many-voiced vajtim, the southern Albanian traditional lamentation of the dead. The Greek project Polyphonic Caravan, which aims at researching, safeguarding and promoting the Epirus polyphonic song since 1998, was inscribed in the UNESCO Intangible Cultural Heritage List of Good Safeguarding Practices in 2020.

== Polyphonic Music in Greece and Albania ==
=== In Greece ===
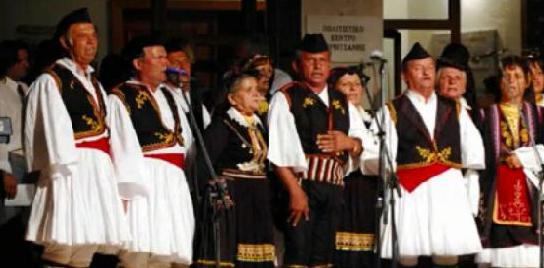
Greek polyphonic group from Dropull wearing skoufos and fustanella

Among Greeks, polyphonic song is found in the northern part of the Greek region of Ioannina; in Ano Pogoni, (Ktismata, Dolo, Parakalamos) and some villages north of Konitsa), as well as in very few villages in northeastern Thesprotia (Tsamantas, Lias, Vavouri, Povla). Among the Greek minorities in southern Albania, polyphonic singing is performed in the regions of Dropull, Pogon (Kato Pogoni) (Poliçan) and the cities of Delvinë, Himara, Sarandë and Gjirokastër.

Greek polyphonic groups can include six different parts: taker (partis), turner (gyristis), spinner (klostis), isokrates, rihtis (the one who "drops" the voice) and foreteller (prologistis). Songs are performed in two (taker and turner or taker and isokrates), three, four or five voices. In five-voice singing all parts are present, while the role of the spinner and the rihtis is performed by one part. The main voice, the taker, can be sung either by men or women, but it can also alternate between them. Greek polyphonic groups usually consist of 4 to 12 persons.

Among Greeks a second kind of polyphonic singing differing in maximum roughness is also performed in Karpathos and Pontos.

In 2020, the Polyphonic Caravan, which is a Greek project with the purpose of researching, safeguarding and promoting the Epirus polyphonic song since 1998, was inscribed in the UNESCO Intangible Cultural Heritage List of Good Safeguarding Practices.

=== In Albania ===
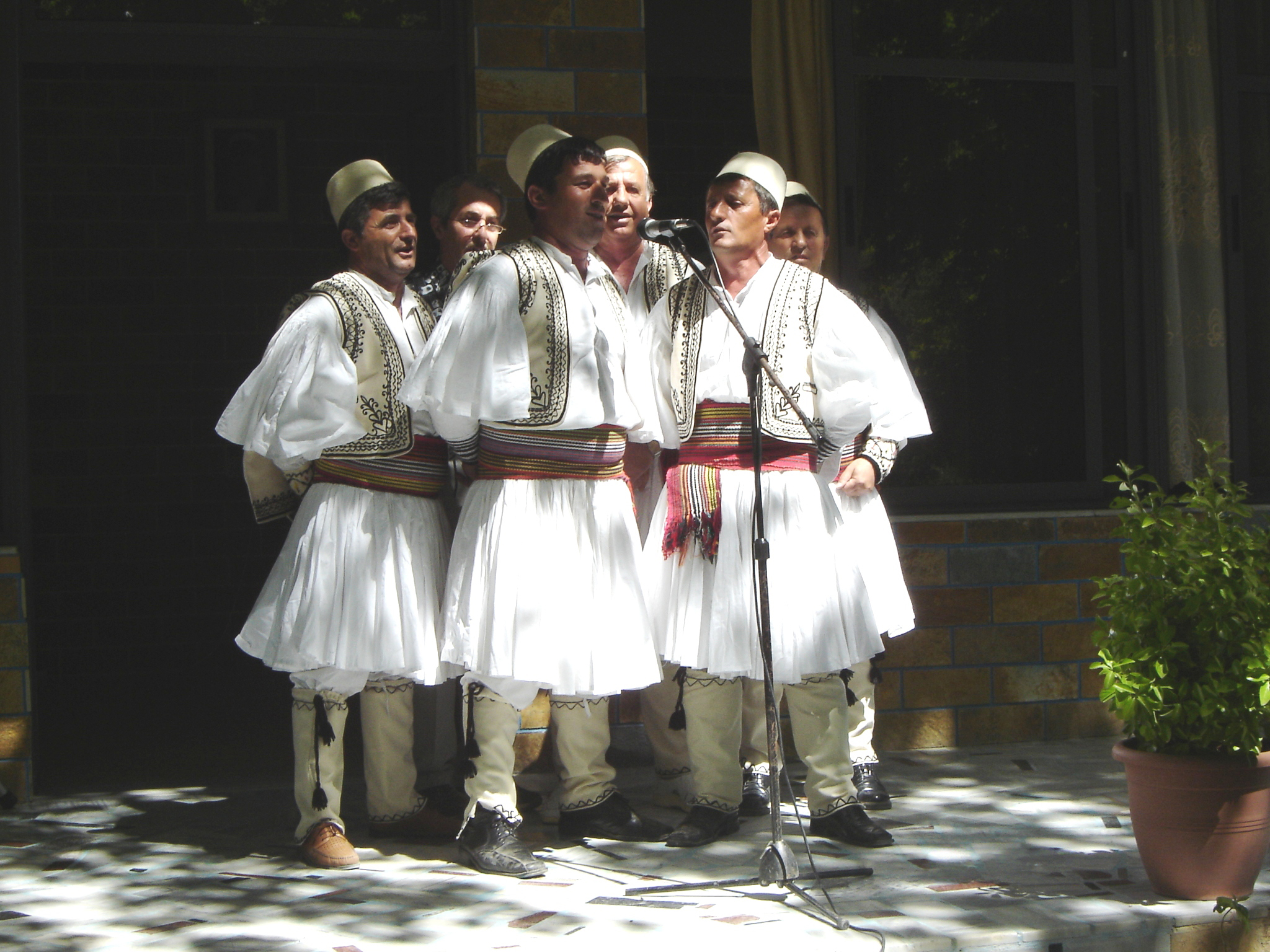
Albanian polyphonic group from Skrapar wearing qeleshe and fustanella

Among Albanians, all four regions of Myzeqe, Toskeri, Chameria, and Labëria have the polyphonic song as part of their culture. Among Albanians a related form of polyphonic singing is also found in northern Albania in the area of Peshkopi, the Albanian communities of Kaçanik in Kosovo, the areas of Polog, Tetovo, Kicevo and Gostivar in North Macedonia and the region of Malësia in northern Albania and southern Montenegro.

The region of Labëria is a particular region known for multipart singing and home to many different genres like that of pleqërishte. Songs can be of two, three, or four parts. Two part songs are sung only by women. Three part songs are more diffused and can be sung by men and women. Four part songs are a Labëria specialty. Research has shown that four part songs have come after three part ones and that they are the most complex form of polyphonical singing.

The Gjirokastër National Folklore Festival, Albania, (Albanian: Festivali Folklorik Kombëtar), has been held every five years in the month of October, starting from 1968 and it has typically included many polyphonic songs.

Albanian iso-polyphony is included in UNESCO's intangible cultural heritage list.

The tradition of polyphonic singing has been contested and used by both sides of the Greek and Albanian border in a nationalistic manner.

== Structure ==
Polyphonic groups of Epirus consist of at least four members. Each group has two soloists and a drone group, which provides and maintains the vocal rhythm of the song.

The first soloist (or the taker) (Greek: "πάρτης" (partis) or "σηκωτής" (sikotis), Albanian: Bëj zë or Mbaj kaba or marrësi, Aromanian: Atselu tsi u lia) is the voice that sings the main melody. The first soloist performs the beginning of the song (Greek: παίρνοντας (pernontas, taking) or σηκώνοντας (sikonontas, lifting), Albanian: e merr dhe e ngre), and literally acts as the narrator and leader of the group, singing the main part of the song. The second soloist (or the turner) (Greek: "γυριστής" (yiristis)) answers (or "turns") the voice (Greek: "γυρίζει" (yirizei, turns) or "τσακίζει" (tsakizei, crimps) Albanian: kthej zë or kthyesi, Mbahes or Kthehës or Pritës Aromanian: Atselu tsi u tali).

Sometimes, instead of the "turner", or according to some musicologists parallel with it, we find the role of the spinner (Greek: κλώστης (klostis, spinner), Albanian: dredhes). The "spinner" spins the song between the tonic and subtonic of the melody, a technique that reminds the movement of the hand which holds the spindle and spins the thread. This is a role that is often, but not always, found is the one of "rihtis", who drops (Greek: ρίχνει) the song in the end of the introduction of "partis", by singing an exclamation (e.g. Greek: αχ ωχ ωχ (ah oh oh) or, "άντε βρε" (ante vre)), which is a fourth lower than the tonic of the melody, resting "partis" and uniting its introduction with the entrance of the drone group.

The drone group is composed by the rest of the members of the polyphonic group and is also called iso keepers group (Greek: ισοκρατές, (isokrates, iso keepers) Albanian: Venkorë or Iso-mbajtës, and Aromanian: Isu), from the Greek Isocrates "ισοκράτης" and that from the Medieval Greek "ισοκρατών" (isokraton), "one who holds the ison", the note that holds on the whole length of a song, from Ancient Greek "ἴσος" (isos) generally meaning "equal" but here "equal in flight of song" + "κρατέω" (krateo) "to rule, to hold". The words ison and isos literally mean the continuous base note and isocrates creates and holds the modal base of the song. The isokrates role is particularly important; the louder the keeping of the vocal drone, (Greek: ισοκράτημα, romanized: isokratima), the more "βρονταριά" (vrontaria) (i.e. better) the song goes, because the rhythm and the vocal base of the song are maintained. The term derives from the Byzantine Greek musical tradition, where the "ίσον" also features.

The perfection of the rendition of the polyphonic song presupposes the existence and the unity of the several voices–roles of the polyphonic group. As a result, polyphonic song presupposes the collectiveness of expression and the firm distinction between the roles it reflects, and the unwritten hierarchy in the composition of the group and the distribution of the roles.

== See also ==
- Music of Greece
- Music of Albania
- Aromanian music
- Music of Epirus (Greece)
- Byzantine music
- Deropolitissa
- Song of Çelo Mezani
- Song of Marko Boçari
- Yodeling
