= Pogoniani =

Pogoniani Πωγωνιανή
- Municipal unit
- Location within the regional unit

- Location within Greece
- Coordinates: 40°00′N 20°25′E
- Country: Greece
- Administrative region: Epirus
- Regional unit: Ioannina
- Municipality: Pogoni

Area
  - Municipal unit: 56.693 km^{2} (21.889 sq mi)
  - Community: 18.830 km^{2} (7.270 sq mi)

Population (2021)
  - Municipal unit: 549
  - Municipal unit density: 9.68/km^{2} (25.1/sq mi)
  - Community: 441
  - Community density: 23.4/km^{2} (60.7/sq mi)
- Time zone: UTC+2 (EET)
  - Summer (DST): UTC+3 (EEST)
- Vehicle registration: ΙΝ

Pogoniani (Greek: Πωγωνιανή, pronounced [poɣoɲaˈni], before 1928: Βοστίνα, Vostina; Albanian: Voshtinë) is a village and a former community in the Ioannina regional unit, Epirus, Greece. Since the 2011 local government reform it is part of the municipality Pogoni, of which it is a municipal unit. The municipal unit has an area of 56.693 km^{2}, the community 18.830 km^{2}. The municipal unit consists of 4 villages: Pogoniani, Dolo, Drymades, Stavroskiadi.

== History ==
In antiquity the area of Pogoniani was inhabited by Molossians, one of the three main Ancient Greek tribes of the northwestern Greek group.

The establishment of the bishopric of Pogoniani is associated with the reign of Byzantine Emperor Constantine Pogonatos (r. 641–668) due to the latter's nickname, but it first appears in the Notitiae Episcopatuum during the reign of Andronikos III Palaiologos (r. 1328–1341). The seat of the archbishop was most likely in Depalitsa (modern Molyvdoskepastos). Pogoniani fell to the Ottoman Empire in 1447.

During the 16th century a successful entrepreneur of Pogoniani's diaspora, Ioannis Giormas, built a commercial complex in Bucharest, which included a church and an inn. This entire complex was to become a hub of the Greek commercial activity there and was nicknamed "Greeks' Inn." The three-aisled Orthodox basilica of Pogoniani was erected in 1873, with donations by the local Zosimas brothers benefactors. In the late Ottoman period and until 1923, the village of Pogoniani (known as Vostina) was inhabited by Muslim Albanians and Romani alongside Orthodox Greek inhabitants, Apart from this village there was no Muslim community in the entire administrative unit (kaza). Until 1924, the Muslims from the village of Pogoniani used to have close relations and exchanges with people from the town of Libohovë in Albania.

During the period prior to the First World War the British member of the International Commission that was responsible of the delineation of the Greek-Albanian border noticed that the villages that were ceded to Albania, which consist of the northern portion of Pogoniani are entirely Greek-speaking. From 1991 to 2012 a vocational training center was operating in the village attended by members of the Greek minority in Albania, with a total of 2,280 graduates. It was founded by the "Institution for the Rehabilitation of Greek co-ethnics from Albania" - supported by the Latsis Foundation - among various initiatives it offered scholarships for students from Albania and supported various financial initiatives in Albania in particular in the operation of various hospitals and medical centers there. Due to its location very close to Albania, employment opportunities and local networks, Pogoniani received large immigration inflow. In the 2001 census, c. 44% of the population of the community of Pogoniani was composed of migrants, mostly Albanians Part of the foreign population (2001) in particular among those attending the local school and the rehabilitation vocational training center came from the ethnic Greek community of Albania.
