= Ano Kalamas =

Ano Kalamas Άνω Καλαμάς
- Municipal unit
- Location within the regional unit

- Location within Greece
- Coordinates: 39°52′N 20°34′E
- Country: Greece
- Administrative region: Epirus
- Regional unit: Ioannina
- Municipality: Pogoni

Area
  - Municipal unit: 86.50 km^{2} (33.40 sq mi)

Population (2021)
  - Municipal unit: 1,970
  - Municipal unit density: 22.8/km^{2} (59.0/sq mi)
- Time zone: UTC+2 (EET)
  - Summer (DST): UTC+3 (EEST)
- Vehicle registration: ΙΝ

Ano Kalamas (Greek: Άνω Καλαμάς , Albanian:Mazrek) is a former municipality in the Ioannina regional unit, Epirus, Greece. Since the 2011 local government reform it is part of the municipality Pogoni, of which it is a municipal unit. The municipal unit has an area of 86.50 km^{2}. Population 1,970 (2021). The seat of the municipality was in Parakalamos.
