= Pogoni =

Pogoni Πωγώνι (Greek) Pugon (Aromanian)
- Municipality
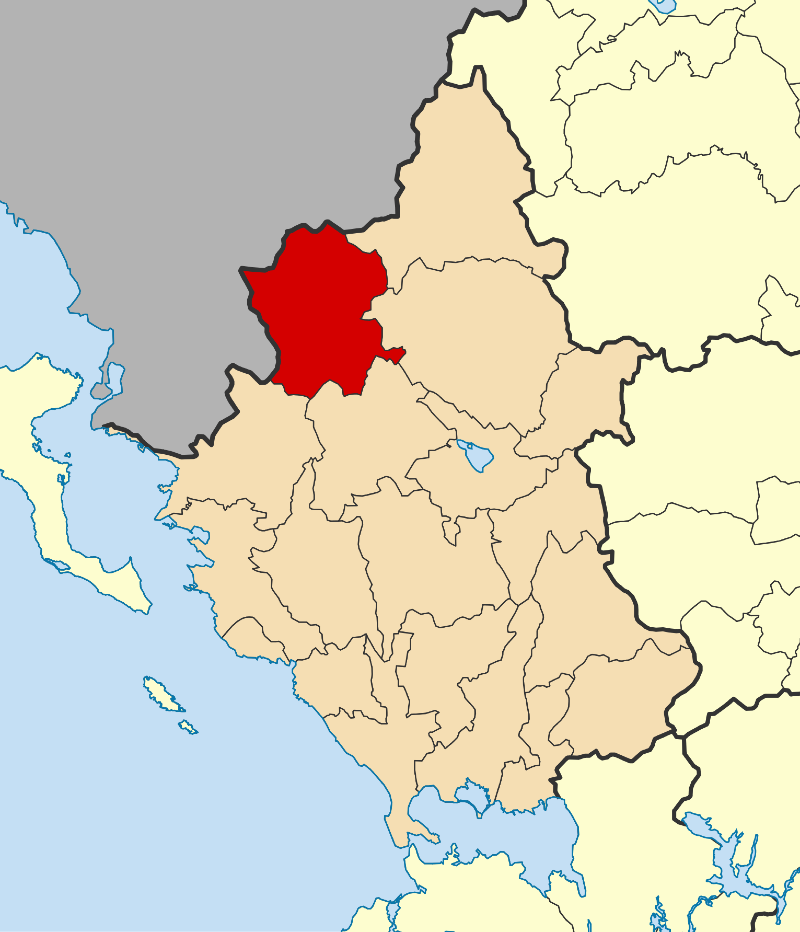

- Location within Greece
- Coordinates: 39°53′N 20°37′E
- Country: Greece
- Administrative region: Epirus
- Regional unit: Ioannina
- Seat: Kalpaki

Area
  - Municipality: 701.06 km^{2} (270.68 sq mi)

Population (2021)
  - Municipality: 6,848
  - Density: 9.768/km^{2} (25.30/sq mi)
- Time zone: UTC+2 (EET)
  - Summer (DST): UTC+3 (EEST)
- Vehicle registration: ΙΝ

Pogoni (Greek: Πωγώνι, Aromanian: Pugon) is a municipality in the Ioannina regional unit of Epirus, Greece. The seat of the municipality is the village Kalpaki. The municipality has an area of 701.059 km^{2}. Its population was 6,848 at the 2021 census.

== History ==
The historical region of Pogoni encompasses a larger area than the contemporary municipality. Six Greek-speaking villages in Albania which comprised the former commune of Pogon are also included in the region, as well as the area in and around Molyvdoskepastos in Greece, which is a part of the municipality of Konitsa. Culturally, the villages of Agia Marina, Chrysodouli, Ktismata, Mavropoulo, Neochori and Zavrocho are part of the Deropolis (Dropull) area, which also extends into Albania.

Pogoni was populated by the end of the Neolithic Age. Historically, the region was inhabited by the ancient Greek tribe of the Molossians. Along with the rest of Epirus, the area was annexed by the Kingdom of Greece in 1913 after the First Balkan War. Pogoni was also home to the 268th Patriarch of Constantinople, Athenagoras I.

== Administration ==
=== Municipality ===
The municipality Pogoni was formed at the 2011 local government reform by the merger of the following 6 former municipalities, that became municipal units:

- Ano Kalamas
- Ano Pogoni
- Delvinaki
- Kalpaki
- Lavdani
- Pogoniani

=== Province ===
The province of Pogoni (Greek: Επαρχία Πωγωνίου) was one of the provinces of the Ioannina Prefecture. Its territory corresponded with that of the current municipality Pogoni, except the municipal units Ano Kalamas and Kalpaki. Its seat was the village Delvinaki. It was abolished in 2006.

== Demographics ==
Pogoni has nearly 40 villages and all have a Greek-speaking population. Aromanian villages are Ano Parakalamos and Kefalovryso. The Aromanians form part of the village population in Argyrochori, Parakalamos, Vasiliko, Ano Ravenia, Chrysorrachi, Delvinaki, Doliana, Dolo, Kato Meropi, Kato Ravenia, Kouklioi, Pogoniani, Sitaria, Vissani and Zaravina. Excluding Kefalovryso, most Aromanians settled in these villages during the interwar period (1918–1939). The Romani form part of the village population in Delvinaki, Doliana and Parakalamos.

Albanians settled in Pogoni during the first decades of the 14th century and traces of their presence are found in several local toponyms. Over time, the Albanian presence in Lower Pogoni was assimilated by the local Greeks and hellenised. Some Albanians in Pogoni converted to Islam. Muslim Albanians constituted the majority population in Argyrochori, Chrysodouli, and Pogoniani; some departed in 1913, while others did so during the Greek–Turkish population exchange. In the modern period, some of the Pogoni population has migrated to Ioannina and Athens in Greece or aboard to Australia, Germany and the United States.

== See also ==
- Pogoni Municipality (Δήμος Πωγωνίου) (in Greek)
