= Plikati =

Plikati Πληκάτι Plikat
- Community
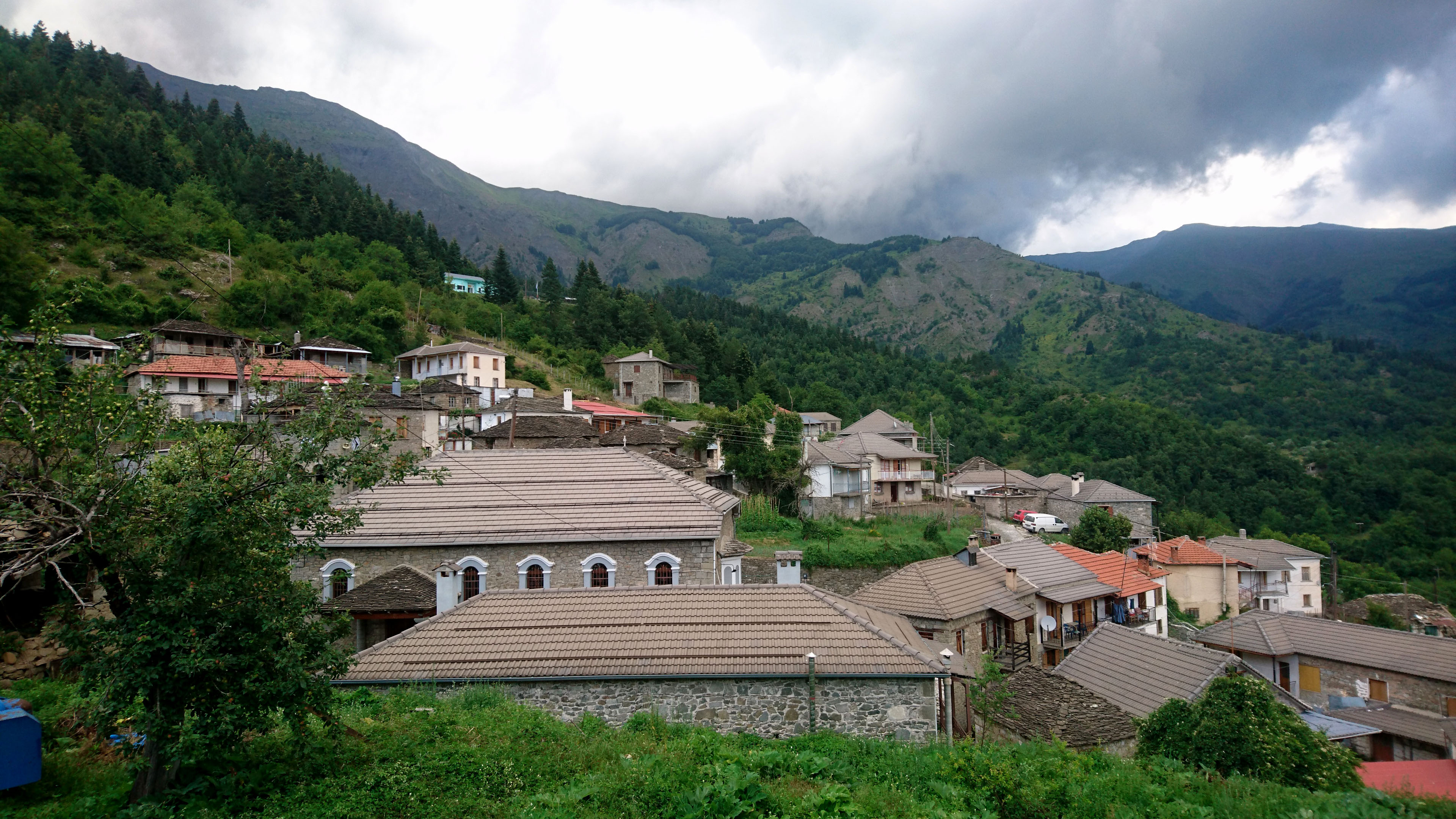
- View of Plikati

- Location within Greece
- Coordinates: 40°18′N 20°46′E
- Country: Greece
- Administrative region: Epirus
- Regional unit: Ioannina
- Municipality: Konitsa
- Municipal unit: Mastorochoria
- Elevation: 1,240 m (4,070 ft)

Population (2021)
  - Community: 69
- Time zone: UTC+2 (EET)
  - Summer (DST): UTC+3 (EEST)
- Vehicle registration: ΙΝ

Plikati (Greek: Πληκάτι, Albanian: Plikat) is a village in the municipal unit of Mastorochoria, Ioannina regional unit, Greece. It is one of the northernmost villages in Epirus. The village architecture is of stone houses with slate roofs, some either two or three storeys in height.

== Name ==
In the regional geographical literature of the early 19th century, Athanasios Psalidas and Kosmas Thesprotos wrote the name of the village as Pelikati. The toponym is derived from the Albanian root pellg(u), meaning 'swamp, marsh', and in a geographical context refers to a 'basin'. The suffix -ati is used to indicate inhabitants of a place or the names of family members; thus, the toponym initially as Pellgati indicated 'inhabitants of the basin'. The basin in the area of Plikati was formed by the Gorgopotamos river, a tributary of the Sarantaporos river.

The placename underwent metathesis and became Pllegati, and later Plikati after the Albanian g became k through Greek. The linguist Kostas Oikonomou described that the Aromanian rendering of the toponym plicat, -tă meaning 'bend', derived from aplec and ultimately from Latin plicare, is linguistically closer to the name, but he discounted it due to the absence of settlement by Aromanian speakers both in the past and the modern period in Plikati.

== Geography ==
The village is situated at the foot of the Grammos mountains, at 1,240 m elevation, close to the Albanian border. Plikati is 3 km north of Gorgopotamos, 8 km west of Aetomilitsa, 9 km southeast of Ersekë (Albania) and 28 km north of Konitsa.

Plikati is located close to a plain, part of the wider Gorogopotamos valley called Zarli by village inhabitants and formed by the drain off from water sources of the Grammos mountains. Woodland flora of oak and beech trees surround Plikati and fir trees in steeper areas. The total land area of the village Plikati is 3,200 hectares.

== History ==
Plikati had cultural and community relations over the centuries with the village of Rehovë (located in modern Albania) until the Albanian–Greek border was closed in 1945.

During the period of the late 18th and in the early 19th century, fleeing Christian populations (Aromanian and non–Aromanian) from several destroyed villages and areas sought refugee in Plikati, a mainly Arvanite village. The Aromanian refugees arrived from Valiani, a destroyed village on the Albanian side of Grammos mountain. Until the 1830s, Plikati belonged to the kaza (district) of Kolonjë and later was attached to the kaza of Konitsa. By 1839, Muslim Albanians from the nearby Kolonjë area pressured a large part of the Plikati population to leave the village. The Aromanian population in Plikati displaced from previous conflict departed along with Albanians from the village and together founded new villages in the area around Florina such as Belkameni and Negovani.

Under Ottoman rule Plikati had a few small chifliks (estates) until becoming part of Greece in 1913. Toward the end of Greek Civil War, Plikati was abandoned for a short time as battles occurred in the Grammos mountains and later over several years villagers came back. Between the 1960s–1970s, the population declined as villagers left Plikati for work and the remaining people were elderly.

== Demographics ==
Historical population
Year	Pop.	±%
1981	156	—
1991	133	−14.7%
2001	126	−5.3%
2011	70	−44.4%
2021	69	−1.4%

Plikati is one of the villages of the Epirus region in Greece inhabited by Arvanites (Christian Albanians) and Arvanitika speakers. Its people are sometimes called Arvanites, although the Albanian dialect they speak is different from that of Arvanitika speakers of southern Greece and much closer to Tosk Albanian.

At the onset of the 20th century most of the inhabitants were Orthodox Christian, along with some Muslim families who departed Plikati due to the Greek–Turkish population exchange (1923). K.D. Stergiopoulos wrote about the Konitsa area in the 1930s. He identified Plikati as an Albanian speaking village. People over 50 knew Albanian and Greek and used both languages in tandem. In recollections among a few elderly villagers of the late 2010s, the speaking of Arvanitika was banned at school in their youth by the local teacher and they viewed the practice positively.

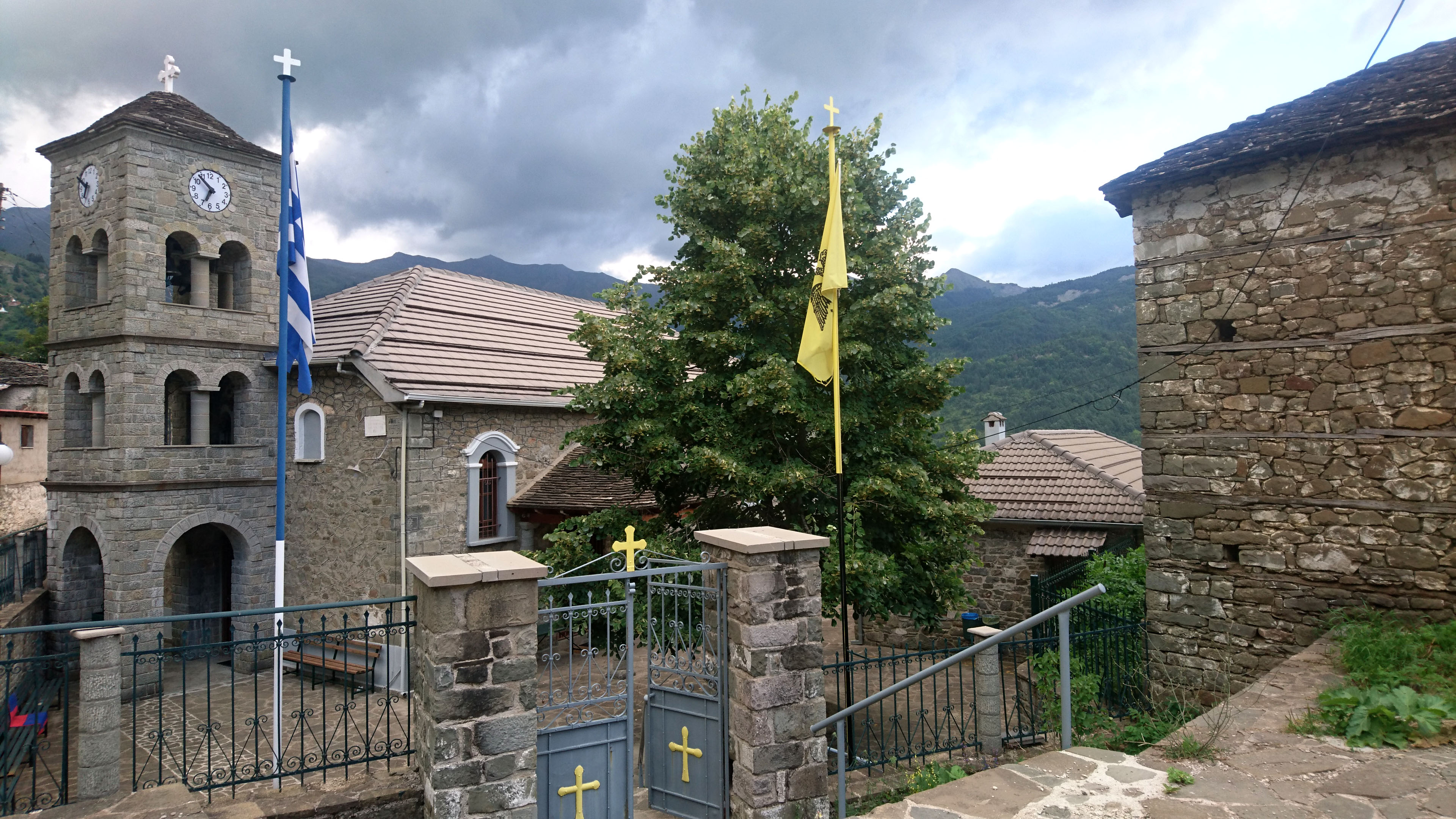
Orthodox church in Plikati

In the 1990s, seasonal Albanian migrants arrived from Albania, mainly from Rehovë. Plikati villagers identified themselves as Greek and different from Albanians. Elderly villagers communicated in Albanian with Albanian migrants. Kostas Oikonomou (2002) described Plikati as an Arvanite speaking village. In the early 21st century, the linguistic situation persisted and elderly inhabitants spoke Albanian. Plikati underwent a language shift and Greek has become the predominant language of the village, while Arvanitika is spoken only by elderly inhabitants in the late 2010s.

The number of inhabitants varied throughout the 20th century. In the Greek censuses, the population of Plikati was 268 in 1920, 384 in 1940, 46 in 1951–55, 243 in 1961, 188 in 1971 and 151 in 1981. According to Plikati inhabitants, the population prior to the Second World War was 500–700. The village population is in decline.

== Economy ==
Plikati at the beginning of the 20th century had a large number of animals and the surrounding plain and lower mountainous slopes consisted of mainly cultivated land and some areas of scrub with few mature trees. The men of Plikati worked as builders. In Greece, they traditionally left during the winter months and worked in towns located in the lowlands.

Farming on a wider scale was practised in Plikati until the 1960s and irrigated crops grown in rotation on the plain included corn and wheat. Unirrigated crops were wheat, oats, barley, lentils, rye, and bitter vetch which were grown in higher altitudes on the southern mountain slopes, often on land also used for grazed fallow. Grain was purchased by several large households due to land shortages as did several small households due to labour shortages caused by the migration of men. Surplus grain grown by some inhabitants was sold to fellow villagers or outside Plikati.

Plikati was mostly self sufficient and able to provide for the dietary needs of its inhabitants such as bread and the money made by working men was used to purchase oil, rice, clothing and shoes. Inhabitants from Plikati used to purchase goods and sell their agricultural products in Korçë and Ersekë in Albania, instead of nearby Konitsa, a market town in Greece until the Albanian–Greek border closed in 1940. Farming in Plikati increased from the time of the border closure until the Greek Civil War.

Large numbers of domestic animals such as sheep, goats, horses, mules and donkeys were kept by villagers and all households owned a cow and oxen for ploughing. The number of cattle was 500–600 and sheep amounted to 2,000 with households keeping 30–40 head to 70 head, able to provide for the village needs of dairy and meat products with the surplus sold. Household flocks were herded by shepherds on the lower areas of the nearby mountain. Village pastoral land was rented by some Aromanians from the lowlands for grazing. Until 1940, several households with large flocks would spend the winter in the plains. During the 1960s Plikati builders worked in Germany and came back in the winter.

In the late 20th century, inhabitants had irrigated gardens near their homes and grew potatoes, corn, beans and some rye for straw, while fruit and nut trees were harvested. Households kept between 5 to 20 sheep and goats for their personal needs and a few mules to plough land and as pack animals. The total number of sheep and goats was 200–300. As most villagers were elderly, the harvest of hay from woodland sources as feed for animals declined.

== See also ==
- List of settlements in the Ioannina regional unit
