= Papa Kristo Negovani =

Albanian priest and writer (1875–1905)

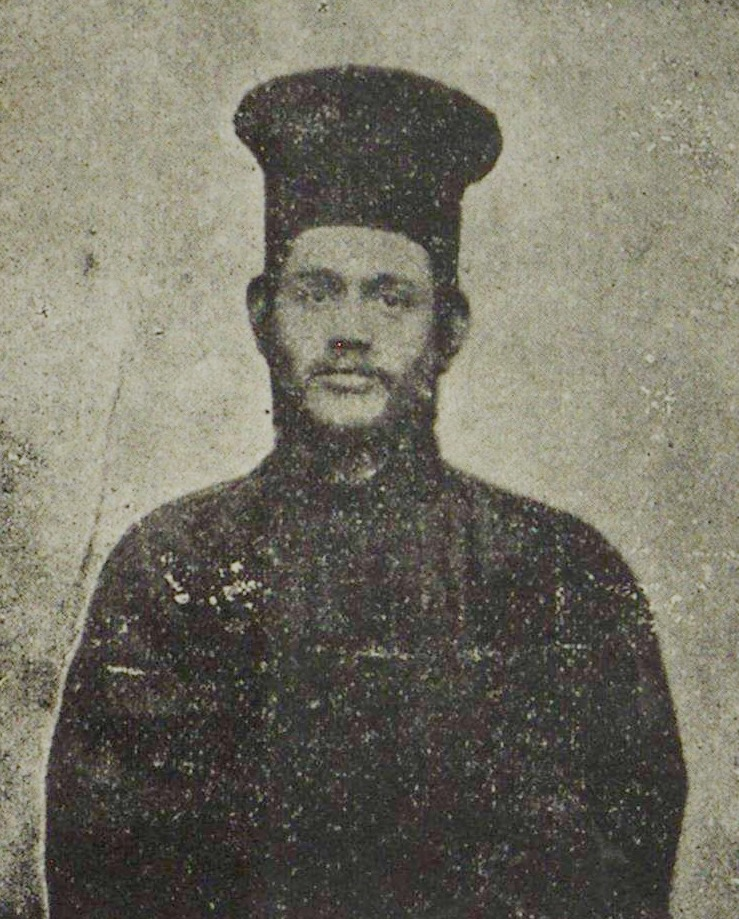
- Born: 1875; Negovan, now part of Florina in Greece, then Manastir Vilayet, Ottoman Empire
- Died: 12 February 1905 (aged 29–30); Negovan
- Occupations: Teacher, Priest, Publisher
- Writing career
- Period: 1895–1905
- Notable works: The History of the Old Testament (Albanian: Istori e Dhiatës së Vjetërë); The Destruction of Hormova (Albanian: Prishija e Hormovësë)
- Movement: Albanian National Revival

Papa Kristo Negovani (Albanian: Papa Kristo Negovani), born Kristo Harallambi and also known as Kristo Negovani (1875 – 12 February 1905), was an Albanian national figure, priest, poet, teacher, writer and publisher who was killed by Greek nationalists in 1905 for using Albanian during liturgy.

== Biography ==
Born as Kristo Harallambi in the village of Negovani, Manastir Vilayet, Ottoman Empire (now in Florina municipality, modern Greece), he became known in his lifetime as Kristo Negovani. He had a brother who was a priest and had pro-Aromanian orientations. His father was a merchant based in Athens, Greece and a young Negovani through a Greek scholarship pursued his secondary schooling in the Greek capital. Negovani's father was killed by bandits in 1891 and he began working as a teacher in Greek schools.

Later, Kristo Negovani emigrated to Brăila, Romania in 1894, joining other fellow migrants from Negovani and he worked as a carpenter. There, he came into contact with the Albanian National Revival movement, developing in tandem with the Aromanian–Romanian national movement at the time, and attained Albanian national sentiments.

In 1897, he returned to his native village and worked as a teacher and later also became a parish priest. Over time, some several thousand people became followers of Negovani. He performed mass in the Albanian language and taught children in their mother tongue.

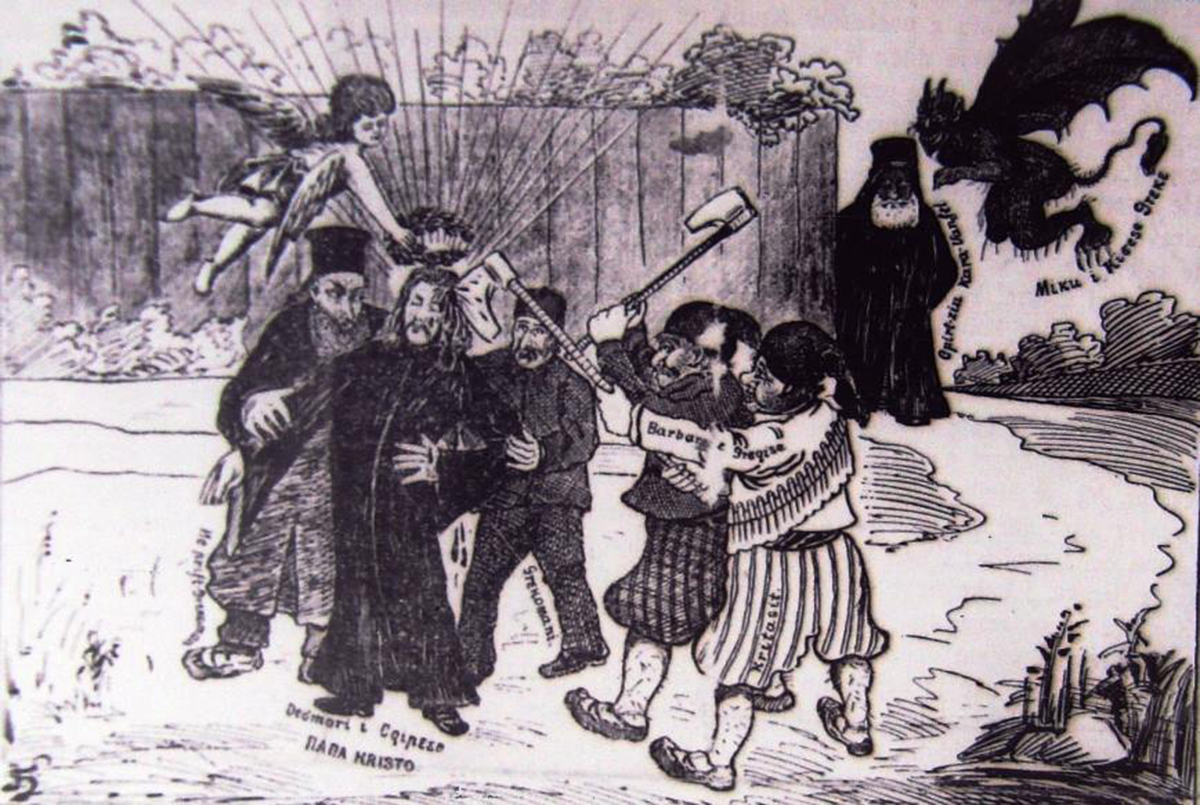
The killing of Papa Kristo Negovani as depicted by Dielli newspaper in 1905.

From 1899 onward, Negovani published works in Albanian such as fables and didactic poems, religious instruction texts and articles often composed as sermons in Albanian publications like the almanac Kalendari Kombiar and newspaper Drita. Several notable works in Albanian by Negovani were the History of the Old Testament (1899), a History of the Bible (1903), and the Acts of the Holy Apostles (1906).

Negovani opposed Greek propaganda and was against marriages with "foreign elements". During 1905, Negovani, in the presence of Bishop Karavangelis conducted the Orthodox Divine Liturgy in the Albanian Tosk dialect. Karavangelis denounced the usage of Albanian in mass and under his orders had Negovani murdered. The village of Negovani was attacked (12 February 1905) by Greek guerillas (andartes) and Kristo Negovani along with his brother and three other villagers were killed. Negovani's death aroused a nationalist response with the Albanian guerilla band of Bajo Topulli killing the Metropolitan of Korçë, Photios.

== Works and legacy ==
Papa Kristo Negovani on a 2026 postage stamp of Albania

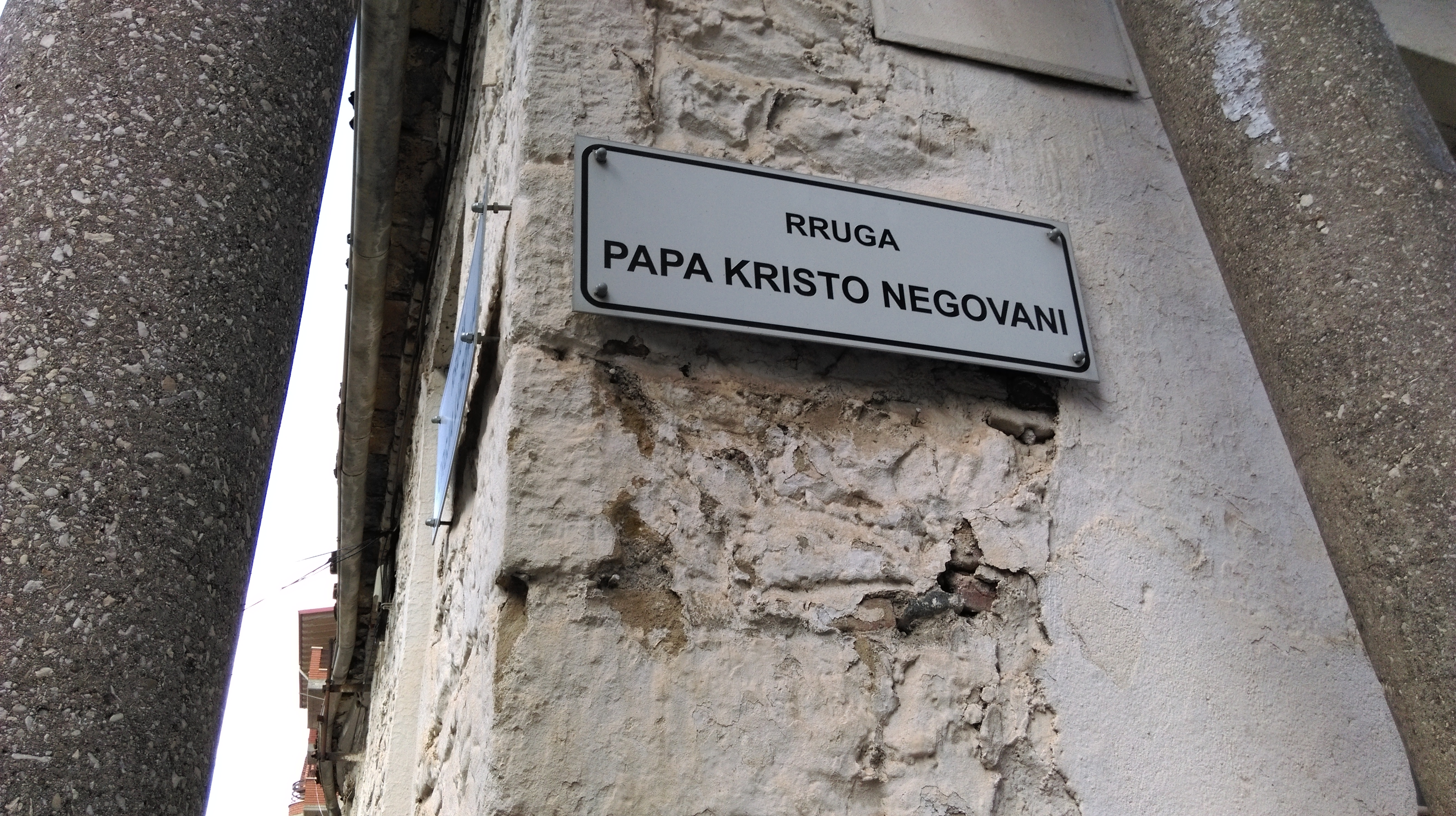
Papa Kristo Negovani street in Korçë

Negovani is the author of prose and poetry, including school texts, translations and fables. Among his publications are

- The History of the Old Testament, (Albanian: Istori e Dhiatës së Vjetërë), Bucharest 1889;
- The Destruction of Hormova, (Albanian: Prishija e Hormovësë), Sofia 1904;
- Little Dhonat Argjendi (Albanian: I vogëli Dhonat Argjendi), Costanza 1904;
- Works of the Holy Apostles (Albanian: Bëmatë të shëntorëvet dërgimtarë), Sofia 1906
- History of Plikati (Albanian: Istorishkronjë e Plikatit), Thessaloniki 1909.
