= Monastiri, Ioannina =

Monastiri Μοναστήρι
- Community
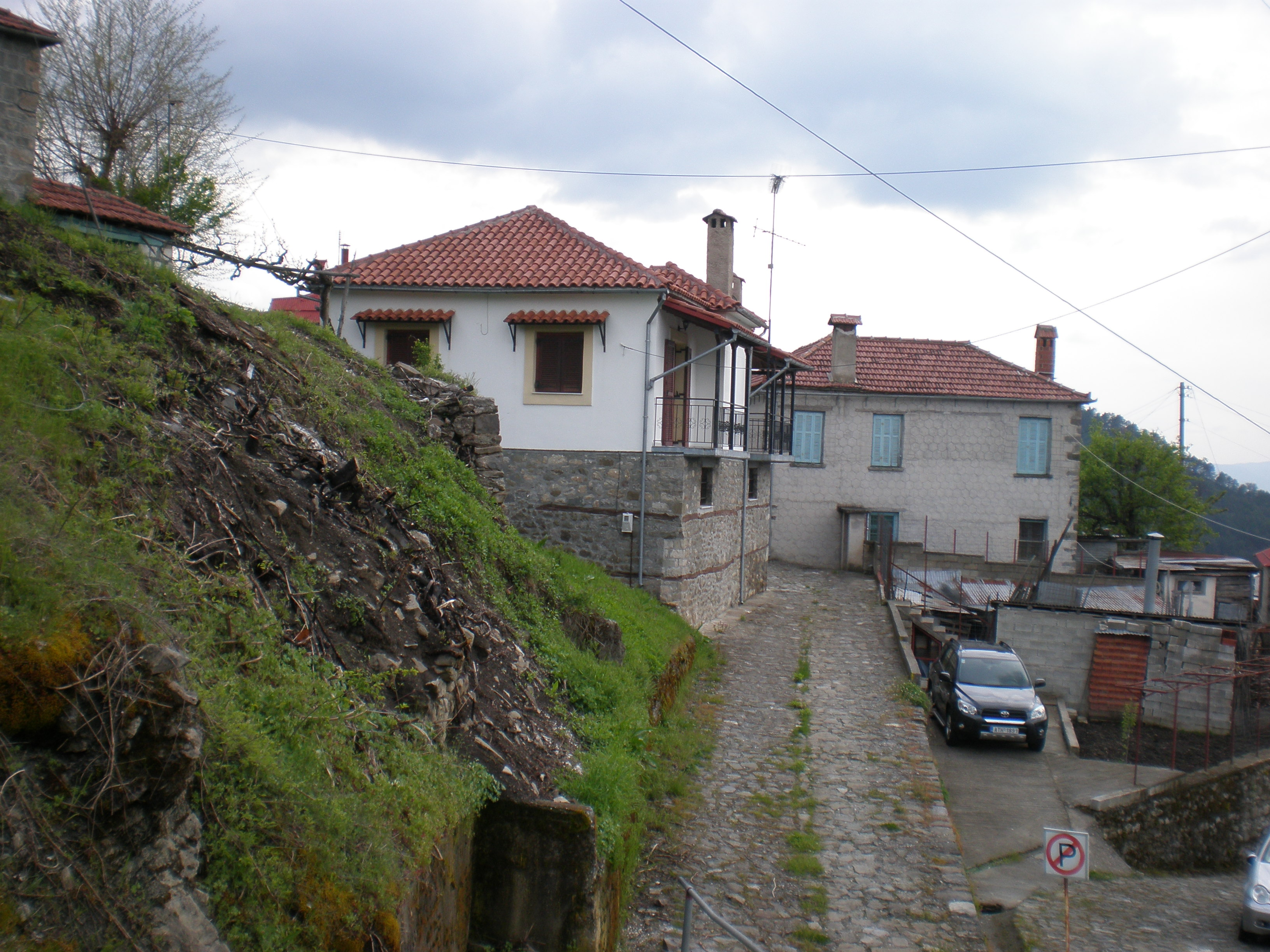
- Monastiri, Greece

- Location within Greece
- Coordinates: 40°07′19″N 20°48′26″E
- Country: Greece
- Administrative region: Epirus
- Regional unit: Ioannina
- Municipality: Konitsa
- Municipal unit: Konitsa

Population (2021)
  - Community: 5
- Time zone: UTC+2 (EET)
  - Summer (DST): UTC+3 (EEST)
- Vehicle registration: ΙΝ

Monastiri (Greek: Μοναστήρι, before 1928: Μποτσιφάρι, Botsifari) is a settlement in the Ioannina regional unit in Epirus, Greece. It is situated on the northwestern slopes of Smolikas, at the elevation of 950m. Below the village is the river Sarantaporos, which empties into the Vjosa a few kilometers west before entering Albania. It is in the municipality of Konitsa. It is 1 km southwest of Molista, 10 km northeast of Konitsa and 18 km east of Leskovik (Albania).

== Name ==
According to local tradition, after the dissolution of the original village Molista, three new settlements were established. In one of the new villages, Votsis was its first inhabitant and named the locality Votsi-fari.

The toponym is derived from the surname Botsis, also Votsis. The linguist Manolis Triantafyllidis wrote the surname Votsis is derived from the Albanian voc, -i 'little child'. The linguist Kostas Oikonomou described Botsis/Votsis as being of the same etymological origin; since the foreign b can be rendered in Greek as v and not in reverse, their reduced form is the Albanian boc/ë, -a 'bottle', stemming from Venetian bozza. The word is also present in Greek as botsa 'wooden wine container', Aromanian boță 'bottle', and in the South Slavic languages of Bulgarian, Serbo-Croatian, and Slovenian as boca.

The second part is from the Albanian noun far/ë, -a, 'genus, seed', with the placename meaning 'place where Botsi’s clan is located'. In Albanian, the constituent parts in determinative compounds follow the order: determinate (general concept) and the determiner, while in Greek it is in reverse order. In instances when the Albanian formation of compounds is in reverse, Oikonomou stated it is due to semantic-translational loans indicating a Greek-Albanian composition.

== Demographics ==
Historical population
Year	Pop.	±%
1981	99	—
1991	108	+9.1%
2001	23	−78.7%
2011	17	−26.1%
2021	5	−70.6%

== See also ==
- List of settlements in the Ioannina regional unit
