= Flampouro, Florina =

Flampouro Φλάμπουρο
- Community
- Location within Greece
- Country: Greece
- Geographic region: Macedonia
- Administrative region: Western Macedonia
- Regional unit: Florina
- Municipality: Florina
- Municipal unit: Perasma

Population (2021)
  - Community: 347
- Time zone: UTC+2 (EET)
  - Summer (DST): UTC+3 (EEST)

Flampouro (Greek: Φλάμπουρο, before 1928: Νεγοβάνη – Negovani; Albanian: Negovan; Aromanian: Niguvanlji) is a village in the central part of Florina regional unit, northern Greece, part of the Perasma municipal unit.

== History ==
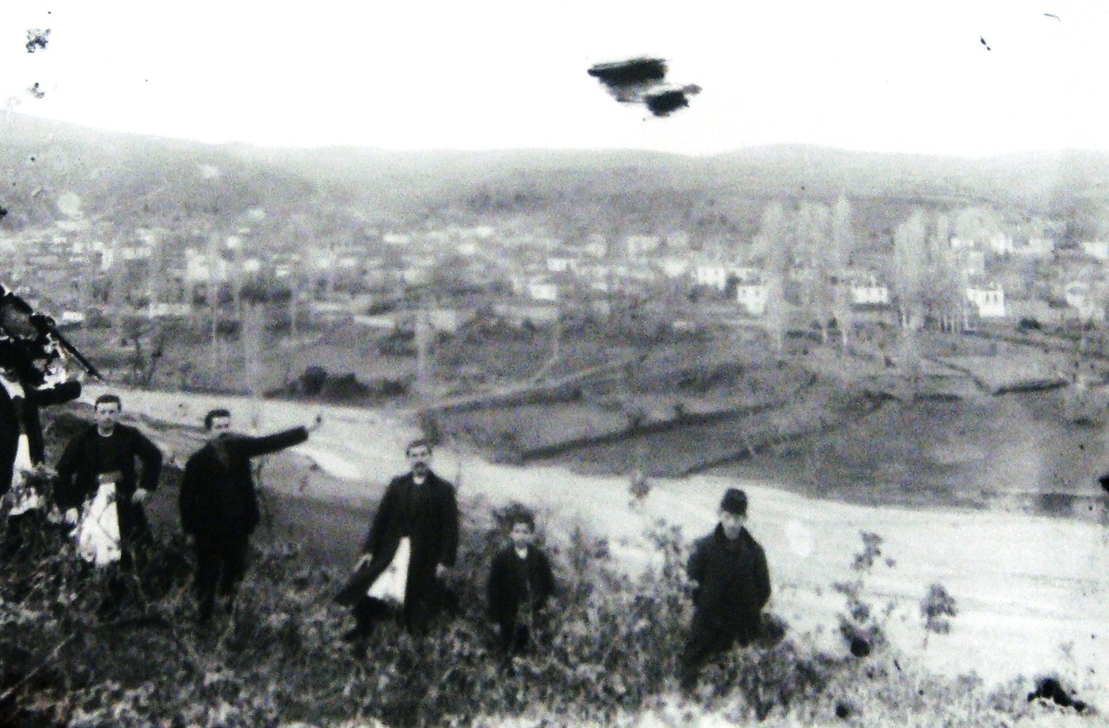
Negovani, 1906-1907

Negovani was established between 1860/1861. It was the second village after Belkameni within the area to be founded by an Albanian population along with some Aromanians. The village population originated from Konitsa kaza (district) in Epirus, mainly from the Albanian village of Plikati and others from nearby Aromanian villages of Mount Gramos, having together left due to pressure from Muslim Albanians of the Kolonjë region in the mid nineteenth century.

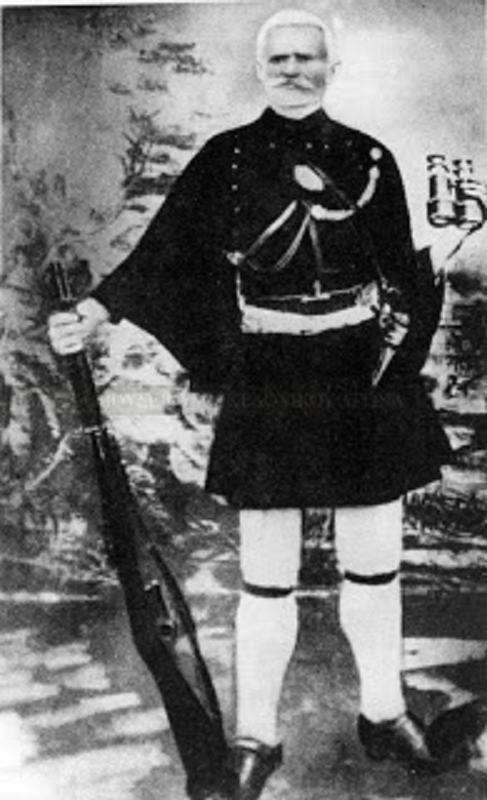
Georgios Seridis, Greek guerilla leader

Negovani was a mixed Albanian speaking and Aromanian speaking village of the Florina area. In statistics gathered by Vasil Kanchov in 1900, Negovani was populated by 620 Christian Albanians and 100 Aromanians. The village refused Bulgarian moves for it to become involved in the Ilinden Uprising (1903) against the Ottoman Empire. Diplomats from Greece considered Negovani secure and unaffected by Bulgarians and instead were concerned about Albanian and Romanian nationalism in the village. Negovani, with its population of hellenised Albanians, participated extensively on the Greek side of the Macedonian Struggle in the late Ottoman period. Several local villagers joined the Macedonian Struggle as fighters or agents.

Some villagers from Negovani immigrated to Romania. In the early twentieth century, the majority of the migrant Albanian community (some 200 people) in Brăila was composed of people from Negovani and nearby Belkameni. Migrants from Negovani and Belkameni in Brăila founded a society (1904) named Djalëria (The Youth) and it was financed by Romanian Prince Albert Ghica. Another society named Saint George was founded (1910) in Brăila by people from Negovani.

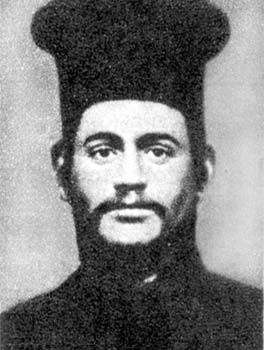
Albanian Orthodox priest Kristo Negovani

In 1905, Orthodox priest Kristo (Harallambi) Negovani in his native village conducted the divine liturgy in the Albanian Tosk dialect and his efforts on using Albanian in mass were condemned by Bishop Karavangelis who ordered his murder. The village of Negovani was attacked (February 1905) by Greek guerillas (andartes) and Kristo Negovani along with four other villagers (one was his brother Theodosius Harallambi who was fighting to preserve the Aromanian language) were killed (beheaded). Theodosius Harallambi's wife, Vaia Florica, and two of her children (Zaharina, married Pandele and ... fled to Braila immediately afterwards and another child of his (Lambru Harallambi) left on his own and ended up in Australia. Vasil, another Orthodox priest from Negovani used Albanian in village church services until 1909 and later was killed by authorities from the Orthodox Patriarchate Church. Following the Young Turk Revolution (1909), the Greek clergy's prominent position in places like Negovani was contested by Aromanian and Albanian nationalists. In Negovani, its Albanian population used force to safeguard the position of the Patriarchate Church within the village.

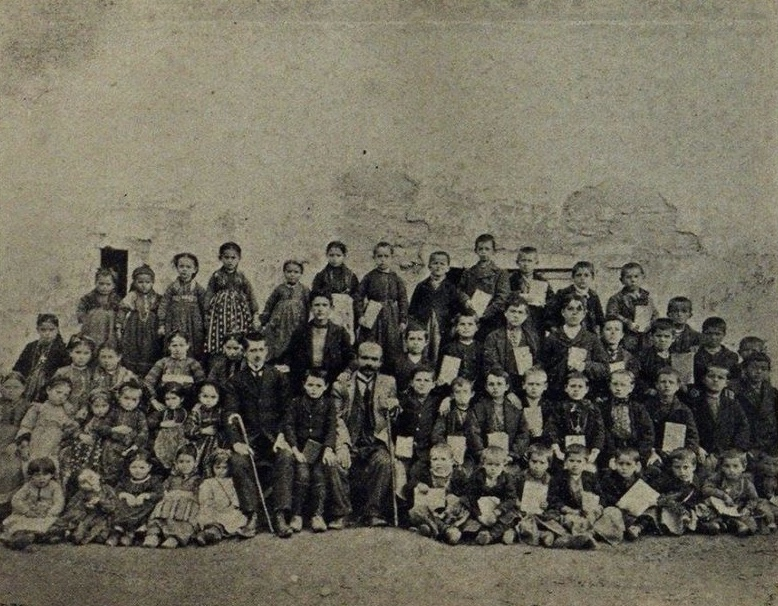
Albanian school of Negovani, late Ottoman period

An Albanian school was founded (1912) in Negovani and at its inauguration, mass was conducted by a Bulgarian priest as an Albanian priest was unavailable. There were also discussions for establishing a Romanian school with a Romanian teacher in Negovani. During the Balkan Wars (1912-1913) the area came under the control of the Greek forces. The Treaty of London would allot the area to Greece, and the borders were confirmed by the Paris Peace Conference, 1919.

World War II engulfed Europe and Flambouro, like the rest of Greece was affected. In the Battle of Greece (6–30 April 1941), the country faced three Axis powers: Nazi Germany, the Kingdom of Italy and the Kingdom of Bulgaria. Their alliance won the conflict and established an Axis occupation of Greece. The men of Flambouro went on to fight the German occupation as women took control of the village and defended it. Following the German devastation of Flambouro, the people of the village set out to rebuild it to its original state. From April 1944 till April 1947 the villagers rebuilt Flambouro. The end of World War II was followed in Greece by the Greek Civil War between the Democratic Army of Greece and the Hellenic Army. In the first stages of the civil war many communist-led guerrillas used the village as a hiding place. On April 7, 1947, the Greek government under Dimitrios Maximos adopted a policy of forced relocation for certain villages that were strategic for the guerrillas. As the village of Flambouro was already loyal and occupied by the Hellenic Army, still, many children were sent to communist countries such as Poland, Romania, Czechoslovakia, and the USSR as refugees. These children were known as Flambouro's lost generation. Other village natives fled with the aid of the Truman Doctrine to the United States in hope of finding employment to send money home to the rest of their families.

In the 1950s and 1960s a new era was coming about in Greece, it was the time of emigration. Many families, because of economic conditions, from all around Greece started to emigrate, becoming part of the Greek diaspora. Individuals and families who emigrated from Flambouro mostly went to the United States, Canada, West Germany, and Australia in search of a new life. Some went with the intention to make money and return, but many did not return to Greece and left their villages in their past.

In the late 1990s, some Arvanite customs were revived by villagers in Flambouro.

At present, the cities of Rochester (New York) and Adelaide (South Australia) have the largest concentration of immigrants and families that trace their roots from Flambouro. Many Flambouryiotes still visit Flambouro. The present village has a hotel where many Greeks from other regions of Greece come to the Florina region for camping, relaxation and to see local fauna and flora of Macedonia. Over the decades, the village population has undergone depopulation. The village's year round population is estimated at 500 people, but in the summer it grows to nearly 700.

== Demographics ==
Flambouro had 556 inhabitants in 1981. In fieldwork done by anthropologist Riki Van Boeschoten in late 1993, Flambouro was populated by Albanians. Albanian was spoken in the village by people over 30 in public and private settings. Children understood the language, but mostly did not use it. Aromanian was spoken by people over 60, mainly in private.

== Culture ==
Flampouro has not been influenced by the nearby predominant Slavic musical tradition of the area, and villagers have no knowledge of songs from their neighbours. Dances performed in Flampouro are the Berati, Hasapia, Tsamiko, Kalamatiano, along with the Poustseno.

== Notable people ==
- Papa Kristo Negovani, Albanian religious leader and writer
- Koçi Xoxe, former Albanian minister of Defence in communist Albania
- Georgios Seridis, Greek guerilla leader during the Greek Struggle for Macedonia

== Notes ==
- Part of the article is edited and translated from the Florina Prefecture Historical Society
