= Dimitrios Adamou =

Greek politician (1914–1991)

Dimitrios Adamou MEP
- Δημήτριος Αδάμος
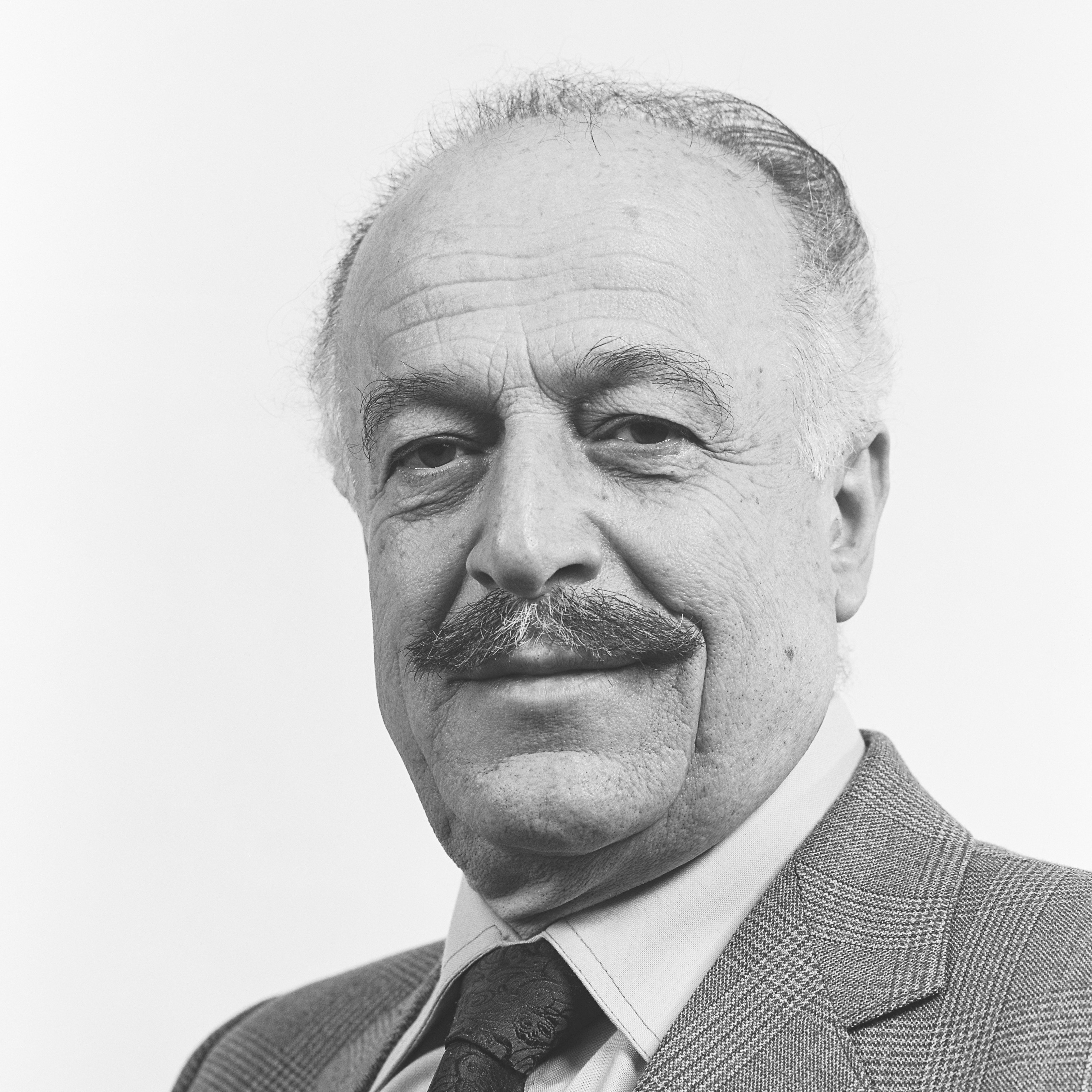

Member of the European Parliament
- In office 2 November 1981 – 18 September 1987
- Constituency: Greece

Personal details
- Born: October 20, 1914 Pyrsogianni, Ioannina, Greece
- Died: December 24, 1991 (aged 77) Athens, Greece
- Party: Communist Party of Greece

Dimitrios Adamou (20 October 1914 – 24 December 1991) was a Greek politician and a writer, who from 1981 until 1987, was a Member of the European Parliament, representing Greece for the Communist Party. He was born at Pyrsogianni, Ioannina. From 1989 to his death served as chairman of the Greek Writers' Association.

He died on 24 December 1991.
