= Kastaniani =

Kastaniani Καστάνιανη
- Community
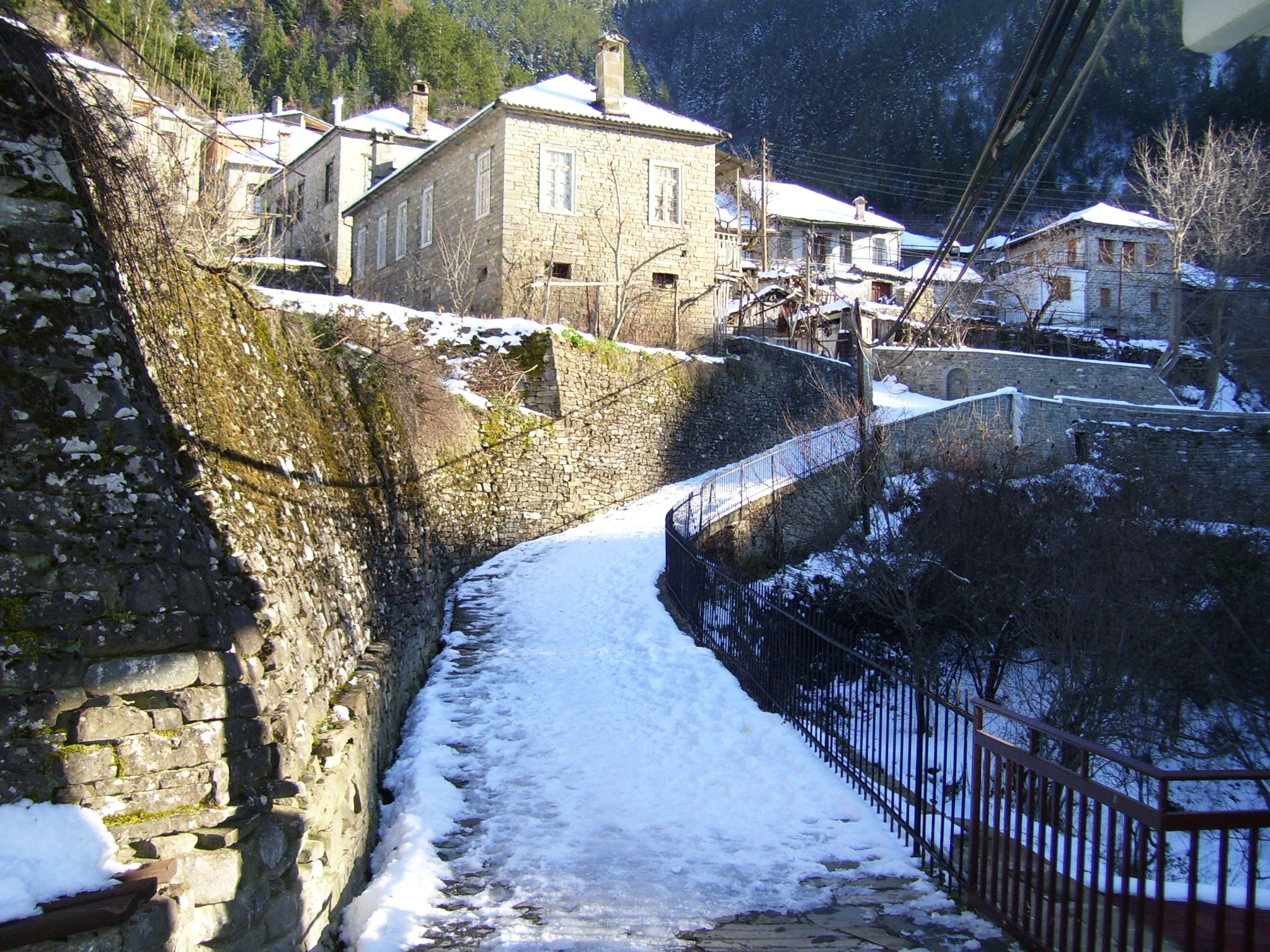

- Location within Greece
- Coordinates: 40°11′N 20°50′E
- Country: Greece
- Administrative region: Epirus
- Regional unit: Ioannina
- Municipality: Konitsa
- Municipal unit: Mastorochoria
- Elevation: 880 m (2,890 ft)

Population (2021)
  - Community: 140
- Time zone: UTC+2 (EET)
  - Summer (DST): UTC+3 (EEST)
- Vehicle registration: ΙΝ

Kastaniani (Greek: Καστάνιανη, between 1950 and 2013: Καστανέα, Kastanea) is a mountain village in the Ioannina regional unit in northern Greece. It is part of the municipal unit of Mastorochoria. It is situated in the northern Pindus mountains, near the left bank of the river Sarantaporos. It is 4 km southeast of Pyrsogianni and 18 km northeast of Konitsa.

== Name ==
In a monograph (1971) by Chrystos Gasios about the village, he wrote Kostiani was another form of the placename Kastaniani. The placename stems from the Slavic form Kostanjane and is derived from the toponym Kostanj, from the word kostanь meaning 'chestnut' and the suffix -jane, used in the formation of words to denote an inhabitant of a region. The Slavic o became a through Greek in the toponym.

The linguist Kostas Oikonomou stated, toponyms with the suffix jane, also -jani, have Slavic words as their subject and the ending did not become productive in Greek; hence, attributing the above placename to a production from the Greek noun kastano or kastania is inapplicable.

== Demographics ==
Historical population
Year	Pop.	±%
1981	244	—
1991	205	−16.0%
2001	134	−34.6%
2011	79	−41.0%
2021	140	+77.2%

== See also ==
- List of settlements in the Ioannina regional unit
