= Guri i Capit =

Mountain in Albania

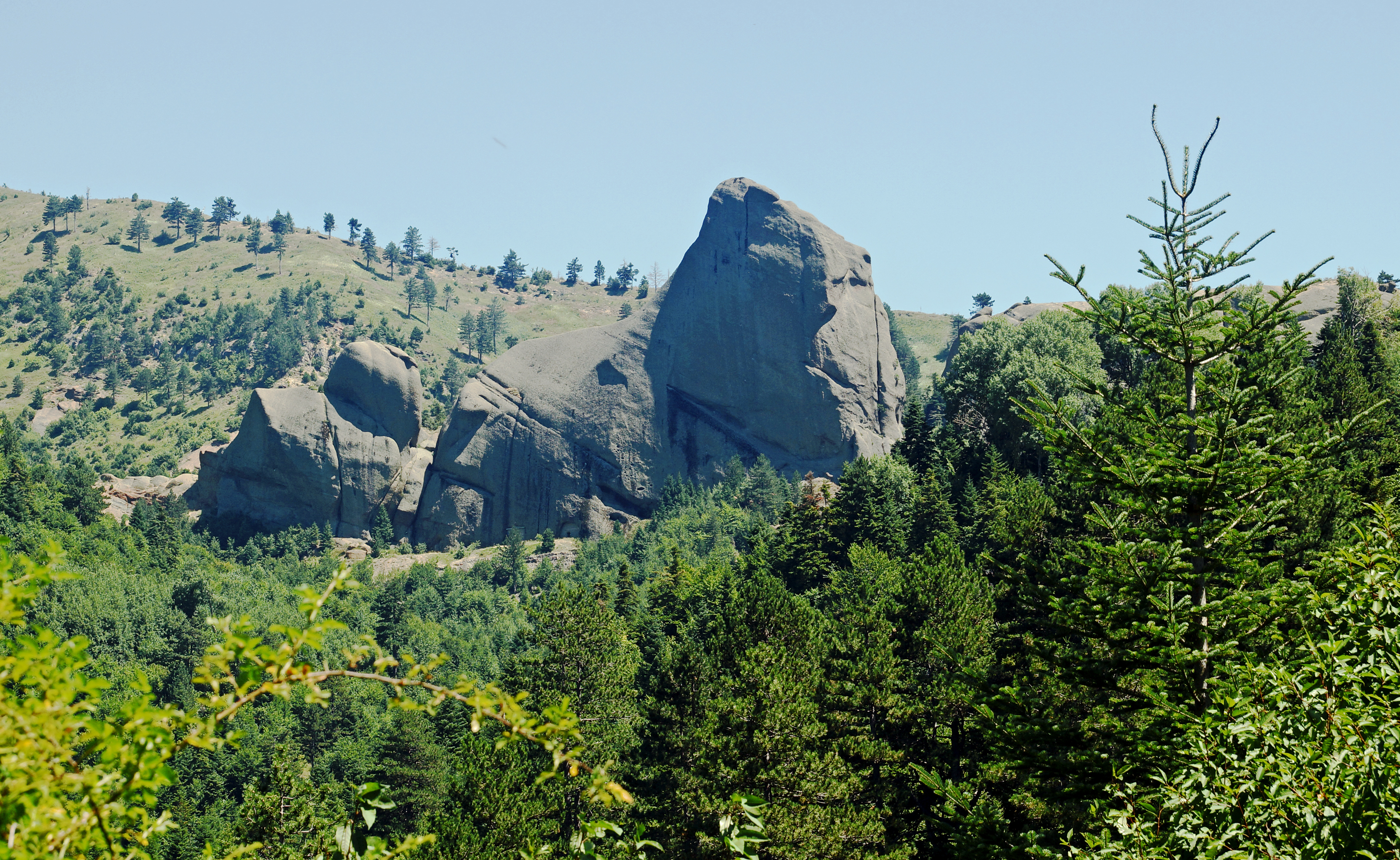
- View of Guri i Capit

Highest point
- Elevation: 1,547 m (5,075 ft)
- Prominence: 26 m (85 ft)
- Isolation: 330 m (1,080 ft)
- Coordinates: 40°35′19″N 20°50′55″E

Naming
- English translation: Goat Rock

Geography
- Location within Albania
- Country: Albania
- Region: Southern Mountain Region
- Municipality: Devoll
- Parent range: Morava Highlands

Geology
- Rock age: Miocene
- Mountain type: peak
- Rock type(s): conglomerate, molasse

Guri i Capit (lit. 'Billy Goat Stone') is a peak on the Morava Highlands, located within the park of Bozdovec, in the municipality of Devoll, southeastern Albania. The peak reaches a height of 1,547 m (5,075 ft) and has been designated a natural monument (cat. III).

== Etymology ==
Guri i Capit derives its name from a stone monument found in the park that measures approximately 20–25 m (66–82 ft) in length, 5–10 m (16–33 ft) in width, and roughly 10 m (33 ft) in height. Legend has it that the name was inspired by a goat that fell onto the stone. The word capit in the local dialect, referring to the standard "cjapit", is English for billy goat.

== Geology ==
The monument is predominantly composed of conglomerates and molasse of the Miocene period. Due to variations in erosion and wind effects, it has acquired a captivating shape, resembling a colossal sitting camel. As such, it carries significance in the fields of science, education, aesthetics and tourism.

== See also ==
- List of mountains in Albania
