= Gorgopotamos, Ioannina =

Gorgopotamos Γοργοπόταμος
- Community
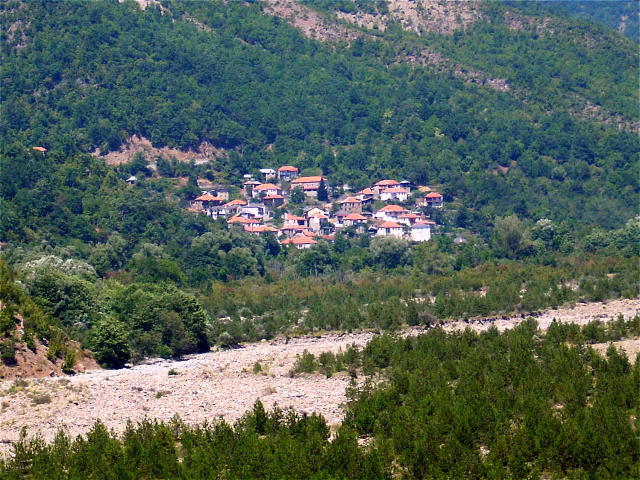

- Location within Greece
- Coordinates: 40°16′16″N 20°45′54″E
- Country: Greece
- Administrative region: Epirus
- Regional unit: Ioannina
- Municipality: Konitsa
- Municipal unit: Mastorochoria

Population (2021)
  - Community: 43
- Time zone: UTC+2 (EET)
  - Summer (DST): UTC+3 (EEST)

Gorgopotamos (Greek: Γοργοπόταμος) is a small village located at the foot of Mount Grammos of Epirus (Greece). It is surrounded by forest and the small river of Gorgopotamos runs right next to it. Gorgopotamos is part of the municipal unit of Mastorochoria of Ioannina regional unit, North-West Greece. Its location is very close to the Greek-Albanian borders. In 2021 it had a population of 43.

Some Albanians from Gorgopotamos would work as masons in Zagori, but would usually stay briefly and rarely settled there.

== Bibliography ==
- Kahl, Thede (1999). "Die Zagóri-Dörfer in Nordgriechenland: Wirtschaftliche Einheit – ethnische Vielfalt". Ethnologia Balkanica. 3.
