= Pyrsogianni =

Pyrsogianni Πυρσόγιαννη
- Community
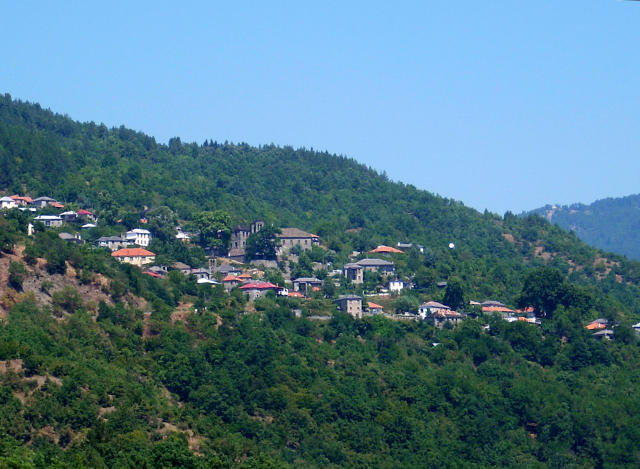

- Location within Greece
- Coordinates: 40°12′N 20°49′E
- Country: Greece
- Administrative region: Epirus
- Regional unit: Ioannina
- Municipality: Konitsa
- Municipal unit: Mastorochoria
- Elevation: 850 m (2,790 ft)

Population (2021)
  - Community: 126
- Time zone: UTC+2 (EET)
  - Summer (DST): UTC+3 (EEST)
- Vehicle registration: ΙΝ

Pyrsogianni (Greek: Πυρσόγιαννη) is a village in the Ioannina regional unit, northern Greece. It is situated on a mountain slope on the right bank of the river Sarantaporos. It is in the municipal unit of Mastorochoria, and it was the seat of the former municipality Mastorochoria. The Greek National Road 20 (Ioannina - Konitsa - Kozani) passes east of the village. It is 4 km northwest of Kastaniani, 20 km northeast of Konitsa and 60 km north of Ioannina.

== Population ==
Historical population
Year	Pop.	±%
1981	381	—
1991	293	−23.1%
2001	219	−25.3%
2011	119	−45.7%
2021	126	+5.9%

== About the village ==
The village includes the town hall of the Municipality of Mastorochoria and the Police Station of the region (mostly devoted to border guard duties). Visitors to the village will find also restaurants and coffee shops. The central spot of the village is the Pyrsogianni Hotel, which was built with the donations of the villagers. "The Brotherhood of Pyrsogianni" is a local organization that has to demonstrate remarkable projects. The most important sight of the village is the stone-built church of Agios Georgios, with an impressive bell tower. We should not forget also the new Ethnological Museum of Stonemasons, which is housed on the ground floor of the old stone school that was built in 1927.

== See also ==
- List of settlements in the Ioannina regional unit
