= Morava Highlands =

Mountain range in Albania

Morava
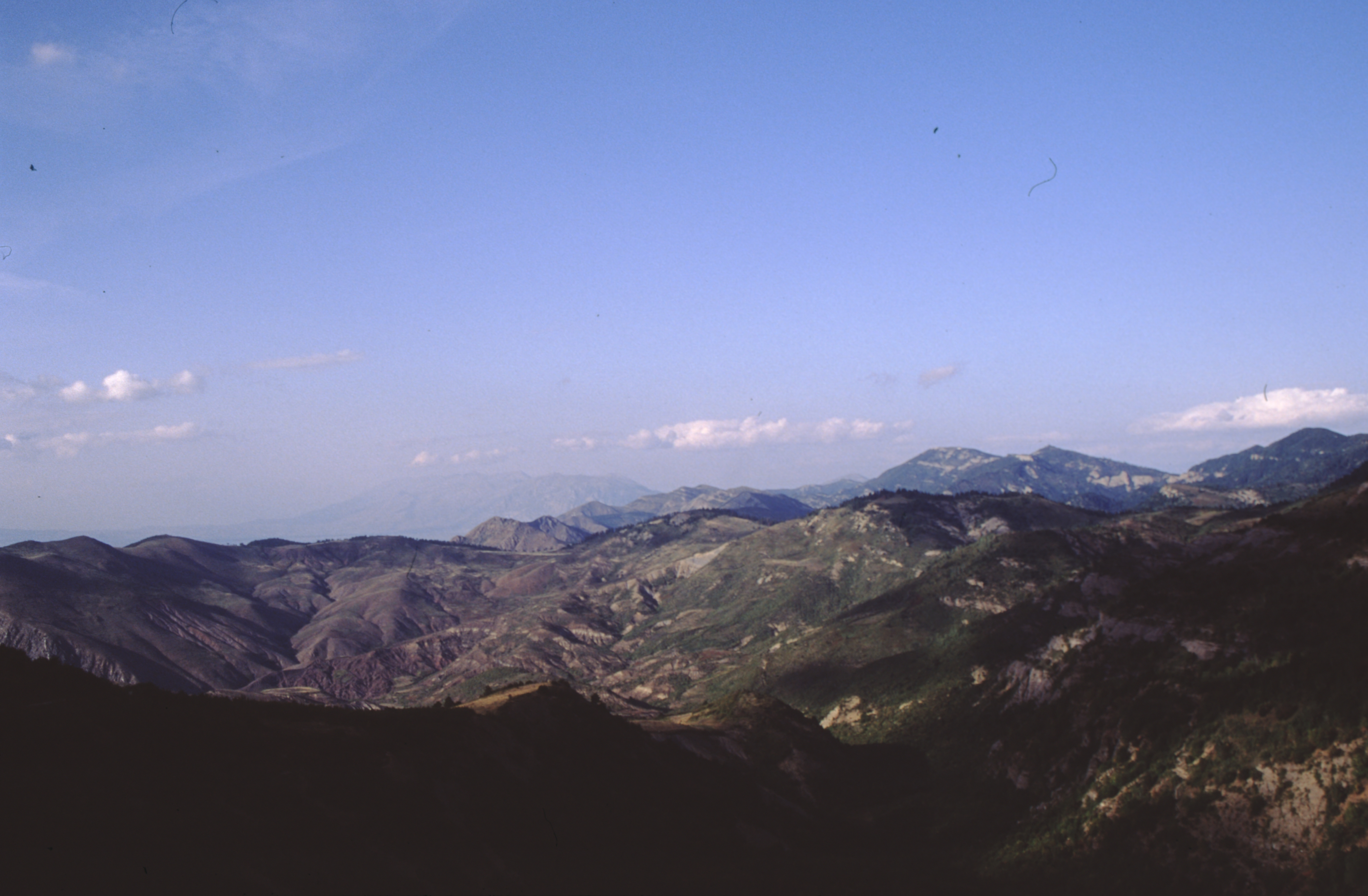

Highest point
- Peak: Maja e Badaroshës
- Elevation: 2,042 m (6,699 ft)
- Coordinates: 40°29′02″N 20°52′52″E

Geography
- Location within Albania
- Country: Albania
- Region: Southern Mountain Region
- Municipality: Korçë
- Parent range: Vargmali i Moravës

Geology
- Mountain type: mountain range
- Rock type(s): sandstone, molasse

Morava is a mountain range in southeastern Albania, situated east of the municipality of Korçë. Its highest point, Maja e Badaroshës, rises at 2,042 m (6,699 ft) above sea level. The range is approximately 30 km long and 10 km wide.

== Geology ==
Morava lies between the Devoll Plain to the east and the Korçë Plain to the west. To the north it is bounded by the Cangonj Gorge and to the south by Qafa e Kazanit, which separates it from the Gramoz massif. Most of the range lies between 1,000 and 1,500 m in elevation, with several prominent peaks, including Maja e Lartë (1,878 m) and Guri i Capit (1,573 m).

The Morava range is composed mainly of deltaic, sandstone and conglomeratic molasse deposits, which rest on ultrabasic magmatic rocks. This geological structure has contributed to the mountain's varied relief and erosion patterns.

Several streams originate from here, flowing toward the Devoll and Osum rivers.

== Biodiversity ==
Vegetation on the western slopes is relatively sparse, though extensive reforestation efforts have been carried out in recent decades. The eastern slopes support richer forests, dominated by beech, pine and fir. Wildlife includes species such as the brown bear, wild boar and roe deer.

== Attractions ==
Tourist and winter sports centers have been developed in the mountain area, notably in Dardhë and Bozdovec. At the western foothills lies the Mborje–Drenovë coal deposit, while the eastern foothills near Ziçisht host deposits of silica sands used in glass production.

== See also ==
- List of mountains in Albania
