= Panagiotis Chatzinikou =

Greek merchant (1707–1797)

Panagiotis Chatzinikou (Greek: Παναγιώτης Χατζηνίκου) was a Greek merchant and benefactor of the 18th century.

== Biography ==
He was born in 1707 in Konitsa, but moved to Ioannina in a young age, as his father, Nikolaos Chatzinikou, was a fur merchant and would have better profits there. Panagiotis followed his father's job and became an important merchant of the region. In around 1750, a 14 year old boy, Zois Kaplanis (1736-1806) after being expelled from his village in the modern day municipal unit of Pasaronas, was accepted by Chatzinikou in his home and appreciating his character and hard work, he made him partner in many businesses. In 1754, they both moved to Bucharest where Chatzinikou took the management of the business and Kaplanis the travels. But in around 1778, they stopped their business and Chatzinikou started giving his holdings to his nephew, Panos. He later moved to Brașov, where he died in 1796 and got buried in the Greek cemetery of the city, near the Greek Orthodox Church of Trinity, which was founded in 1787 by his contribution. With his death, most of his fortune was given to the poor and institutions. During this period, Kaplanis became a notable benefactor, founding important schools like the Kaplaneios School.
