= Molista =

Molista Μόλιστα
- Community
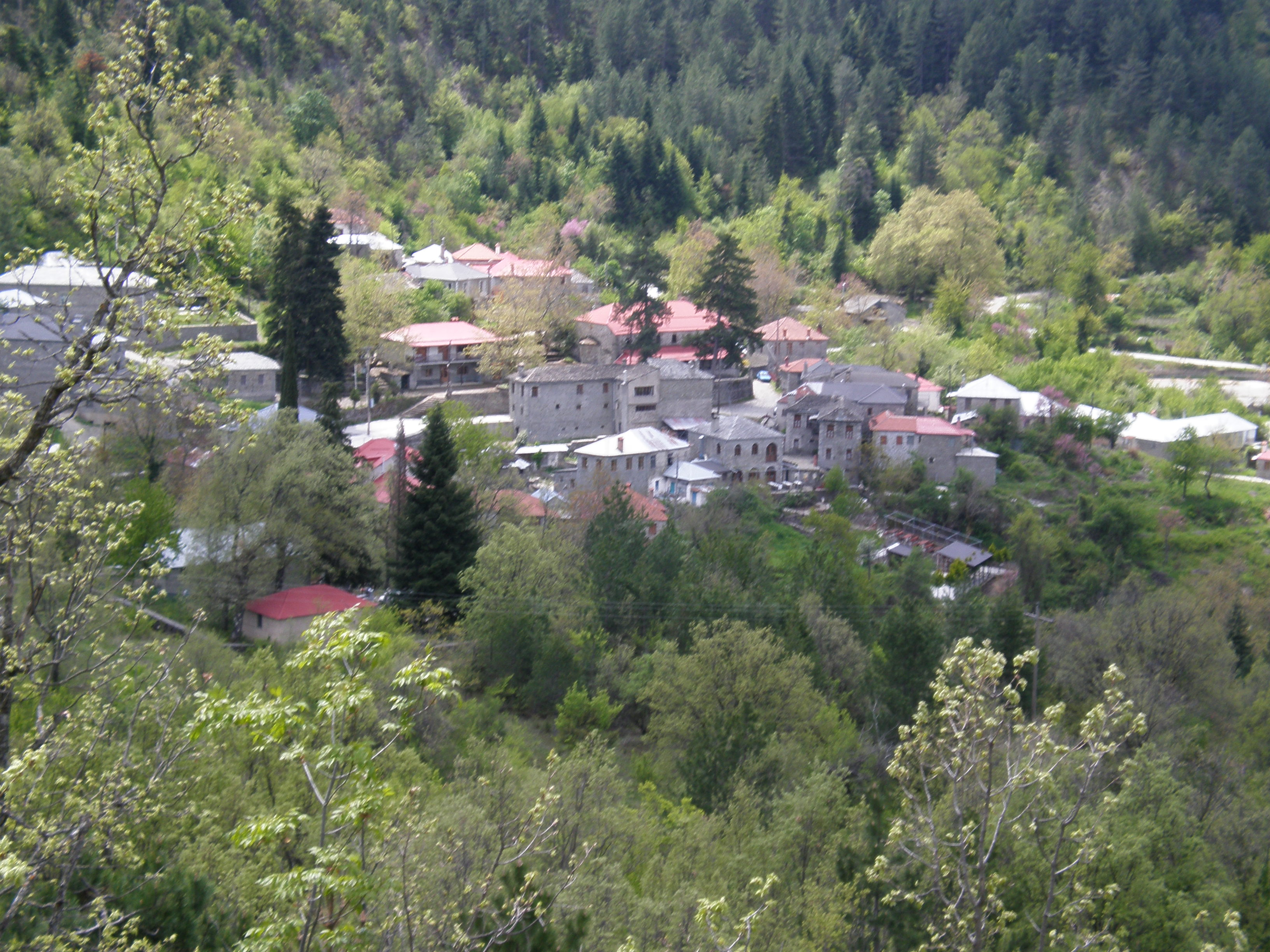

- Location within Greece
- Coordinates: 40°7.5′N 20°48.9′E
- Country: Greece
- Administrative region: Epirus
- Regional unit: Ioannina
- Municipality: Konitsa
- Municipal unit: Konitsa

Population (2021)
  - Community: 15
- Time zone: UTC+2 (EET)
  - Summer (DST): UTC+3 (EEST)
- Vehicle registration: ΙΝ

Molista (Greek: Μόλιστα, before 1928: Μεσαριά - Mesaria) is a settlement in the Ioannina regional unit in Epirus, Greece. It is situated on the northwestern slope of Smolikas, between the villages Monastiri to the southwest and Gannadio to the northeast. It is part of the municipality of Konitsa. The EO20 road (Ioannina–Konitsa–Kozani) is approximately 5 km west. The village is almost uninhabited during the winter months.

== Population ==
Historical population
Year	Pop.	±%
1981	107	—
1991	86	−19.6%
2001	69	−19.8%
2011	23	−66.7%
2021	15	−34.8%

== History ==
It is unknown when the village was founded. In the area around 3,000 years old lekythoi containing ashes have been found by archeologists. This may indicate that the first inhabitants were Molossians. Others claim that the village was settled later, during the 17th century. Molista was part of the Ottoman Empire until 1913, when it came to Greece.

== See also ==
- List of settlements in the Ioannina regional unit
