= Mastorochoria =

Municipal unit in Epirus, Greece

Mastorochoria Μαστοροχώρια
- Municipal unit
- Location within the regional unit

- Location within Greece
- Coordinates: 40°13′N 20°49′E
- Country: Greece
- Administrative region: Epirus
- Regional unit: Ioannina
- Municipality: Konitsa

Area
  - Municipal unit: 271.16 km^{2} (104.70 sq mi)
- Elevation: 922 m (3,025 ft)

Population (2021)
  - Municipal unit: 851
  - Municipal unit density: 3.14/km^{2} (8.13/sq mi)
- Time zone: UTC+2 (EET)
  - Summer (DST): UTC+3 (EEST)
- Vehicle registration: ΙΝ
- Website: www.mastorohoria.gr

Mastorochoria (Greek: Μαστοροχώρια) is a former municipality in the Ioannina regional unit, Epirus, Greece. Since the 2011 local government reform it is part of the municipality Konitsa, of which it is a municipal unit. The municipal unit has an area of 271.160 km^{2}. Population 851 (2021). The seat of the municipality was in Pyrsogianni.

== Subdivisions ==
The municipal unit Mastorochoria is subdivided into the following communities (constituent villages in brackets):

- Pyrsogianni
- Asimochori
- Vourmpiani
- Gorgopotamos
- Drosopigi
- Kastaniani
- Kefalochori
- Lagkada
- Oxya (Oxya, Theotokos)
- Plagia
- Plikati
- Chionades
