= Sarantaporos (Epirus) =

River in Albania

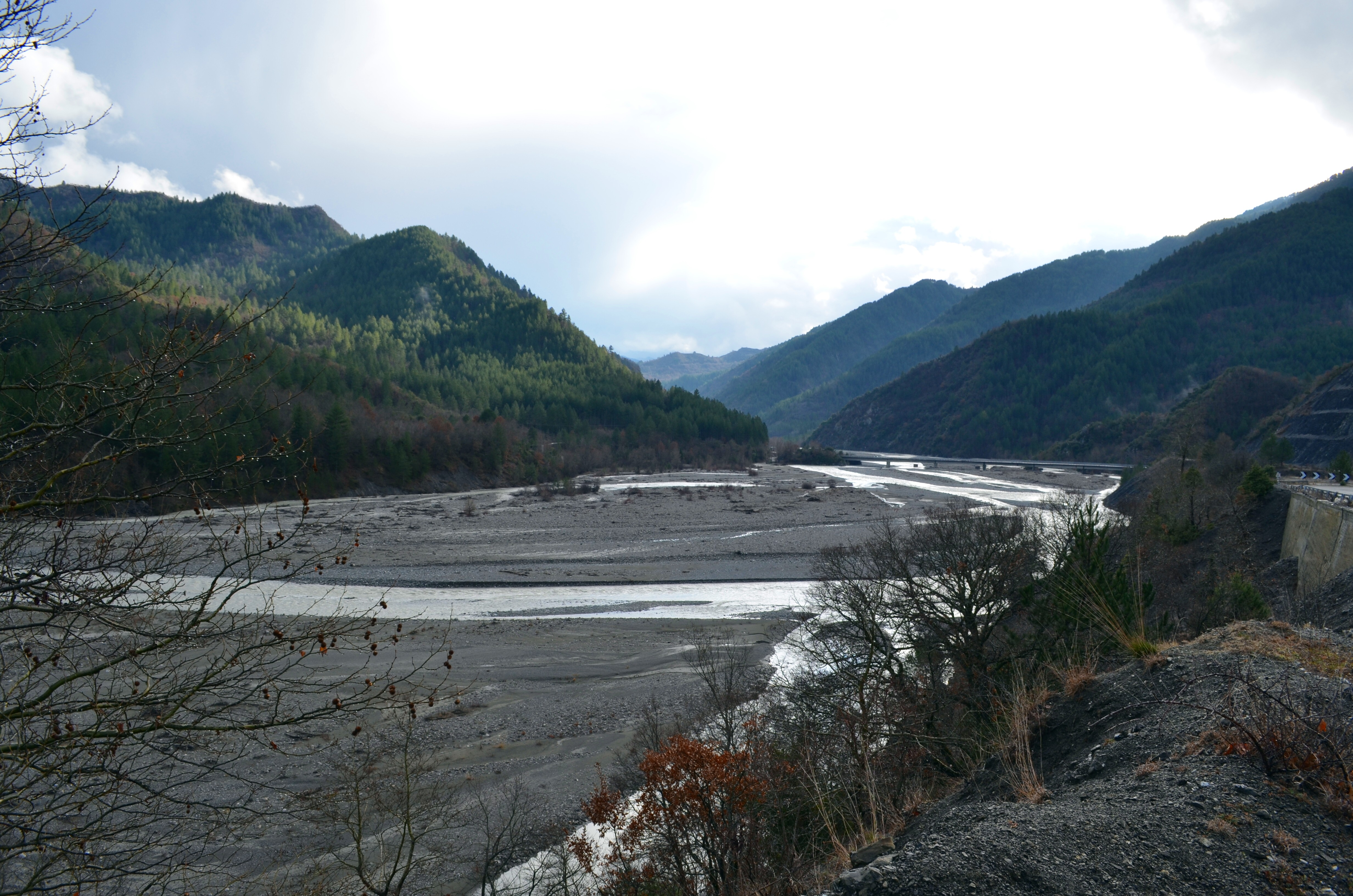
- Sarantaporos near Pyrsogianni

Location
- Countries: Albania and Greece

Physical characteristics
- Source
  - location: Pindus, Greece
- Mouth
  - location: Vjosa
  - coordinates: 40°4′18″N 20°35′17″E
- Length: 50 km (31 mi)
- Basin size: 870 km^{2} (340 sq mi)
- Discharge
  - average: 6.93 m^{3}/s (245 cu ft/s)

Basin features
- Progression: Vjosë→ Adriatic Sea

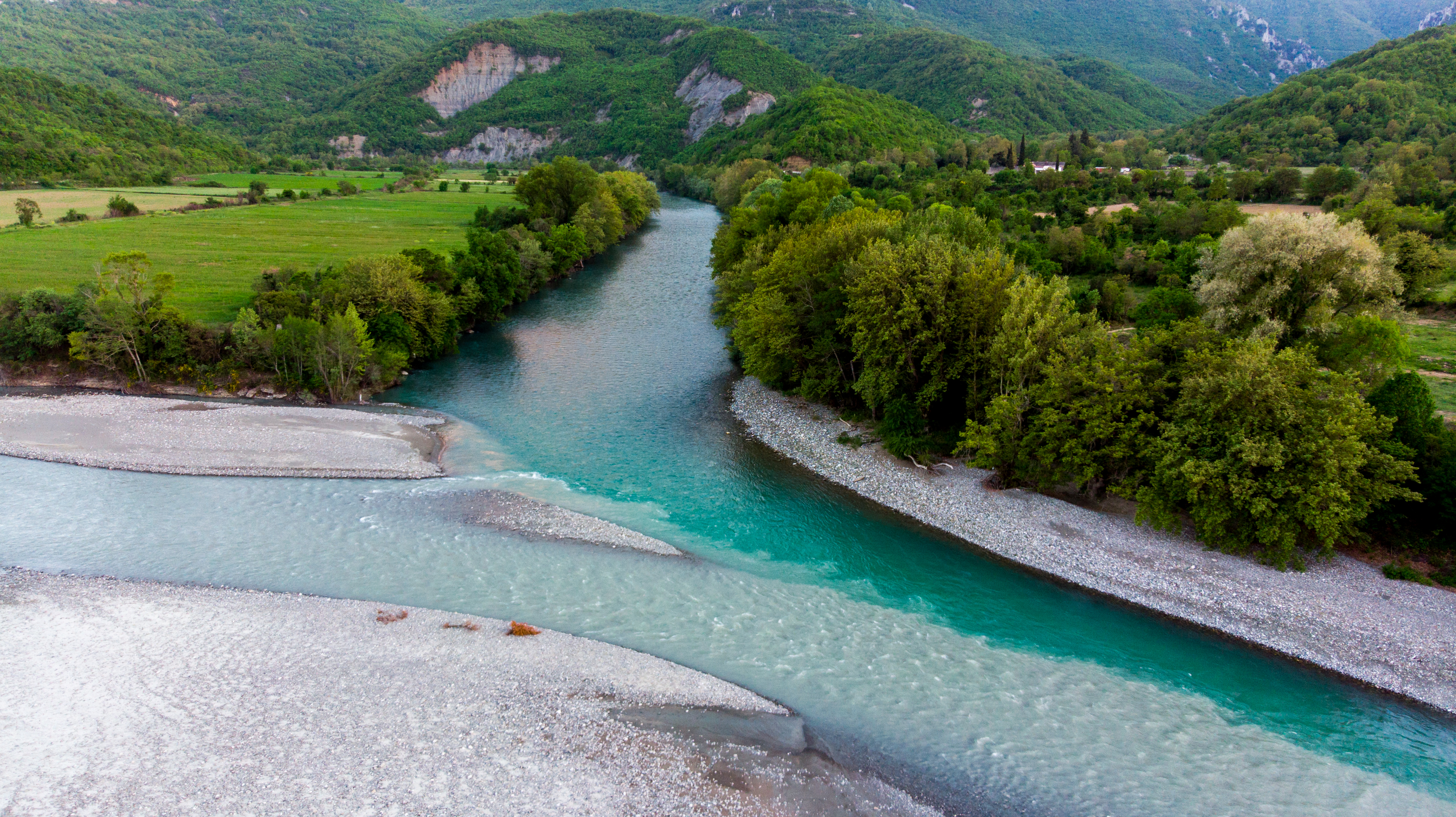
Confluence of Sarantaporos (left) and Vjosa

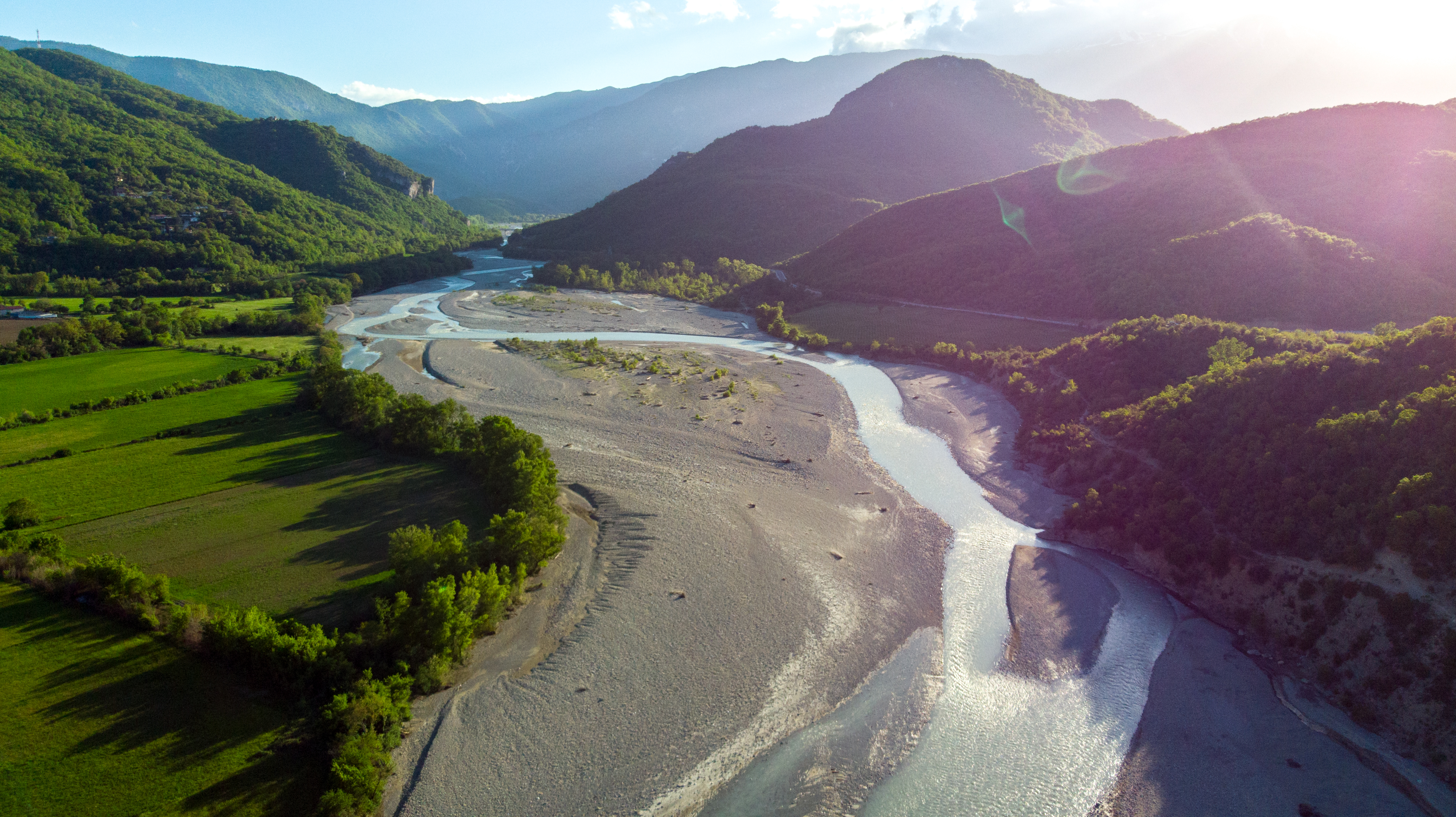
Sarantaporos in its lower course

The Sarantaporos (Greek: Σαραντάπορος, Albanian: Sarandapor) is a river in northwestern Greece and southern Albania. It is a right tributary of the river Vjosa, which flows into the Adriatic Sea. Its length is 50 km (31 mi), of which the final approx. 10 km (6.2 mi) form the border between Greece and Albania. Its source is between the mountain ranges Gramos and Voio, in the Kastoria regional unit. The Sarantaporos flows through the municipal units Arrenes, Mastorochoria and Konitsa in Greece, and the municipalities Qendër Leskovik and Çarshovë in Albania. Its basin area is 870 km^{2} (340 sq mi), and its year-average discharge is 6.93 m^{3} (245 cu ft) per second.

== See also ==
- List of rivers of Greece
- List of rivers of Albania
