= Gramos =

Mountain on the Albanian-Greek border

- Gramoz
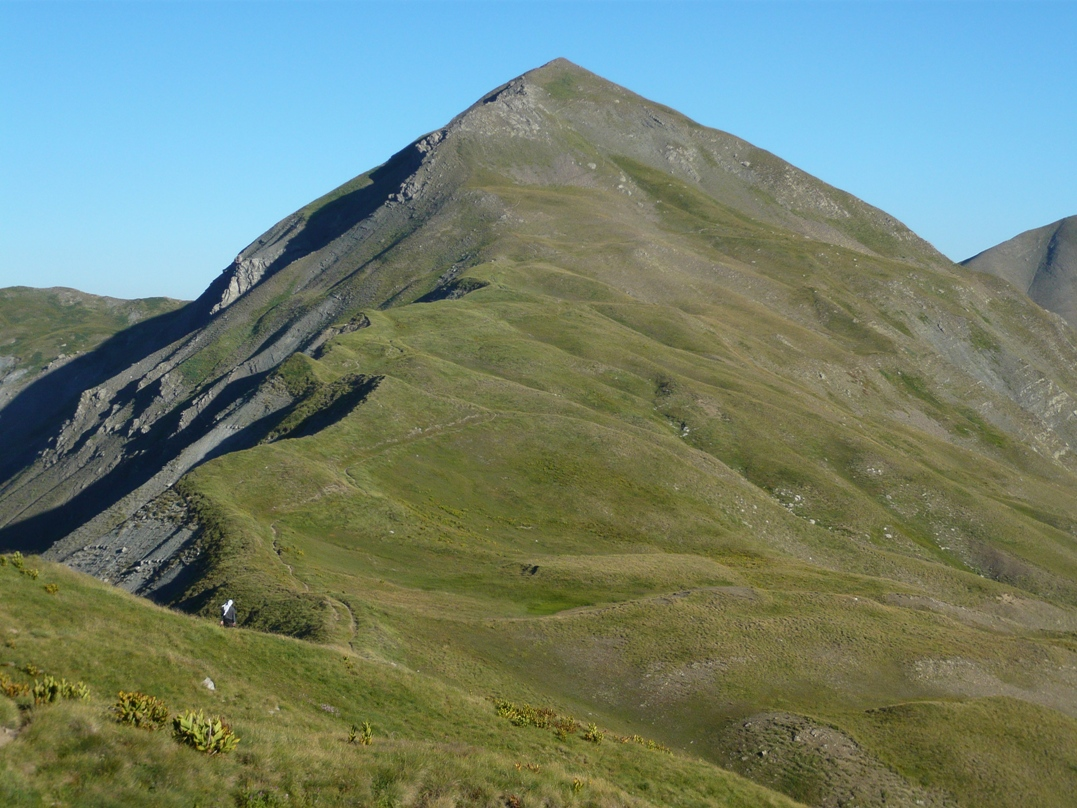
- View of the southern face of Gramos

Highest point
- Elevation: 2,523 m (8,278 ft)
- Prominence: 1,303 m (4,275 ft)
- Isolation: 1.4 km (0.87 mi)
- Listing: Ribu
- Coordinates: 40°20′54″N 20°46′46″E

Geography
- Location within Albania Location within Greece
- Countries: Albania; Greece
- Region: Southern Mountain Region
- Municipality: Kolonjë, Konitsa, Nestorio
- Parent range: Moravë-Mali i Vashës

Geology
- Rock age: Paleogene
- Mountain type: mountain chain
- Rock type(s): flysch, limestone

Gramos (Greek: Γράμος or Γράμμος; Albanian: Gramoz, Mali i Gramozit; Aromanian: Gramosta, Gramusta, Yramos or Yramustea) is a mountain chain situated on the border of Albania and Greece. Part of the larger northern Pindus mountain range, its highest peak, Maja e Çukapeçit, rises at an elevation of 2,523 m (8,278 ft).

== Geography ==
From the Albanian side, Gramos lies on the eastern edge of Kolonjë municipality, bounded in the northwest by the Morava mountain and in the southeast by Kamenik. It continues beyond the state border, into Greece, extending along the boundaries of Ioannina and Kastoria regional units, neighboured by the Smolikas chain to the south and Voio to the east.

== Geology ==
The mountain mass consists mainly of paleogene flysch, with smaller amounts of lower flysch and limestone, resulting in a complex tectonic structure. Above heights of 1,500–1,600 m (4,900–5,200 ft), various glacial features such as cirques and glacial valleys can be observed. The western and northwestern slopes of the mountain give rise to various branches of the Osum and Devoll rivers. Conversely, the northeastern and southern slopes are drained by the branches of Aliakmonas and Sarantaporos rivers.

== Biodiversity ==
Alpine meadows thrive in the northern and central regions, while the southern part is characterized by lush beech and conifer forests.

== See also ==
- List of mountains in Albania
- List of mountains in Greece
