= Konitsa =

Konitsa Κόνιτσα
- Municipality
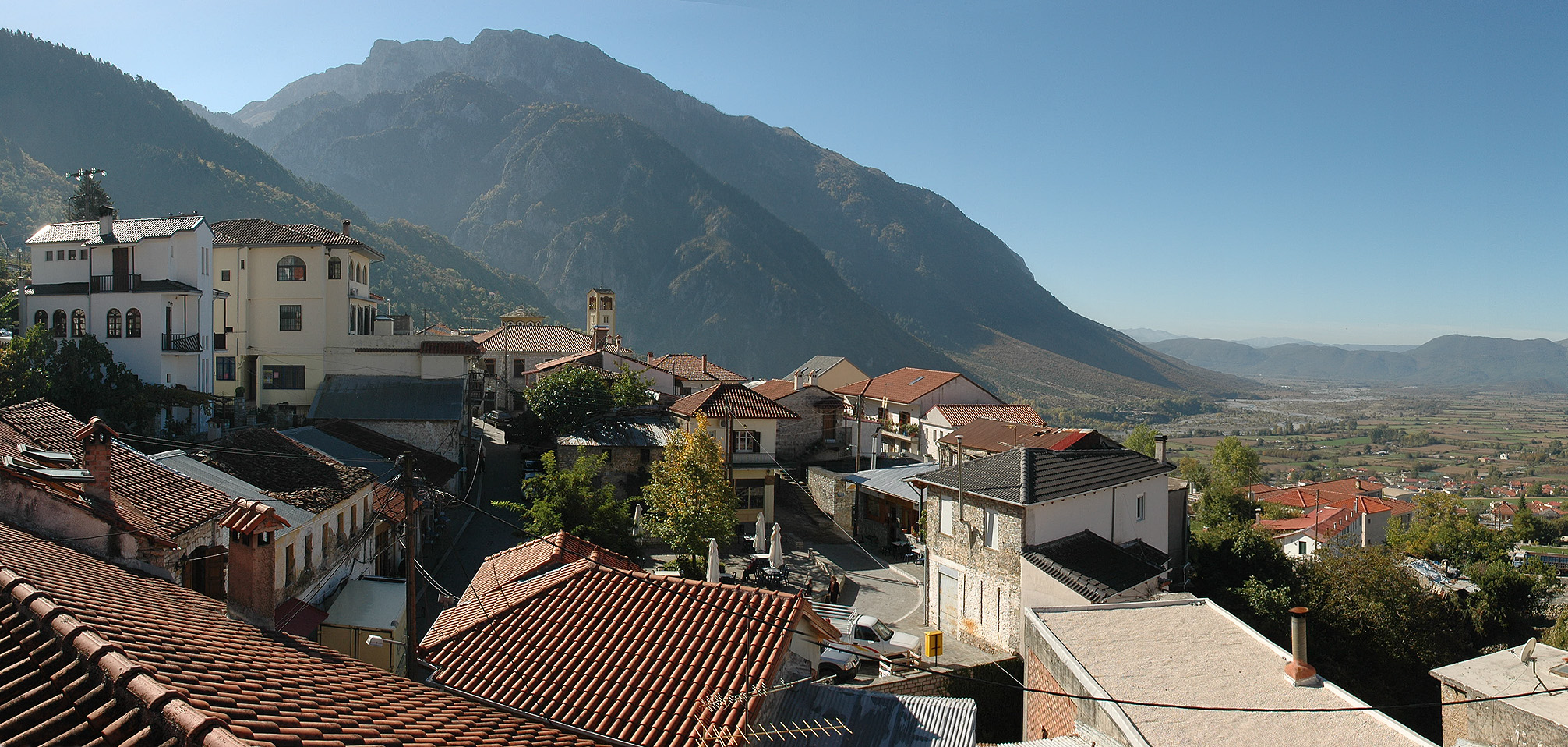
- View of Konitsa.

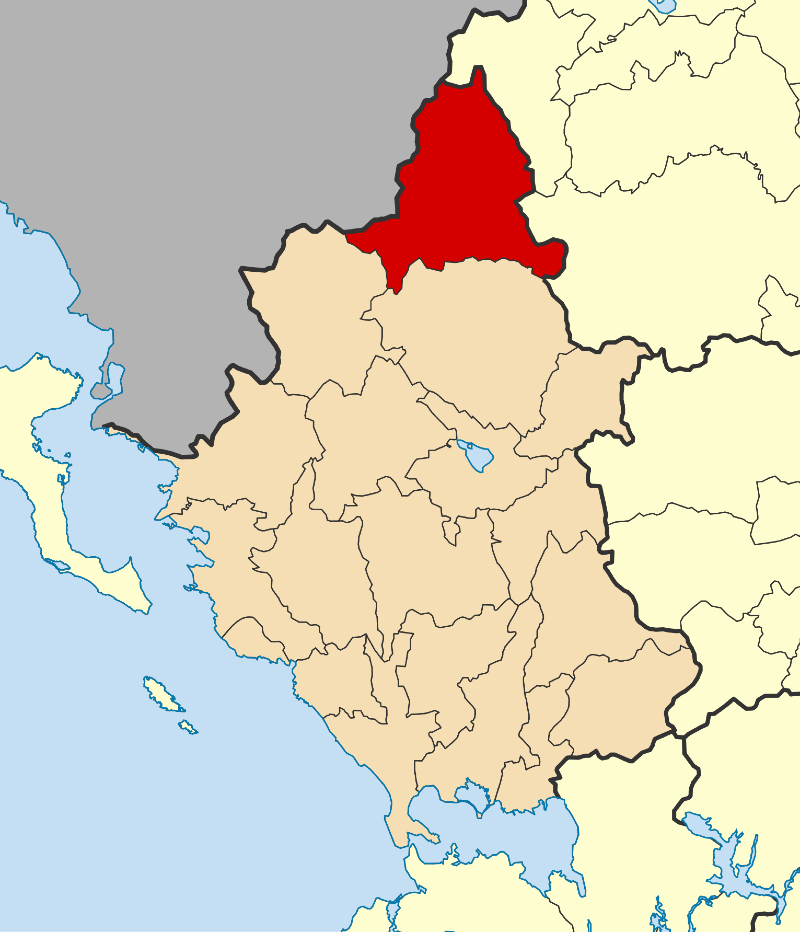

- Location within Greece
- Coordinates: 40°3′N 20°45′E
- Country: Greece
- Administrative region: Epirus
- Regional unit: Ioannina

Area
  - Municipality: 951.2 km^{2} (367.3 sq mi)
  - Municipal unit: 542.5 km^{2} (209.5 sq mi)
  - Community: 54.506 km^{2} (21.045 sq mi)
- Elevation: 600 m (2,000 ft)

Population (2021)
  - Municipality: 5,296
  - Density: 5.568/km^{2} (14.42/sq mi)
  - Municipal unit: 3,982
  - Municipal unit density: 7.340/km^{2} (19.01/sq mi)
  - Community: 2,638
  - Community density: 48.40/km^{2} (125.4/sq mi)
- Time zone: UTC+2 (EET)
  - Summer (DST): UTC+3 (EEST)
- Postal code: 441 00
- Area code: 26550
- Vehicle registration: ΙΝ

Konitsa (Greek: Κόνιτσα, see also names in other languages) is a town of Ioannina in Epirus, Greece. It is located north of the capital Ioannina and near the Albanian border. Konitsa lies northeast of a group of villages known as the Zagorochoria. The town was built amphitheatrically-shaped on a mountain slope of the Pindos mountain range from where it overlooks the valley where the river Aoos meets the river Voidomatis.

Konitsa acts as a regional hub for several small villages of Pindos, and features many shops, schools and a public medical center. Primary aspects of the economy are agriculture and tourism; it is a popular starting point for tourists and hikers who want to explore the Pindos mountains, or who want to go rafting in the river Aoos or parapenting. Due to Konitsa's closeness to places of particular interest, such as the Vikos–Aoös National Park, which includes the Vikos Gorge, the Aoos Gorge and the Tymfi mountains, where the Vikos spring water brand is collected, the Dragonlakes of Tymfi and Smolikas and the sulfur baths of Kavasila, contributed to the increase of tourism in the region.

== Name ==
The town itself is known in Greek as Kónitsa (Κόνιτσα), the villages surrounding it are often known as the Konitsochoria, meaning "the villages of Konitsa". The town is known in Bulgarian as Коница (Konitsa), Albanian as Konicë, in Aromanian as Cunitsã, and in Turkish as Koniçe.

There are two main theories regarding the etymology of the name. The first states that the city takes its name from an ancient Epirote city named Knossos, which was located near modern-day Konitsa. According to this theory, the name is a corruption: Knossos -> Konissos -> Konissa -> Konitsa. The other theory states that the name is Slavic, from Koni (horse) and Tza (land), meaning horseland. According to a third theory, the name comes from a local lord named Konis who allegedly built a castle in the city.

== History ==
During the Middle Bronze Age (2100–1900 BC) the region of Konitsa was inhabited by Proto-Greek populations. Latter in classical antiquity, the area was part of the territory of the Molossians. At the time of the reign of Pyrrhus of Epirus (297–272 BC) a number of forts existed in strategically important positions.

The town of Konitsa is recorded for the first time under its modern name in the Chronicle of Ioannina of 1380. The chronicle mentioned that the defences of the castle of Konitsa were strengthened by the local Despot of Epirus, due to an imminent attack. In the 15th century, Konitsa came under Ottoman rule and became part of the Sanjak of Ioannina. The town was the administrative centre of a kaza (Ottoman district) which according to the Ottoman General Census of 1881/1882 had a total population of 16,570, consisting of 15,838 Orthodox Greeks, 1,429 Muslims and 3 Jews.

During the Ottoman period some local Greek landowners converted to Islam to preserve their holdings. These converts formed a powerful and influential group in the area, living in the upper part of Konitsa alongside the Christians. The upper part of Konitsa is the oldest and most populated part of the Konitsa region, while the lower part is the newest and least populated. While Christians were a majority in the upper part of Konitsa, the lower part of Konitsa had a Muslim majority, consisting mostly of Muslim Albanian refugees from nearby settlements and regions like Leskovik, Kolonjë and Frashër (today located in Albania) who became agricultural laborers. Some of the local Greek elites had been Islamised there in order to preserve their social status. The native Muslim and Christian population exclusively spoke Greek in the two neighborhoods of the town.

A Greek school was operating already from the end of the 18th century under Georgios Mostras, student of Balanos Vasilopoulos. Greek education was flourishing and in 1906 the kaza of Konitsa had 31 schools and 1,036 pupils. The functioning of the school was interrupted during the turbulent times of Ali Pasha's rule, however soon after it reopened following the initiative of Kosmas Thesprotos, a student of Athanasios Psalidas. During the Greek War of Independence (1821–1830) a Greek national identity was evident among local Muslims too. During the 19th century until the early 20th century (late Ottoman period), the tekke of Konitsa, similarly to other Albanian Bektashi tekkes, was a covert center of culture, learning and tolerance, but also Albanian national activism against the Ottoman Empire. In that period some Konitsa residents developed a national consciousness resulting in individuals such as Faik Konitza and Mehmet Konica becoming important figures in the Albanian national movement. Apart from a small number of Albanian families, the local Muslim community had Greek as its mother tongue.

Albanian speech was limited to the local Ottoman officials. On the other hand, the local Greek population displayed tolerance towards actions by the Albanians that did not reveal chauvinist inclinations. In c. 1856 the town had a Muslim majority population of 62% and was mainly Greek-speaking, while the kaza had a Christian majority. During the late 19th century Konitsa had a population of 7,000 of whom 4,000 were Christians and 3,000 Muslims.

In 1924 Konitsa was a small town that consisted of a total of 800 dwellings, 200 of which were considered Albanian or Turkish. As a result of the population exchange agreement of 1923 between Greece and Turkey, roughly two-thirds of Konitsa's Muslims, were considered "Turks by origin" and left for Turkey in 1925. Another part moved to Albania. They were replaced with around 1,000 Greeks from Cappadocia.

In early November 1940, during World War II, the town witnessed a first short-term occupation by units from Fascist Italy. The occupation units that entered Konitsa consisted of approximately 150 Muslim Albanians and 12 Italian soldiers, under the guidance of an Italian officer. They perpetrated lootings and broke into shops. In November 14, with the withdrawal of the Italians from the area, they proceeded to arrests and kidnappings of the local population.

In the following Greek Civil War (1946–1949) the surrounding region became a major battleground, while in December 1947 communist guerrilla units unsuccessfully tried to capture the town. Almost all buildings inhabited by Muslim Albanians in Konitsa were destroyed during World War II warfare. The communists guerrillas had the opportunity to withdraw and regroup to the People's Republic of Albania and then launch repeated attacks against Konitsa, but were decisively defeated by the Greek army. During the 1950s the Muslim population numbered around 70 families and they further decreased over time to a few families due to conversions to Christianity or migration to their Muslim correligionists in Greek Thrace, in both cases for marriage.

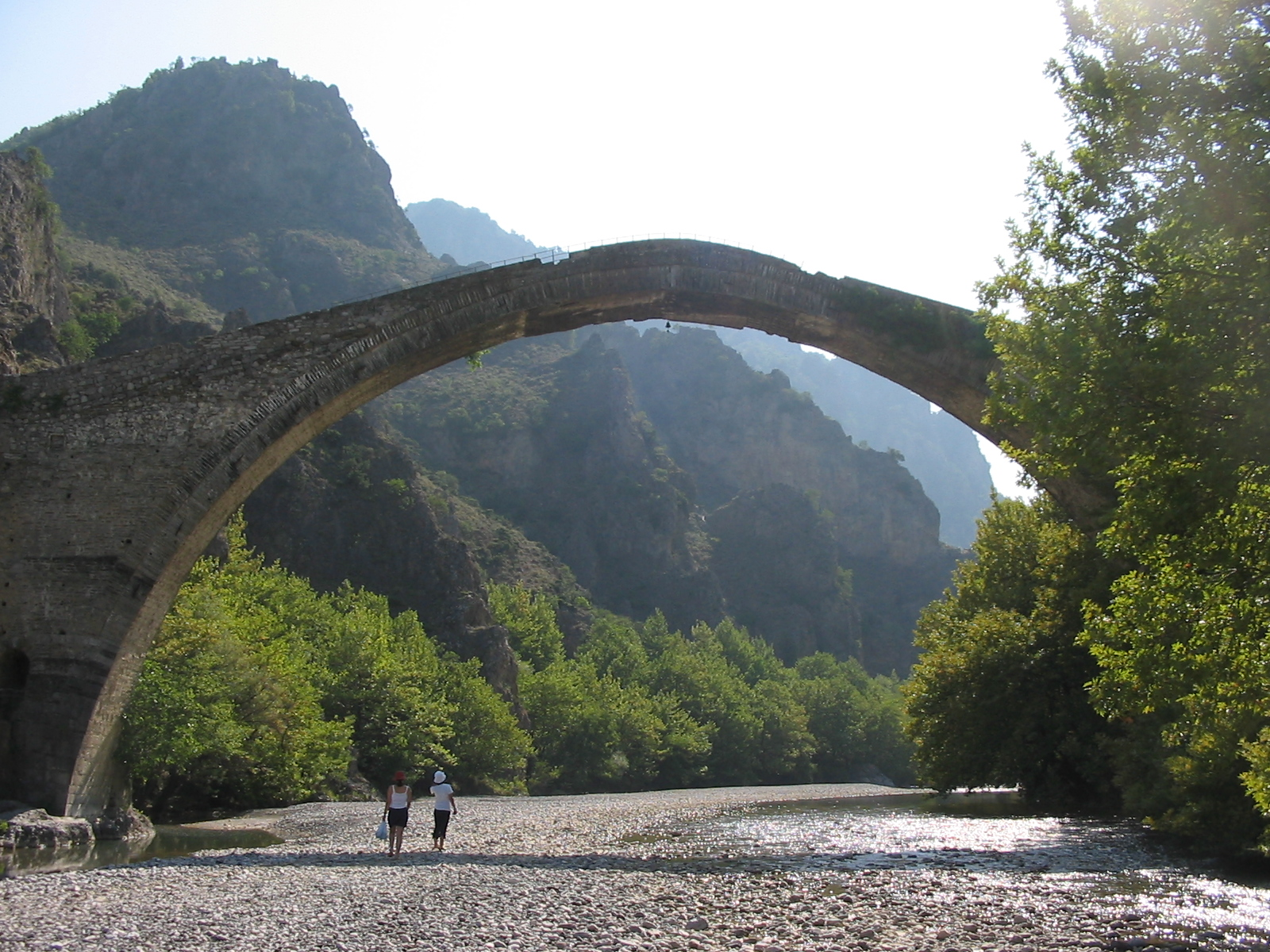
Ottoman era bridge in Konitsa, built 1870

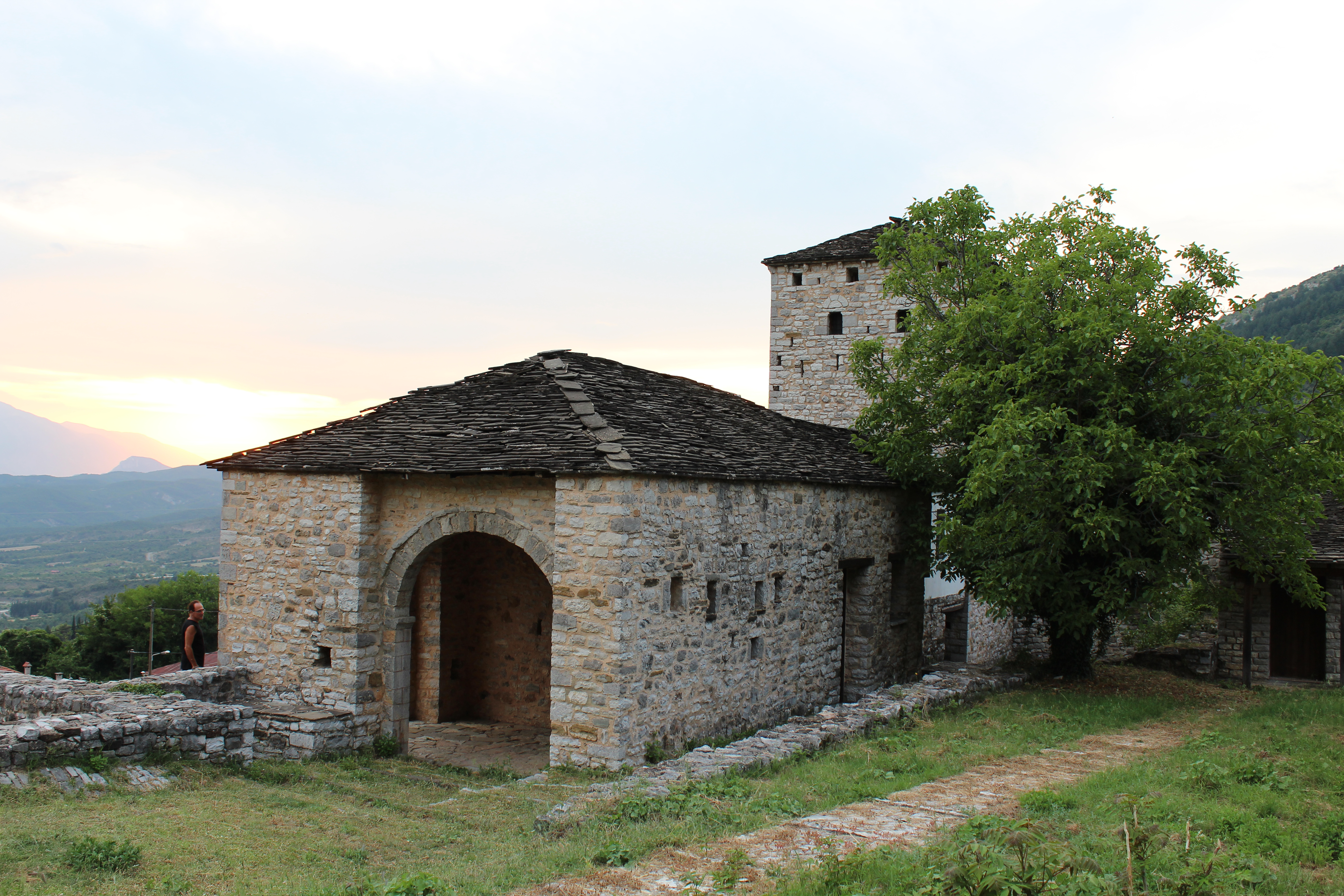
Old mansion belonging to Ali Pasha's mother Hamko

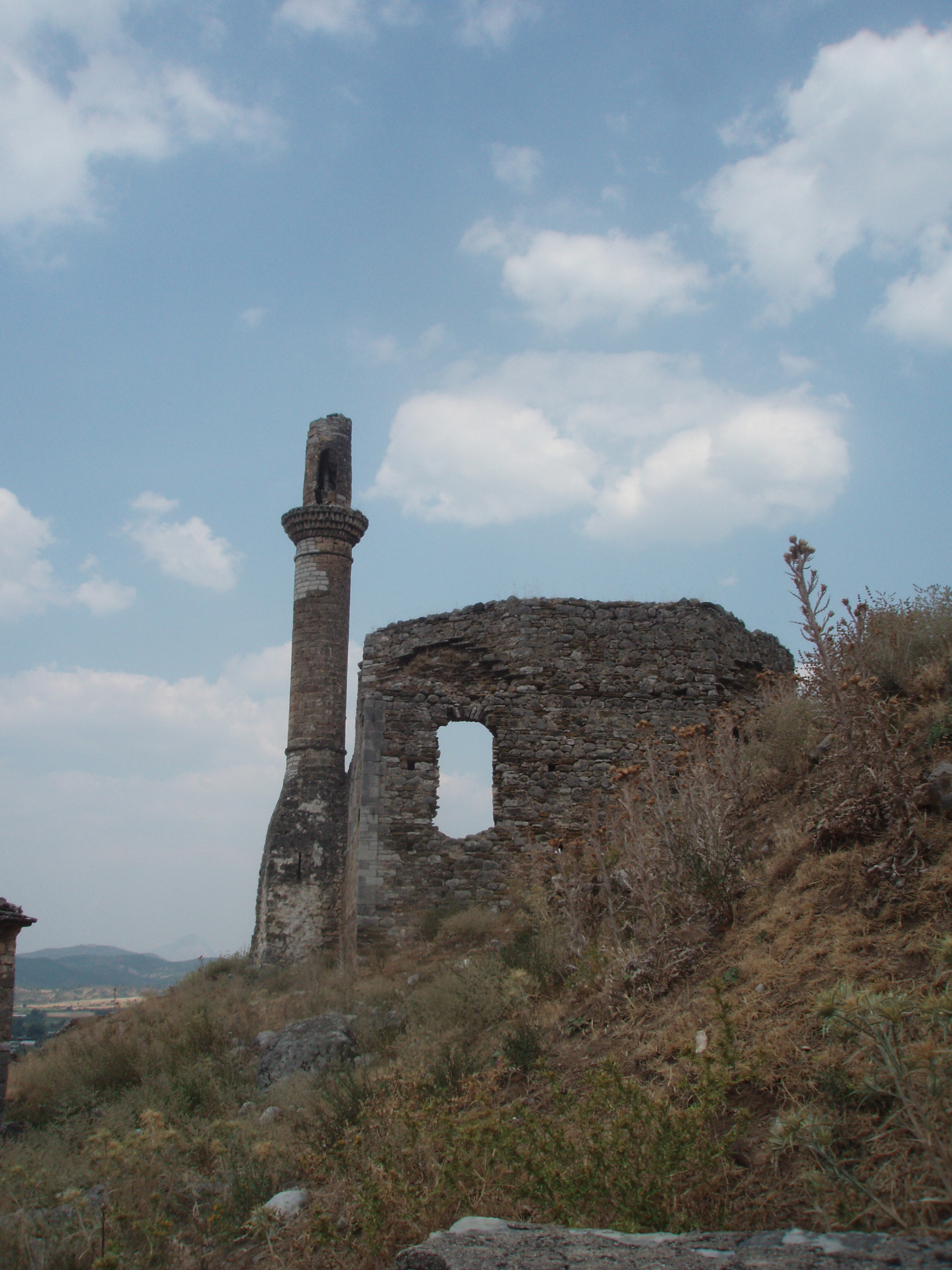
Ruins of an Ottoman mosque in Konitsa

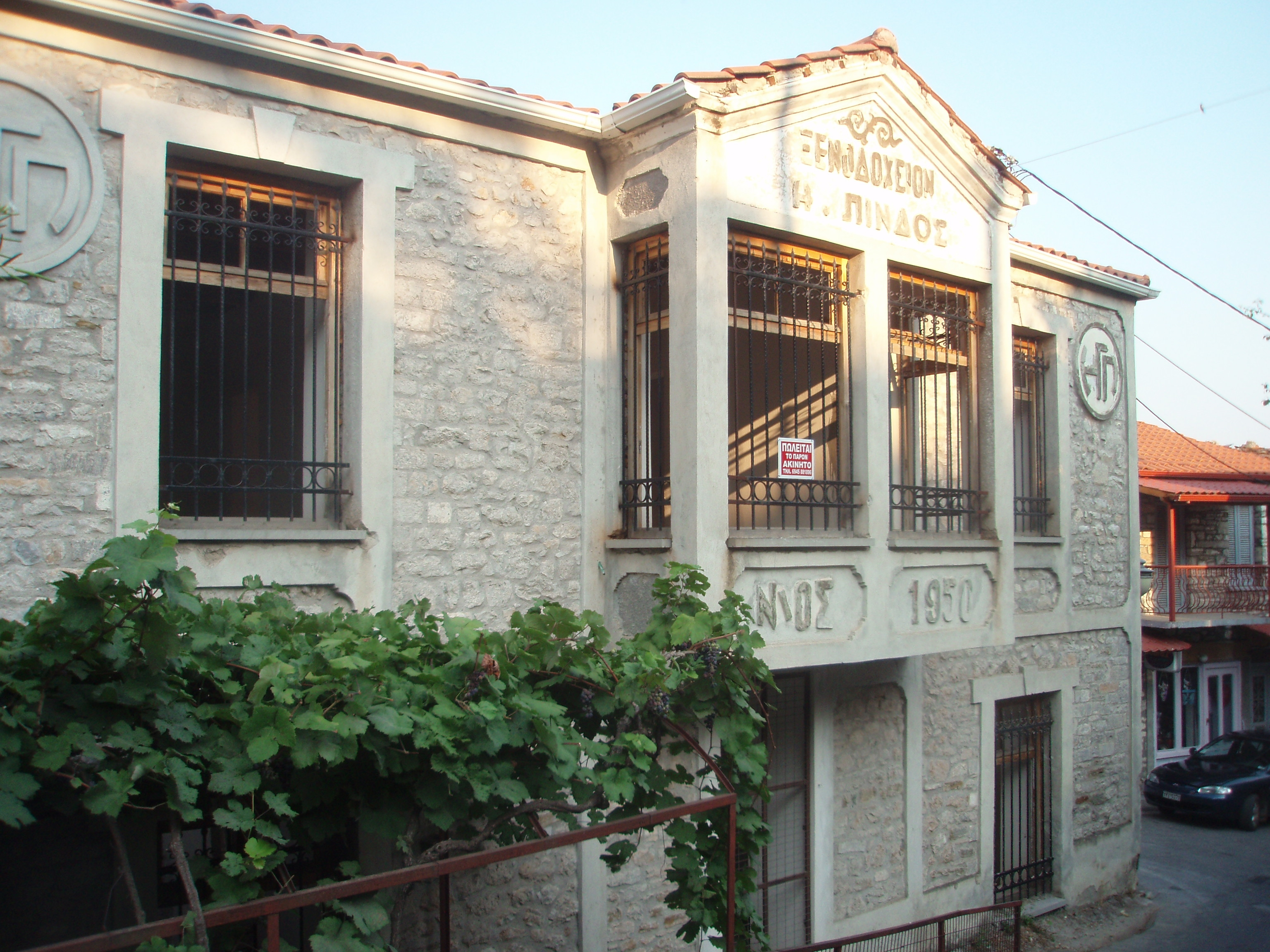
The Pindus hotel (now abandoned) in Konitsa

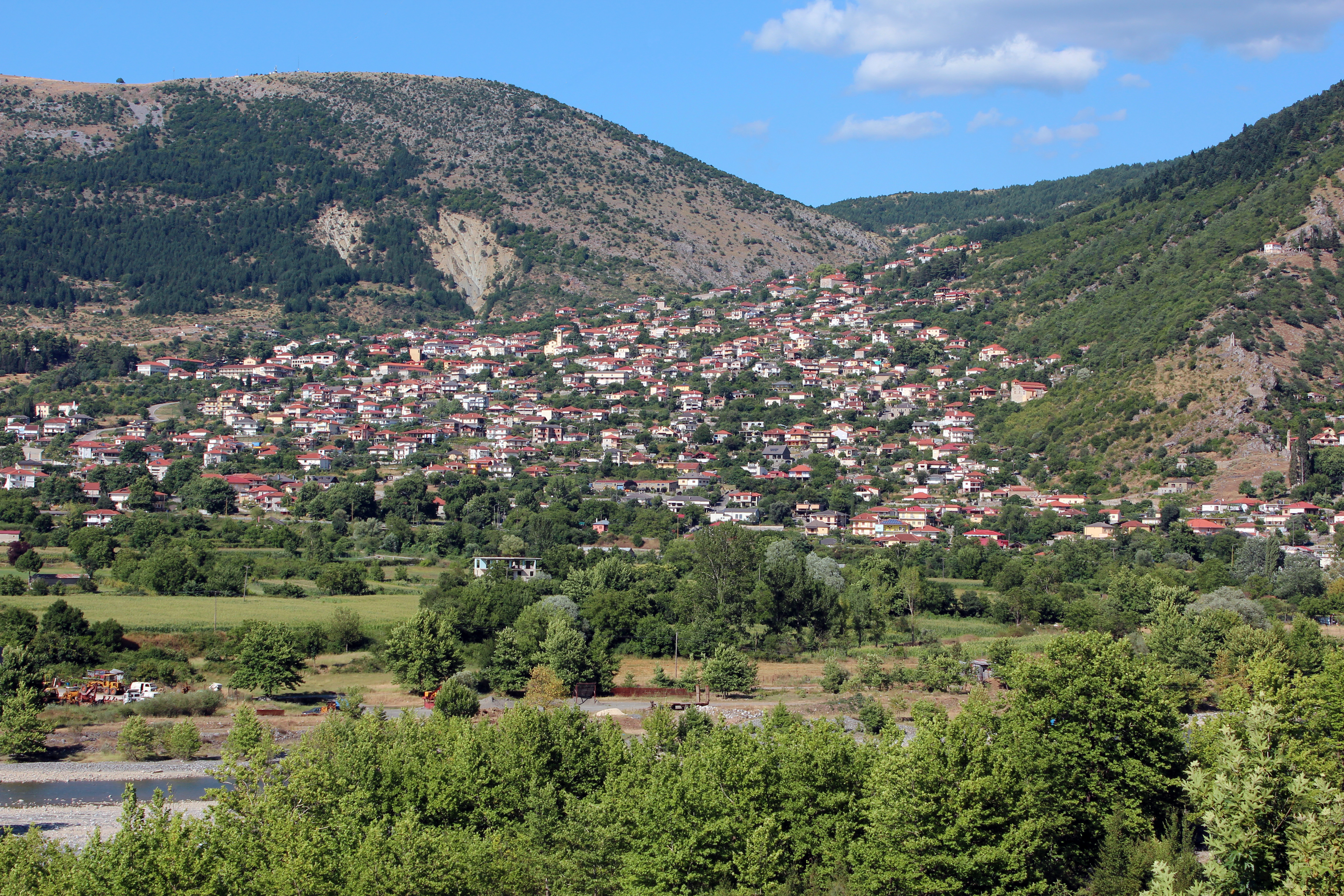
Panoramic view of Konitsa

== Municipality ==
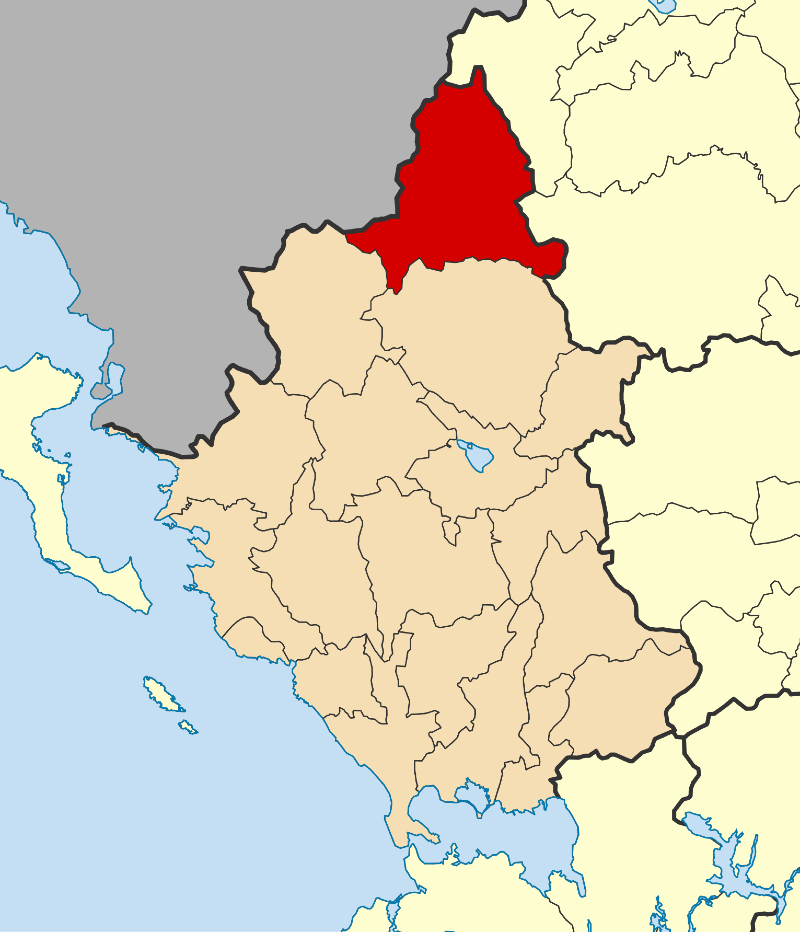
Konitsa municipality

The present municipality Konitsa was formed at the 2011 local government reform by the merger of the following 5 former municipalities, that became municipal units (constituent communities in brackets):

- Konitsa (Aetopetra, Agia Paraskevi, Agia Varvara, Aidonochori, Amarantos, Armata, Elefthero, Exochi, Gannadio, Iliorrachi, Kallithea, Kavasila, Kleidonia, Konitsa, Mazi, Melissopetra, Molista, Molyvdoskepastos, Monastiri, Nikanoras, Pades, Palaioselli, Pigi, Pournia, Pyrgos)
- Aetomilitsa
- Distrato
- Fourka
- Mastorochoria (Asimochori, Vourmpiani, Gorgopotamos, Drosopigi, Kallithea, Kastaniani, Kefalochori, Kleidonia, Lagkada, Oxya, Plagia, Plikati, Pyrsogianni, Chionades)

The Konitsa municipality has an area of 951.184 km^{2}, the Konitsa municipal unit has an area of 542.516 km^{2}, and the Konitsa community has an area of 54.506 km^{2}.

== Province ==
The province of Konitsa (Greek: Επαρχία Κόνιτσας) was one of the provinces of the Ioannina Prefecture. It had the same territory as the present municipality. It was abolished in 2006.

== Historical Demographics ==
Year	Town	Municipal unit	Municipality
1981	2,859	–	-
1991	2,858	6,572	–
2001	2,871	6,225	–
2011	2,942	4,632	6,362
2021	2,638	3,982	5,296

== Notable people ==
- Saint Paisios the Athonite (1924–1994), Greek Orthodox saint
- Panagiotis Chatzinikou (1707–1796), Greek benefactor and merchant
- Konstantinos Dovas (1898–1973), Prime Minister of Greece and Army general
- Saint John Vrachoritis (−1813), Greek Orthodox Saint
- Eleftherios Oikonomou (1956-), Greek politician and former Chief of the Greek Police
- Faik Konica (1875-1942), Albanian writer, linguist and ambassador of Albania in Washington, DC
- Mehmet Konica (1881-1948), twice Foreign Minister of Albania
- Janaq Paço (1914–1991), prominent 20th century Albanian sculptor
- Giannis Lymperopoulos, Greek professor and author
- Konstantis Pistiolis, Greek clarinet player and vocalist
- Hamko, Albanian mother of Ali Pasha of Ioannina

== Sources ==
- Vlachos Alexandros, Koliva Aikaterini (2013). Αποτύπωση και πρόταση επανάχρησης υπάρχοντος κτιρίου σε ξενώνα στην Κόνιτσα Ιωαννίνων [Mapping and proposal reuse of an existing building into a guesthouse in Konitsa] (Thesis). Piraeus University.
