= Tyria =

Tyria may refer to:

- Tyria (moth), a genus of moths in the family Erebidae
- Tyria (river), a river in northwestern Greece
- Tyria, Greece, a village in the municipal unit Selloi, Ioannina regional unit, Greece
- Tyria (planet), fantasy world on which Guild Wars and Guild Wars 2 video games are set
- Tyria (plant), a synonym of the Euphorbiaceae Bernardia
- Tyria (mythology)
