= Zoodochos, Ioannina =

Zoodochos
- Community
- Location within Greece
- Coordinates: 39°41′29″N 20°45′53″E
- Country: Greece
- Administrative region: Epirus
- Regional unit: Ioannina
- Municipality: Zitsa
- Municipal unit: Pasaronas
- Elevation: 626 m (2,054 ft)

Population (2021)
  - Community: 531
- Time zone: UTC+2 (EET)
  - Summer (DST): UTC+3 (EEST)

Zoodochos (Greek: Ζωοδόχος, before 1955: Ζοντίλα, Zontila) is a settlement in Ioannina regional unit, Epirus, Greece. The village is located in the Kourenta area.

== Name ==
The local form of the placename Tzontila is derived from the Albanian word çotill/ë -a, meaning 'stamp, wooden tool used to churn butter'. It stems from the Albanian toçill/ë, -a, 'potter's wheel', which evolved through metathesis from Slavic words for whetstone, rendered as točilo in Bulgarian and točilj in Serbian.

The placename was formed as tšotila, earlier çottila. The tš sound became dž due to the nasal n in the preceding preposition or article in the expression zn tšotila, later zn džudila. Additionally, the t was assimilated into d to match the preceding voiced consonant of dž-t to dž-d, and the unstressed o narrowed into an u sound. The linguist Kostas Oikonomou stated the toponym's Albanian origin is also supported by the formation of the demonyms dždilat -s (masculine), dždilat -sa (feminine), which use the Albanian suffix -at(i) to form family and ethnic names.

== History ==
Some inhabitants of Tzontila (modern Zoodochos) in the Kourenta region fled the village and resettled in the Zagori region, where they established the village of Tzontila (modern Dikoryfo). The village in Kourenta is known as Paliotz'dila (Old Tzontila) by the inhabitants of Dikoryfo.

== See also ==
- List of settlements in the Ioannina regional unit
