= Seniko =

Seniko Σενίκο
- Community
- Location within Greece
- Coordinates: 39°34′N 20°38′E
- Country: Greece
- Administrative region: Epirus
- Regional unit: Ioannina
- Municipality: Dodoni
- Municipal unit: Selloi

Population (2021)
  - Community: 82
- Time zone: UTC+2 (EET)
  - Summer (DST): UTC+3 (EEST)
- Vehicle registration: ΙΝ

Seniko (Greek: Σενίκο) is a village and a community in the municipal unit of Selloi, Ioannina regional unit, Greece. The community includes the villages Domolessa and Mikrochori. It is built at 450 m above sea level, above the left bank of the river Tyria. It is 2.5 km north of Agios Nikolaos, 6 km south of Chinka, 13 km west of Dodoni and 23 km southwest of Ioannina.

== Population ==
Year	Population village	Population community
1981	-	298
1991	117	-
2001	130	212
2011	77	131
2021	49	82

== See also ==
- List of settlements in the Ioannina regional unit
