= Petsali, Ioannina =

Petsali
- Settlement
- Location within Greece
- Coordinates: 39°47′15″N 20°43′2″E
- Country: Greece
- Administrative region: Epirus
- Regional unit: Ioannina
- Municipality: Zitsa
- Municipal unit: Molossoi
- Community: Kourenta
- Elevation: 508 m (1,667 ft)

Population (2021)
  - Total: 20
- Time zone: UTC+2 (EET)
  - Summer (DST): UTC+3 (EEST)

Petsali (Greek: Πετσάλη) is a settlement in Ioannina regional unit, Epirus, Greece. It is part of the community of Kourenta.

== Name ==
The toponym Petsali developed from the surname Petsalis into both neuter and feminine forms. This grammatical shift occurred either by analogy to common nouns for land types or through conversational confusion with masculine prepositional phrases. The surname Petsalis is derived from the old Slavic word pečalь meaning 'sorrow, grief, anxiety'.

== History ==
In 1698, some inhabitants from Petsali, along with others from several villages migrated to the village of Boultsi (modern Elati) in the Zagori region. In Elati, the surname Petsalis is present among modern-day villagers.

== See also ==
- List of settlements in the Ioannina regional unit
