= Elati, Ioannina =

Elati
- Community

- Location within Greece
- Coordinates: 39°49′37″N 20°44′49″E
- Country: Greece
- Administrative region: Epirus
- Regional unit: Ioannina
- Municipality: Zagori
- Municipal unit: Central Zagori
- Elevation: 1,053 m (3,455 ft)

Population (2021)
  - Community: 57
- Time zone: UTC+2 (EET)
  - Summer (DST): UTC+3 (EEST)

Elati (Greek: Ελάτη, before 1926: Μπούλτσι, Mpoultsi, between 1926 and 1928: Έλατα, Elata) is a settlement in Ioannina regional unit, Epirus, Greece.

== Name ==
The toponym stems from a surname Boultsis and the andronym Boultso. The placename is derived from the Albanian term bulçi, definite form: bulçia, in reference to food consumption by the mouth such as 'the soft part of the cheek from the cheekbones down to the jaw' or 'one who takes large mouthfuls of food'. From this same root, the Aromanian term buldzinedzŭ means 'to swell, inflate' and bulčicos 'full, filled'. The demonym Boultsat-s is formed with the suffix atis. In this instance, it is derived from the Albanian suffix ati used in demonyms, as the Greek suffix atis with the ancient proclitic -a lost its productive capacity in Modern Greek and is rendered as -iatis when used in demonyms derived from toponyms containing the phoneme -i.

== History ==
In the 17th century, several cattle-breeding families from the village of Gravisio in the Kourenta region moved to Boultsi and three other locations. In the 19th century, their original settlement in Kourenta was still known as Boultsatika Kalyvia (huts of Boultsi), and ruins of abandoned huts remained visible. Their numbers grew as inhabitants from various villages, particularly Petsali, arrived and eventually formed the village of Boultsi in 1698. During this period, Albanian Muslim converts tried to spread Islam to the villages of Kourenta. The surname Petsalis is present among modern-day villagers.

== Demographics ==
The village is inhabited by Greeks.

== See also ==
- List of settlements in the Ioannina regional unit
