= Ekali (disambiguation) =

Ekali (Greek: Εκάλη) may refer to the following places in Greece:

- Ekali, a suburb of Athens
- Ekali, Ioannina, a municipal unit in Ioannina regional unit
- Ekali, Kavala, a village in Kavala regional unit

Ekali may also refer to:

- Ekali (DJ), Canadian electronic music DJ and producer
