= Voutsaras =

Voutsaras may refer to the following villages in Greece:

- Voutsaras, Arcadia, in the municipal unit Falaisia, Arcadia
- Voutsaras, Ioannina, in the municipal unit Molossoi, Ioannina regional unit
