= Kastri, Evrymenes =

Village in Greece

Coordinates: 39.757°N 20.574°E

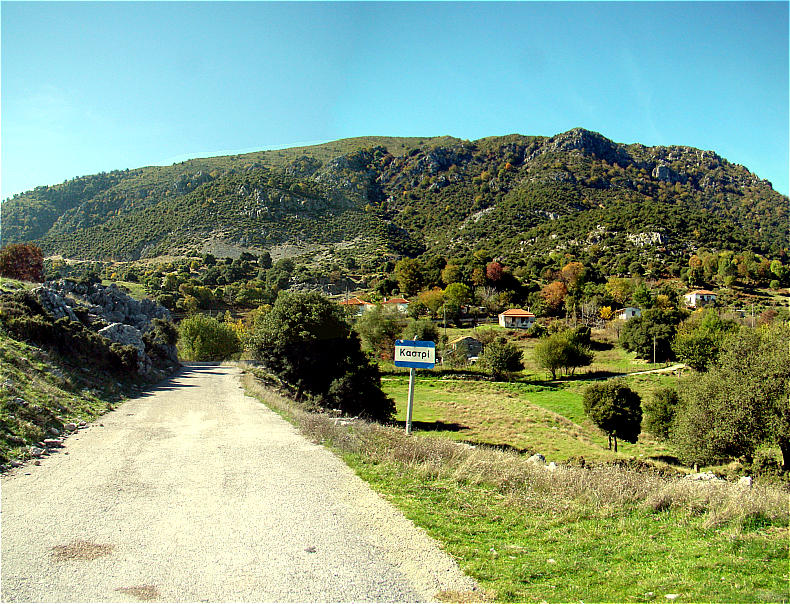
View of the village entrance. The crest of Mount Kassidiaris is also visible.

Kastri (Greek: Καστρί, pron. Kastrí, from the Medieval Greek word for small castle or watchtower) is a village of the unit of Evrymenes, Zitsa municipality, Epirus, NW Greece. Until 1950 it was named Siutista (Greek: Σιούτιστα), a name still in use by the local people.

== Location - Demographics ==
Kastri lies 43 km northwest of Ioannina through a local road connected to the E92/E90 route (Ioannina - Igoumenitsa). Built at an elevation of 800 metres, it is the highest village of Mount Kassidiaris.

According to the 2011 census the permanent inhabitants are 40 persons yet the actual number differs from the statistics. The number of the all-year-round inhabitants does not exceed that of 20, whatsoever. Nevertheless, this number rises after Eastertide, when some retired former villagers travel from their residence in Athens or Ioannina to their village to spend the summer period. This results in a significant increase in the number of Kastri's residents, often exceeding 100 during the August summer vacation period.

== History ==
Kastri was founded by Souliotes fugitives as Siutista in the early 19th century; probably named after the adjacent mountain Kassidiaris, called Siutista at the time. The exact year is unknown, but it must have been soon after Ali Pasha conquered Souli (1803). The British topographer William Martin Leake mentions the village as Shútista in the 4th volume of Travels in Northern Greece, published in 1835, but saves no further information about it.

Monument of that first period is the monastery consecrated to the Dormition of the Theotokos, situated at the northern edge of the village; today only the temple of the monastery survives. In the past it had also been asylum for people suffering from mental disorders.

Typically the villagers of Kastri have always been stock-breeders. They also used to cultivate small amounts of corn, onion and vegetables for domestic use, since the mountainous soil was infertile for large scale farming. After the Second Balkan War and the annexation of Epirus in the Greek State (Treaty of Bucharest, 1913) the families were offered small arable properties in the nearby valley of Upper Thyamis, which previously belonged to Ottoman institutions (chifliks).

The civil war of 1946-1949 triggered the first wave of immigration, when members of the defeated Democratic Army fled to the Eastern Bloc. This was followed by a second long-lasting wave in the following decades, during which most of the villagers immigrated to Athens or West Germany.

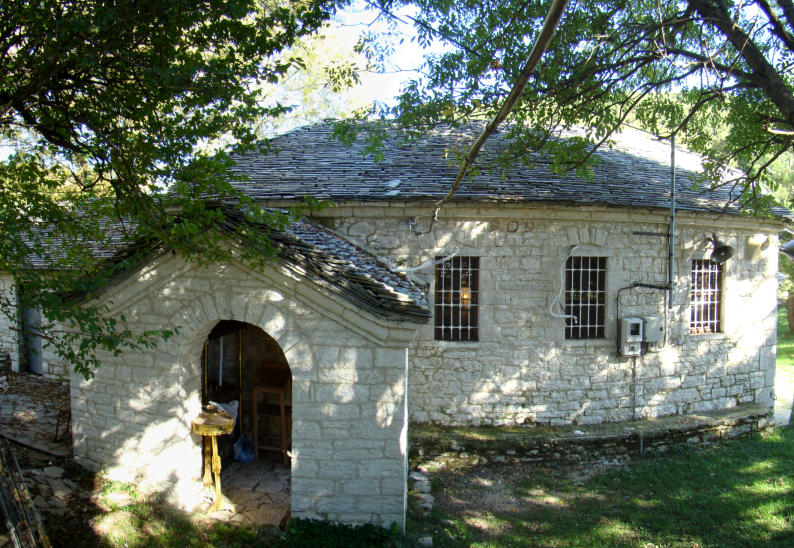
The Temple of Dormition. A rather shy church today, it served as Katholikon for a monastery before the latter's collapse by a wildfire in 1944.

The EEC subventions in the 80's provided some financial support for the few remaining inhabitants to keep on living in the village. At the same period, the connection with the rural road and electricity network encouraged some emigrant families to build houses in their fatherland for use in the summer months.

== Sightseeing ==
The winding asphalt roadway driving to Kastri has an "amazing view above the valley of Upper Thyamis as far Tymfi [...] such that otherwise only alpinists can enjoy". Moreover, a footpath starting from the village leads to the highest peak of Kassidiaris (1329 m).

The only sightseeing inside the village is the Temple of Dormition. Around the temple is held each year the traditional festival of the village (14–16 August) organised by the St. George Brotherhood, the fellowship of those born in or descended from Kastri. Another local celebration is the feast of St. George, who is considered as the village's patron saint.
