= Hipócrita =

Hipócrita may refer to:

- Hipocrita, moth
- Hipócrita (film), 1949 Mexican film
- Los Hipócritas, 1965 Argentine film
- Hipócrita, a 1985 album by Lorenzo de Monteclaro
- "Hipócrita", a 2018 song by Anuel AA featuring Zion
