= Theogefyro =

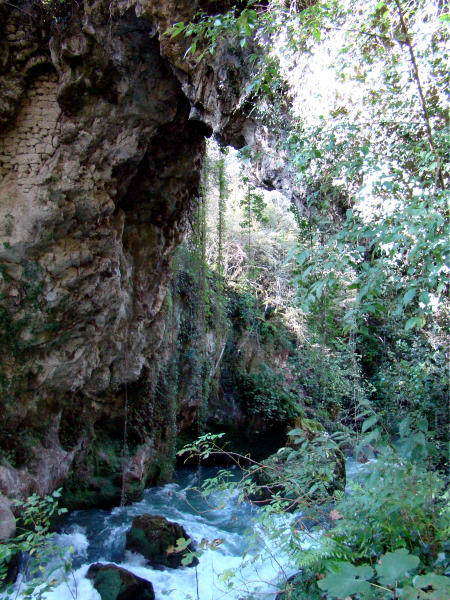
Theogefyro

Theogefyro was a natural arc bridge over the Thyamis River in Epirus, Greece. It was located inside the Zitsa municipality, in Ioannina prefecture. It was a natural monument and one of the most famous landmarks of Epirus. The natural bridge collapsed on 8 February 2018, due to intense rainfall.

== The bridge ==
The bridge was located over the Thyamis river or Kalamas. It was a creation of the nature, since the waters of the Thyamis dug the inferior rocks, leaving intact the superior rocks and creating the natural arc bridge. The bridge was 3 meters width and 4 meters height. For many years, it helped the road communications of this area. The late years, the area had been declared as archaeological site and natural monument. The bridge collapsed on 8 February 2018 due to the intense rainfall.
