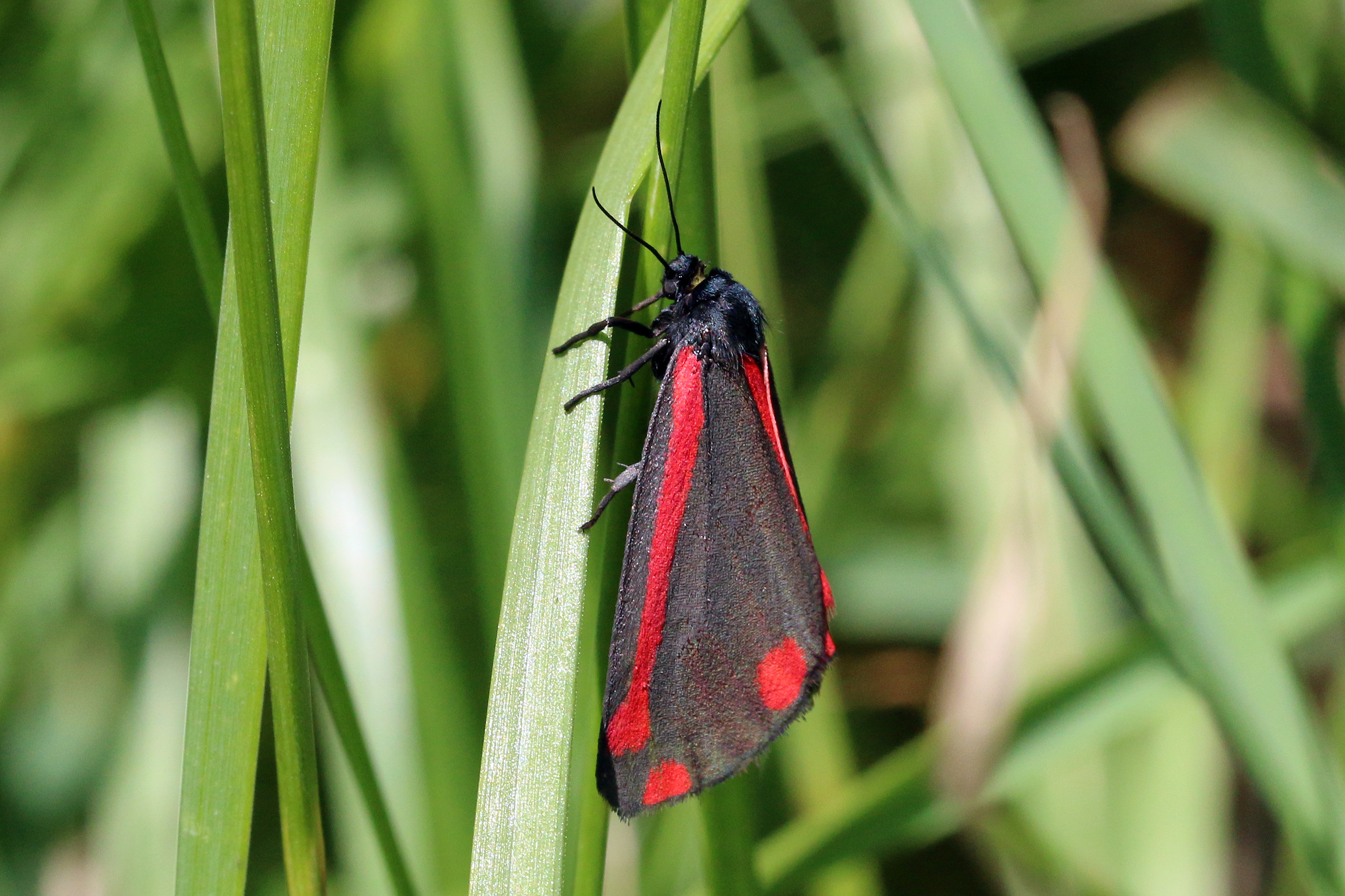

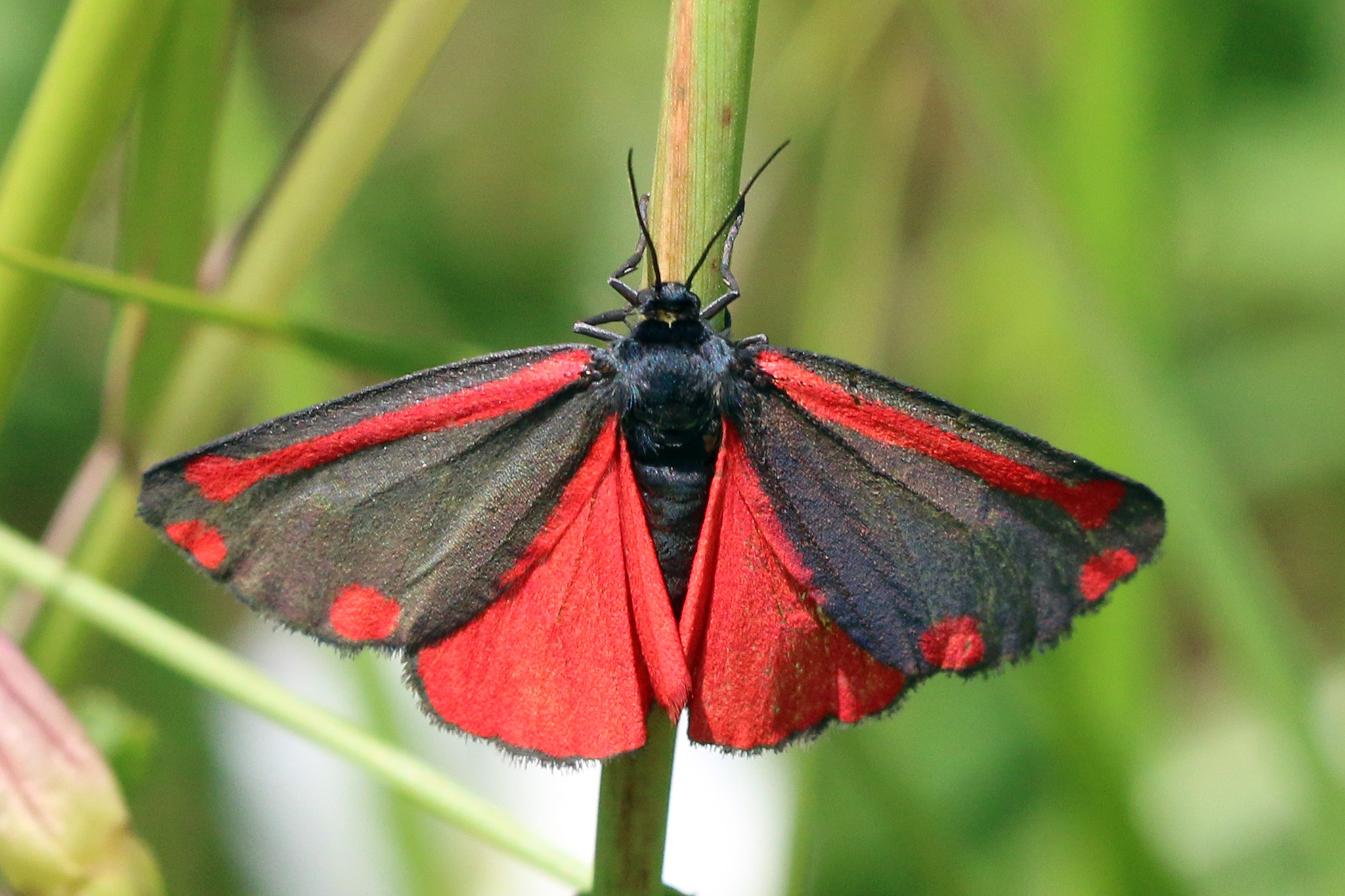
- Moths at Piddington Wood, Oxfordshire, England

Scientific classification
- Kingdom: Animalia
- Phylum: Arthropoda
- Clade: Pancrustacea
- Class: Insecta
- Order: Lepidoptera
- Superfamily: Noctuoidea
- Family: Erebidae
- Subfamily: Arctiinae
- Genus: Tyria
- Species: T. jacobaeae

Binomial name
- Tyria jacobaeae (Linnaeus, 1758)

Synonyms
- Phalaena jacobaeae Linnaeus, 1758; Noctua jacobaeae Linnaeus, 1758; Hippocrita jacobaeae f. confluens Schultz, 1908; Callimorpha senecionis Godart, 1822; Euchelia jacobaea ab. flavescens Thierry-Mieg, 1889

= Cinnabar moth =

Species of moth

The cinnabar moth (Tyria jacobaeae) is a brightly coloured Arctiinae moth found as a native species in Europe and western and central Asia then east across the Palearctic to Siberia to China. It has been introduced into New Zealand, Australia and North America to control ragwort, on which its larvae feed, as a result of this diet the Cinnabar larvae and adult is poisonous to most of its natural predators, its red coloration acting to signal this to predators (Aposematism).

== Description ==
The moth is named after the red mineral cinnabar because of the red patches on its predominantly black wings. The species was first described by Carl Linnaeus in his 1758 10th edition of Systema Naturae. Cinnabar moths are about 20 mm (0.79 in) long and have a wingspan of 34–46 mm (1.3–1.8 in).

While generally nocturnal, the species is also often spotted in daylight hours.

Cinnabar moths are day-flying insects with distinctive pinkish-red and black wings. There is little variation in patterning, although on rare occasions the red markings may be replaced with yellow, or the forewing is entirely red with a black border, or the wings are completely black. Like many other brightly coloured moths, it is unpalatable; the larvae use members of the genus Senecio as food plants. Many members of the genus have been recorded as food plants, but of New World Senecio and Packera species, long-term population success has only been confirmed on the North American native plant Senecio triangularis. Other plant species, such as groundsel, are sometimes used, but larval and population survival tends to be reduced. Newly hatched larvae feed from the underneath of ragwort leaves within the area of their old eggs. The larvae absorb toxic and bitter tasting alkaloid substances from the food plants, and assimilate them, becoming unpalatable themselves. The bright colours of both the larvae and the moths act as warning signs, so they are seldom eaten by predators. An exception is among different species of cuckoo which eat hairy and poisonous caterpillars including cinnabar moth larvae.

== Life cycle ==
Females can lay up to 300 eggs, usually in batches of 30 to 60 on the underside of ragwort leaves. When the caterpillars (larvae) hatch they feed on and around the area of the hatched eggs but as they get bigger and moult (instars) they mainly feed on the leaves and flowers of the plant, and can be seen out in the open during the day.

Like several other Arctiinae larvae, cinnabar caterpillars can turn cannibalistic. This is mainly due to lack of food, but they can eat other cinnabar larvae. Initially, the larvae are pale yellow, but later larval stages develop a jet-black and orange/yellow striped colouring. They can grow up to 30 mm (1.2 in), and are voracious eaters; large populations can strip entire patches of ragwort clean, a result of their low predation.

Often, very few survive to the pupal stage, mainly due to them completely consuming the food source before reaching maturity; this could be a possible explanation for their tendency to engage in seemingly random cannibalistic behaviour, as many will die from starvation. Additionally, the larvae are preyed upon by species like the ants Formica polyctena. They overwinter as cocoons on the ground.

There is evidence that the species is predated by the Brown long-eared bat.

== Relationship with humans ==
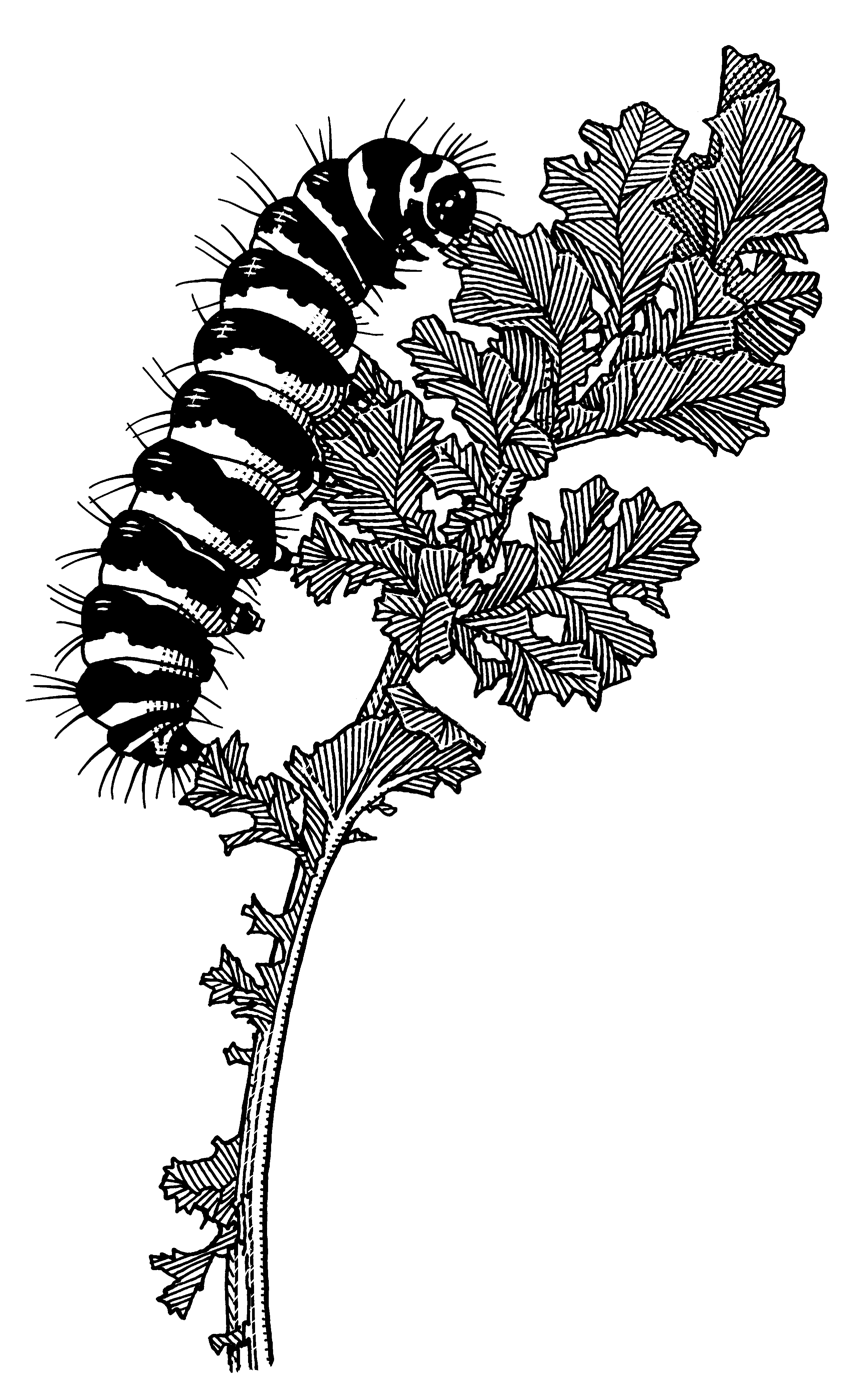

The moth has proven to be particularly successful as a biocontrol agent for ragwort when used in conjunction with the Tansy ragwort flea beetle in the western United States.

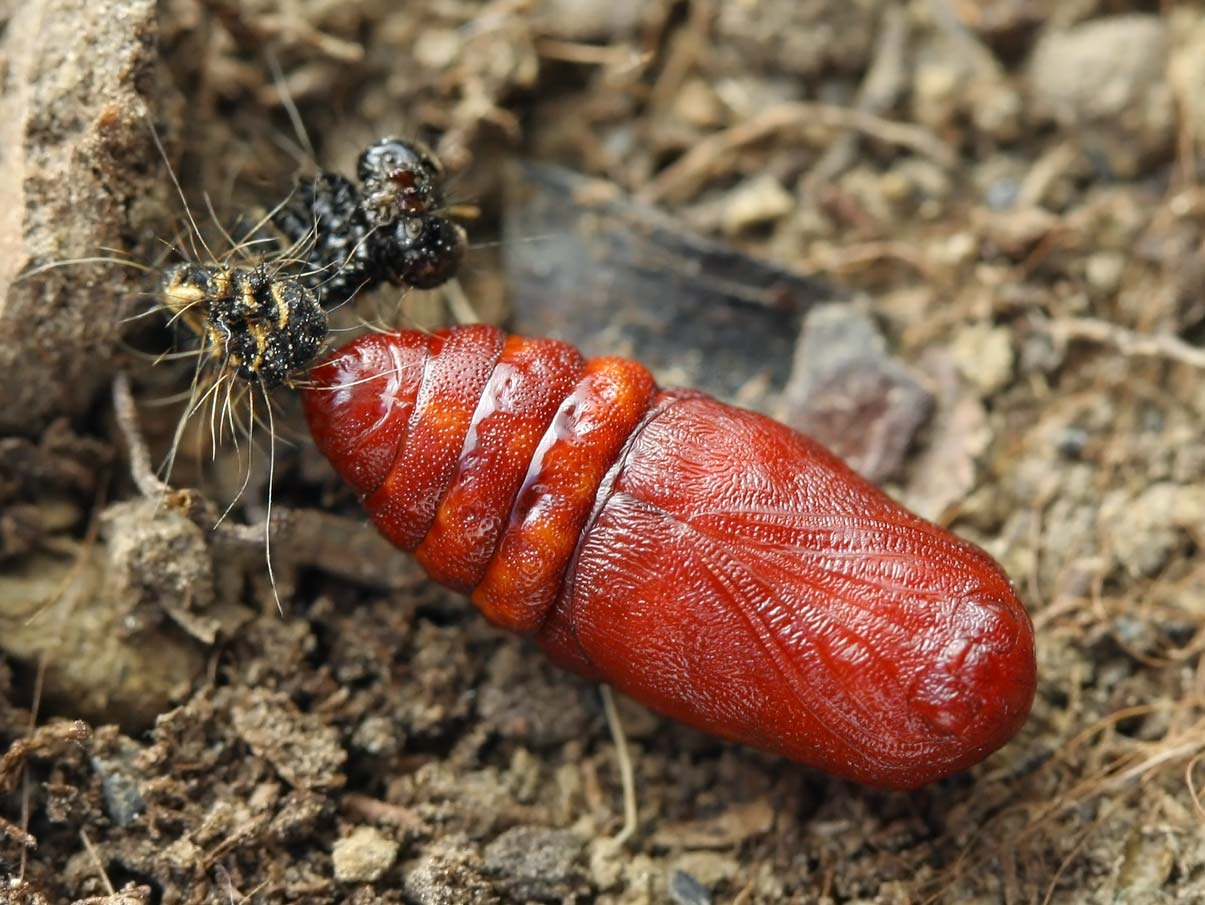
Pupa

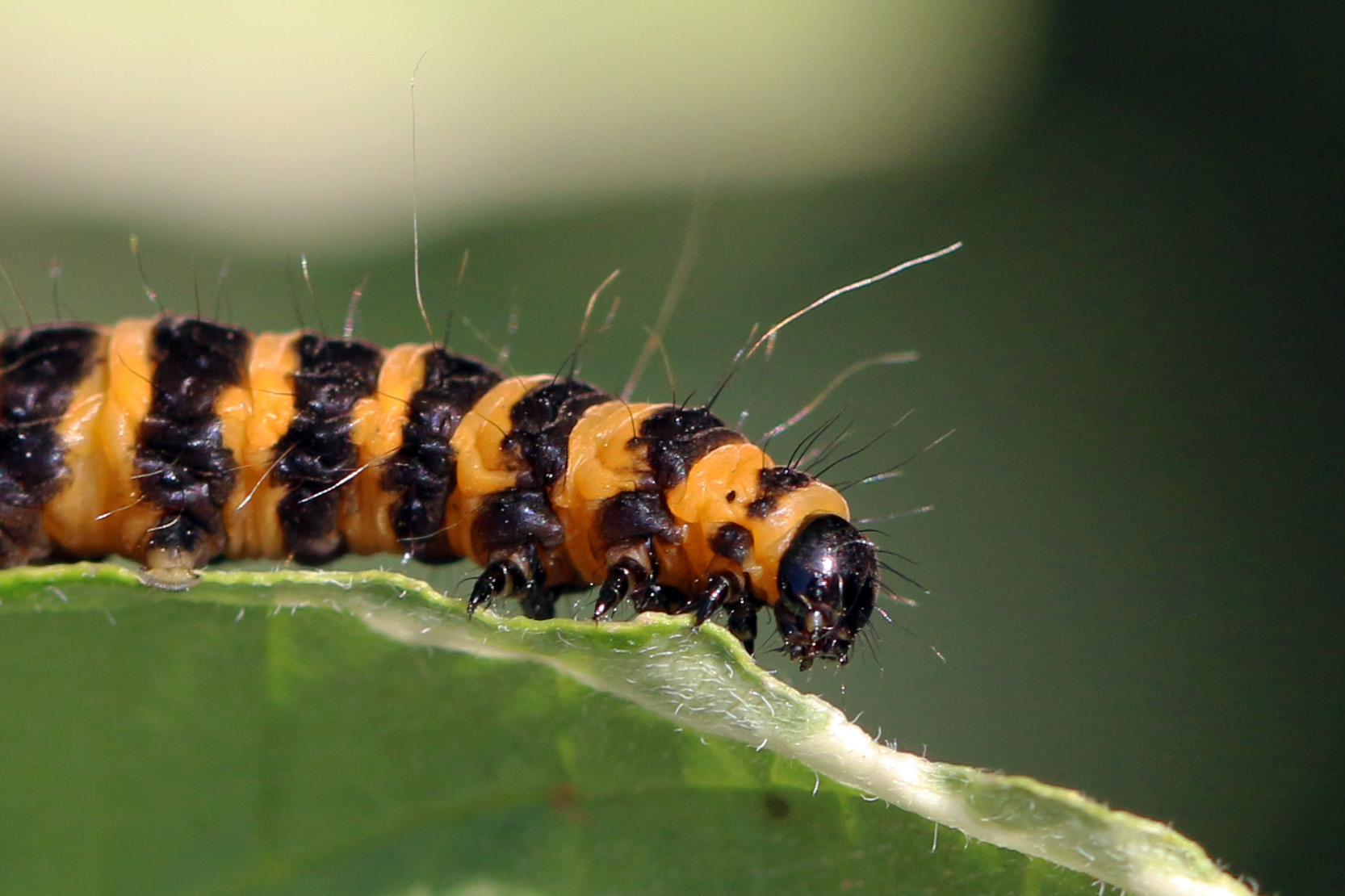
Caterpillar

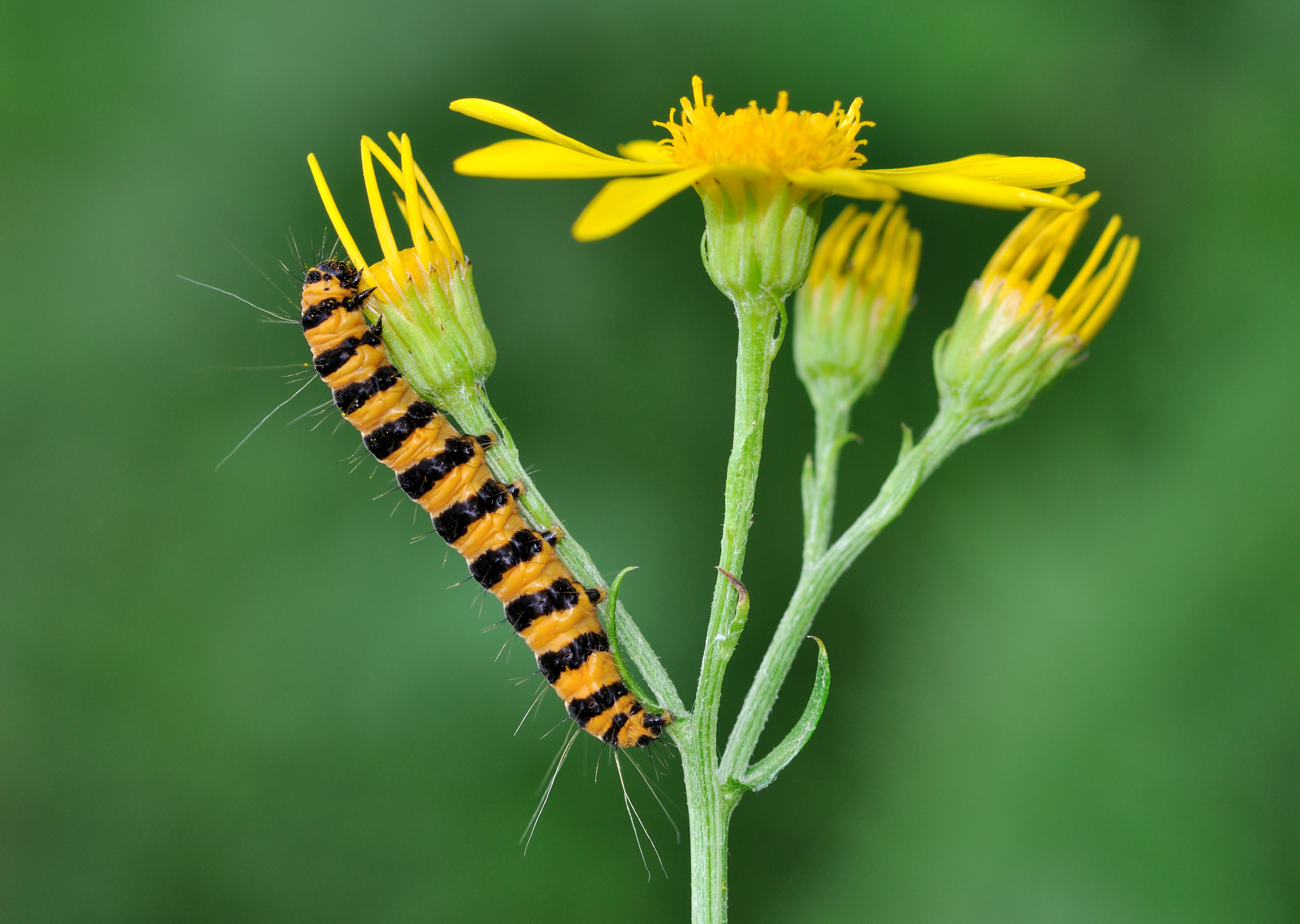
Caterpillar on Ragwort plant

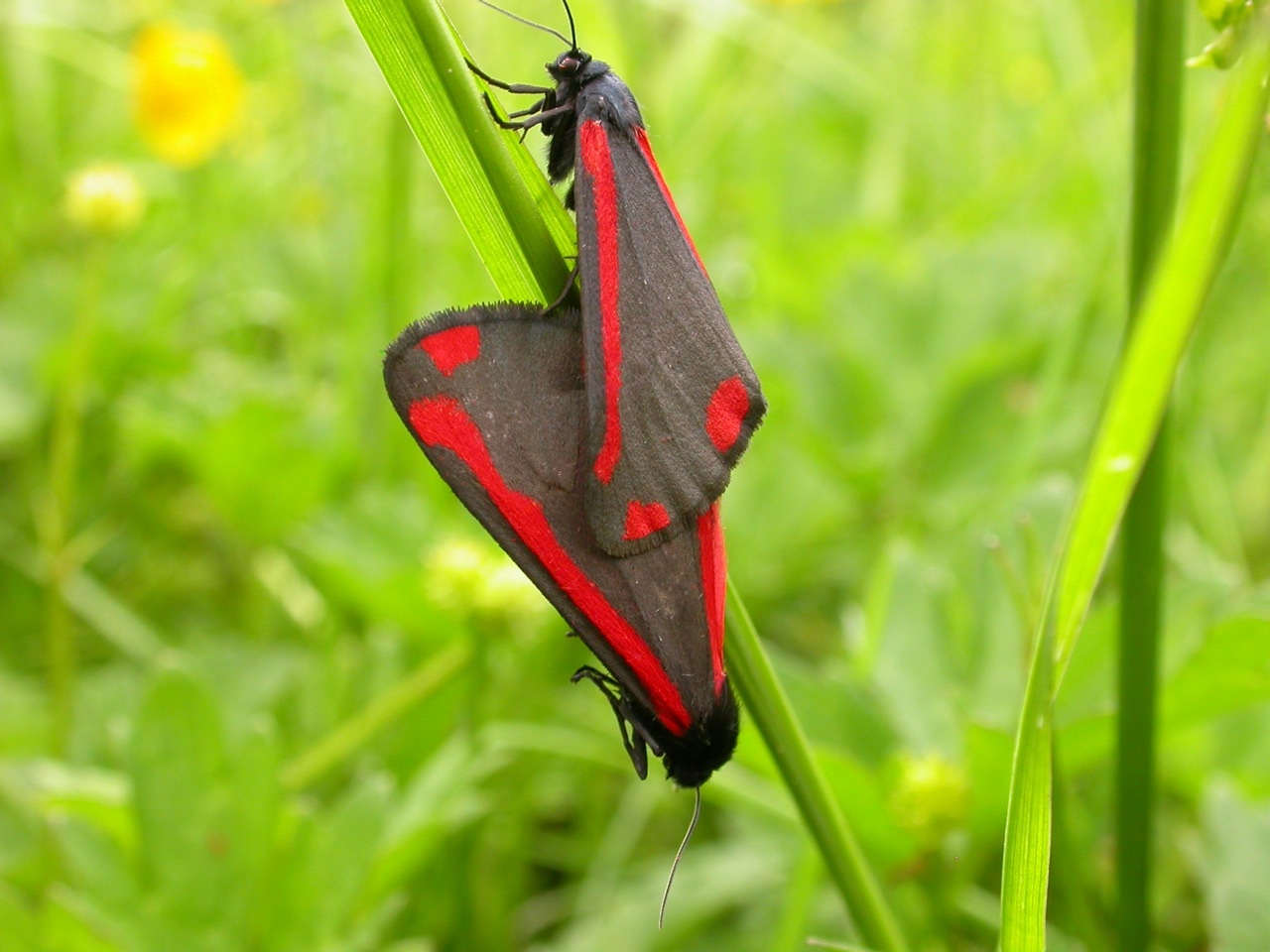
Mating

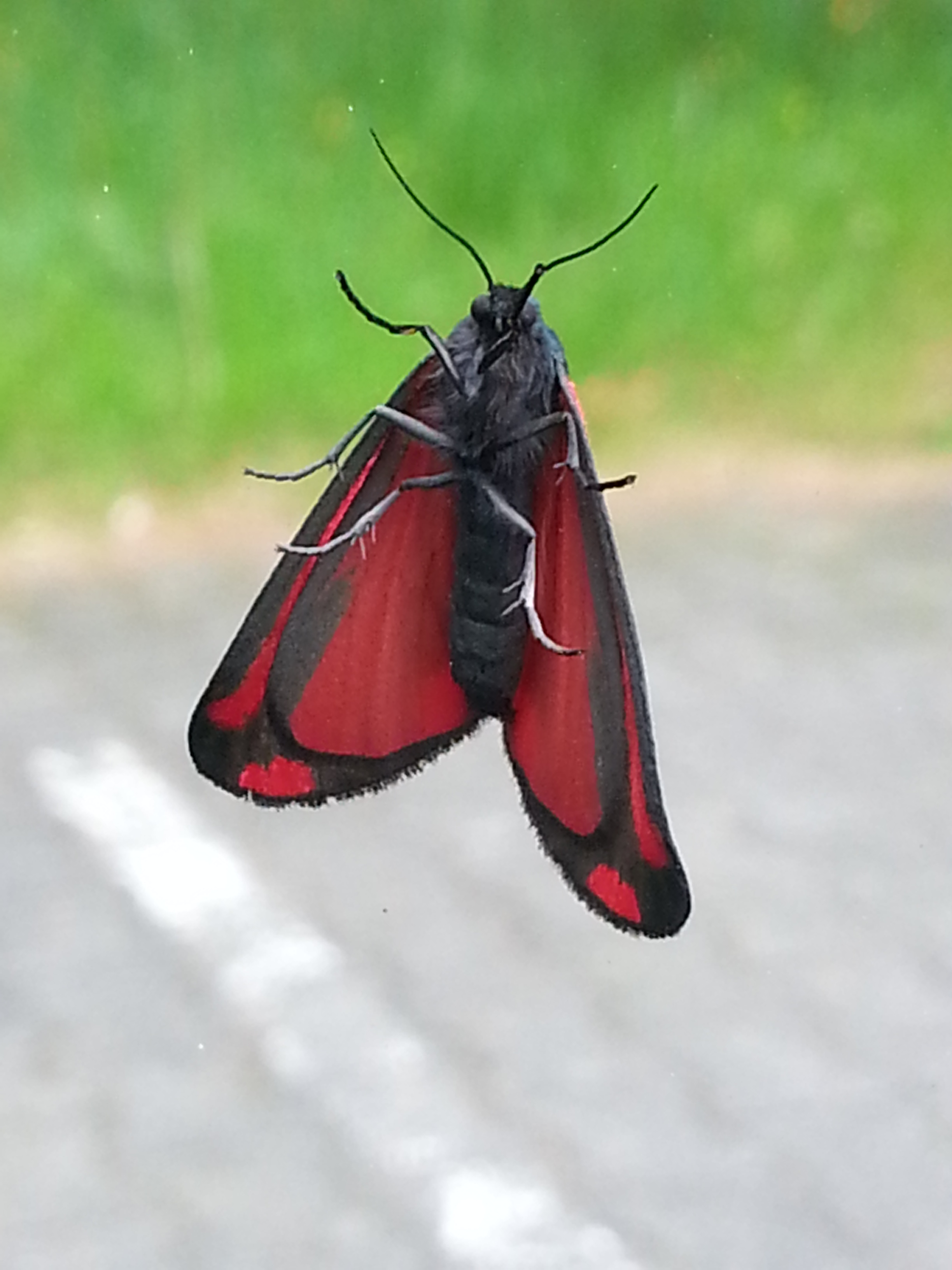
Underneath

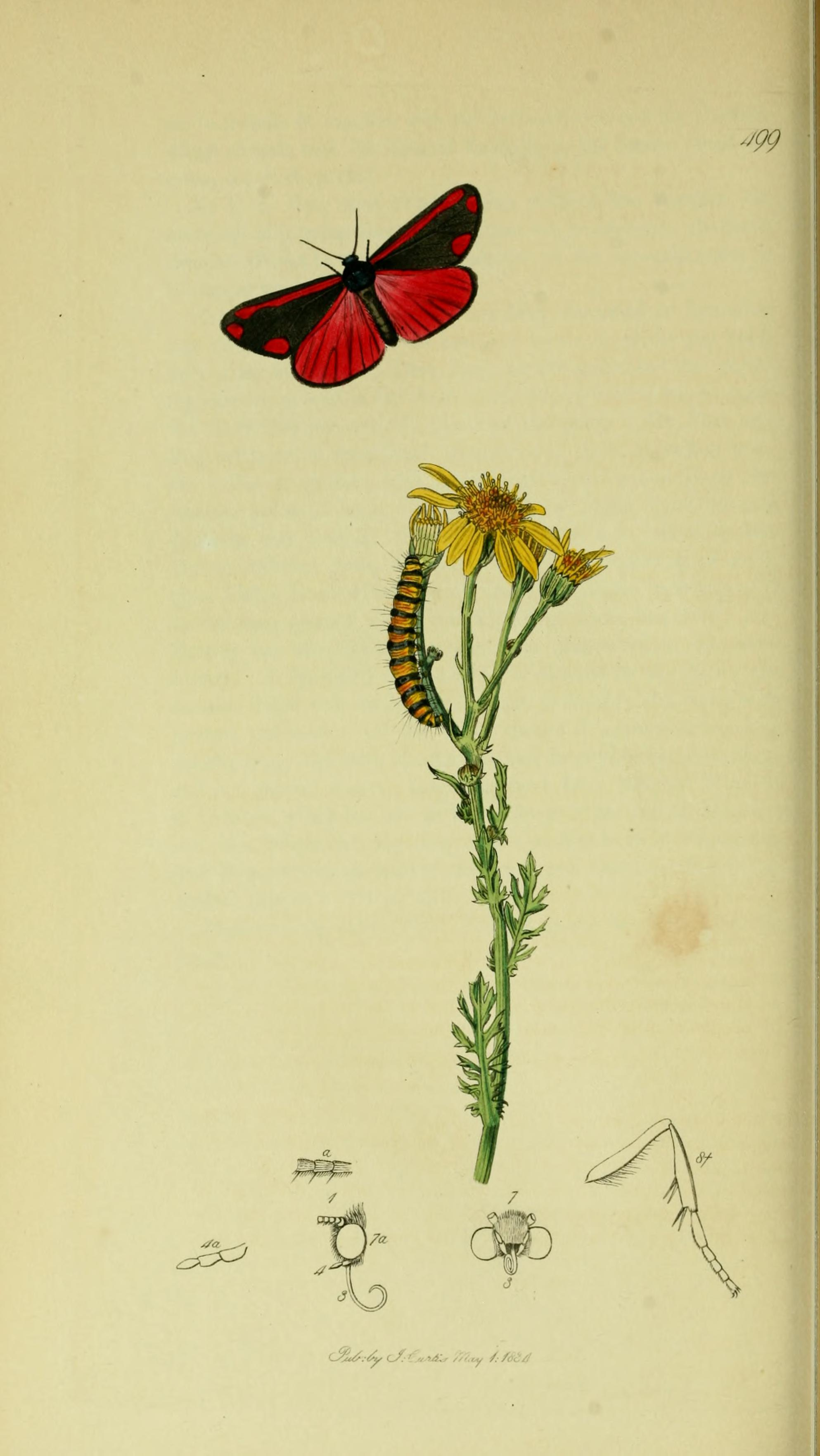
Illustration from John Curtis's British Entomology Volume 5

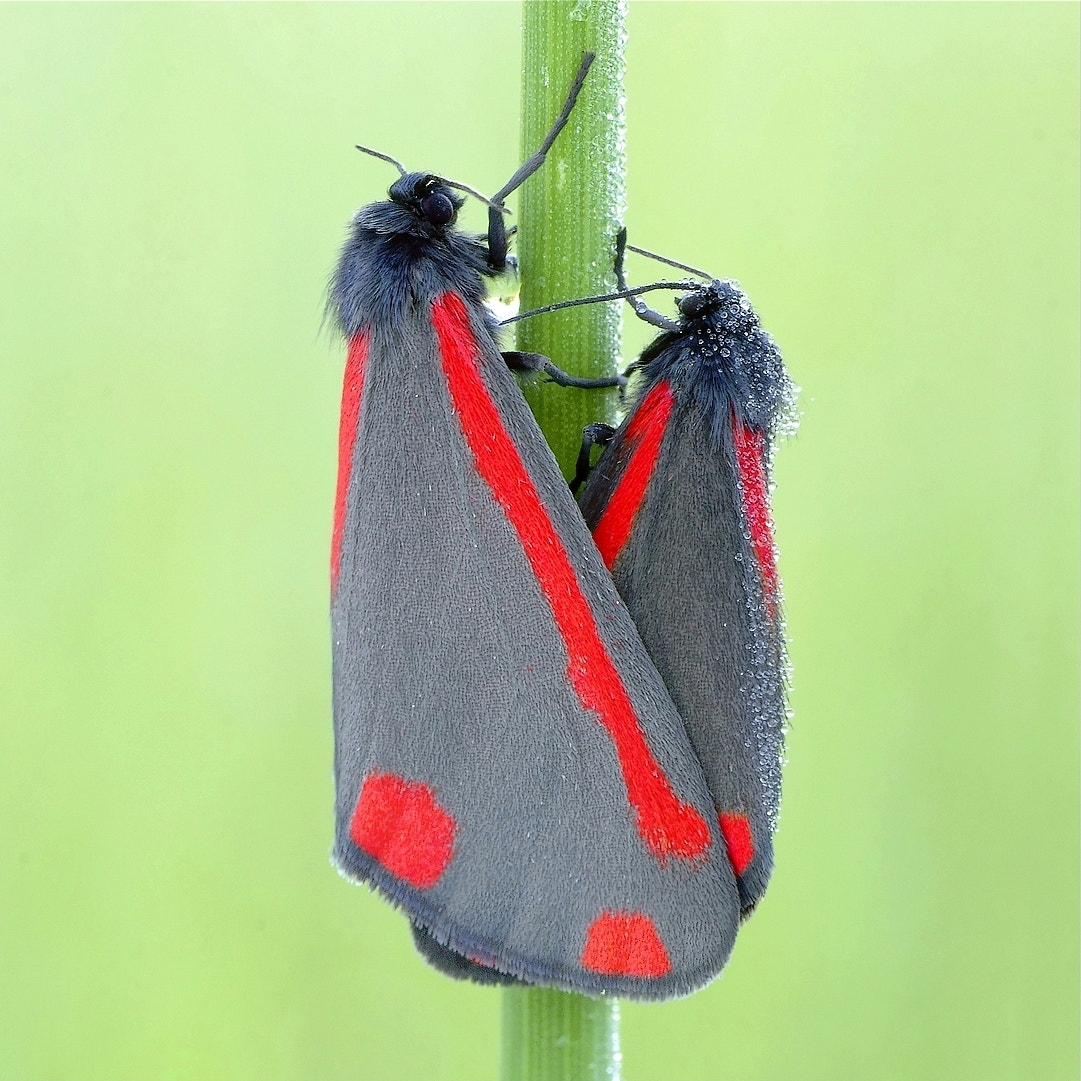
Waiting for the morning sun

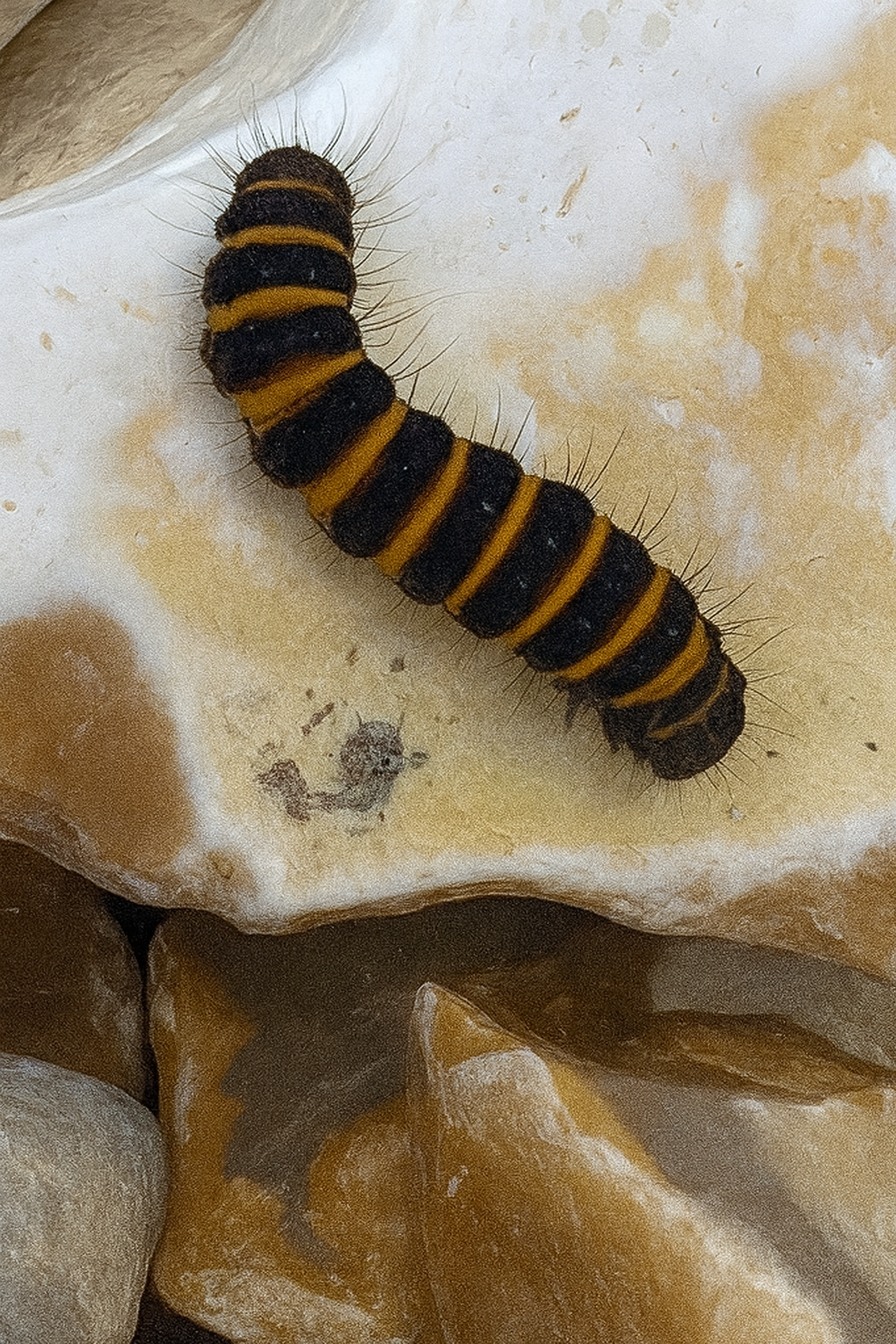
Caterpillar on stones

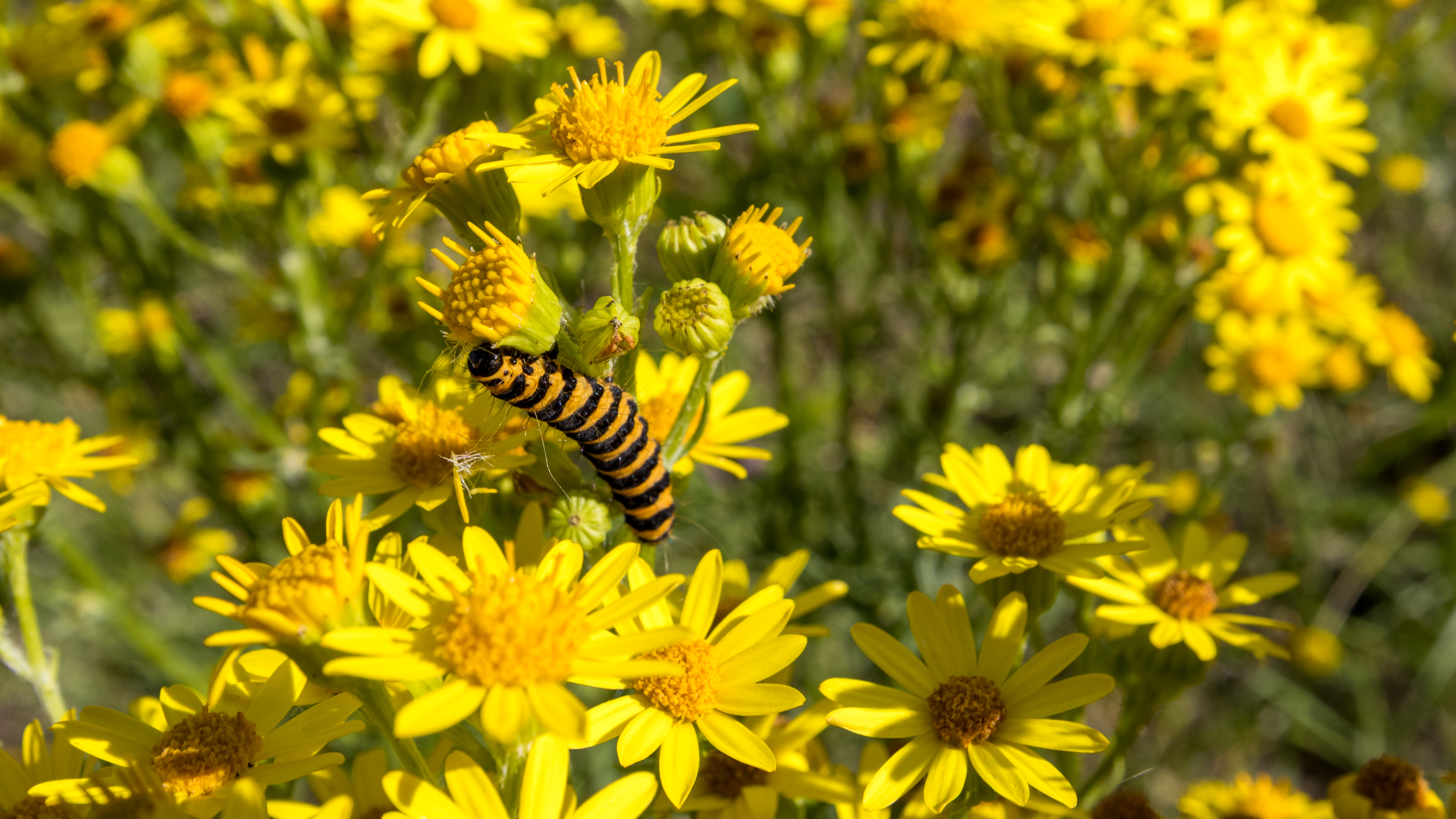
Caterpillar on Ragwort
