= Granitsa, Ioannina =

Granitsa Γρανίτσα
- Community
- Location within Greece
- Coordinates: 39°37′N 20°35′E
- Country: Greece
- Administrative region: Epirus
- Regional unit: Ioannina
- Municipality: Zitsa
- Municipal unit: Molossoi

Population (2021)
  - Community: 88
- Time zone: UTC+2 (EET)
  - Summer (DST): UTC+3 (EEST)
- Vehicle registration: ΙΝ

Granitsa (Greek: Γρανίτσα from the Slavic word for "border") is a village in the municipal unit of Molossoi, Ioannina regional unit, Greece. It is situated on a hillside on the left bank of the river Tyria. It is 4 km southeast of Polydoro, 4 km west of Chinka and 24 km west of Ioannina.

== Population ==
Historical population
Year	Pop.	±%
1981	298	—
1991	232	−22.1%
2001	107	−53.9%
2011	85	−20.6%
2021	88	+3.5%

== See also ==
- List of settlements in the Ioannina regional unit
