= Eleousa, Ioannina =

Eleousa Ελεούσα
- Community
- Location within Greece
- Coordinates: 39°42.4′N 20°47.6′E
- Country: Greece
- Administrative region: Epirus
- Regional unit: Ioannina
- Municipality: Zitsa
- Municipal unit: Pasaronas
- Elevation: 500 m (1,600 ft)

Population (2021)
  - Community: 3,536
- Time zone: UTC+2 (EET)
  - Summer (DST): UTC+3 (EEST)
- Postal code: 45500

Eleousa (Greek: Ελεούσα) is a village in the municipal unit of Pasaronas, Ioannina regional unit, Greece. Since the 2010 local government reform, it is the seat of the municipality Zitsa. In 2021, its population was 3,536. It is situated in the valley northwest of Lake Ioannina, 7 km northwest of the city centre of Ioannina.

== See also ==
- List of settlements in the Ioannina regional unit
