= Tyria (river) =

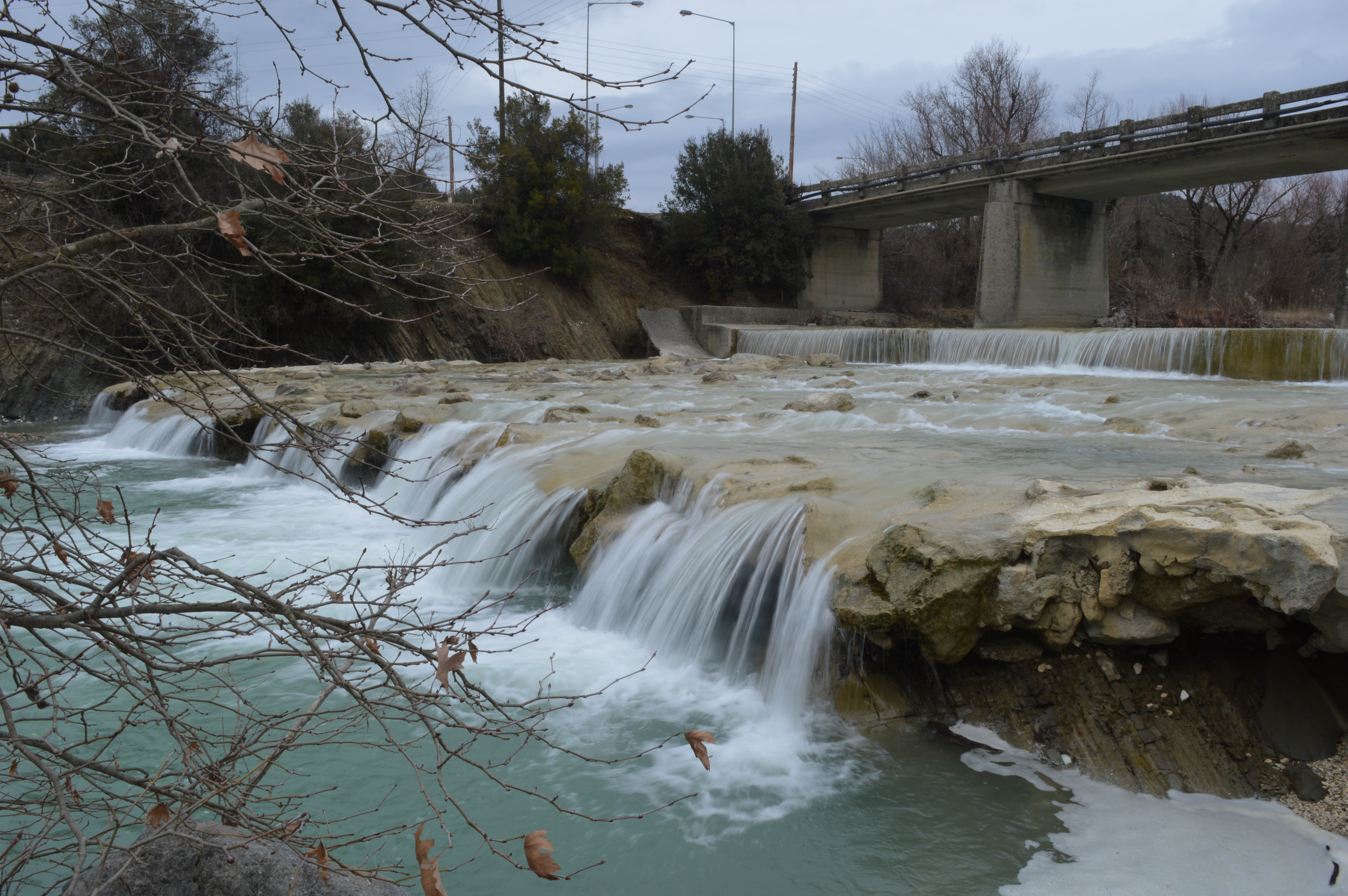
- Native name: Τύρια (Greek)

Location
- Country: Greece

Physical characteristics
- Source
  - location: Ioannina regional unit
- Mouth
  - location: Thyamis
  - coordinates: 39.666°N 20.529°E
  - elevation: about 150 m (490 ft)
- Length: about 35 km (22 mi)

Basin features
- Progression: Thyamis→ Ionian Sea

The Tyria (Greek: Τύρια) is a river in the western part of the Ioannina regional unit in Epirus, Greece. It is a left tributary of the Thyamis. The source of the river Tyria is near the village Platania, on the western slope of the Tomaros mountain. It flows into a generally northwestern direction. It flows into the Thyamis, near Vrosina.

The Tyria flows along the following villages, from source to mouth: Koumaria, Seniko, Chinka, Granitsa, and Polydoro.
