= Polydoro =

Polydoro Πολύδωρο
- Community
- Location within Greece
- Coordinates: 39°38′N 20°34′E
- Country: Greece
- Administrative region: Epirus
- Regional unit: Ioannina
- Municipality: Zitsa
- Municipal unit: Molossoi

Population (2021)
  - Community: 57
- Time zone: UTC+2 (EET)
  - Summer (DST): UTC+3 (EEST)
- Vehicle registration: ΙΝ

Polydoro (Greek: Πολύδωρο, before 1929: Μάζι - Mazi) is a village in the municipal unit of Molossoi, Ioannina regional unit, Greece. It is situated on a hillside on the left bank of the river Tyria. It is 4 km southwest of Voutsaras, 4 km northwest of Granitsa and 25 km west of Ioannina. The village church is dedicated to the Dormition of the Virgin.

== Population ==
Historical population
Year	Pop.	±%
1981	171	—
1991	277	+62.0%
2001	44	−84.1%
2011	63	+43.2%
2021	57	−9.5%

== See also ==
- List of settlements in the Ioannina regional unit
