= Evrymenes, Ioannina =

Evrymenes Ευρυμενές
- Municipal unit
- Location within the regional unit

- Location within Greece
- Coordinates: 39°42′N 20°40′E
- Country: Greece
- Administrative region: Epirus
- Regional unit: Ioannina
- Municipality: Zitsa

Area
  - Municipal unit: 74.0 km^{2} (28.6 sq mi)

Population (2021)
  - Municipal unit: 718
  - Municipal unit density: 9.70/km^{2} (25.1/sq mi)
- Time zone: UTC+2 (EET)
  - Summer (DST): UTC+3 (EEST)
- Vehicle registration: ΙΝ

Evrymenes (Greek: Ευρυμενές) was a short-lived municipality (1996–2010) in the Ioannina Prefecture, Greece. Following the massive mergers that took place in accordance to Kallikratis Plan, since 2011 it holds the status of "municipal unit" (subdivision) within the Municipality of Zitsa. The municipal unit has an area of 73.958 km^{2}. The seat of the entity was in Klimatia. It is situated in the mountainous western part of the Ioannina regional unit.

== Communities ==
Evrymenes is subdivided into 8 communities, consisting of a total number of 11 villages.

- Delvinakopoulo (Delvinakopoulo, Spilaio)
- Klimatia
- Kokkinochoma
- Lefkothea
- Paliouri
- Raiko
- Soulopoulo (Soulopoulo, Mikro Soulopoulo)
- Vasilopoulo (Vasilopoulo, Kastri)

== Population ==
Historical population
Year	Pop.	±%
1991	1,437	—
2001	1,165	−18.9%
2011	1,009	−13.4%
2021	718	−28.8%
