= Voutsaras, Ioannina =

Voutsaras Βουτσαράς
- Community
- Location within Greece
- Coordinates: 39°40′N 20°35′E
- Country: Greece
- Administrative region: Epirus
- Regional unit: Ioannina
- Municipality: Zitsa
- Municipal unit: Molossoi

Population (2021)
  - Community: 105
- Time zone: UTC+2 (EET)
  - Summer (DST): UTC+3 (EEST)
- Vehicle registration: ΙΝ

Voutsaras (Greek: Βουτσαράς, local dialect: Μπτσαρά Btsará) is a village in the municipal unit of Molossoi, Ioannina regional unit, Greece. It was the seat of the former municipality Molossoi. The Greek National Road 6 (Volos - Larissa - Ioannina - Igoumenitsa) runs through Voutsaras. Voutsaras is 4 km northeast of Polydoro, 23 km west of Ioannina and 34 km northeast of Igoumenitsa.

== Population ==
Historical population
Year	Pop.	±%
1981	205	—
1991	160	−22.0%
2001	145	−9.4%
2011	105	−27.6%
2021	105	+0.0%

== Geography and information ==
Much of the area around Voutsaras is mountainous and forested. The forests around the city are populated by a wide range of wildlife, such as bears, wolves, hares, higher primates and deer. The population of wild boar and squirrels has been in decline for a number of years, as a result of extensive hunting. Wildlife conservation groups have been putting pressure on local and regional government to protect the dwindling populations of these species, but these pressures are being resisted, as hunting forms a substantial part of the local diet, along with roots and locally grown food such as kopria. The Thyamis River flows three kilometers to the north. There is a small lake (xhavouza) near the village, through which the river flows. The xhavouza is used as a dumping site for septic tanks from houses in Voutsaras and other cities in the Molossoi municipality, as the untreated water can then be washed away by the river. According to local legend, the xhavouza is the place where water nymphs used to wash their hair, and onlookers were turned to stone.

== Infrastructure ==
An architectural pattern typical for the village consists of a two-floor house: the top floor is fully walled and serves as the residential area for one or more families, whereas the ground floor is used for housing livestock (goats, sheep, pigs). Less wealthy families, who cannot afford a two-floor house share living quarters with the livestock. There are plans to construct centralised plumbing facilities for the disposal of sewage in the near future, so as to replace the current practice of using septic tanks which drain in the nearby river Thyamis.

== Education ==
In an attempt to reverse emigration, the Ministry of Education and Religious Affairs designated Voutsaras as an Area of Educational Priority in 2005. This led to the upgrading of the local primary school and high school, and financial incentives for the teaching staff who are employed there (these bonuses were revoked in the 2010 government deficit crisis). Also, a new vocationally focussed syllabus was created for High School, with standards that were better suited to the academic potential of the Voutsaras youth. The Voutsaras High School also operates a successful adult education programme, in which local residents attend classes on literacy, arithmetic and hygiene. The programme, which is partly funded by the EU, and is also generously supported by the School of Education of the University of the Aegean has received praise from the Molossoi mayor and local press. Despite promising beginnings, the funding of the program was withdrawn in 2011 due to austerity measures associated with the Greek deficit crisis. The deputy minister for education, Evangelia Christofilopoulou, who took the decision to discontinue the program was quoted as saying that it is time for bold measures to stop the bleeding of the government budget.

== Sights ==
One of the most noteworthy sights in the village is the Church of Ai Nikolas (St. Nicolas) which was erected by the alms donated by the sailors of Voutsaras, because in the Greek Orthodox tradition St Nicolas is regarded as the patron saint of sailors. The church, a basilica with three wings, dates back to 1534, and is one of the oldest churches in the region.

Also of interest is the exhibition in the Cultural Centre, where visitors can find on display items of everyday life and agriculture, such as kypria (bells used for livestock), tsanakia (eating utensils), vitses (rods used by teachers) and glitses (walking sticks). Entry to the exhibition can be arranged by consultation with the Town Hall of Molossi.

== See also ==
- List of settlements in the Ioannina regional unit
