= Chinka, Greece =

Chinka Χίνκα
- Community
- Location within Greece
- Coordinates: 39°37′N 20°38′E
- Country: Greece
- Administrative region: Epirus
- Regional unit: Ioannina
- Municipality: Zitsa
- Municipal unit: Molossoi

Population (2021)
  - Community: 130
- Time zone: UTC+2 (EET)
  - Summer (DST): UTC+3 (EEST)
- Vehicle registration: ΙΝ

Chinka (Greek: Χίνκα) is a village in the municipal unit of Molossoi, Ioannina regional unit, Greece. It is situated on a hillside above the right bank of the Tyria River. It is 4 km east of Agios Christoforos, 14 km northwest of Dodoni and 20 km west of Ioannina.

== Population ==
Year	Village population	Community population
1981	264	-
1991	107	-
2001	87	207
2011	37	90
2021	82	130

== See also ==
- List of settlements in the Ioannina regional unit
