= Kourenta =

- Community
- Location within Greece
- Coordinates: 39°39′8″N 20°36′42″E
- Country: Greece
- Administrative region: Epirus
- Regional unit: Ioannina
- Municipality: Zitsa
- Municipal unit: Molossoi
- Elevation: 508 m (1,667 ft)

Population (2021)
  - Community: 140
- Time zone: UTC+2 (EET)
  - Summer (DST): UTC+3 (EEST)

Kourenta (Greek: Κούρεντα) is a settlement in Ioannina regional unit, Epirus, Greece. The community consists of the villages Kourenta and Petsali.

== Name ==
In the 19th century, scholar Ioannis Lambridis stated Kourenta was the name of a župan (chieftain) and rendered Kourentas as a masculine noun that shifted into a neuter plural in an area where Albanian settlement had occurred.

Without excluding a proper name derivation, the linguist Kostas Oikonomou stated the toponym likely stemmed from the Albanian noun kurent -i, plural kurente, meaning 'river current, torrent'. In a metaphorical context, this Albanian word can refer to an impetuous or rushing person, although it also corresponds to the geographical terrain of the area. The village is located on the left side of a ravine, at the bottom of which flows the Korakolakkos river, a tributary of the Kalamas river that becomes a rushing torrent particularly during winter.

== History ==
The name of the village, Kourenta, is also used for the wider region called Kourentachoria (villages of Kourenta). The scholar Ioannis Lambridis wrote that Albanians had settled in Kourenta. The historian Michalis Kokolakis stated the Kourenta area formed an Albanian speech island, and some of the Albanian-speaking population converted to Islam. In the late 17th century, Albanian Muslim converts tried to spread Islam to the villages of Kourenta, while part of the population migrated to Zagori. Later, the local population expelled the Albanian Muslim converts. The remaining Albanian speakers eventually became hellenised through interaction with nearby Greek speakers, resulting in a language shift to Greek.

== See also ==
- List of settlements in the Ioannina regional unit
