= Ekali, Ioannina =

Ekali Εκάλη
- Municipal unit
- Location within the regional unit

- Location within Greece
- Coordinates: 39°49′N 20°39′E
- Country: Greece
- Administrative region: Epirus
- Regional unit: Ioannina
- Municipality: Zitsa

Area
  - Municipal unit: 49.2 km^{2} (19.0 sq mi)

Population (2021)
  - Municipal unit: 1,254
  - Municipal unit density: 25.5/km^{2} (66.0/sq mi)
- Time zone: UTC+2 (EET)
  - Summer (DST): UTC+3 (EEST)
- Vehicle registration: ΙΝ

Ekali (Greek: Εκάλη) is a former municipality in the Ioannina regional unit, Epirus, Greece. Since the 2011 local government reform it has been part of the municipality Zitsa, of which it is a municipal unit. The municipal unit has an area of 49.181 km^{2}. with a population 1,254 (2021). The seat of the municipality was in Metamorfosi.
