= Pasaronas =

Pasaronas Πασαρώνας
- Municipal unit
- Location within the regional unit

- Location within Greece
- Coordinates: 39°42′N 20°48′E
- Country: Greece
- Administrative region: Epirus
- Regional unit: Ioannina
- Municipality: Zitsa

Area
  - Municipal unit: 135.3 km^{2} (52.2 sq mi)

Population (2021)
  - Municipal unit: 9,203
  - Municipal unit density: 68.02/km^{2} (176.2/sq mi)
- Time zone: UTC+2 (EET)
  - Summer (DST): UTC+3 (EEST)
- Vehicle registration: ΙΝ

Pasaronas (Greek: Πασαρώνας) is a former municipality in the Ioannina regional unit, Greece. Since the 2011 local government reform it is part of the municipality Zitsa, of which it is a municipal unit. The municipal unit has an area of 135.278 km^{2}. Population 9,203 (2021). The seat of the municipality was the village Eleousa.

== See also ==
- Passaron
- Molossians
