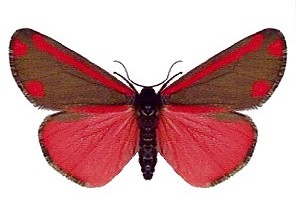
- Tyria jacobaeae

Scientific classification
- Kingdom: Animalia
- Phylum: Arthropoda
- Clade: Pancrustacea
- Class: Insecta
- Order: Lepidoptera
- Superfamily: Noctuoidea
- Family: Erebidae
- Subfamily: Arctiinae
- Subtribe: Callimorphina
- Genus: Tyria; Hübner, 1820

Synonyms
- Hipocrita Hübner, [1806]; Euchelia Boisduval, 1828

= Tyria (moth) =

Genus of moths

Tyria is a genus of tiger moths in the family Erebidae erected by Jacob Hübner in 1820. It includes one species: Tyria jacobaeae.
