= Molossoi =

Molossoi Μολοσσοί
- Municipal unit
- Location within the regional unit

- Location within Greece
- Coordinates: 39°39′N 20°34′E
- Country: Greece
- Administrative region: Epirus
- Regional unit: Ioannina
- Municipality: Zitsa

Area
  - Municipal unit: 241.3 km^{2} (93.2 sq mi)

Population (2021)
  - Municipal unit: 1,460
  - Municipal unit density: 6.05/km^{2} (15.7/sq mi)
- Time zone: UTC+2 (EET)
  - Summer (DST): UTC+3 (EEST)
- Vehicle registration: ΙΝ

Molossoi (Greek: Μολοσσοί) is a former municipality in the Ioannina regional unit, Epirus, Greece. Since the 2011 local government reform it is part of the municipality Zitsa, of which it is a municipal unit. The municipal unit has an area of 241.281 km^{2}. The seat of the municipality was in Voutsaras.

== Subdivisions ==
The municipal unit Molossoi is subdivided into the following communities (constituent villages in brackets):

- Aetopetra (Aetopetra, Kato Aetopetra)
- Chinka (Chinka, Laliza, Zorgiani)
- Despotiko
- Dovla (Dovla, Fteri)
- Ekklisochori
- Foteino (Foteino, Kournorrachi)
- Giourganista (Agios Christoforos)
- Grimpovo (Grimpovo, Seltsana)
- Granitsa
- Granitsopoula
- Kalochori
- Kourenta (Kourenta, Petsali)
- Polydoro
- Radovizi (Radovizi, Dichouni)
- Rizo
- Vereniki (Vereniki, Venterikos, Kato Vereniki, Palaiochora)
- Voutsaras
- Vrosina (Vrosina, Agios Georgios)
- Vrysoula
- Zalongo (Zalongo, Kato Zalongo)

== Population ==
Historical population
Year	Pop.	±%
1991	3,618	—
2001	1,893	−47.7%
2011	1,646	−13.0%
2021	1,460	−11.3%

== See also ==
- List of settlements in the Ioannina regional unit
