= Selloi, Ioannina =

Selloi Σελλοί
- Municipal unit
- Location within the regional unit

- Location within Greece
- Coordinates: 39°31′N 20°41′E
- Country: Greece
- Administrative region: Epirus
- Regional unit: Ioannina
- Municipality: Dodoni

Area
  - Municipal unit: 166.432 km^{2} (64.260 sq mi)

Population (2021)
  - Municipal unit: 1,088
  - Municipal unit density: 6.537/km^{2} (16.93/sq mi)
- Time zone: UTC+2 (EET)
  - Summer (DST): UTC+3 (EEST)
- Vehicle registration: ΙΝ

Selloi (Greek: Σελλοί) is a former municipality in the Ioannina regional unit, Epirus, in northwestern Greece. Since the 2011 local government reform, it is part of the municipality of Dodoni, of which it is a municipal unit. The municipal unit has an area of 166.432 km^{2}. Selloi is in the southwest of the Ioannina regional unit. The municipal unit is subdivided into fifteen communities.

The seat of the municipality was in Tyria, a village of the community of Baousioi next to the river Tyria. From there is passing the Via Egnatia Road (A/K of Selli). The name comes from the ancient Selloi who lived around Dodona.

Tourist sites include the cave of the bears, the Stournari Well and the Batzarion Cheese Factory.
