= Zitsa =

Village in Epirus, Greece

Zitsa Ζίτσα
- Municipality
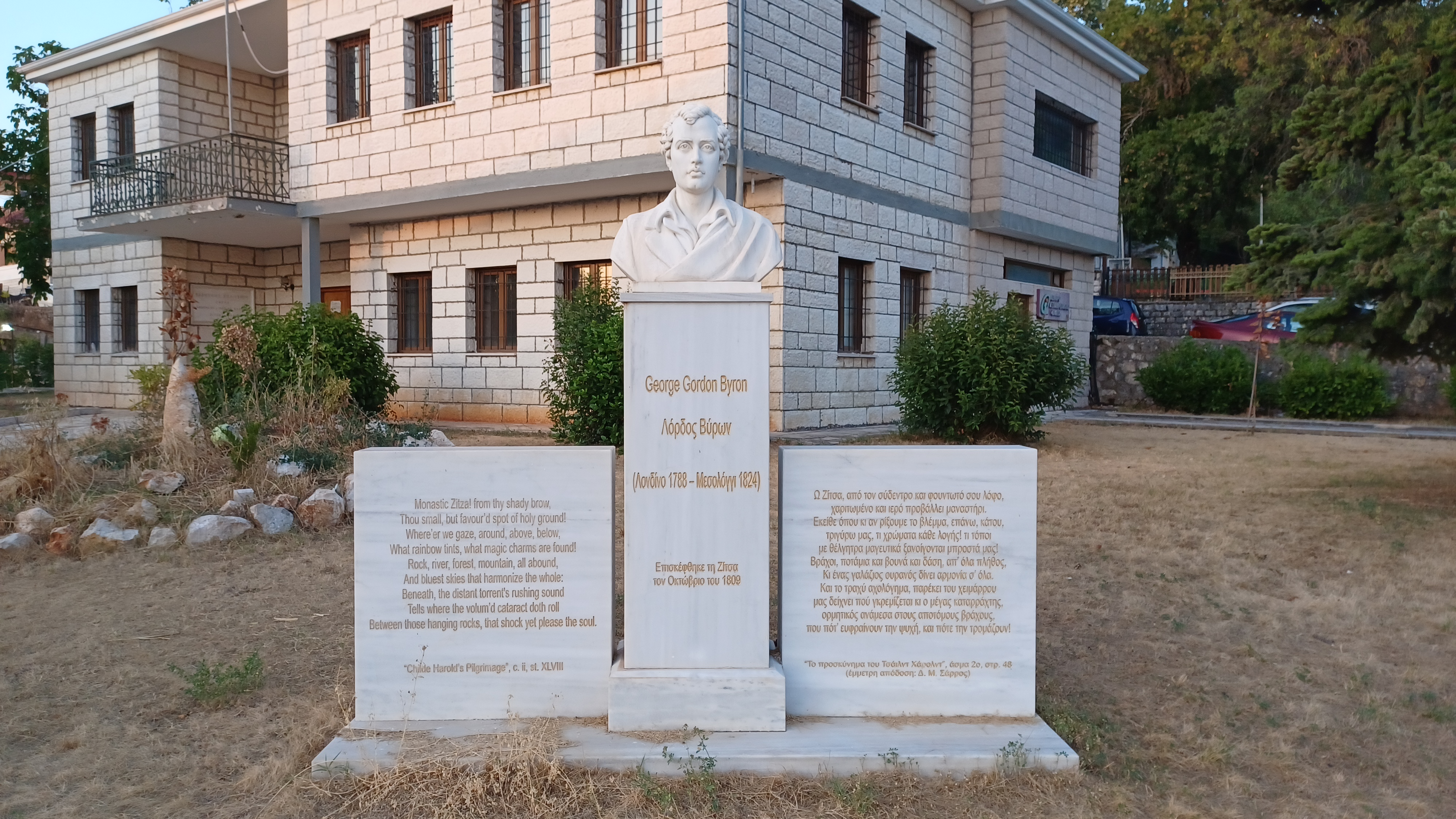
- Monument to Lord Byron in Zitsa

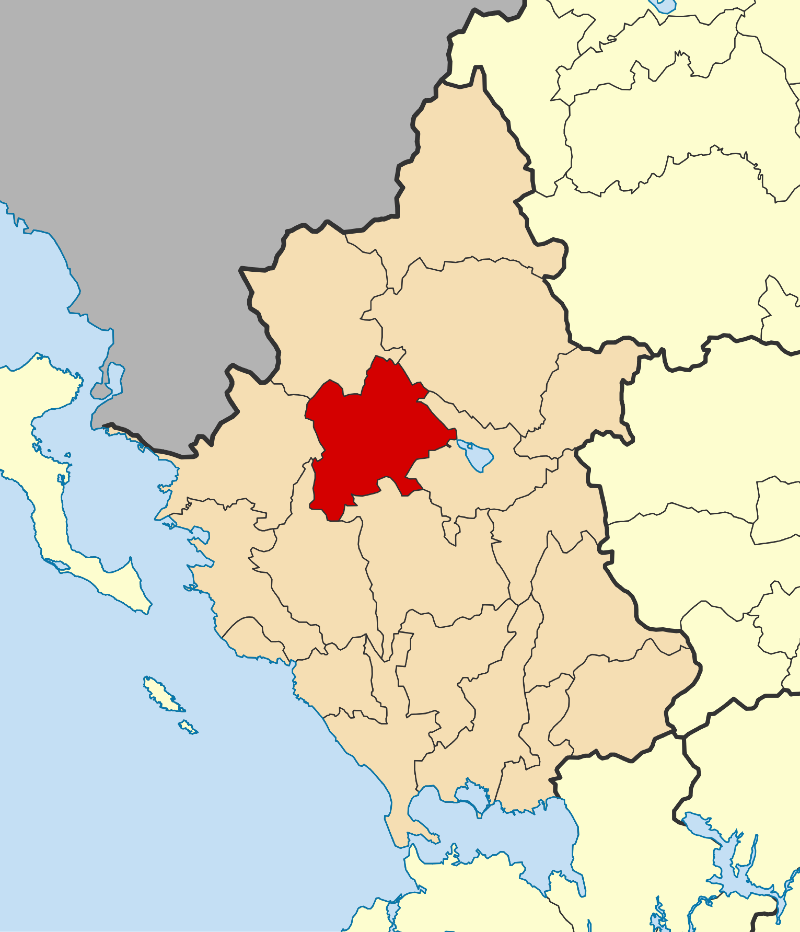

- Location within Greece
- Coordinates: 39°45′N 20°39′E
- Country: Greece
- Administrative region: Epirus
- Regional unit: Ioannina

Area
  - Municipality: 565.6 km^{2} (218.4 sq mi)
  - Municipal unit: 65.87 km^{2} (25.43 sq mi)
  - Community: 29.17 km^{2} (11.26 sq mi)

Population (2021)
  - Municipality: 13,588
  - Density: 24.02/km^{2} (62.22/sq mi)
  - Municipal unit: 953
  - Municipal unit density: 14.5/km^{2} (37.5/sq mi)
  - Community: 492
  - Community density: 16.9/km^{2} (43.7/sq mi)
- Time zone: UTC+2 (EET)
  - Summer (DST): UTC+3 (EEST)
- Vehicle registration: ΙΝ

Zitsa (Greek: Ζίτσα) is a village and a municipality in the Ioannina regional unit, Epirus, Greece. The seat of the municipality is the village Eleousa. The municipality has an area of 565.566 km^{2}, the municipal unit 65.868 km^{2}, the community 29.169 km^{2}.

== History ==
The first reference to Zitsa is in the Chronicle of Ioannina in 1382. It developed into a prosperous village in the Ottoman era and became a centre of wine production, something for which it is still renowned. During this period, it appeared in the travelogues of various Western Europeans, including William Martin Leake (1809), Lord Byron (1809) and Henry Holland (1813). Byron, who spent two nights in Zitsa's monastery, was so enamoured with the village that he later included a stanza about it in his Childe Harold's Pilgrimage.

Zitsa became part of Greece in 1913. It was the site of fierce battles during the Greek Civil War. In the post-War era, the construction of new roads and reorientation of the economy diminished the influence of Zitsa in the wider region. Wine production and tourism remain the two main economic activities.

== Municipality ==
The present municipality Zitsa was formed at the 2011 local government reform by the merger of the following 5 former municipalities, that became municipal units (constituent communities in brackets):

- Ekali (Asfaka, Vatatades, Vlachatano, Gavrisioi, Ligopsa, Metamorfosi, Petsali)
- Evrymenes (Delvinakopoulo, Klimatia, Kokkinochoma, Lefkothea, Paliouri, Raiko, Soulopoulo, Vasilopoulo)
- Molossoi (Aetopetra, Chinka, Despotiko, Dovla, Ekklisochori, Foteino, Giourganista, Granitsa, Granitsopoula, Grimpovo, Kalochori, Kourenta, Polydoro, Radovizi, Rizo, Vereniki, Voutsaras, Vrosina, Vrysoula, Zalongo)
- Pasaronas (Agios Ioannis, Anargyroi, Ano Lapsista, Eleousa, Grammeno, Kato Lapsista, Lofiskos, Lyngos, Mega Gardiki, Neochori, Peratis, Petralona, Polylofo, Rodotopi, Vageniti, Vounoplagia, Zoodochos)
- Zitsa (Dafnofyto, Karitsa, Lithino, Protopappas, Zitsa)

== Notable people ==
- Patriarch Jeremias I of Constantinople (died 1546)

== Landmarks ==
- Theogefyro
